= Ra'il I'Nasah Kiam =

Internet activist

Ra'il I'Nasah Kiam (born I'Nasah Kiam Crockett) is an artist, writer, tech critic, and independent researcher based in North Carolina. As of 2024, they (Note: I'nasah Kiam uses both xe/xim and they/them pronouns. This article uses they/them for consistency.) work primarily as a writer and photographer, in addition to curating black art. In 2014, they were involved in exposing and responding to the online harassment campaign known by the hashtag #EndFathersDay, and were the target of doxxing and threats for their efforts.

== Early life and education ==
I'Nasah Kiam is from Atlanta, Georgia, and "a proud product of the nontraditional education method known as home schooling." They earned a bachelor's degree from Sarah Lawrence College in 2008, and a master's degree in Southern studies from the University of Mississippi in 2009. At Sarah Lawrence they performed in an original dance production, Explicit Layers of Sound (2005). They pursued further studies in history at Vanderbilt University.

== #YourSlipIsShowing online campaign ==
By June 2014, I'Nasah Kiam had already been active on various social media as an "indie public scholar", discussing issues of race and society, as well as helping to identify and promote Black art. At this time, a coordinated trolling campaign targeted online communities of women, particularly Black feminists, through a false flag operation using the hashtag #EndFathersDay.

Originating with discussion on 4chan, participants in the trolling created fake accounts and pretended to be black feminists who wanted to "end fathers day" due to perceived failings of men. The "attacks" on men posted by participants spread misinformation and often used fake African American Vernacular English to attempt to generate aggressive, hateful responses towards Black women in general and Black feminists in particular. Twitter (where the majority of the trolling posts were published) was slow to respond.

One of the most effective responses to the disinformation campaign was the identification and aggregation of posts participating in the trolling campaign, using the hashtag #YourSlipIsShowing. This campaign was originated by Shafiqah Hudson, and I'Nasah Kiam was active and influential.

While Hudson created the hashtag (#YourSlipIsShowing), I'Nasah Kiam uncovered and then worked to publicly expose twitter and 4chan posters who were creating fake accounts and using the #EndFathersDay hashtag to inspire hatred towards Black women. In particular, I'Nasah Kiam found and exposed the original 4chan post on which many of the #EndFathersDay posts were modelled. I'Nasah Kiam and Hudson spent several weeks using the online networks and communities that make up Black Twitter to bring attention to what was happening, showing the politically motivated roots of the campaign. After the events associated with #EndFathersDay and #YourSlipIsShowing, I'Nasah Kiam received many rape, death, and doxxing threats online.

Both Kiam and Hudson, as well as scholars of social media, disinformation, and online attacks have identified this event (both the #EndFathersDay campaign, and the successful #YourSlipIsShowing response) as a missed opportunity to learn from what happened to Black feminists, before Gamergate and other similar harassment campaigns. Journalists and scholars have located this event as a precursor to not only Gamergate, but also to the online trolling and harassment tactics associated with the 2016 presidential campaign of Donald Trump.

== Other activity ==
I'Nasah Kiam continues to write critically about technology, focusing particularly on the risks that poorly-moderated, large social media platforms can present for marginalized communities. They have identified these communities as a type of canary in the coal mine. Kiam continues to give public talks and write about what they see as the broad importance of this issue for the Black community as well as for white communities online and offline. Kiam pursued a master's in fine arts degree in North Carolina in 2019 and currently runs multiple online accounts showcasing their own and others' photography, including a Black art curation site, and sites dedicated to cultural theory, Afropessimism, and Black community and politics.
