= Digital blackface =

Using digital depictions of black people for self-expression

Digital blackface is a term used to describe the phenomenon of non-Black individuals using digital media, such as GIFs, memes, or audio clips featuring Black individuals, to express emotions or convey ideas. This behavior has sparked debate and criticism due to concerns about cultural appropriation and the perpetuation of stereotypes. Digital blackface has been described as "one of the most insidious forms of contemporary racism" and has been compared to historical minstrelsy (using blackface) by Black individuals and social justice advocates.

== Definition and identification ==
In his 2006 master’s thesis, Joshua Lumpkin Green coined the term "digital blackface" to describe how technology allows non-black individuals to assume Black identities. While the definition of digital blackface can vary depending on the source and context, it has been used since to describe the phenomenon of non-Black people using digital media, such as images, videos, and voices of Black individuals, to explain emotions or phenomena. Merriam-Webster defines it as "the use by white people of digital depictions of Black or brown people or skin tones especially for the purpose of self-representation or self-expression". According to Aaron Nyerges, a Senior Lecturer in American Studies at the United States Studies Centre, digital blackface "describes the act of producing, posting or circulating 'black reaction gifs' online and especially on social media threads." Writer John Blake suggests that if a white person shares an image online that perpetuates stereotypes of Black people as loud, dumb, hyperviolent, or hypersexual, they've "entered digital blackface territory". The term has also been applied to situations where racial stereotypes are imitated and adopted online using memes, gifs, and "humorous" online identities that mimic and evoke offensive "thug" or "ghetto" stereotypes.

Writer Vann Newkirk explained to NPR in 2017 that instances of digital blackface can be "difficult to identify." He noted that one key indicator is when individuals attempt to mimic Black speech in a "cartoonish" manner, "the way someone who has never engaged with Black culture thinks Black people talk." One of the defining features of digital blackface is the adoption of exaggerated racialized reactions, which are popular in social media platforms like Twitter, TikTok, and Instagram. These reactions often reinforce stereotypes of Black people as overly expressive or dramatic. Culture critic Lauren Michele Jackson describes digital blackface as white individuals portraying Black stereotypes, such as being excessively happy, sassy, loud, or "ghetto", without understanding the cultural context behind these expressions, noting that Black characters are seldom portrayed with subtle traits or feelings.

Blackfishing, the act of non-Black social media users presenting themselves online in ways that suggest they may be Black, can also be seen as a form of digital blackface. This practice can involve altering one's appearance to appear racially ambiguous or falsely implying Black identity, sometimes in an attempt to align with marketable ideas related to Black social justice activism. A particularly notable case of this in recent memory was the 2014 election of Rachel Dolezal as the president of the Spokane chapter of the NAACP based on a false claim to Black ancestry on her application.

It has been highlighted that TikTok's unique format, centered around video content, has led to a distinct form of digital blackface on the platform. Unlike text-based or image-based instances seen on other platforms like Facebook and Twitter, where Black vernacular or memes of Black celebrities are often appropriated, TikTok users embody "Blackness" through personalized videos. This includes mimicking Black rhythms, gestures, affect, and slang with a high degree of creative control. The success of these videos often hinges on the creator's ability to capture and maintain audience attention, effectively making the appropriated Blackness a tool for gaining visibility.

== Examples ==
In his 2006 thesis, as an example, Joshua Lumpkin Green suggests that the medium of a video game (using Grand Theft Auto: San Andreas as an example) provides a safe space for players to experience racialized violence and sexualization through a Black protagonist. Expanding on Green's work, art historian Kate Brown applies the concept of digital blackface to the use of reaction gifs on Tumblr, particularly those featuring Black women and queer Black men. Brown notes that these gifs, often taking on qualities of minstrelsy, have become a common form of communication.

Culture critic Lauren Michele Jackson has been credited with popularizing the term digital blackface in her 2017 op-ed for Teen Vogue, where she discussed the importance of addressing digital blackface in reaction GIFs. That year, other media outlets also began discussing this topic and asked non-Black individuals whether it was acceptable to use Black emojis and GIFs.

In 2014, Vice News described popular food blog Thug Kitchen as the "latest iteration of digital blackface" after it sparked controversy for using African American Vernacular English in their recipes while being run by two white individuals from California.

In April 2016, the image messaging app SnapChat received criticism for its release of a Bob Marley filter, calling the filter digital blackface. The filter made the user's complexion darker and added dreadlocks to resemble the late singer. Others complained that the filter diminished Marley's cultural importance.

In a 2019 paper published in First Monday, Ariadna Matamoros-Fernández, a senior lecturer in Digital Media at Queensland University of Technology, associated the "El Negro de WhatsApp" meme, widely popular in Spain and Latin America, with the concept of digital blackface.

In 2023, it was reported that generative AI's use in creating "BIPOC" imitating models had sparked controversy, with critics labeling it as digital blackface.

In his 2023 CNN analysis piece on digital Blackface, writer John Blake highlights instances where "White" individuals share content like the "Ain't Nobody Got Time for That" video, Crying Jordan and Tyra Banks memes, and a popular GIF of drag queen RuPaul. He suggests that such actions could constitute the unintentional perpetuation of "one of the most insidious forms of contemporary racism." A 2022 article in Women's Health asserts that non-Black people using popular GIFs featuring Black individuals, such as Stanley Hudson from The Office or Raven-Symoné, can be considered a form of digital blackface. The article suggests that the use of viral audio on platforms like TikTok and Instagram Reels, where non-Black individuals co-opt audio featuring Black voices for their own content, could also be considered a form of digital blackface. Examples include using popular songs or catchphrases associated with Black creators, such as the "material girl" song or sound bites like "what was the reason" or "it must be nice."

== Criticism ==
Digital blackface has been described as a "digital expression of societally engrained oppression" experienced by Black individuals, who are often commodified and treated as a labor tool rather than as individuals. Critics argue that it is problematic, as it reinforces negative stereotypes about Black people, reducing their complexity to a single, often negative, narrative. This includes portraying Black individuals as overly animated, loud, aggressive, angry, hypersexual, or overly comedic, and, particularly for women, as excessively sassy. Psychologist Jardin Dogan contends that digital blackface, in addition to perpetuating stereotypes, also involves cultural appropriation, as non-Black individuals can adopt a Black identity that they can discard at will, contrasting with the daily confrontation Black individuals face with their race, lacking the privilege to shed it when it's no longer convenient or trendy.

=== Comparisons to minstrelsy ===
Critics argue that digital blackface is rooted in minstrelsy, a 19th and early 20th-century form of entertainment where White performers portrayed Black characters in a demeaning and stereotypical manner, perpetuating racist ideas and contributing to the marginalization of Black people. Digital blackface has been described as "minstrel performance that become available in cyberspace" and as a "virtual, contemporary form" of minstrel shows. According to a 2021 study published in Television & New Media, the online portrayals and behaviors associated with digital blackface mirror the racist foundations of minstrelsy, where non-Black individuals would pretend to be Black through dressing up and performing, often using shoe polish, burned cork, or stage makeup to darken their skin in a practice known as Blackface. Digital blackface is argued to be rooted in minstrelsy not only in the performance's nature but also in the fact that white performers profit socially and financially from the likenesses of Black individuals.

Digital blackface content is often created with the intention of being humorous, according to community psychologist Riana Elyse Anderson. However, she explains that due to the historical roots of minstrelsy and its association with entertainment, non-Black people may perceive these portrayals as exaggerated caricatures rather than representations of individuals who can be experts, leaders, or taken seriously in any capacity.

== See also ==
- Astroturfing
- Blackface in contemporary art
- Catfishing
- Impersonator
- Racial misrepresentation
- Racism on the Internet
