= Riana Elyse Anderson =

American clinical and community psychologist

- Born: Detroit, Michigan, United States
- Education: University of Michigan (BS); University of Virginia (MA); University of Virginia (PhD)
- Known for: Racism, healing, youth, and families
- Scientific career
- Fields: Clinical psychology Community health Health behavior
- Institutions: University of Michigan, Yale University
- Thesis: And Still WE Rise: Poverty Risk, Parent-Child Relationships, and Child School Readiness in Urban Black Families (2015)
- Doctoral advisor: Nancy Deutsch, Melvin Wilson
- Website: https://www.rianaelyse.com/

Riana Elyse Anderson is an American clinical and community psychologist focused on racial discrimination and Black families. She is an assistant professor in the Department of Health Behavior and Health Education at the University of Michigan School of Public Health. She was trained in Clinical and Community Psychology at the University of Virginia, at Yale University School of Medicine, and at the University of Pennsylvania. Anderson studies how racial discrimination impacts the mental health of Black adolescents and their families. She works with therapeutic programs and community partners and shares knowledge through media, writing, and talks. She has received numerous grants, awards, and fellowships in support of her work.

== Education ==
Anderson was born in Detroit, Michigan and received her B.A. in psychology and political science at the University of Michigan in 2006. She received her MA in psychology from the University of Virginia in 2011. She received her PhD from University of Virginia in 2015. She joined the University of Southern California School of Social Work in 2017 and moved to the School of Public Health faculty at the University of Michigan in 2018.

== Career and research ==
Anderson has worked in the areas of clinical psychology, community psychology, and public health. She is best known for her work on racial discrimination, trauma, and healing among Black children, adolescents, and families. She developed the EMBRace intervention (Engaging, Managing, and Bonding through Race) to alleviate racial stress and trauma in parents and adolescents to facilitate healthy parent-child relationships, parent and adolescent psychological well-being, and racial assertiveness as coping mechanism. This intervention has been published in top tier journals, been implemented with youth in school contexts, and has been covered in national news. She has received multiple grants for her work from the National Science Foundation, the National Institutes of Health, the Spencer Foundation, the Robert Wood Johnson Foundation, and the William T. Grant Foundation.

== Public impact ==
Anderson has contributed to a range of blogs, articles, and media, including features with CNN, The New York Times, The Times London, Huffington Post, Psychology Today, PBS' Women's Health, WebMD, and NBC's Newsroom.

Anderson is an appointed member of national working groups including the American Psychological Association Children, Youth, and Families committee and the Society for Research on Adolescence Anti-Racism Task Force. She serves as the co-host of Our Mental Health Minute, a multimedia organization geared towards reducing stigma in the Black community. She is active in community outreach, giving talks in local communities about racism and Black families.

== Selected works ==
- Anderson, R. E., Jones, S. C. T., & Stevenson, H. The initial development and validation of the racial socialization competency scale: Quality and quantity. Journal of Cultural Diversity & Ethnic Minority Psychology.
- Anderson, R., Lee, D., Hope, M., Nisbeth, K., Bess, K., & Zimmerman, M. Disrupting the behavioral health consequences of racial discrimination: A longitudinal investigation of racial identity profiles and alcohol-related problems. Health Education & Behavior.
- Anderson, R. E., Metzger, I., Applewhite, K., Sawyer, B., Jackson, W., Flores, S., McKenny, M., & Carter, R. Hands up, now what?: Black families' reactions to racial socialization interventions. Journal of Youth Development.
- Williams, J. L., Tolan, P. H., Durkee, M. I., Francois, A. G., & Anderson, R. E. (2012). Integrating racial and ethnic identity research into developmental understanding of adolescents. Child Development Perspectives, 6(3), 304–311.
- Anderson, R. E., & Stevenson, H. C. (2019). RECASTing racial stress and trauma: Theorizing the healing potential of racial socialization in families. American Psychologist, 74(1), 63.
