= Manuel Arturo Abreu =

Dominican-American artist

Manuel Arturo Abreu (born 1991) is a Dominican artist, poet, critic, and curator from the Bronx. Abreu has written two books, poems, and essays, and participated in and curated group art installations. Their book Incalculable Loss is a finalist for the 2019 Oregon Book Awards: Sarah Winnemucca Award for Creative nonfiction, while their poetry collection transtrender was a finalist for the 2018 Oregon Book Awards: Stafford/Hall Award for Poetry. Abreu co-facilitates a free pop-up art school called home school in Portland, OR.

== Education ==
Abreu received his BA in Linguistics from Reed College in Portland, Oregon in 2014. Their thesis was on accusative clitic doubling in Dominican Spanish.

== Writing ==
In addition to two books of poetry and one book of prose, Abreu has written a number of essays, and published conversations with artists and poets. Their poetry is focused on many subjects, including art, race, gender, and other topics. They have published at Rhizome, Art in America, AQNB, and elsewhere.

They are known for highly polemical essays dealing with antiblackness in culture and art. They wrote an essay about, "Online Imagined Black English," a phenomenon where users of social media users imagine the qualities of African American Vernacular English due to increased exposure to Black media, adopt it for expressive purposes that generally rely on stereotypes of Black people as lazy, criminal, cool, hypersexual, and otherwise. They also wrote an essay about the commodifying nature of social practice art which reflects on ideas from Claire Bishop.

== Art shows ==
Abreu participated in group art installations at Rhizome and the New Museum (online), the Cooley Gallery (Portland), Chicken Coop Contemporary (Portland), Veronica project space (Seattle), AA/LA Gallery (Los Angeles), and the Art Gym (Marylhurst University).

- Black Artists of Oregon, Portland Art Museum, Portland, OR (2023)
- Cry Me a River, Simian, Copenhagen, Denmark (2023)
- THE ARCHIVE AS... Kunstverein München, Munich, Germany (2023)
- With CASSANDRA Press, On Self-Defense, Bergen Kunsthall, Bergen, Norway (2023)
- Transactions with Eternity, Kraupa-Tuskany Zeidler, Berlin (2022)
- With CASSANDRA Press. Quiet as It’s Kept, Whitney Museum of American Art (2022)
- ECLIPSE: Athens Biennale 7, Athens (2021)
- Study Room. HALLE FÜR KUNST Steiermark, Graz (2021)
- Life Constantly Escapes, Kunstraum Niederösterreich, Vienna (2021)
- pen pressure, Haus Wien, Vienna (2020)
- Not Total, Portland Community College Paragon Gallery, Portland, OR (2019)
- Radical Reading Room, Studio Museum in Harlem, New York, NY (2019)
- I Scare Easily, Yaby, Madrid (2019)
- obsequies, AA|LA Gallery, Los Angeles (2018)
- a re:trospective; a group show curated as part of the home school project in collaboration with the Re:Art Show; Old Pfizer Factory, Brooklyn, NY (2018)
- This is a Black Spatial Imaginary, PCC Cascade Paragon Gallery, Portland, OR (2017)
- From Concrete to Liquid... Centre d’Art Contemporain, Geneva, Switzerland (2017)
- Cabin Pressure, BBQLA, Los Angeles, CA (2017)
- Quota, SOIL Gallery, Seattle, WA (2017)
- First Look: New Black Portraitures, New Museum, NY (2017)
- resilience, Institute for New Connotative Action, Seattle (2016)

== Awards ==
Year	Award name	Placement	Project
2019	Precipice Fund Grant	Recipient	home school
2019	Yale Union residency	Recipient	home school
2019	Centrum Emerging Artist Residency	Recipient	N/A
2019	Oregon Book Awards: Sarah Winnemucca Award for Creative nonfiction	Finalist	Incalculable Loss (Institute for New Connotative Action Press)
2018	Oregon Literary Fellowship	Fellow	N/A
2018	Oregon Book Awards: Stafford/Hall Award for Poetry	Finalist	transtrender (Quimérica Books / Ugly Duckling Presse)
2017	Precipice Fund Grant	Recipient	home school
2017	Precipice Fund Grant	Recipient	black apotrope
2017	Open Media Signal Fellowship	Fellow	N/A
2017	Rhizome Microgrant	Awardee	home school
2016	Regional Arts & Culture Council Grant	Awardee	home school
2015	Precipice Fund Grant	Recipient	home school

== Bibliography ==
- Abreu, Manuel Arturo; Ford, Eleanor (2018). Incalculable loss. INCA Press. ISBN 9780997763935. OCLC 1085290773. Nominated for the Sarah Winnemucca Award for Creative Nonfiction 2019.
- Abreu, Manuel Arturo (2016). transtrender. ISBN 9781937027841. OCLC 975486061.
- Abreu, Manuel Arturo (2015). List of Consonants. Bottlecap Press. ISBN 978-1-946340-07-8.
