= Shafiqah Hudson =

American Black feminist (1978–2024)

- Born: January 10, 1978; Columbia, South Carolina, U.S.
- Died: February 15, 2024 (aged 46); Portland, Oregon, U.S.
- Education: Hobart and William Smith Colleges

Shafiqah Hudson (January 10, 1978 – February 15, 2024) was an American Black feminist. She launched the #YourSlipIsShowing hashtag, exposing a disinformation campaign in which anti-feminist trolls posed as Black feminists.

== Early life and education ==
Hudson was born January 10, 1978, in Columbia, South Carolina and grew up mostly in Florida with her mother, a computer engineer, and her brother, after her parents divorced. Her father was a martial arts instructor and author. She also had three sisters.

Hudson attended Palm Beach County School of the Arts, then earned a BA in Africana studies with a minor in political science in 2000 from Hobart and William Smith Colleges.

After college, Hudson moved to New York City, where she worked for non-profits, and as a freelance writer who wrote for publications such as Essence, The Toast, xoJane, Model View Culture and the website of Ebony.

== Online work against disinformation ==
Hudson became aware of digital blackface in the mid-2000s, and began calling it out on Twitter after she joined in 2009.

Beginning in 2014, under the Twitter handle @sassycrass, she was responsible for the #YourSlipIsShowing hashtag, which exposed anti-feminist trolls who were pretending to be Black feminists. She became suspicious of the accounts due to an inability to verify the identities of the accounts, the contempt shown by the trolls for the people they were attempting to imitate, the outlandish nature of the tweets and their inaccurate use of African American Vernacular English. She aggregated their posts under the #YourSlipIsShowing hashtag. The trolls' invention of the fake #EndFathersDay hashtag, as part of a broader 4chan-based campaign called Operation: Lollipop, has been identified as a precursor to Gamergate and the disinformation spread during the 2016 election that resulted in Donald Trump becoming president of the United States.

Despite the significance of her work on disinformation, Hudson was never compensated.

== Death ==
Hudson died at an extended-stay hotel in Portland, Oregon on February 15, 2024, at the age of 46. Hudson was survived by her father, her brother and her sisters. She had suffered from Crohn's disease and respiratory illnesses, her brother told The New York Times. She also told social media followers that she had Long COVID, a recent cancer diagnosis and that she had no money to pay for her care.

== Publications ==
- "Black In The Imaginationscape". Model View Culture.
