= Ngo Pa =

1913 poem by King Rama V of Siam

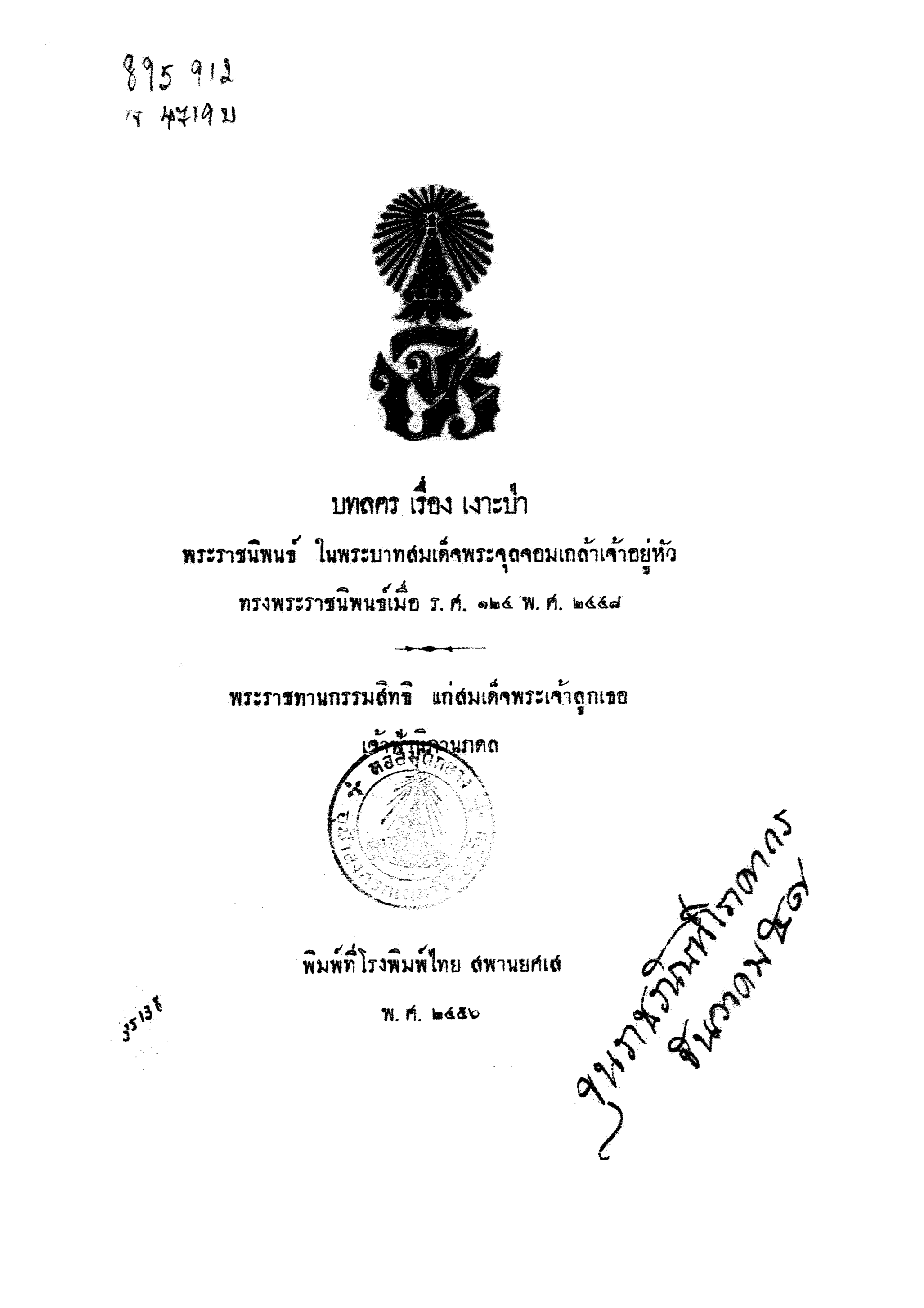
Title page of the first printing, from the Chulalongkorn University Library

Ngo Pa (Thai: เงาะป่า, pronounced [ŋɔ́ʔ pàː]), also known in translation as Romance of the Sakai, is a Thai poem in the form of a lakhon nai traditional play written by King Chulalongkorn (Rama V) in 1906 and first published in 1913. The King wrote the play while spending eight days recovering from a bout of malaria, and took inspiration from his impressions of the Maniq people, a Negrito group in Southern Thailand. The story is a tragedy featuring a love triangle involving Sompla and Hanao, rivals competing for the affection of the beautiful Lamhab. The work is noted for employing the novel concept of ethnography in its conceptualization of the story's background, as well as its simple-yet-engaging klon verse, and has been commonly included as reading material for Thai secondary school students.
