= Tevfik Gelenbe =

Turkish actor

Tevfik Gelenbe (1931, Istanbul – 20 October 2004, Istanbul) was a well-known and prolific Turkish actor and comedian.

He was born in Istanbul, Turkey. He is best known for his character "Bacı Kalfa" in the 1980s TV serial Uğurlugil Ailesi. He was also the founder, in 1969, of the organization "Tevfik Gelenbe Tiyatrosu", which provided free theatre education to young actors. He died at the age of 73 due to complications of cancer.
