= Carrie Swain =

American performer (1860–1944)

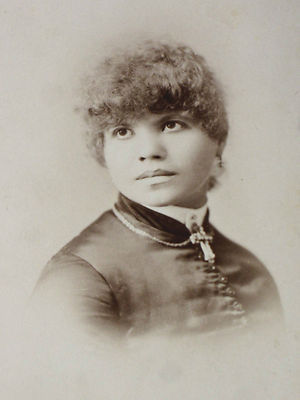
- Carrie Swain in blackface as Topsy in Uncle Tom's Cabin, 1882
- Born: Caroline Madeline Wisler; April 7, 1860; Philadelphia, Pennsylvania, US
- Died: June 20, 1944 (aged 84); Paris, France
- Burial place: Batignolles Cemetery, Paris, France
- Other names: Caroline Gardner
- Occupation(s): Acrobat, actress, singer
- Known for: One of the first women in minstrel

Caroline Madeline Gardner (née Wisler; April 7, 1860 – June 20, 1944), better known by her stage name Carrie Swain, was an American actress, acrobat, and singer. One of the first female acrobats and belting vocalists to appear in vaudeville, she began her career performing in variety and minstrel shows during the 1870s. She first rose to national prominence in the early 1880s, touring in the musical The Tourists of the Palace Car. In 1882 she created the role of Topsy in composer Caryl Florio and dramatist H. Wayne Ellis's musical adaptation of Uncle Tom's Cabin, and then toured nationally in several plays written for her, among them Leonard Grover's Cad, the Tomboy and Frederick G. Maeder's Mat, the Romp.

== Early life and career ==
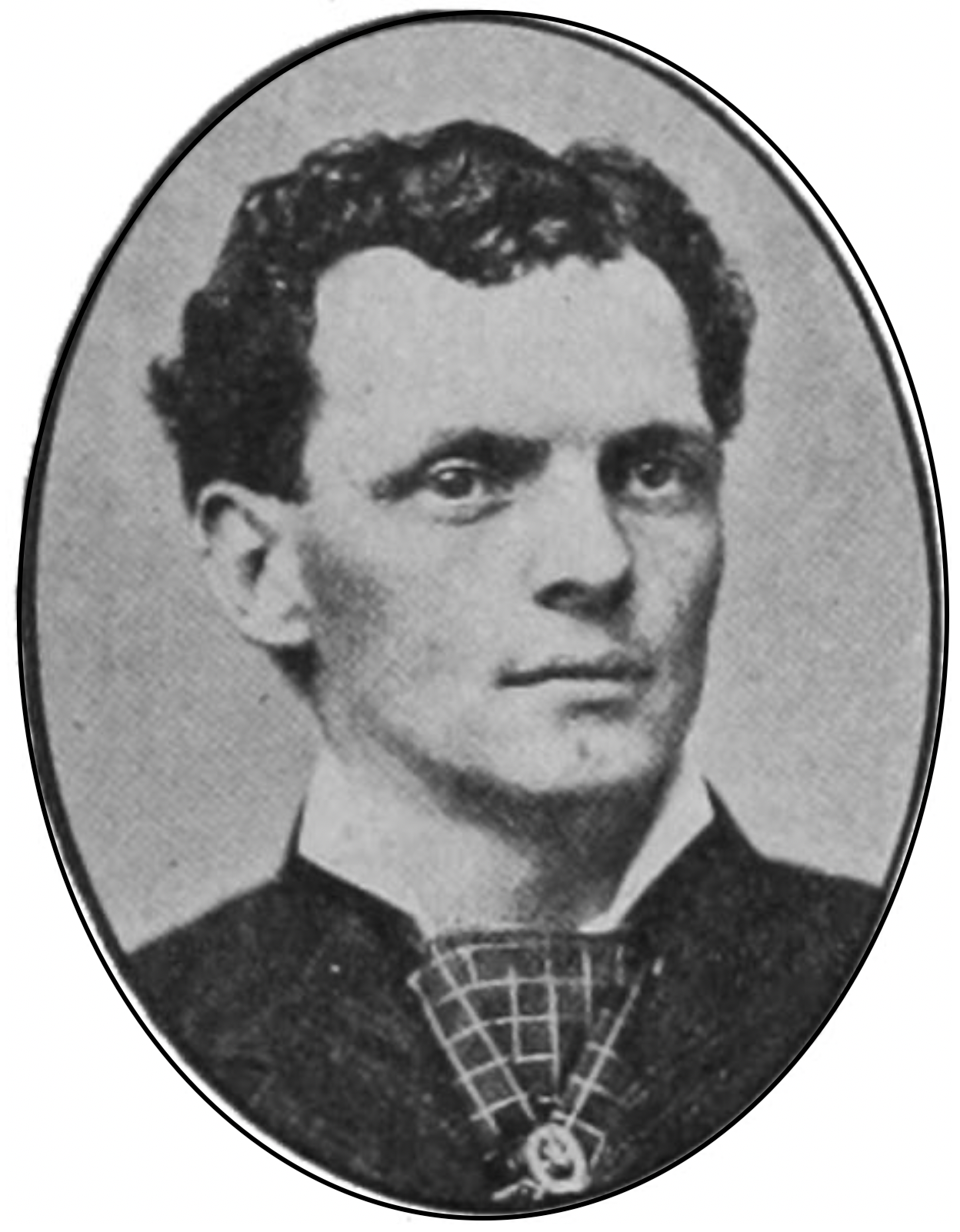
Sam Swain, Carrie's first husband

The daughter of Ignatz Wisler and Caroline Blust, Caroline Madeline Wisler was born in Philadelphia, Pennsylvania, on April 7, 1860. The family relocated to San Francisco where Swain grew up. She was one of the earliest female acrobats to perform on the vaudeville stage. According to theatre scholar Shirley Staples, "Carrie Swain may have been the first woman to attempt the acrobatic comedy typical of male blackface work," and she was one of the first women to perform in blackface.

Swain began her career in the 1870s performing in both minstrel shows and variety programs. She performed under the name Carrie Swain, after marrying Samuel Colburn Swain (1848–1928). Her performances in the 1870s were mainly done with Sam as her acrobatic partner, beginning as early as 1877 and extending to as late as 1880. Their marriage ended in divorce.

As a pioneering female acrobat, Swain challenged 19th-century perceptions of women as the "weaker sex". Her physicality and athletic ability were featured prominently in her marketing; often to intentionally shock and intrigue 19th-century consumers. These adverts both challenged and reinforced 19th-century stereotypes of women. For example, one of the advertisements for her show asked the question "Can a woman turn a somersault and remain a lady?"

In addition to her work as an acrobat, Swain was also one of the first belting vocalists to perform in vaudeville. Historical accounts of the period labeled her as a "rough soubrette" because of the strength of her voice. When she appeared at Shelby's Theatre in Buffalo, New York, in 1877, The Buffalo Sunday Morning News described her as "the only lady acrobatic song and dance artist in the world." From February 16 through May 1, 1877, she appeared in nine stage works written by David Belasco at Egyptian Hall in San Francisco; starring in these works with her future second husband Frank Gardner.

In March 1878, Swain and her husband Sam performed at the Boylston Museum in Boston, Massachusetts. They were engaged at Foresters Music Hall in London in October 1878, and also appeared that same month at the People's Palace in Liverpool. She returned to the United States where she spent the first part of December 1878 performing at Aberle's Tivoli Theatre in New York City.

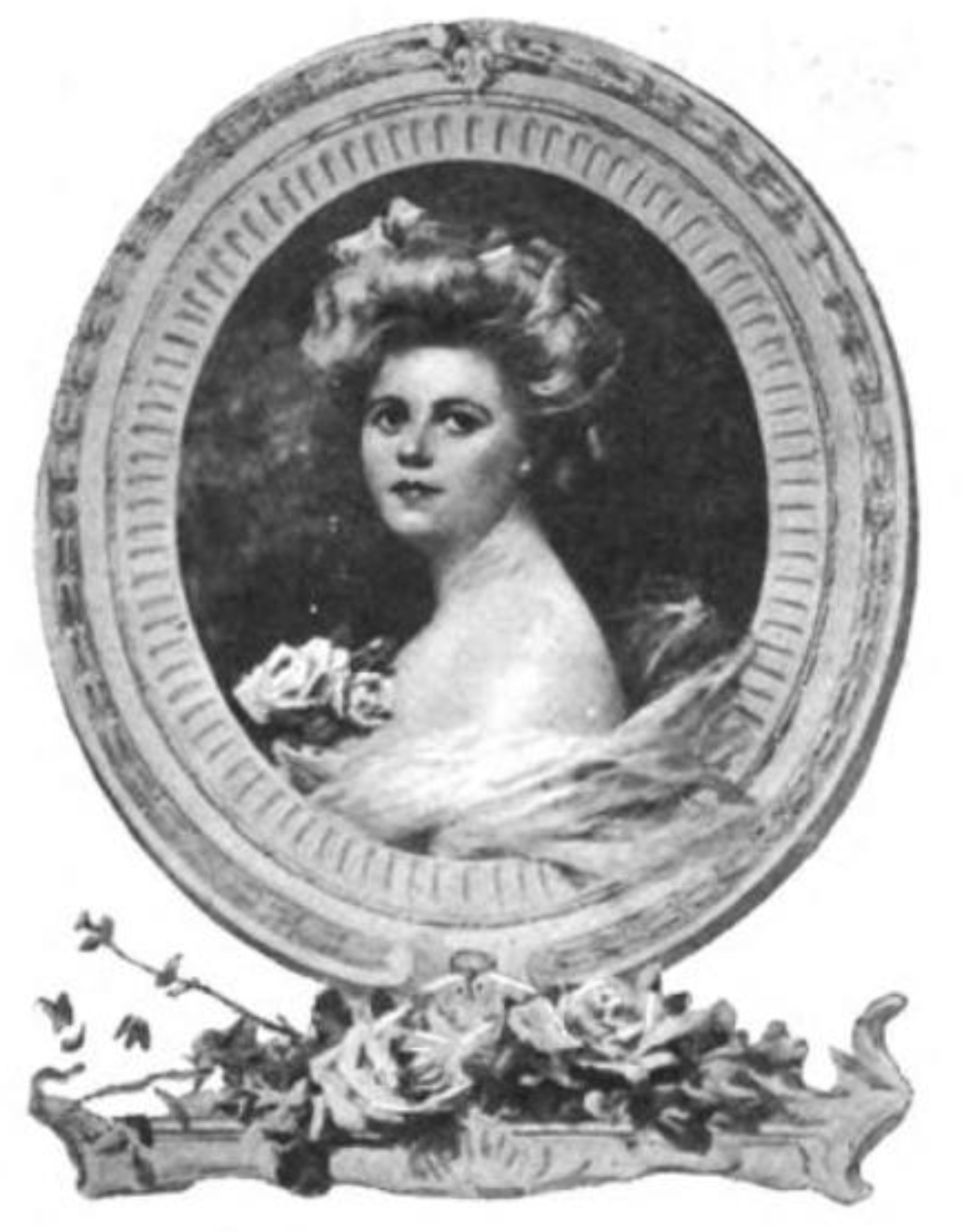
Portrait of Carrie Swain by painter Louise Abbéma. Published in The Lone Hand (1907).

The Swains spent the Christmas season of 1878 into January 1879 performing in a production of Humpty Dumpty at the New National Theatre in Hartford, Connecticut. The following March they were performing in Detroit at the Coliseum Novelty Theatre located on Michigan Avenue across the street from Detroit City Hall; in a vaudeville sketch entitled "The Servant's Holiday".

In October – November 1879, Carrie and Sam Swain had a big hit with their comedic sketch "One Hundred Virgins" which they presented at the Vine Street Opera House in Cincinnati. The Cincinnati Enquirer described the sketch as a "spicy comedy" and that the Swains "took the house by storm" and were the "biggest success" of the evening and "one of the hits of the season". The pair remained at that theatre in December 1879, performing in a pirated production of Gilbert and Sullivan's H.M.S. Pinafore. Sam portrayed Dick Deadeye and Carrie portrayed Josephine. By the end of the month they had left Cincinnati and were at the Howard Athenaeum in Boston performing "The Servant's Holiday".

In February 1880, the Swains were back at the Vine Street Opera House in a new sketch entitled "Johnson's Party". The following month they performed in a variety show at the Detroit Opera House. In April 1880 they were at Saint Louis's Theatre Comique (formerly Bates Theatre, opened 1851) at Fourth St and Pine, performing in blackface in the sketch "The Colored Waiters". At the end of that month, the couple joined the theatre company of John P. Smith, signing a two-year contract. They made their debut with the company in The Tourists of the Palace Car (also known as The Tourists) at Haverly's Theatre in Chicago on April 15, 1880; with Carrie as the maid and Sam as the porter. Soon after, Carrie was given the leading role of Miss. Baby in the production.

== National prominence ==
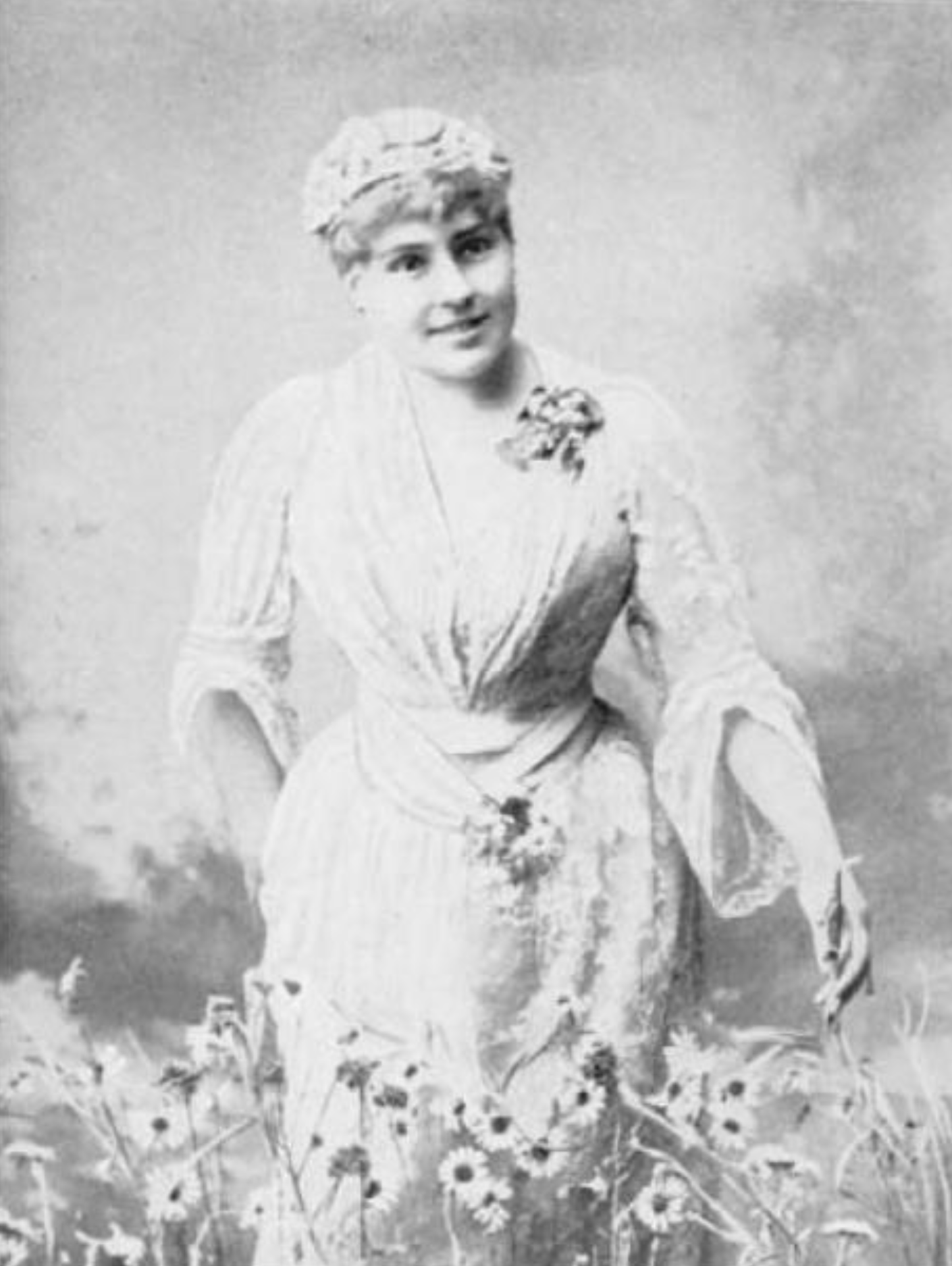
Carrie Swain in 1886

Carrie spent two seasons touring in The Tourists of the Palace Car (also called The Tourists in the Pullman Palace Car or just The Tourists), and the role of Miss Baby significantly raised her profile as an actress on the national stage. Her songs in this production included "The Bees Are Swarming, Charlie" which used words and music by Belle Cole, and "'Tis Time to Say Good Night" with music by Alfred Cellier. William A. Mestayer (1846–1896) was the producer of this show and J. H. Haverly was its manager. The plot of the show revolved around tourists traveling on a train to California who get caught up in a diamond robbery aboard the train.

Tour stops for The Tourists included performances at the Whitney Theater in Ann Arbor, Michigan, the Academy of Music in Buffalo, New York, both the Gaiety Theatre and the Park Theatre in Boston, the New Portland Theatre in Maine, English's Opera House in Indianapolis, Pike's Opera House in Cincinnati, Haverly's Theater in Chicago, the Fulton Opera House in Lancaster, Pennsylvania, the Walnut Street Theatre in Philadelphia, and the National Theatre in Washington, D.C. The tour also included a stop on Broadway at Haverly's Lyceum Theatre, beginning a run there on September 13, 1880.

In May 1881 Swain left the company of The Tourists, and returned to Chicago where she appeared in Nib and Tuck opposite the Jewish comedian Harry Webber at the Academy of Music in Chicago. She returned to performing in vaudeville; appearing in theaters in Indianapolis Baltimore, and Washington, D.C., into early September 1881. By September 11, 1881, she was starring in a minstrel show at the Grand Central Theatre in Philadelphia.

In October 1881 Swain joined a touring theatre troupe managed by Henry C. Miner, and by the end of that month was performing with that troupe at the Grand Opera House in Wheeling, West Virginia, in a show called "Harry Miner's Comedy Four Combinations". She toured with that company for several months, performing at Whallen's Buckingham Theatre in Louisville, Kentucky, the Coliseum Theatre in Cincinnati, Hyde & Behmans Theater in Brooklyn, the Grand Central Theatre in Philadelphia, the Windsor Theatre in Boston, the Park Theatre in Indianapolis, and the Olympic Theatre in Chicago. She was still performing in this show in April 1882 when the production reached Cleveland's Academy of Music.

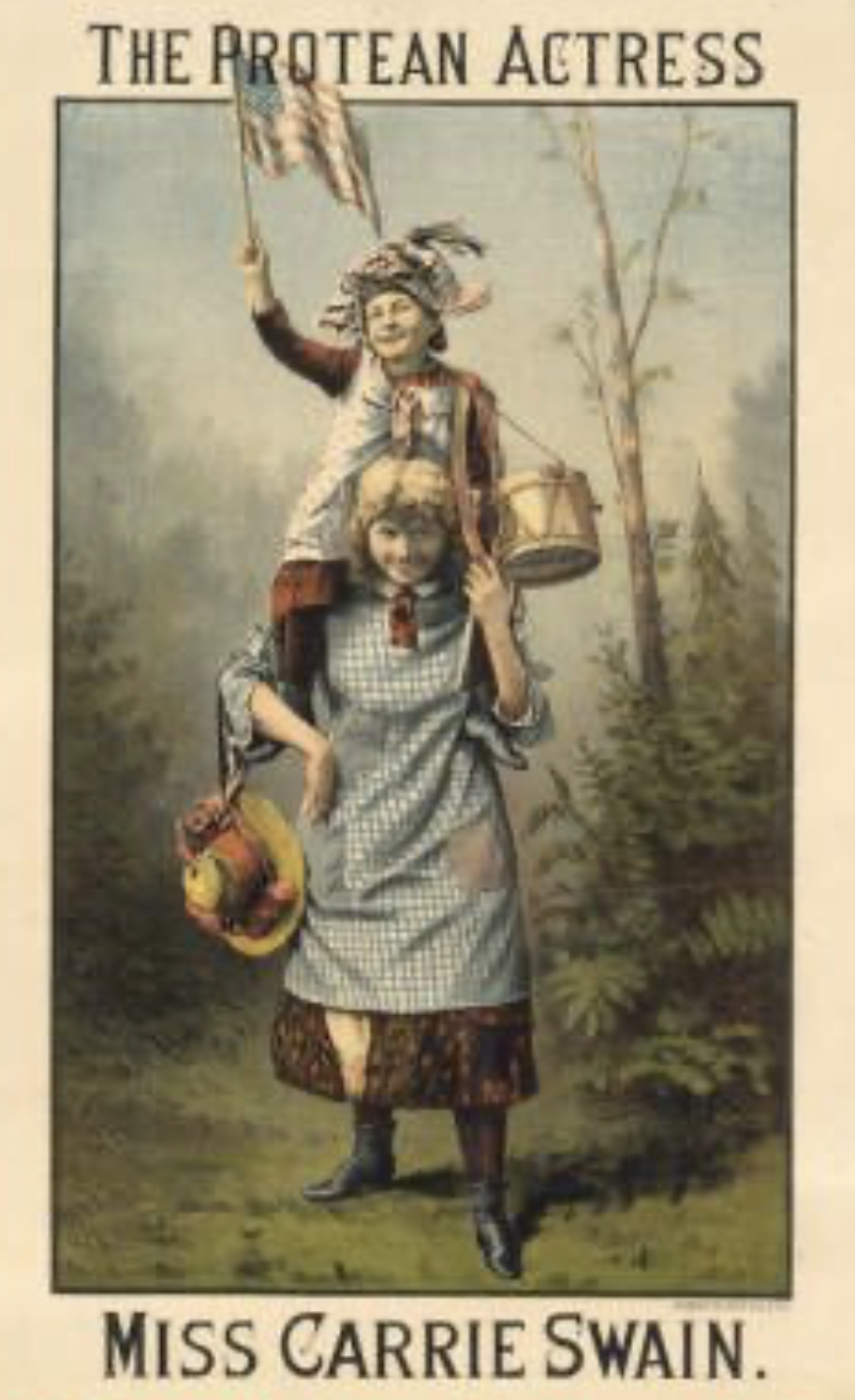
Advertisement for Carrie Swain, The Protean Actress

On May 22, 1882, Swain starred as Topsy in the world premiere of a musical adaptation of Harriet Beecher Stowe anti-slavery novel Uncle Tom's Cabin at the Chestnut Street Opera House in Philadelphia. The musical was created by composer Caryl Florio and dramatist H. Wayne Ellis. This was followed by a new play written specifically for Swain by playwright Leonard Grover, Cad, The Tomboy, which she first performed in Waterbury, Connecticut, on August 30, 1882. It was a comedy drama written in five acts which was carefully crafted around Swain's unique abilities as an actress, dancer, acrobat, and singer; a variation of skills which earned her the moniker "The Protean Actress". She toured widely as Cad, The Tomboy, initially appearing in theaters throughout New England in August – October 1882. The Boston Globe reviewed the production when it reached the Chelsea Academy of Music in Chelsea, Massachusetts, stating:

The piece has met with a vast amount of success in the various New England cities in which it has been played. Carrie Swain's interpretation of Cad, the Tomboy, was inimitable. Her vivacious style of acting renders her specially adapted to the part and quite enraptured the audience by her charming rendering of the song "Sweetest One", which she introduced.

Swain spent the remainder of 1882 touring throughout North America in the part of Cad, performing the role in theaters in both small and large cities. Some places she performed the role included Cleveland, Terre Haute, Indiana, Richmond Hill, Ontario, Bloomington, Illinois, Saint Louis, Missouri, New Orleans, the Richmond Theatre in Virginia, and McVicker's Theater in Chicago.

On January 4, 1883, Swain performed the title role in the world premiere of Frederick G. Maeder's Mat, the Romp; another play specifically written for her. The premiere took place at Lancaster's Fulton Opera House. She added a second new play to her repertoire soon after, Mab, The Miner's Daughter, and toured these plays together. At some point on the tour, Swain dropped Matt, the Romp; and by October 1883 Cad, the Tomboy had returned to her repertoire alongside Mab, The Miner's Daughter. Cad, the Tomboy remained in her touring repertoire in 1884–1885, and was paired with the occasional new play, including Maeder's Morning Glory (1884) and True Blue (1885).

== Later life and career ==
In 1886 Swain returned to Broadway, appearing at the Union Square Theatre in the title trouser role in Jack in the Box. That same year, she married Frank Gardner who had been working as Swain's theatrical manager prior to their marriage. She traveled to Australia where she gave her first performance on that continent as Cad, The Tomboy at the Theatre Royal, Sydney; opening in that production on February 5, 1887. She was a highly successful and financially profitable actress in Australia and New Zealand during the late 1880s, having long tours of Cad, the Tomboy and Uncle Tom's Cabin with her own company.

In 1907 and 1908, there were reports of her reverting to performing under her maiden name Carrie Wisler or which refer to her as Carrie Wisler-Swain. According to her record in the American Foreign Service Association's U.S., Reports of Deaths of American Citizens Abroad, 1835-1974, Carrie Swain died in her home in Paris at the age of 84 on June 20, 1944. She is buried at the Batignolles Cemetery.

== Bibliography ==
- Bedford, Randolph (1976). Naught to Thirty-three. Melbourne University Press. ISBN 9780522841015.
- Belasco, David; Winter, William (1925). Plays Produced Under the Stage Direction of David Belasco. New York.
- Belasco, David (July–December 1914). "My Life's Story". Hearst's Magazine. XXVI: 48.
- Benjamin, Ruth; Rosenblatt, Arthur (2006). "Carrie Swain". Who Sang what on Broadway, 1866-1996: The singers (A-K). McFarland & Company. ISBN 9780786421893.
- Bordman, Gerald Martin; Norton, Richard (2010). American Musical Theatre: A Chronicle. Oxford University Press. ISBN 9780199729708.
- Brewer, F. C. (1892). The Drama and Music In New South Wales. Sydney: Charles Potter, Government Printer.
- Brown, Thomas Allston (1903). A History of the New York Stage from the First Performance in 1732 to 1901, Volume 3. Dodd, Mead & Co.
- Fields, Armond (2009). Eddie Foy: A Biography of the Early Popular Stage Comedian. McFarland & Company. ISBN 9780786443284.
- Gänzl, Kurt (1986). The British Musical Theatre: 1865-1914. Oxford University Press. ISBN 9780333398395.
- Samuels, Charles; Samuels, Louise (1974). Once Upon a Stage: The Merry World of Vaudeville. Dodd, Mead & Co. ISBN 9780396070306.
- Shinkman, Paul (1983). Shinkman, Elizabeth Benn (ed.). So Little Disillusion: Letters, Articles, Diaries of Paul Shinkman, an American Correspondent in Paris and London, 1924-1931. EPM Publications. ISBN 9780914440680.
- Slide, Anthony (2012). "Acrobats". The Encyclopedia of Vaudeville. University Press of Mississippi. ISBN 9781617032509.
- Smith, Cecil Michener; Litton, Glenn (1981). Musical Comedy in America. Theatre Arts Books. ISBN 9780878305643.
- Staples, Shirley (1984). Male-female Comedy Teams in American Vaudeville, 1865-1932. UMI Research Press. ISBN 9780835715201.
- Staff of The New York Clipper (1885). "Theatrical Chronology". The New York Clipper Annual for 1885. Frank Queen Publishing Company.
- Tallis, Michael; Tallis, Joan (2006). The Silent Showman: Sir George Tallis, the Man Behind the World's Largest Entertainment Organisation of the 1920s. Wakefield Press. ISBN 9781862547353.
