= AOM =

AOM syllable may refer to Om, an Indian mantra and Spiritual symbol.

AOM is a commonly used abbreviation for the following subjects:

== Organizations ==
- Academy of Management, a professional association for scholars of management and organizations
- AOM French Airlines, a former French airline, partly acquired by Swissair
- Art of Movement, a Seattle-based b-boy crew
- Avatar Orchestra Metaverse, a group which uses Second Life to create online musical performances
- Alliance for Open Media, a non-profit association of technology companies that develops an open, royalty-free video format

== Science and engineering ==
- Acousto-optic modulator, a device used in optics to shift the angle, intensity, frequency or phase of light
- Acute otitis media, inflammation of the middle ear
- Anaerobic oxidation of methane, a microbiological process occurring in marine sediments
- Azoxymethane, a potent carcinogen

== Other ==
- Academy of Music (disambiguation)
- Age of Mythology, a video game
- Aviation ordnanceman, a U.S. Navy rank
- Award of Merit, a designation achieved by dogs at a conformation show
