= Chicago Academy of Music =

The Chicago Academy of Music may refer to:

- Academy of Music (Chicago), three theaters in Chicago collectively active from 1872 through 1934
- Chicago Academy of Music, the original name of the Chicago Musical College; it was known by that name from 1867 until its name changed in 1872
