= Academy of Music =

Academy of Music may refer to:

== United States ==
- Academy of Music (Atlantic City, New Jersey)
- Academy of Music (Baltimore), Maryland
- Academy of Music (Buffalo, New York)
- Academy of Music (Charleston), South Carolina
- Academy of Music (Chicago), Illinois
- Academy of Music (Cleveland), Ohio
- Academy of Music (Lynchburg, Virginia)
- Academy of Music (Milwaukee), Wisconsin
- Academy of Music (New York City) in Manhattan
  - A second Academy of Music in Manhattan, renamed the Palladium
- Academy of Music (Philadelphia), Pennsylvania
- Academy of Music (Sioux City, Iowa)
- Academy of Music (Washington, D.C.)
- Academy of Music Theatre, Northampton, Massachusetts
- Boston Academy of Music, Massachusetts
- Brooklyn Academy of Music in New York City

== Elsewhere worldwide ==
- Academy of Music, Adelaide, Australia
- Academy of Music in Budapest, Hungary
- Academy of Music in Kraków, Poland
- Academy of Music (Ljubljana), Slovenia
- Academy of Music, Melbourne, Australia
- Academy of Music (Montreal), Canada
- Baku Academy of Music, Azerbaijan
- London Academy of Music and Dramatic Art at the University of Kent
- Royal Academy of Music in London, England
- Royal Academy of Music (company) by G. F. Handel
- Royal Irish Academy of Music, a college within Dublin City University, Ireland
- Royal Scottish Academy of Music and Drama in Glasgow, Scotland
- Royal Swedish Academy of Music in Sweden
- Sarajevo Music Academy in Bosnia and Herzegovina
- Janáček Academy of Music and Performing Arts in Brno, Czech Republic
- Academy of Music, University of Zagreb, Croatia

== See also ==
- Academy of Ancient Music in Cambridge, England
