= Academy of Music (Cleveland) =

Theater and performing arts school in Cleveland, Ohio

Coordinates: 41°29′58″N 81°41′52″W

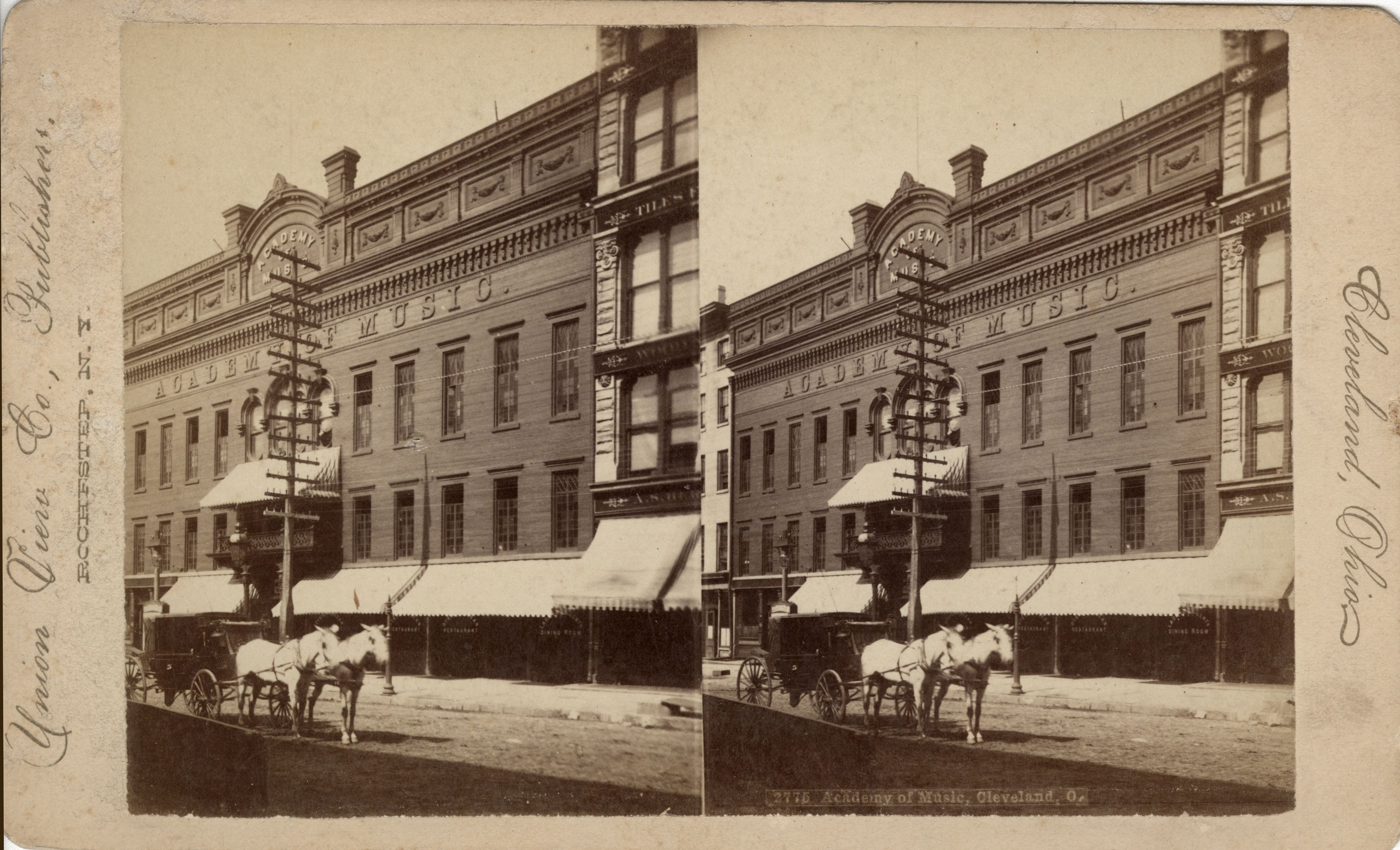
Academy of Music in c. 1882

The Academy of Music was both a theatre and a school for the performing arts in Cleveland, Ohio, United States, located at 1371 Bank St. (now West 6th St.) a bit north of Superior Avenue in the section of downtown now known as the Warehouse District. Built in 1852, it opened as National Hall in 1853. It operated with little success under the name Foster's Varieties when it was leased by the actor and playwright Charles Foster in 1854–1855. It was taken over by John A. Ellsler who transformed the venue into one of America's better theaters during the 1850s and 1860s. It operated as the Cleveland Theater from 1855 until 1859 when it was renamed the Academy of Music.

A successful dramatic school associated with the academy, one of the first in the United States, opened in 1854. The theatre declined in the 1870s as Cleveland's business demographics shifted. Ellsler led the theatre until he left to open the Euclid Avenue Opera House in 1875. It was briefly known as the Theater Comique in 1888 before once again being known as the Academy of Music. The theatre was active until 1889 when it was partially destroyed by fire. It was rebuilt and operated briefly as a venue for vaudeville until a second fire destroyed the theater in 1892.

== History ==
The Academy of Music (AM) was built in 1852. Originally called National Hall, it opened on January 25, 1853, with a dedication concert of opera excerpts given by the Cleveland Philharmonic Society under conductor F. Abel. The concert featured music from Bellini's La sonnambula, James Gaspard Maeder's The Peri or the Enchanted Fountain, Henry Bishop's Guy Mannering, Michael William Balfe's The Bohemian Girl, and several Rossini operas, including Mosè in Egitto, Il turco in Italia, Semiramide, and L'italiana in Algeri. The actor and playwright Charles Foster ran the AM for its first two years, under the name Foster's Varieties. Poor business results led him to lease the theatre to John A. Ellsler. Eisler turned the fortunes of the theatre around successfully after establishing Cleveland's first stock theatre company at the AM. Under Ellsler's tenure the theatre was known as the Cleveland Theater from 1855 until 1859 when it was renamed the Academy of Music.

The school portion of the AM opened on November 13, 1854, and was led by R. B. Wheeler and E. A. Payne. It was one of the earliest dramatic schools established in the United States. There were two classes for adults, beginners and advances, and one class for children. It met in a hall located at what was known as Hoffman's block. The school gained the reputation as one of America's top theatre schools during the 19th century. Actress Clara Morris began her career at the AM in c. 1860, and spent nine years training at the AM's school while performing at the theatre. Her work at the AM assisted her getting hired by Augustin Daly in 1870 which forwarded her career on the national stage. Actor Alban W. Purcell also began his career at the AM in 1863. Effie Ellsler and John McCullough also started their careers at the AM and its school.

Notable performers who appeared with some regularity at the AM in its early period included Edwin Booth, John Wilkes Booth (J. W .B.), and James O'Neill. Ellsler had a personal connection to the Booth family having first befriended John Wilkes in his boyhood while they were classmates in Baltimore, Maryland. They were also business partners in an oil company in Pennsylvania in the 1860s. J.W.B. first appeared at the AM in November and December 1863 in lead parts in Richard III, Othello, The Robbers (as Charles de Moor), Hamlet, The Lady of Lyons (as Claude Melnotte), and The Marble Heart. He was badly cut on the forehead while play-acting in a sword fight in the last act of Richard III, but nonetheless finished the play while bleeding profusely, to the thrill of the audience.

The development of businesses in Cleveland let the center of town to shift away from the area where the AM was located, and larger theaters opened in that part of the city leading to the decline of the AM's success. Eisler divested himself of his interests in AM and built the Euclid Avenue Opera House which opened in 1875. Around this time future theatrical producer A. L. Erlanger began his life in the theater selling opera glasses at the AM as a young man. After Mark Hanna purchased the AM, Erlanger became the theater's treasurer. Henry C. Miner's theatre troupe led by actress Carrie Swain played at the AM in April 1882.

In 1888 the AM was briefly renamed the Theater Comique. The AM was partly destroyed by fire on June 30, 1889, but was rebuilt only to be completely destroyed in a second fire on September 8, 1892. The rebuilt theatre of the 1889–1892 period was used as a vaudeville venue. It was not rebuilt after the 1892 fire.
