= Alban W. Purcell =

American actor

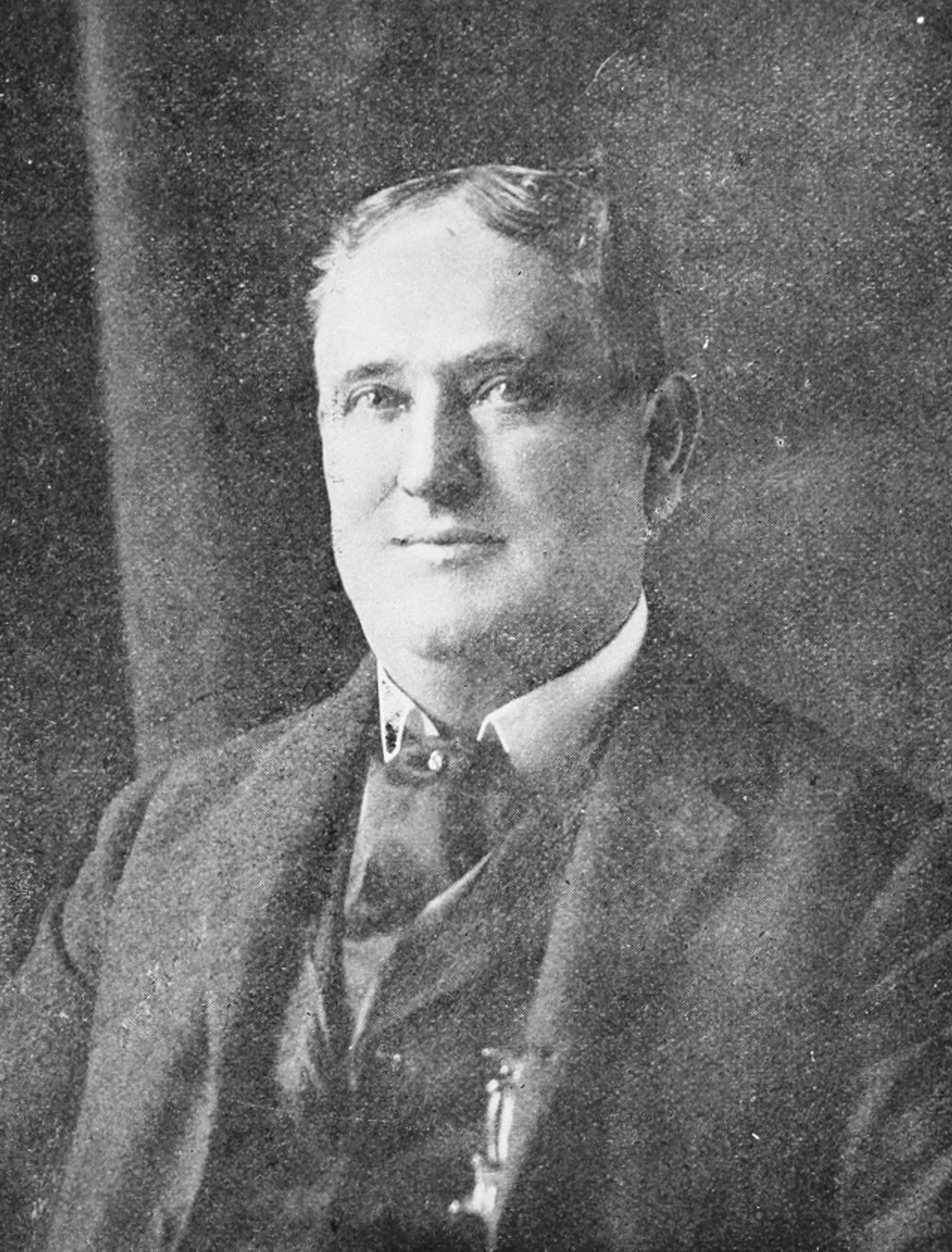
- Born: Alban Walter Purcell c. 1843; Wadsworth, Ohio
- Died: December 16, 1913 (aged 69–70); New York City, New York
- Other name: A. W. Purcell
- Occupations: Actor, Manager and Dramatist
- Spouse: Flora Meyers

Alban Walter Purcell (c. 1843 – December 16, 1913) was an American actor, dramatist and manager who briefly served in the American Civil War. Described as a very large man, Purcell played primarily supporting character roles over his forty-two year theatrical career.

== Biography ==
Alban Walter Purcell was born in Wadsworth, Ohio, in 1843 or 1844. In April 1861, while still a minor, he enlisted at Rochester, New York, with the 13th New York Volunteer Infantry. Purcell was discharged in late August of that year, about a month after seeing action at the First Battle of Bull Run in Northern Virginia.

His acting career began two years later in Cleveland, Ohio, at the Academy of Music under the direction of John A. Ellsler. In 1868 Purcell joined the cast of the Rochester Opera House then under the management of John C. Meyers. Not long afterwards he married Meyer's daughter, Flora, the company's lead actress. In subsequent years Purcell and his father-in-law would manage tours starring Edwin Adams, Edwin Forrest and Charles Barron. In 1870 Purcell and his wife toured the Southern United States as members of Laura Keene's company and the following season New England and Canada with a troupe he formed featuring Flora Purcell as its star.

Purcell was the author of a number of plays, including Manassas, a Civil War Drama, The Millerties and Bailey Neck. Over his career he appeared on stage with John Wilkes Booth, Barney and Maria Williams, Kate Batman, Sallie St. Clair, William and Malvina Florence, C.W. Couldock, Charlotte Thompson, Frank Chanfrau, Maggie Mitchell, Frank Mayo and Elizabeth Crocker Bowers. Early in her career Purcell joined Minnie Maddern's company and later as a member of the Castle Square Theatre received praise for his portrayal of Admiral Farragut and Secretary of the Navy Gideon Welles in productions of William Haworth's The Ensign that were staged in the late 1890s.

Declining health forced his retirement in 1905 and for a time Purcell lived on a farm he'd purchased in the Adirondack region of Upstate New York. Purcell died in New York City eight years later at around age 70. He was survived by two (James and Flora) of his four children.
