= Clara Morris =

Canadian/American stage actress (c.1846–1925)

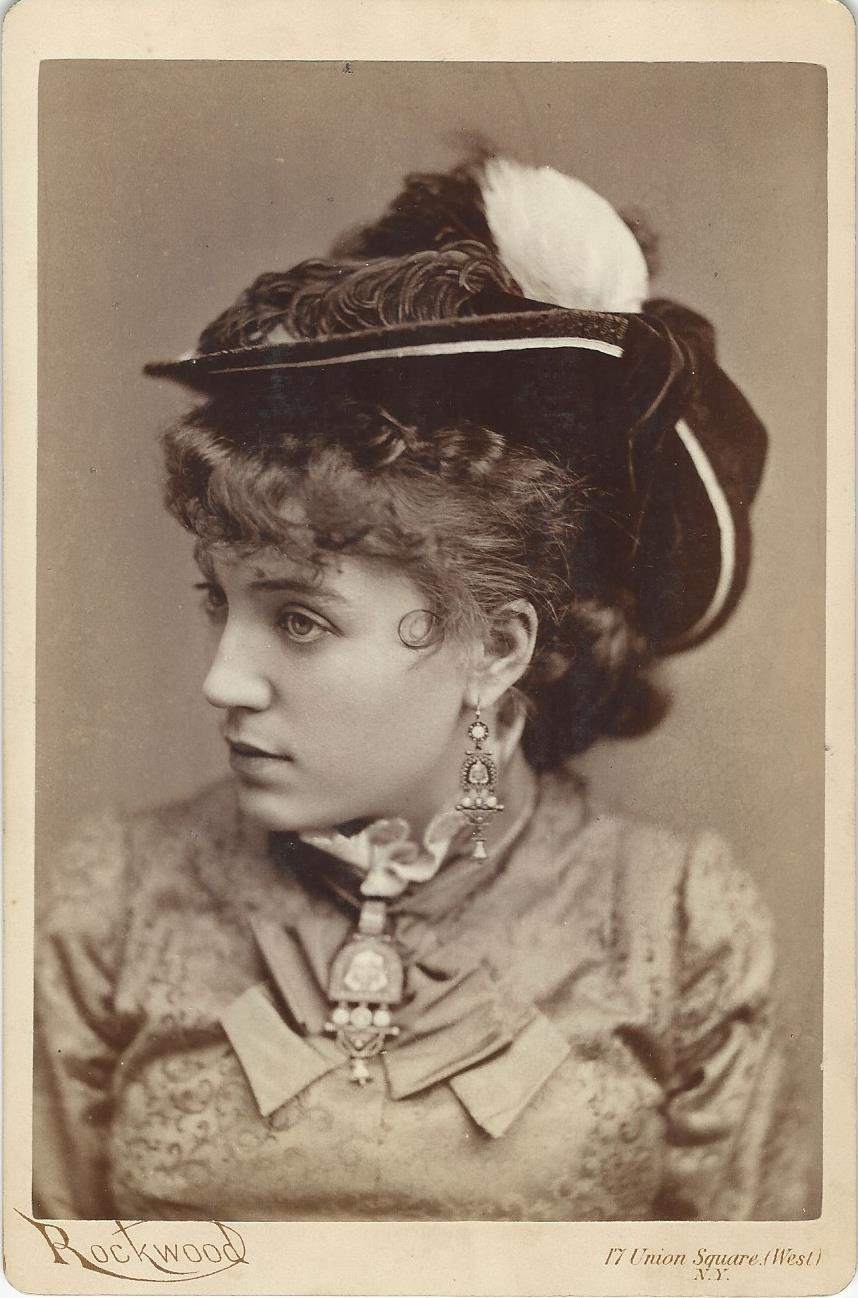
- Clara Morris by George G. Rockwood
- Born: Clara Morrison; 1846-1849 (disputed); Toronto, Canada West
- Died: November 20, 1925; New Canaan, Connecticut, United States
- Occupation: Actor
- Spouse: Frederick C. Harriott (m. 1874)

Clara Morris (1846-9 – November 20, 1925) was a Canadian/American stage actress of the Victorian Era.

== Early life ==
Actress Clara Morris was born in Toronto, the eldest child of a bigamous marriage. Sources disagree on the year of her birth, writing it as any of the years from 1846 – 1849, inclusive.

When she was three, her father, whose name was La Montagne, was exposed as a bigamist and her mother moved with Clara to Cleveland, where they adopted Clara's grandmother's name, Morrison. Young Clara received only scanty schooling. In circa 1860 she became a ballet girl in the resident company of the Cleveland Academy of Music, shortening her name to Morris at that time. At the Cleveland Academy of Music, Morris worked under the management of John A. Ellsler.

== Career ==
=== Stage ===
After nine years of training with that company she played a leading lady at Wood's Theatre in Cincinnati in 1869. She then appeared in Halifax, Nova Scotia for a summer, and with Joseph Jefferson in Louisville, before going to New York City in 1870. She made her New York debut in September in Man and Wife, directed by Augustin Daly at his Fifth Avenue Theatre. The role had come to her by chance, but she made such an impression in it that Daly starred her in a series of highly emotional roles over the next three years in such plays as No Name, Delmonico's, L'Article 47, Alixe, Jezebel, and Madeline Morel.

Mr. Daly engaged her to play in the Fifth Avenue Theatre, then located on West Twenty-fourth street; not as a leading act, but to fill whichever roles he deemed necessary. In the season of 1870–71, Man and Wife was in preparation for opening when the lead lady originally designated to play the role of Anne Silvester declined the part, and Ms. Morris stepped up to the position. On opening night, September 13, she made her debut in a major city, and ended up being recalled in an early scene in the play before the act was terminated - an unusual occurrence in the theatre at the time.

She left Daly in 1873 and in November of that year starred under A.M. Palmer's management in The Wicked World at the Union Square Theatre.

In 1872, she made a sensation in L'Article 47. Other successes followed and she became known as an actress distinguished for spontaneity and naturalness.

Over the next few years Morris secured many roles, playing parts in Camille in 1874, The New Leah in 1875, Miss Multon (an American version of a French version of "East Lynne", ultimately becoming her most popular role) in 1876, Jane Eyre in 1877, and The New Magdalen in 1882. She also toured extensively, especially in the 1880s, and amassed audiences with her emotional power. Although not trained in elocution or stagecraft, Morris was believed to have had a knack for portraying the impassioned and often suffering heroines of French melodrama.

The passing of the vogue for that sort of theatre, together with her uncertain health, brought her career to a close in the 1890s.

=== Writing and Speaking ===
In an article Morris wrote for the March 1904 issue of Metropolitan magazine, she recounted her encounter with Mark Twain. Morris included that the person who was intended to introduce her onstage had missed their train and couldn't attend the performance. Twain offered to introduce Morris instead, and the two walked to the stage, arm in arm. "Thus we made our entrance upon the stage," Morris wrote. "The applause was hearty and prolonged. I thought it was for him, and made no acknowledgment -- he thought it was for me and waited unresponsive. We looked reproachfully at each other -- then we both bowed. The audience understood and laughed happily."

In retirement in Riverdale, New York, she contributed articles on acting to various magazines, wrote a daily newspaper column for ten years, and published numerous books.

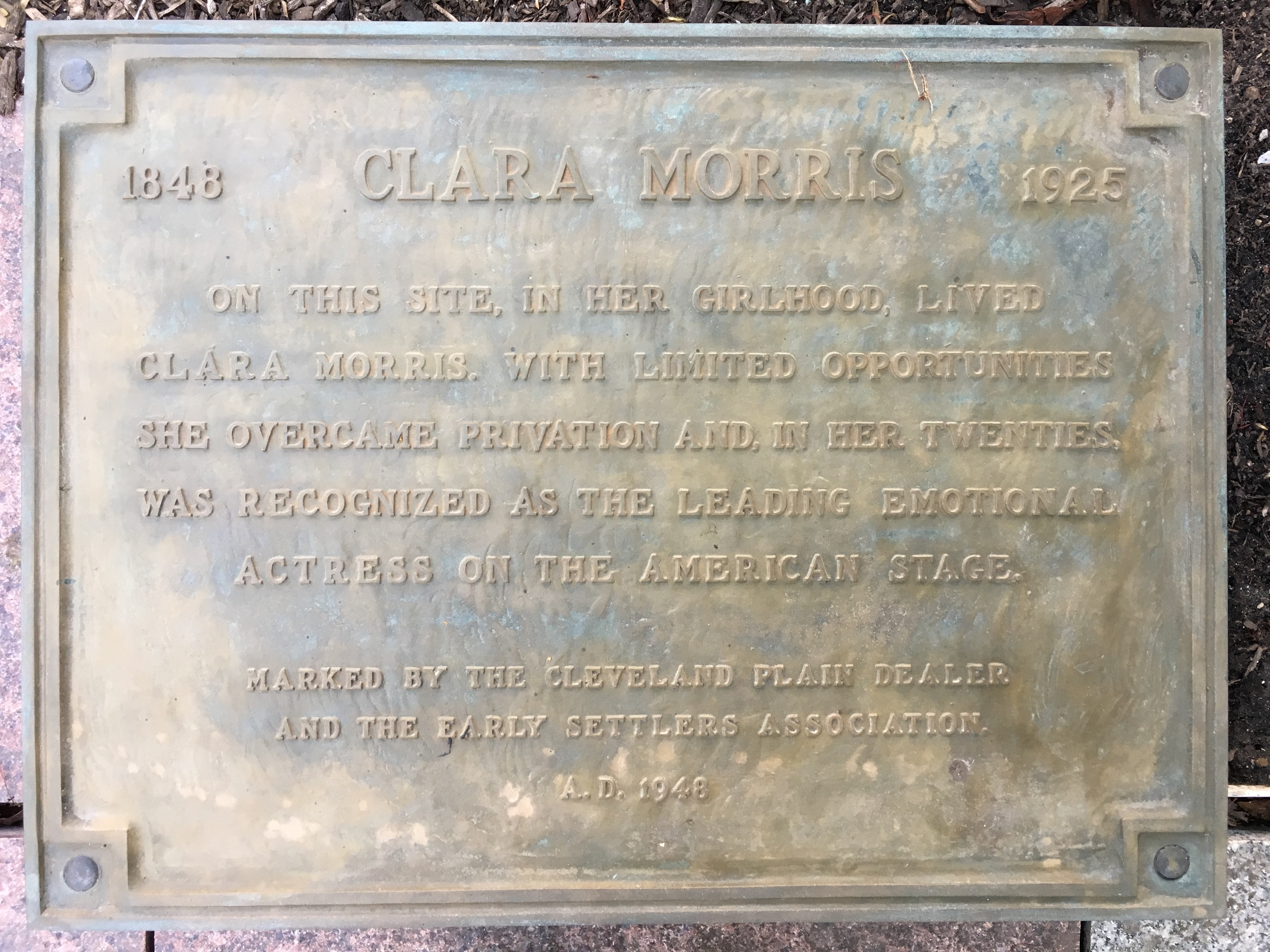
Plaque marking the location of Clara Morris' house on the grounds of Cleveland Public Library

== Personal life ==
She married Frederick C. Harriott on November 30, 1874; Morris supported Harriott until he started acting with her, in 1892.

== Later life and death ==
In 1910, Morris became blind, and experienced poverty. The house in which she had lived for 37 years was sold in 1914, and she moved to Whitestone, Long Island.

She died in New Canaan, Connecticut, on November 20, 1925, of a heart attack.

== Legacy ==
There is a plaque on the grounds of the Cleveland Public Library marking the location of Clara Morris' home when she was young. The plaque reads: "On this site, in her girlhood, lived Clara Morris. With limited opportunities she overcame privation and, in her twenties, was recognized as the leading emotional actress on the American stage."

The Clara Morris School, located at 1900 St. Clair Avenue NE, was part of the Cleveland Metropolitan School District until the building was torn down in 1968. Opened in 1868, the building was originally named the St. Clair School and held 16 rooms with "the windows, pointed in the Gothic manner."

== Roles ==
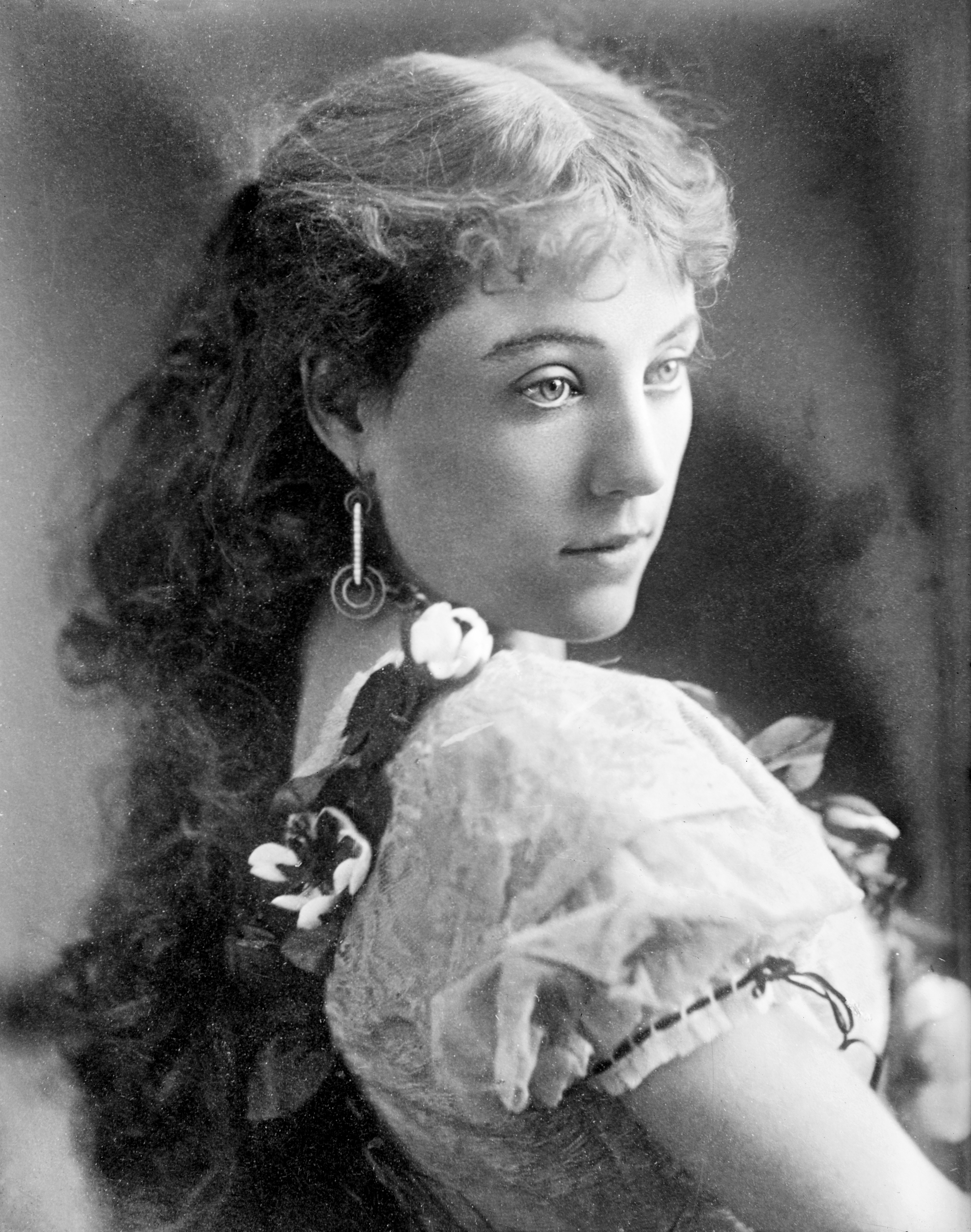
In the title role in Camille, 1874

Other notable roles of her career are:

- Anne Silvester in Man and Wife
- Lucy Carter in Saratoga
- Mme. D'Artigues in Jezebel
- Tilburnia in The Critic
- Magdalen Vanstone in No Name
- Constance Sherman in Delmonico's, or Larks Up the Hudson
- Miss Lulu Tibbetts in An Angel

== Works ==
For some years after 1885, she devoted herself mainly to literary work, writing:

- A Silent Singer (1899)
- Little Jim Crow, and Other Stories of Children (1900)
- Life on the Stage: My Personal Experiences and Recollections (1901)
- A Pasteboard Crown (1902)
- Stage Confidences (1902)
- The Trouble Woman (1904)
- The Life of a Star (1906)
- Left in Charge (1907)
- New East Lynne (1908)
- A Strange Surprise (1910)
- Dressing Room Receptions (1911)

In her book Life on the Stage: My Personal Experiences and Recollections she recounts her meeting with John Wilkes Booth the assassin of Abraham Lincoln.

== In culture ==
Barbara Wallace Grossman published A Spectacle of Suffering: Clara Morris on the American Stage in 2009, chronicling Morris' "importance as a feminist in the late nineteenth and early twentieth centuries."

Oscar Wilde, during his visit to America in 1882, saw her perform in The New Magdalen. "Miss Morris is the greatest actress I ever saw," he later wrote. "If it be fair to form an opinion of her from her rendition of this one role, we have no such powerfully intense actress in England. She is a great artist, in my sense of the word, because all she does, all she says, in the matter of the doing and of the saying constantly evoke the imagination to supplement it. That is what I mean by art. She is a veritable genius." See Roy Morris, Declaring His Genius - Oscar Wilde in North America The Belknap Press of Harvard University Press, Cambridge, Massachusetts and London, England, 2013. pp. 39–40. She was "perhaps the world's first method actor," notes author Morris.
