= Clara Fisher =

British actress

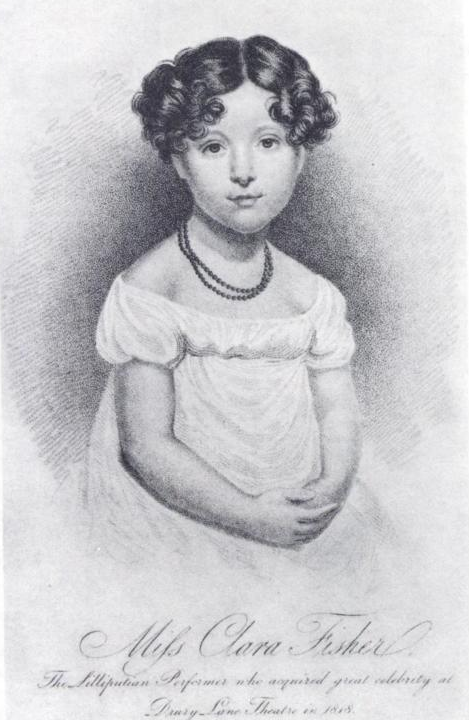
Clara Fisher aged six

Clara Fisher (14 July 1811 – 12 November 1898) was a British prodigy who, at the age of six, began performing on the London stage in 1817. Ten years later, she made her New York debut in 1827. Her acting career lasted for 72 years and in her later life she was commonly called "the oldest living actress".

== The British stage ==
Clara Fisher was born in London, England, on 14 July 1811. Her father was Frederick George Fisher, a librarian and well-known amateur actor. Her earliest memories were of attending concerts and plays with her family. When she was five years old, her father enrolled her in acting lessons. Her first performance was on 10 December 1817 at the Drury Lane Theatre as Lord Flimnap in the production of David Garrick's Lilliput, where she "astonished the audience with her great talent". After her success at Drury Lane, Clara moved on to successful engagements at Covent Garden.

By her teens, she had successfully performed Richard III, Shylock, Douglas, and Dr. Pangloss. She was hailed as Britain's "child wonder" and was regarded as the most successful child actor of her time.

She performed on the provincial theatre circuits, including the Stamford Circuit theatres at Newark and Grantham in December 1825.

== The American stage ==
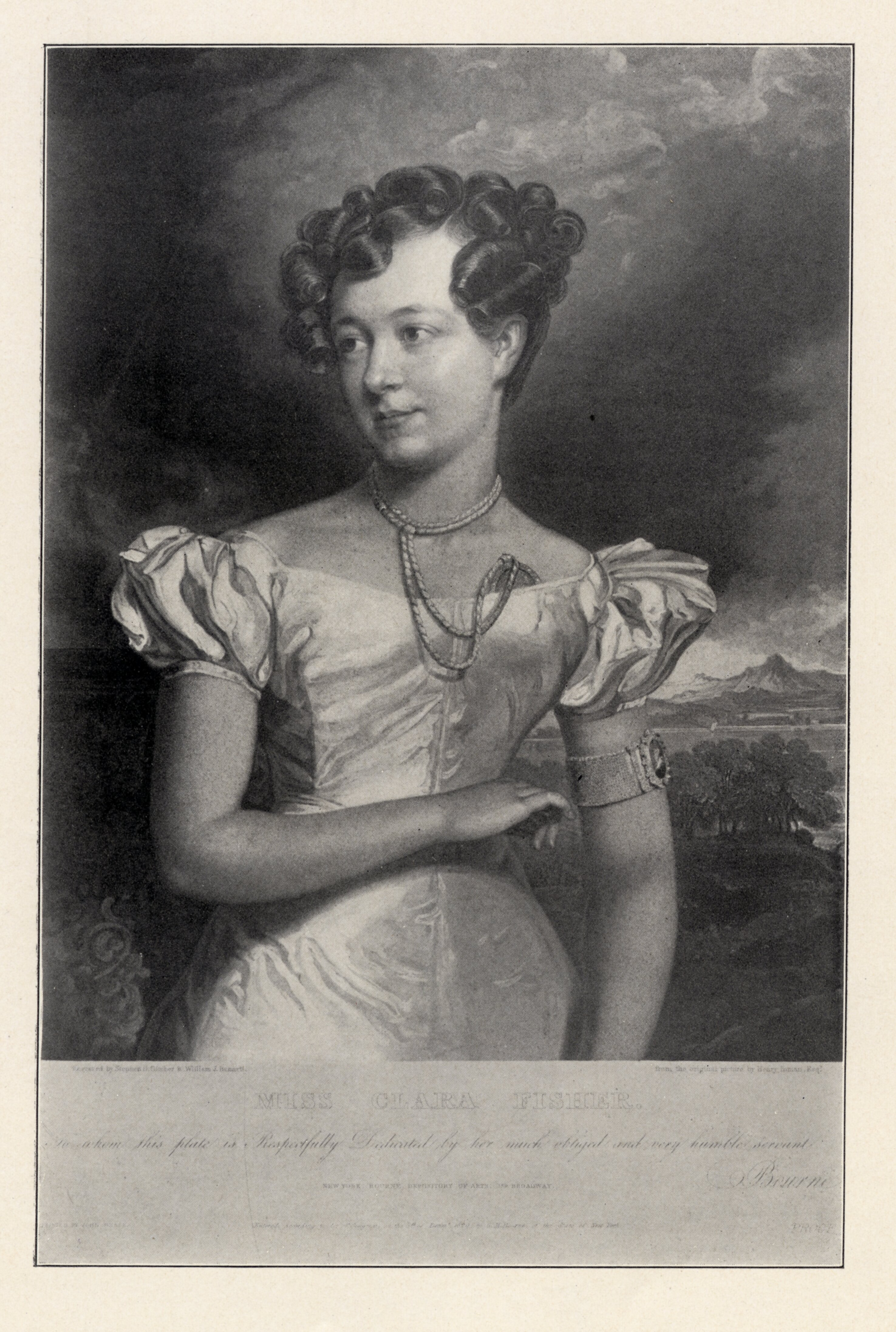
Portrait of Clara Fisher

In 1827, at the age of 16, Clara Fisher, along with her family, emigrated to the United States. She made her debut on the American stage at the Park Theatre to rave reviews. She was the "favorite Star" of every city where she performed. She "electrified" audiences with her portrayals of Ophelia, Viola, Cherubino and Susanna. She sparked a "Clara Fisher craze". Poems were written about her and her name was given to babies, hotels, stagecoaches, race horses, steamboats and almost anything else Americans could think of. Her plays were attended by the social and political elite of the time and she was painted by the miniature artist Rose Emma Drummond.

In December 1834, Fisher married James Gaspard Maeder (1809–1876), a composer and vocal coach, who wrote an opera for her entitled Peri, or the Enchanted Fountain. Together, they opened a theater in New Orleans and had seven children. Their son Frederick G. Maeder was a prolific playwright and an actor.

Fisher performed with most of the great actors of the time, including William Charles Macready, Edmund Kean, Edwin Booth (brother of John Wilkes Booth), John Brougham, Joseph Jefferson, Laura Keene and Edwin Forrest. Due to her immense popularity and success, she was able to earn a large fortune that allowed her to retire in 1844. Bad investments and extravagant tastes forced her to resume acting six years later.

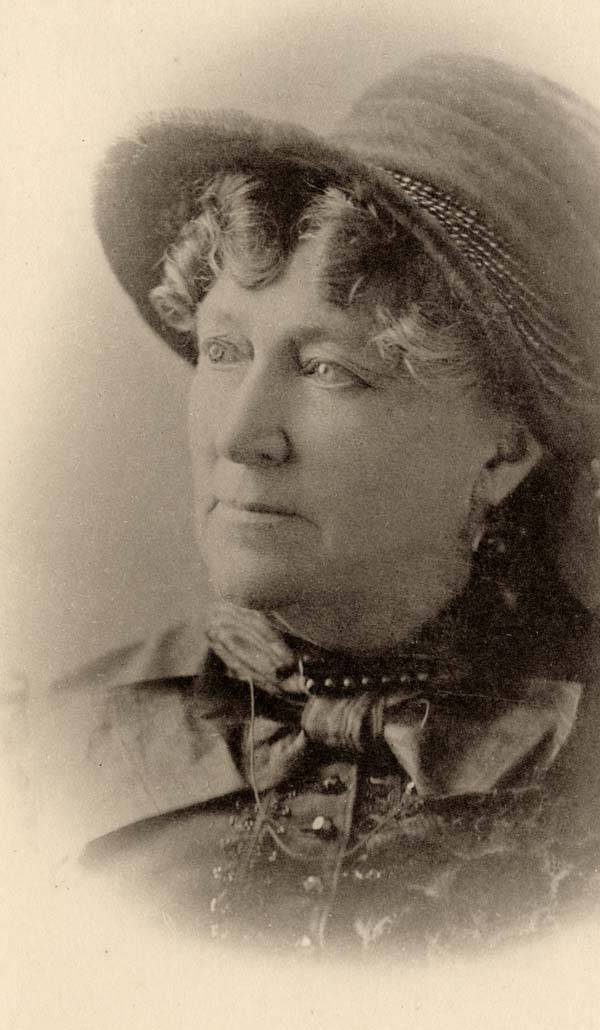
The actress in her later years

== Later years ==
Fisher continued to act from 1850 to 1888. Though her popularity declined and she was forced to play the roles of older women, she was still given respect for the strength of her dramatic work and was often referred to as "the oldest living actress". After her second retirement, she wrote her autobiography, which she finished in 1897.

Fisher died on 12 November 1898 at the home of her daughter in Metuchen, New Jersey, and is buried at the Woodlawn Cemetery in New York.
