= Laura Don =

American actress and playwright

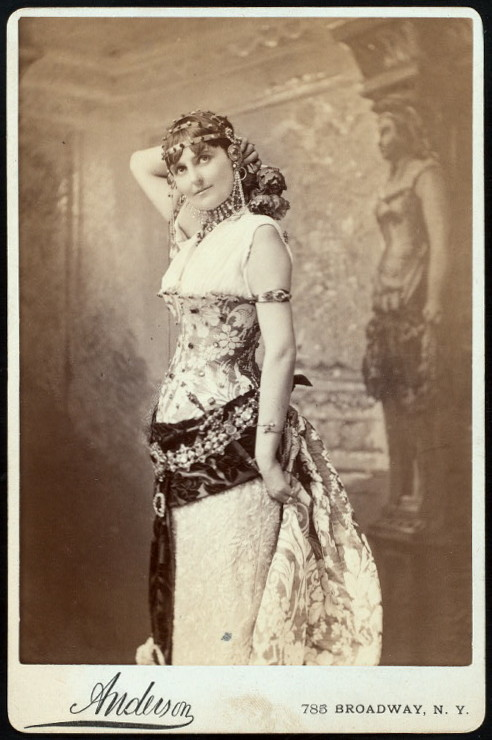
- New York Public Library Digital Gallery
- Born: Anna Laura Fish; February 20, 1852; Glens Falls, New York
- Died: February 10, 1886 (aged 33); Greenwich, New York
- Occupations: Actor-Manager, Artist and Playwright

Anna Laura Fish (February 20, 1852 – February 10, 1886), better known by the stage name Laura Don, was an American actress, stage manager, playwright and artist who died from tuberculosis while still in her early thirties. She wrote the play A Daughter of the Nile, that found its greatest success after her death, and was the mother of the writer Glen MacDonough (Babes in Toyland).

== Early life ==
Anna Laura Fish was born in Greenwich, New York, the daughter of Peter and Catherine (née Losee) Fish. Her father worked as a wheelwright and possibly had additional income that accounted for his family's comfortable circumstances. At an early age she submitted Gathering Pond Lilies for publication in Frank Leslie’s Ladies Magazine, the first of a number of her short stories to appear in Leslie's periodical over her life. She was an accomplished landscape and portrait artist with at least one of her paintings exhibited at the New York National Academy of Design selling for $150. In the late 1860s she married twice; first to George S. Fox, who operated a photography studio in Troy, New York. For a time she assisted him with his photography business before their marriage fell apart over her desire to pursue a career in theatre. She next married a theatrical agent named Thomas B. MacDonough, a union that in 1870 would produce their son Glen, born in Brooklyn, New York.

== Stage ==
Laura Don began her acting career with a traveling troupe performing in Brooklyn and later spent time with John Ellsler's company in Cleveland. By August 1875, (as Laura Don) she was playing Ophelia to E. L. Davenport's Hamlet at New York's Grand Opera House. At the same venue that September, she played Isabel, the principle female lead in The Pioneer Patriot: or the Dawn of Liberty with Harry Watkins and Joseph F. Wheelock and in July 1876 at Hooley’s Theatre in Brooklyn, the Spanish beauty, Donna Jovita Castro, in Bret Harte's Two Men of Sandy Bar. At Booth's Theatre in late 1878 she was Mary Meredith in Our American Cousin to George Parkes’ Lord Dundreary and Frank Hardenberg's Asa Trenchard, and the following January she appeared at The New Fifth Avenue Theatre in Dr. Clyde as Lady Hammond. On June 16, 1880, Don sailed for England aboard the Cunard liner S.S. Seythia with Frank Mayo's company and was back in New York by that September to assume the role Antonia in Archibald Clavering Gunter's Two Nights in Rome during the closing days of its run at Union Square Theatre. On February 7, 1881, Don began a two-month run as Erima in Fresh, the American and on November 28 of that year she starred in the American debut of George Robert Sims' My Mother-in-Law, both staged at Abbey's Park Theatre on 932 Broadway, New York.

Her play, A Daughter of the Nile, premiered on September 6, 1882, at the Standard Theatre in Manhattan with Don in the lead role of Egypt. A Daughter of the Nile is a melodrama that revolves around an American woman and her mysterious guise as an Egyptian. Some critics found the play lacking, others thought it creative and before its time. After a modest run in New York, Don took the play on the road with scheduled engagements at Montreal, Baltimore, Philadelphia, Chicago and Boston. Not too many years later, the actress Effie Ellsler would find success touring in Don's play that by then had been re-titled Egypt, or a Daughter of the Nile.

All Miss Don's versatility is called into play in A Daughter of the Nile. Her poetry and passion are seen in her creation of Egypt, her literary skill in the dialogue, her artistic instincts in the exquisite costumes. Right here I may say that Miss Don's eye for color is more correct than Oscar Wilde's; the lining of the cloak, as it is, is perfection, the bars of red are exactly what is wanted. Music and Drama, September 23, 1882

== Last years ==
Circa 1884, Don traveled to San Francisco to join the cast of Baldwin Theatre, then under the directorship of David Belasco. Soon, Belasco pictured Don in the role of Cleopatra and began working with her for an upcoming production. At times he found her difficult and moody, but when Belasco noticed traces of blood on her lips after she fainted during a rehearsal, he realized she was ill. Don later spent the better part of a year in Nice, France, in a vain attempt to regain her health. She eventually returned to her parents' home in Greenwich, New York, where she died on February 10, 1886. Before her death, Don had reportedly reconciled with George Fox, her first husband.
