= Leonard Grover =

American dramatist

Leonard Byron Grover (December 9, 1833 – March 7, 1926) was a nineteenth-century American comedic playwright, theatre manager, opera impresario, and sports promoter, best known for his association with President Abraham Lincoln.

His best known plays are Davy Crockett and Our Boarding House, believed to be the origin of the phase "make no mistake". Our Boarding House premiered to great success January 31, 1877, at the Park Theatre in Brooklyn, and was the launch of the comedy duo Stuart Robson and William H. Crane. His play Cad, the Tomboy was a big success for the actress Carrie Swain for whom he wrote that work.

== Biography ==
Grover was born in 1833 in Springwater, New York. Grover established his own touring company, the Grover German Opera Company, which presented Faust and Tannhäuser in New York and Philadelphia.

He also established Grover's Theatre in Washington, D.C., where President Abraham Lincoln frequently attended performances with his wife and Secretary of State William H. Seward. Grover was reported to have "saved Lincoln's life" outside the theatre; on one occasion after a performance, the president's carriage was surrounded by an angry mob and his driver was unable to move, and Grover jumped up, took the reins, and drove the president and his party to safety. He was told afterwards that the president felt he owed his life to Grover's quick thinking.

The president's son, Tad Lincoln, was attending a performance of Aladdin and the Wonderful Lamp at Grover's Theater on April 14, 1865, when his father was assassinated a few blocks away at Ford's Theatre.

In 1909, he wrote a lengthy piece for The Century Magazine titled "Lincoln's interest in the theater."

As a sports promoter, he organized the 1860 fight between English boxing champion Jem Mace and American John C. Heenan at 44 Union Square, as well as wrestling matches between Scotsman Donald Dinnie and New Yorker William Muldoon.

He died in Brooklyn, aged 92.

== Theatre invitations to Abraham Lincoln ==
Invitation to Hamlet
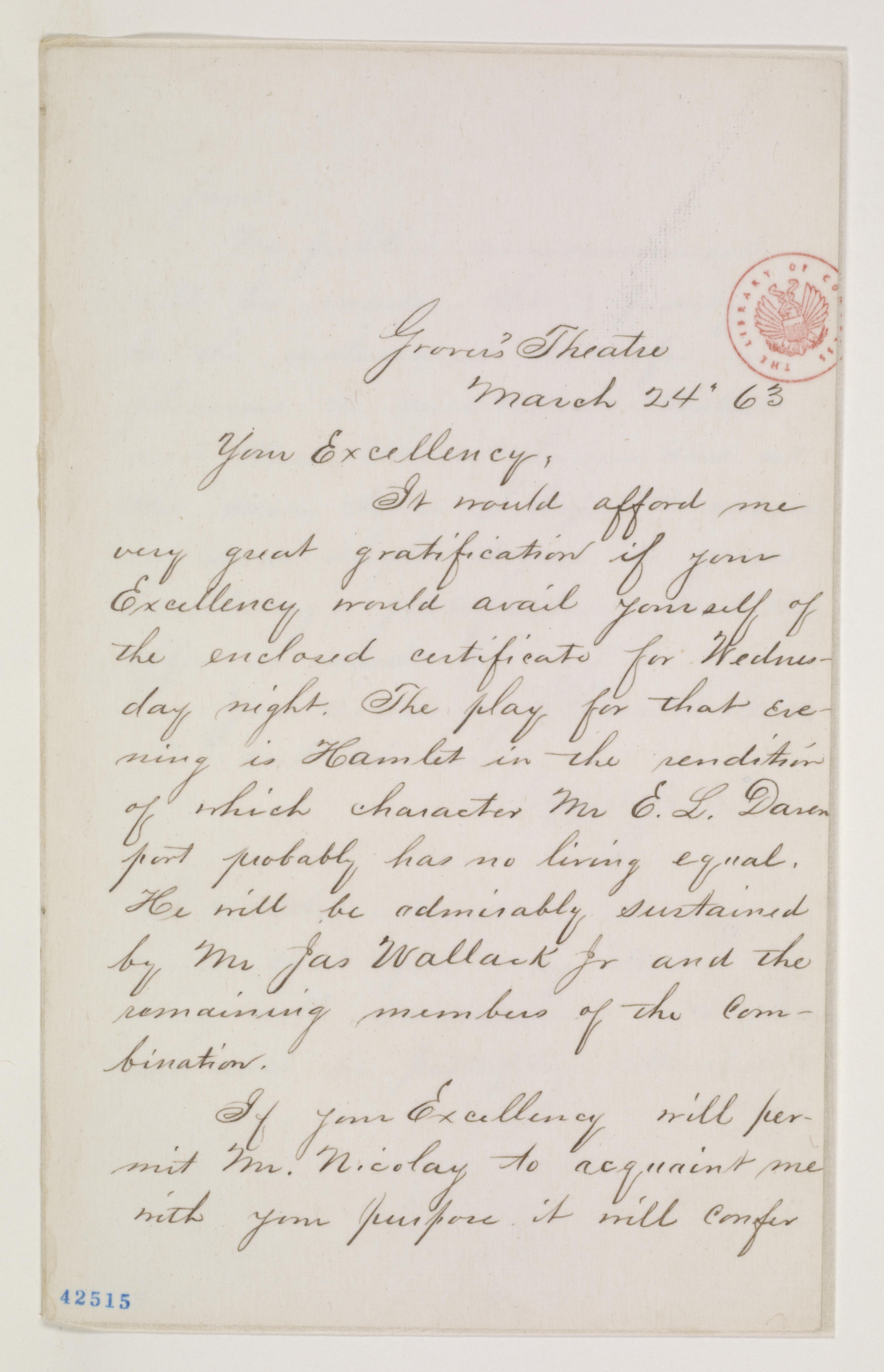
March 23, 1863, invitation to a performance of Hamlet at Grover's Theatre (front side)

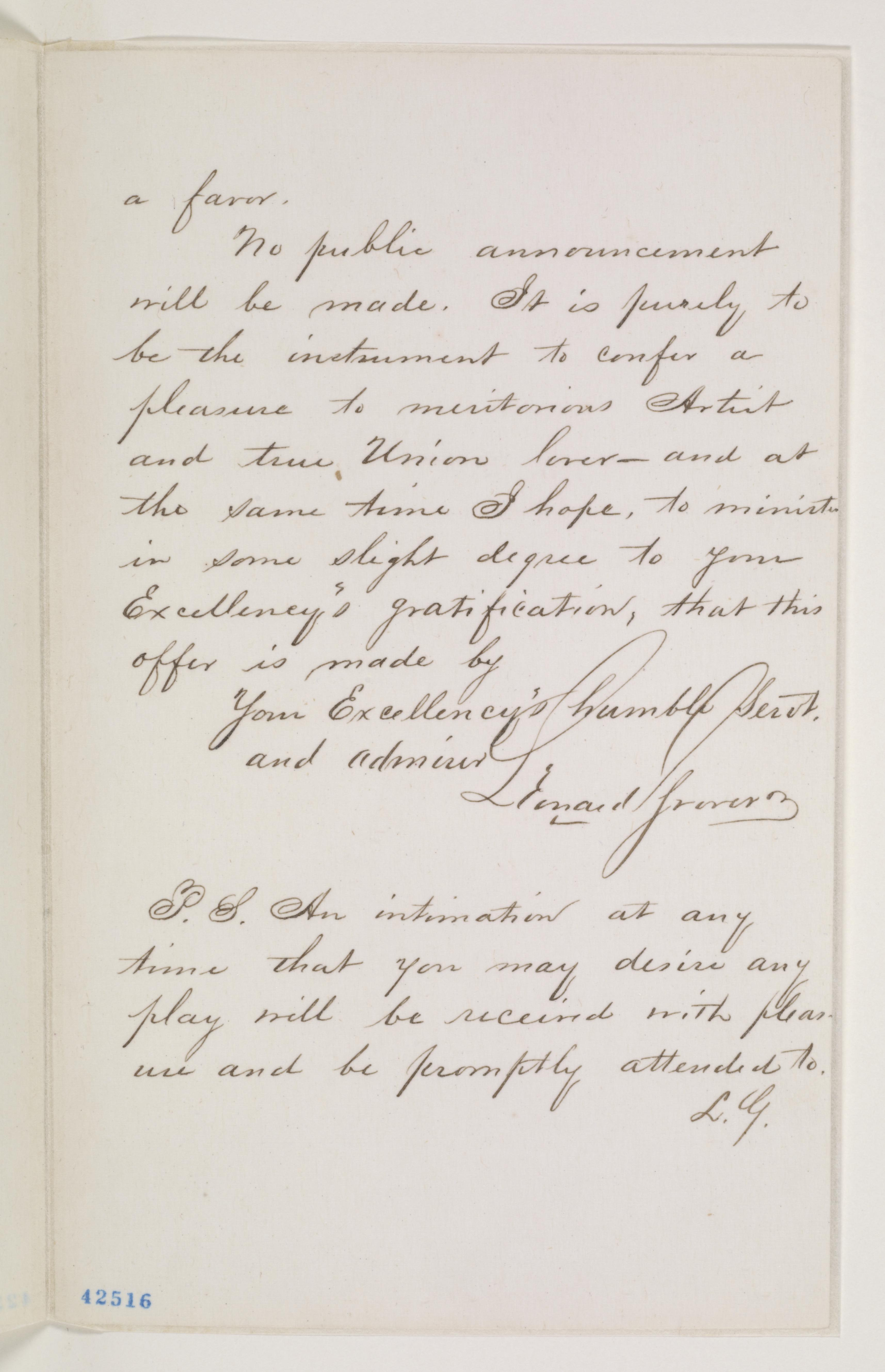
Invitation to Hamlet (back side)
Invitation to Othello
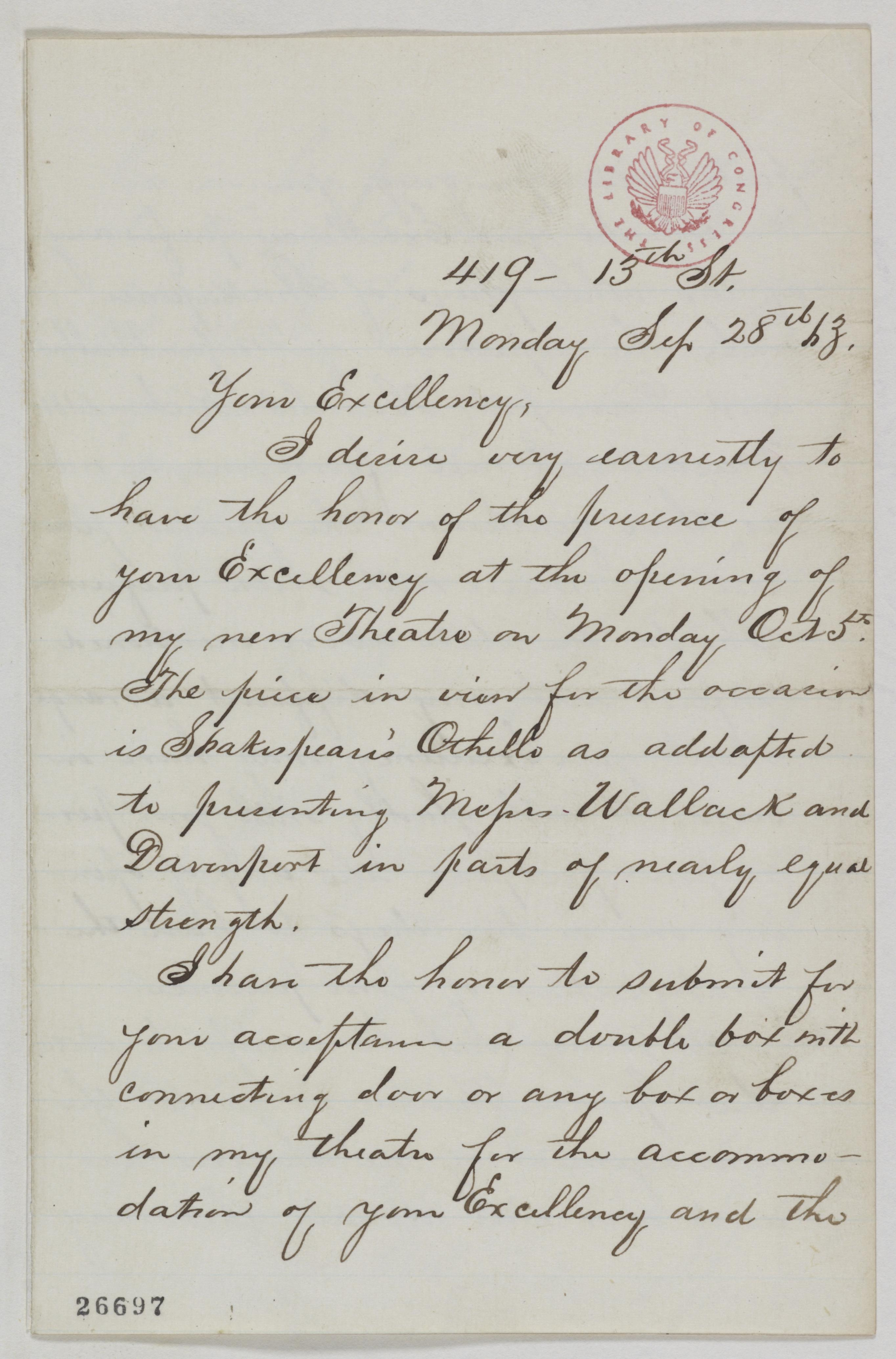
September 28, 1863, invitation to Othello (page 1)

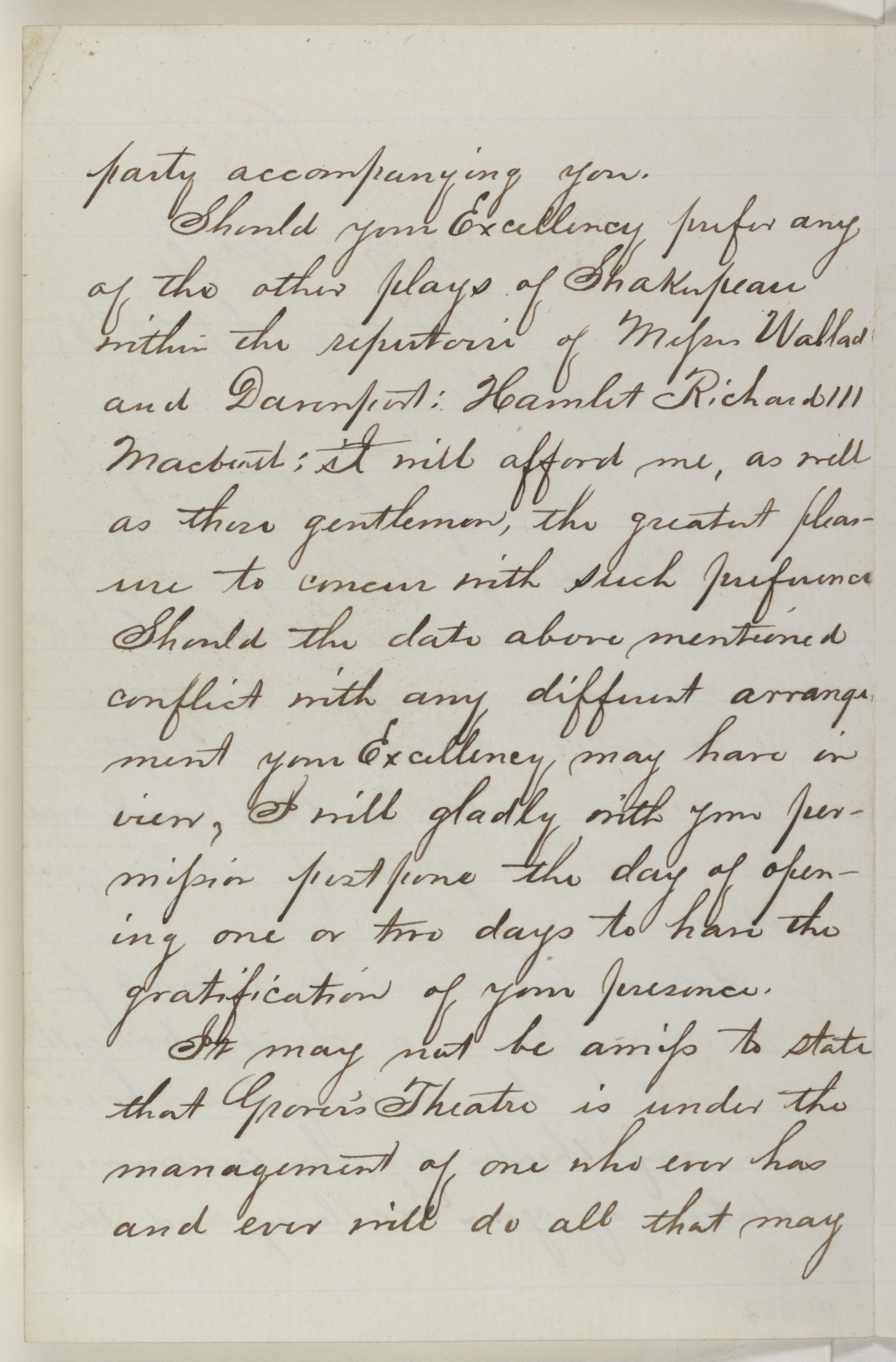
Invitation to Othello (page 2)

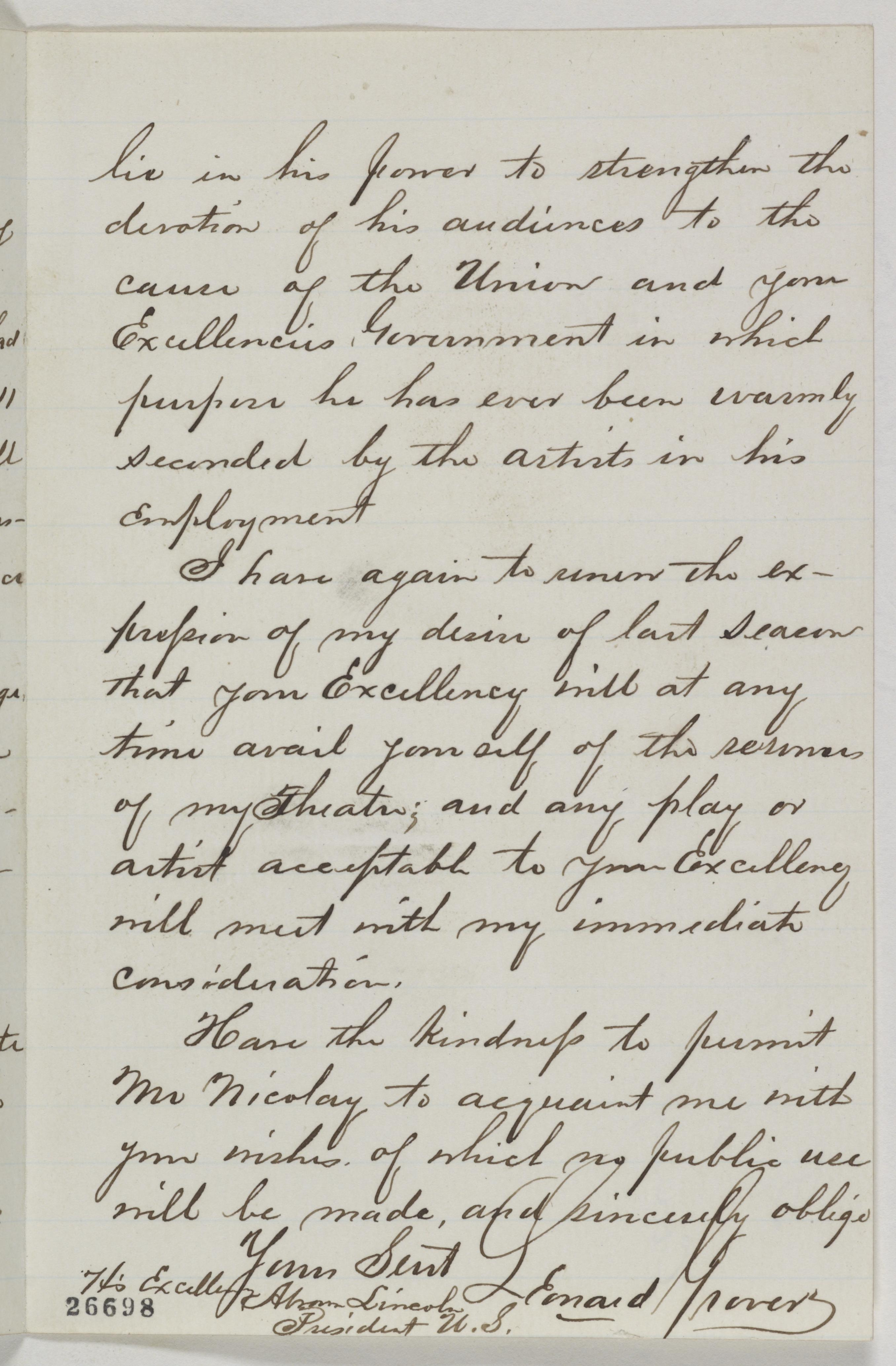
Invitation to Othello (page 3)
