= Frederick G. Maeder =

American playwright and actor (1840–1891)

Frederick George Maeder (1840 – 9 April 1891, New York City) was an American playwright and actor. Born in New York, he was the son of composer and vocal coach James Gaspard Maeder (1809–1876), whose works included Po-ca-hon-tas, or The Gentle Savage, and his wife, the actress Clara Fisher (1811–1898). He made his professional stage debut in 1859 in Portland, Maine portraying the officer Barnardo in William Shakespeare's Hamlet in a production managed by George Paunceford. As an actor he mainly performed comedic characters, often with an eccentric flair. He was best known during his lifetime as the writer of many plays; crafting works for numerous stage personalities of the second half of the 19th century. In addition to the many plays he wrote alone, he also co-wrote plays with McKee Rankin, among them Wife and Child, The Runaway Wife and The Canuck.

Maeder died of pneumonia at the age of 50 at the home of his brother Gaspard at 311 E 114th St New York, NY 10029.

== Partial list of plays ==
- Red Riding Hood; or Wolf's at the Door (1868)
- Help (1871)
- Lola (1871)
- Buffalo Bill (1872)
- Life's Peril; or, The Drunkard's Wife (1872)
- Nip, the Pretty Flower (1873)
- Mat, the Romp (1883, written for Carrie Swain)
- Morning Glory (1884, written for Carrie Swain)
- Wife and Child (1884, with McKee Rankin)
- Old London (1887, with McKee Rankin)
- The Runaway Wife (1888, with McKee Rankin; heavily revised version of Wife and Child)
- The Skirmish Line (1888, with McKee Rankin)
- The Canuck (1889, with McKee Rankin)
