= Effie Ellsler =

American actress

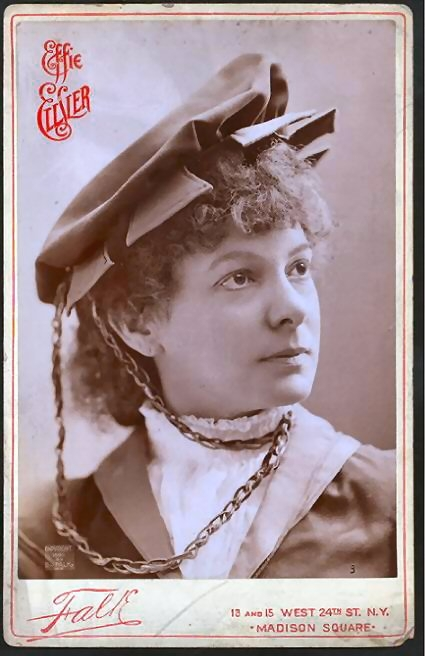
- Ellsler, c. 1890
- Born: Euphemia Ellsler; September 17, 1855; Philadelphia, Pennsylvania, U.S.
- Died: October 8, 1942 (aged 87); Los Angeles, California, U.S.
- Occupations: Stage and screen actress
- Spouse: Frank Weston (1881–1922)

Euphemia "Effie" Ellsler (September 17, 1855 – October 8, 1942) was an American actress of stage and screen whose career had its beginnings when she was a child and lasted well into the 1930s. She was best remembered over her early career for playing the title role in Steele MacKaye's hit play Hazel Kirke, and as the self-sacrificing Bessie Barton in Frank Harver's Woman Against Woman. Ellsler remained active during her later years appearing between 1901 and 1936 in at least six Broadway productions and twenty-two motion pictures.

== Early life ==
Euphemia "Effie" Ellsler was born in Philadelphia, Pennsylvania, the daughter of actors John and Euphemia "Effie" (née Murray) Ellsler. She first appeared on stage at the age of three in Cleveland, Ohio, at the Academy of Music; by then under the management of her father. Ellsler's first role was the Genie of the Ring in a production called, Aladdin; or, The Wonderful Lamp . At age four she was cast as Little Eva in an adaptation of Harriet Beecher Stowe's Uncle Tom's Cabin. As a young girl Ellsler often was asked to play juvenile roles with her father's stock company while attending school at the local Ursuline Convent and, with the aid of her mother, ballet dance classes.

It was during this period, and while still very young, she was called upon to do one of the apparitions in Macbeth. At the cue, she appeared behind the boiling caldron, when a flash of red fire startled her and caused her to forget her lines. Suddenly recovering her presence of mind, she thrust her hand into the bosom of her dress, drew forth a book of the play, and read the words. The Illustrated American, 1892

== Stage ==
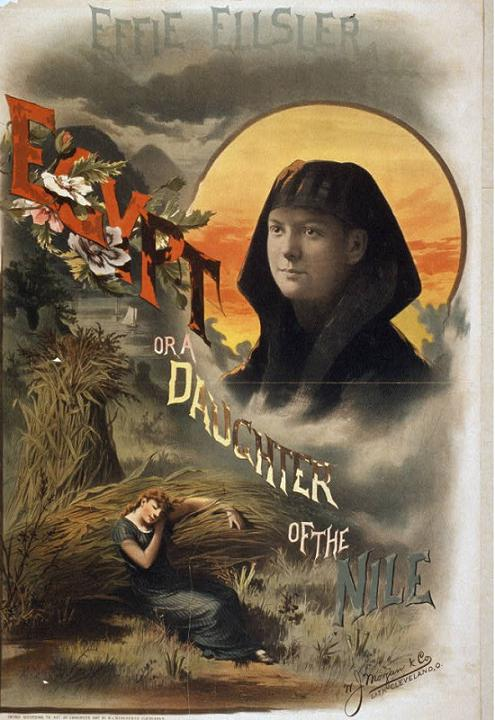
Egypt: or a Daughter of the Nile, 1890s

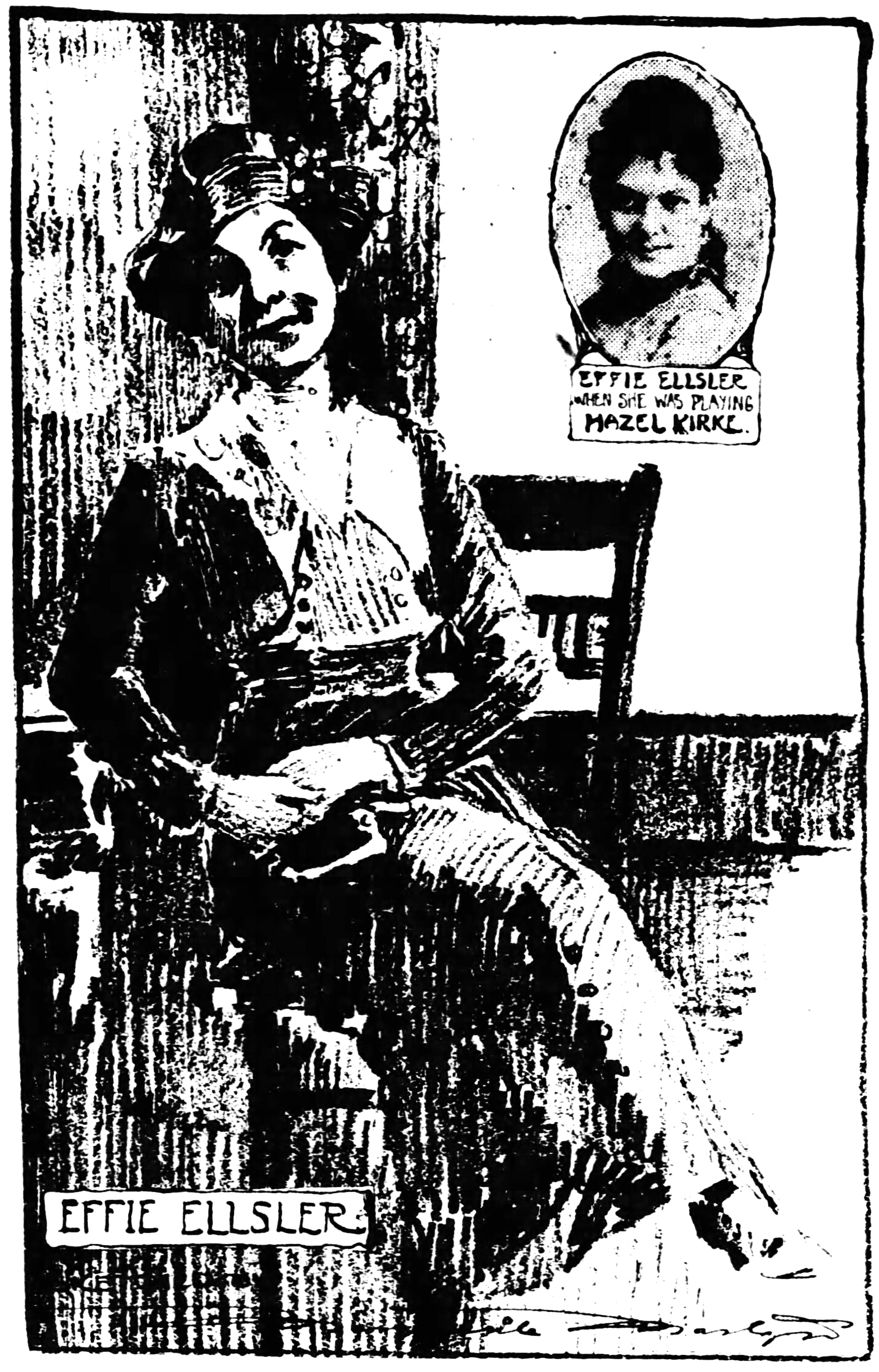
Sketch by Marguerite Martyn, 1919

At the age of sixteen Ellsler became a regular player with her father's company performing roles ranging from minor bit parts to a leading lady in Shakespearean plays. When she was about twenty-three Ellsler starred at her father's new Euclid Avenue Opera House in the original production of A Heroine in Rags, a comedy-drama written specifically for her by the playwright Bartley Campbell. Ellsler's big break came in 1880 when she created the title role in Hazel Kirke at the Madison Square Theatre, New York. She continued in the part, nearly without break, for three years and only stopped after her doctor advised her to do so.

On November 26, 1884, in New York, Ellsler opened as Priscilla Sefton at the Union Square Theatre in the American debut of Robert W. Buchanan's Storm Beaten and at the same venue two months later appeared as Mabel Blair in the premier production of Bartley Campbell's Separation. By late 1885 journalist Marcus Klaw had signed Ellsler to star in a national tour of the Frank Harver play, Woman Against Woman, a drama that tells the story of Bessie Barton and her sacrifice that saved the reputation of an ungrateful sister. With A. L. Erlanger as the company's advance man Woman Against Woman with Ellsler toured successfully for three seasons. Over the following decades plays of note that Ellsler starred in, either in New York or on the road, would include Camille from the novel by Alexandre Dumas, fils, Clinton Stuart's The Keepsake, Judge Not by Frank Hervey, Laura Don's Egypt: or a Daughter of the Nile and as Julia Marlowe's replacement in Barbara Frietchie by Clyde Fitch.

Ellsler last appeared on the Broadway stage at the Morosco Theatre in September 1922 after a two-year run in The Bat, a three-act mystery melodrama by Mary Roberts Rinehart and Avery Hopwood. Two nights before the play's finale, Ellsler collapsed during her performance, but against advice, insisted on returning for the play's last two engagements.

== Film ==
Ellsler made her film debut in Old Ironsides (1926), playing Esther Ralston's mother. Over a ten-year span she appeared in at least 22 pictures, including The Front Page (1931) as Mary Brian's mother, Daddy Long Legs (1931) in the role of Mrs. Semple, Black Fury (1935) playing Bubitschka, and the Western Drift Fence (1936) as Granny Dunn. She retired after playing Grandma Duval in the Greta Garbo film version of Dumas' Camille (1936).

== Marriage ==
Ellsler married fellow actor Frank Weston on May 25, 1881, in Chicago. Weston was a respected actor who had played opposite Edwin Booth, Edward Loomis Davenport and Lawrence Barrett, and had been a leading actor at Mcvicker's Theatre in Chicago and with John Ellsler's company in Cleveland. Later Weston and Effie Ellsler would form their own stock company active over the latter years of the nineteenth century. Weston, who as a boy served in the American Civil War, died at the age of 70 on January 27, 1922, from pneumonia after a three days illness. Ellsler received the news of her husband's death while she was appearing in The Bat and chose to go on with the next performance because the company lacked an understudy for her part.

== Later life ==
Ellsler was for a number of years a resident of Nutley, New Jersey, until the death of her sister Addie (Annie) in 1938. She then relocated to Los Angeles, where she died after a short illness on October 8, 1942. Her other siblings were John J. (died 1925) and William Cary (died 1936). Her nephew was John Park Ellsler (1882–1940), son of her brother, John J. Ellsler.
