= Caryl Florio =

American composer

William James Robjohn, better known by the pseudonym Caryl Florio, (2 November 1843 – 21 November 1920) was an English-born American composer, pianist, organist, conductor, music critic, and actor.

== Life and career ==
William James Robjohn was born on 2 November 1843 in Tavistock, Devon. He left England with his family for the United States, arriving in New York City at the age of 14. He was a boy soloist at Trinity Church in Manhattan as a teenager.

After working as church choir director and organist at several different churches, Robjohn took up a career on the stage as an actor in 1862; touring the northern part of the United States for a six-year period. In 1868 he returned to New York City where he was active as music critic, music teacher, pianist, and conductor. In 1870 he adopted the name Caryl Florio in response to his family's objections to his career choice. His the music textbook A Textbook of Practical Harmony was published by the London music publishers Morgan & Scott in 1892.

In 1896 Florio left New York City for Asheville, North Carolina to take a position as organist at the newly built Cathedral of All Souls; a church established by George Washington Vanderbilt II. He remained in that position through 1901, and was afterwards active as a music teacher and choir conductor in Asheville. He died in Morganton, North Carolina on 21 November 1920.
