= John A. Ellsler =

American actor

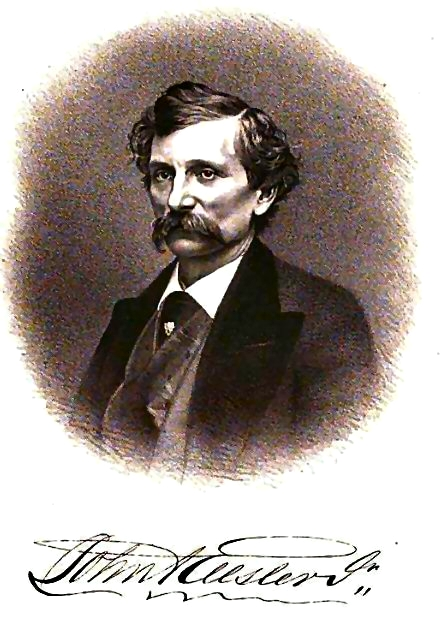
- Ohio, The Future Great State, 1875
- Born: John Adam Ellsler Jr. September 21, 1821; Harrisburg, Pennsylvania
- Died: August 22, 1903 (aged 81); New York City
- Occupations: Actor, Theatre Manager and Acting Instructor
- Children: Effie Ellsler

John A. Ellsler (September 21, 1821 – August 22, 1903) was an American actor, theatre manager and acting instructor who helped make Cleveland, Ohio one of the more important theatre towns in post Civil War America. Ellsler was instrumental in starting the careers of several well known actors of that period including his daughter's.

== Early life and career ==
John Adam Ellsler Jr. was born in Harrisburg, Pennsylvania and later moved with his family to Baltimore, Maryland. He first became acquainted with the theatre as a delivery boy for a firm that printed theatrical programs and posters. He later returned to Philadelphia where by 1846 Ellsler was employed as assistant treasurer, property man and bit player at Peale's Museum. The next year he joined William E. Burton's company at the Arch Street Opera House. In 1849 he was one of the seven founding board members of the Actors' Order of Friendship, a benevolent society established in Philadelphia. After three seasons with William E. Burton's company he moved on to New York City to play leading roles at Chatham Theatre. After an engagement at Charleston,. South Carolina, Ellsler became co- manager with Joseph Jefferson on a two-year road tour of the Southern American States. For two seasons in the early 1850s Ellsler managed the Utica Museum, Utica, New York.

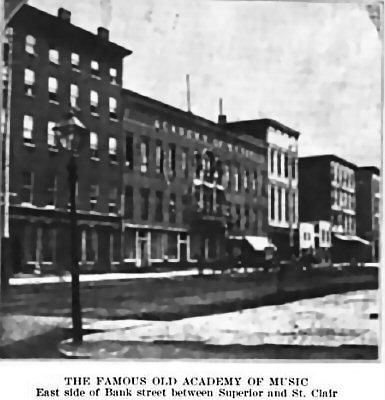
Academy of Music, Cleveland c.1875

== Academy of Music ==
Ellsler came to Cleveland in 1853 where his management saved the Cleveland Theatre (later known as the Academy of Music) from bankruptcy. In 1858 he began a two year tenure as manager of Woods's Theater, Cincinnati before returning to the Cleveland where over the following two decades he turned the Academy of Music into one of the more prestigious theatres and acting schools in America. At one time or another nearly every major actor of that period appeared at the Academy of Music, including Clara Morris, “Jimmie” Lewis, Joseph Whiting, Joseph Haworth, James O'Neill, Roland Reed and daughter Effie Ellsler, actors who had received their early training there. John Edward McCullough, Laura Don and Lawrence Barrett were relative unknowns before joining Ellsler’s company in the early 1870s.

== Dramatic Oil Company ==
In late 1863 Ellsler joined in a partnership with John Wilkes Booth, whom he’d known since his early days in Baltimore, and Thomas Mears, a mutual acquaintance. The three formed the Dramatic Oil Company and the following year purchased a plot of land in the township of Cranberry, Pennsylvania and began drilling for oil. Soon the operation proved more costly than they had anticipated and after an ill-advised attempt to increase production the well was destroyed when they employed an excessive amount of explosives (shot). The Dramatic Oil Company collapsed and the partners soon went their separate ways.

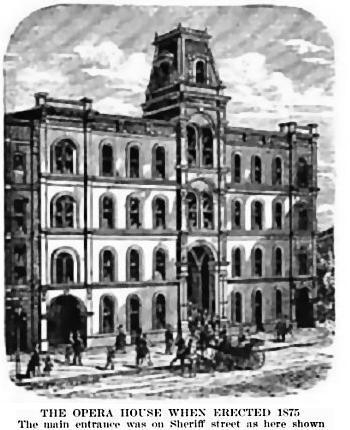
Euclid Avenue Opera House, Cleveland c. 1875

== Euclid Avenue Opera House ==
In 1873 Ellsler began construction in Cleveland of a new $200,000 grand theatre on Sheriff Street near Euclid Avenue that became known as the Euclid Avenue Opera House. He ignored advice that the site was too far from Cleveland’s business district and in 1875 moved his stock company to the new theatre and turned the Academy of Music into a vaudeville house. After a spectacular opening the theatre struggled, in part from its location, but also from a general economic malaise at the time. By January, 1878 Ellsler had sold his interest in the venue and returned his theatrical operation back to the Academy of Music where he remained until the mid-1880s.

== Personal life ==
During his time with the Chatham Street Theatre, Ellsler married the actress Euphemia Murray (November 21, 1823 – December 12, 1918), a native of Philadelphia. Murray had begun as a child actress and, after the death of her first husband, made her adult debut at the Chatham as Pauline in The Lady of Lyons. She remained active on stage with her husband after they married and by the time of her death, at the age of ninety-five, she was considered possibly the oldest former actress in America. Their daughter Effie would later become a well-known stage and film actress. The Ellslers’ children, John J., William C., Addie(Annie) and Effie, all lived to survive their parents. The family lived for a time in the George Merwin House in Cleveland, currently occupied by The Rowfant Club.

== Later life ==
In 1885 Ellsler sold his interest in the Academy of Music and the following year moved with his wife to New York City. There, for a few seasons before retiring, he acted in supporting roles opposite his daughter. Ellsler died at his New York residence on the morning of August 22, 1903, a victim of heart disease. He was later interred at Cleveland’s Lake View Cemetery following a service at Wade Memorial Chapel that was attended by hundreds.
