= Foresters Music Hall =

Music hall in Bethnal Green, London

Coordinates: 51°31′20″N 0°3′20″W

Foresters Music Hall, also known as The Artichoke Music Hall, Royal Foresters Music Hall, New Lyric Music Hall, and New Lyric Theatre, was a music hall and later cinema located at 93 Cambridge Heath Road in Bethnal Green, London, United Kingdom. It was active as a theatre for live performances from 1850 until 1912 when it was converted into a cinema. One of London's first cinemas, it operated until closing its doors in 1917. It re-opened as Foresters Super Cinema in 1925. It showed films until it closed in 1960. The building was demolished in 1964.

== History ==
Foresters Music Hall was originally known as The Artichoke Music Hall. It was established in 1850 as an expansion to The Artichoke public house (built c. 1825) which obtained a licence that year for music and dancing. It was a moderately successful venue during its early history. The hall later became one of the London's more important music halls under the proprietorship of William Lusby, who acquired it in 1890.

In 1891 the venue underwent significant reconstruction and renovation, and expanded into the original interior of the c. 1825 structure. It re-opened that year as Foresters Music Hall (FMH). Lusby was assisted in running the FMH at the height of its success by G. H. MacDermott and W. H. Pannell from 1890 through 1904. In the last three years of its tenure under Lusby it was known as Royal Foresters Music Hall, but the Royal was subsequently dropped again from the name.

Frank Macnaghten of the Macnaghten Vaudeville Circuit acquired the FMH in 1906. Under his leadership the venue had one show a week in which aspiring performers could play before an audience, an event which discovered many performers in the outset of their careers. The audience was particularly critical of these performances, and some future stars, such as Charlie Chaplin, failed miserably in their attempts to win approval: Chaplin was booed and heckled with thrown oranges and coins until he left the stage.

Macnaghten installed equipment to play silent films in the venue in 1906. These were originally used to enhance the live variety theatre entertainments in the hall. The theatre obtained a licence as a cinema six years later, and was one of the first movie theatres in London. It was principally a cinema from 1912 until closing its doors in 1917. It was known as first the New Lyric Music Hall and later the New Lyric Theatre in 1916–1917.

In 1925 it re-opened as a movie theatre called Foresters Super Cinema and in 1936 it became a part of Odeon Cinemas. It was structurally damaged during The Blitz in World War II. It was repaired and a grand re-opening was done on 10 October 1949. It continued to operate until giving a final showing on 20 August 1960. It was demolished in 1964.
