= Academy of Music (Chicago) =

Theaters in Chicago, Illinois

Coordinates: 41.88115°N 87.64755°W

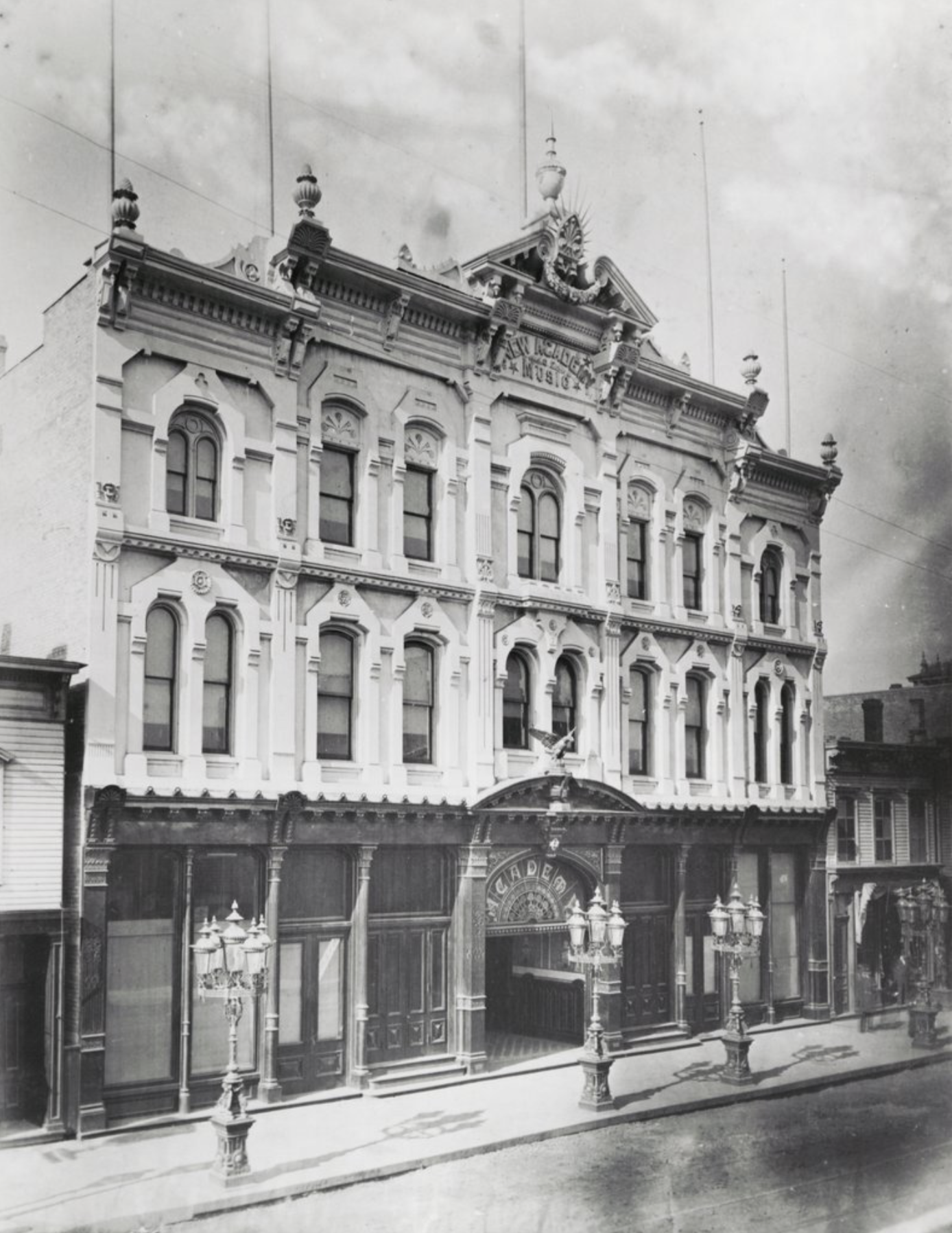
Second Academy of Music in c. 1878-1879

The Academy of Music was the name of three theaters in Chicago, Illinois. The first two theaters were located at 83. S. Halsted Street in West Side, Chicago near the intersection of Madison Street and Halstead. They were both destroyed by fire. The first theatre opened in 1872, and after it was destroyed in 1878 the second theatre was quickly built on the same property and opened the same year as the first fire. The second theatre was destroyed by fire in 1880.

The third Academy of Music was located at 16 Halsted Street. It opened in 1880 and operated as a legitimate theatre for thirty-five years. In 1915 it became a movie theatre, and continued to operate in that capacity until it closed in 1934. It was demolished in 1936.

== First Academy of Music (1872-1878) ==
The construction of the first Academy of Music was spearheaded by Chicago theatre manager Charles R. Gardiner in 1871. Gardiner was the manager of the Academy of Music, and was a powerful booking agent not only in the city of Chicago but on the national stage during the 1870s and 1880s. Through his talent agency, The Managers' and Stars' Agency he had the ability to control booking routes across the country as well as negotiate contracts between theaters and performers. The theatre was built just after the Great Chicago Fire of October 1871 destroyed many of the city's entertainment venues, and it was the first theatre built in the city after the great fire. It was constructed in just 35 days in November–December 1871.

The Academy of Music was designed by architect Stephen Vaughn Shipman (1825–1905). The building stood 60 feet high and was 120 feet long and 52 feet wide, and the stage was 25 ft by 35 ft. It was built by Bushnell & Co. The theatre had a seating capacity of 1200 people. Its inaugural performance occurred on January 10, 1872. It opened with a production of T. W. Robertson's comedy Ours with a cast led by the actor Charles Wyndham.

The Academy of Music was destroyed by fire on February 5, 1878.

== Second Academy of Music (1878-1880) ==
The building of the second Academy of Music was done at the behest of W. B. Clapp who owned the property on Halsted Street. The second theatre was designed by architect Oscar Cobb (1842–1908). Built at that same location as the first theatre, it opened on September 16, 1878. Short lived, the second theatre was destroyed by fire on October 12, 1880.

== Third Academy of Music (1882-1936) ==
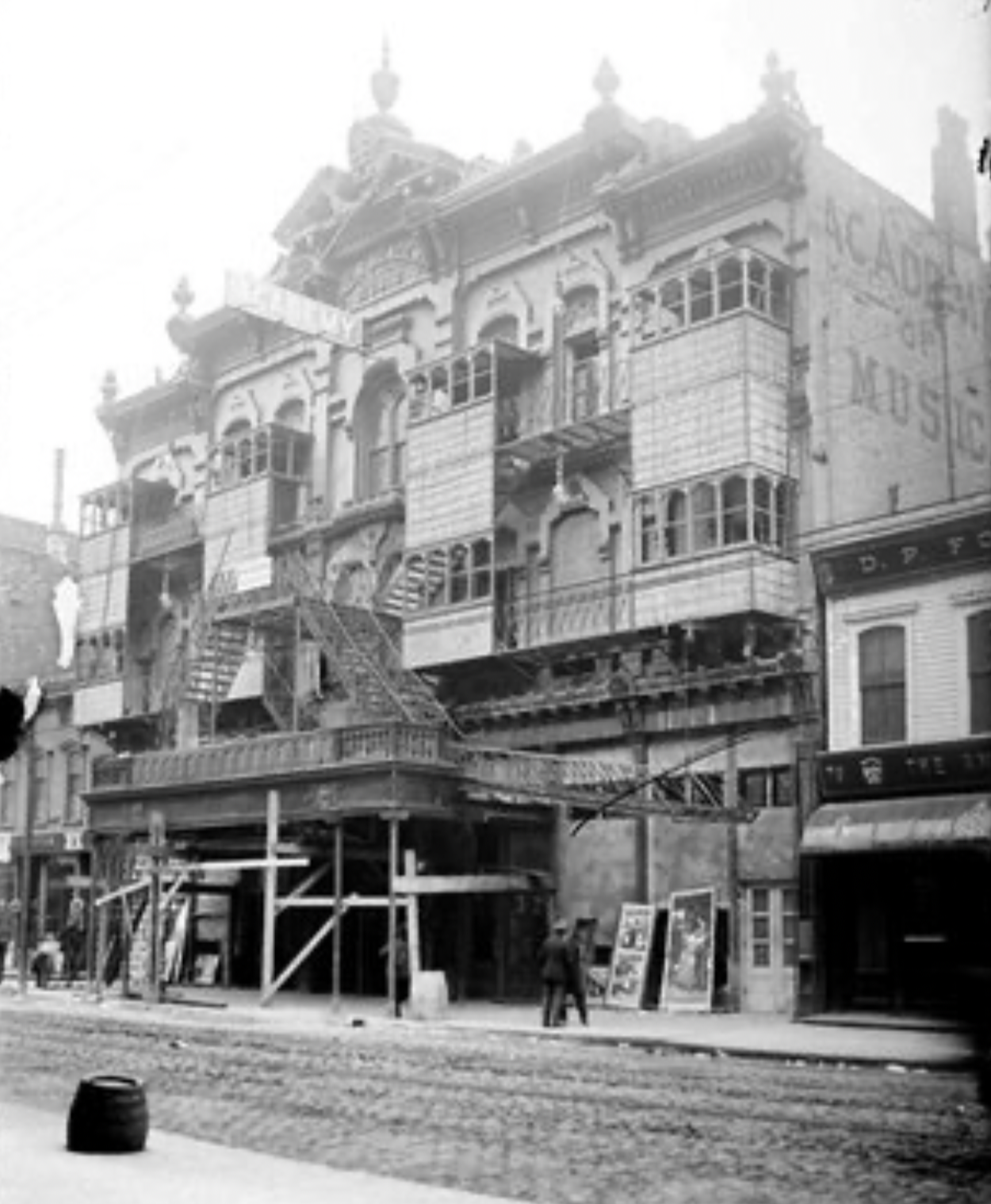
Facade of the Academy of Music in Chicago in 1905.

The third Academy of Music, also known as Shelby's Academy, was located at 16 S. Halsted St. It opened in 1882, and was originally operated as legitimate theatre under the ownership of W. B. Clapp. The theatre was sold to C. E. Pope in 1887. It was converted into a movie theatre for silent films in 1915. It continued to operate as a movie theatre until 1934 when it permanently closed. The building was demolished in 1936.
