= Simon-Skjodt Center for the Prevention of Genocide =

The Simon-Skjodt Center for the Prevention of Genocide (CPG) is a center affiliated with the United States Holocaust Memorial Museum. It was started in 2013 and grew out of the work of the Committee on Conscience. Their consultants include Jay Ulfelder, former director of the Political Instability Task Force.

== Early warning project ==
With assistance from Jay Ulfelder and others, CPG is building an early warning system for predicting potential conflicts and genocides.

== Media coverage ==
The work of CPG has been cited in news coverage of political events by publications such as The New York Times, The Wall Street Journal, Foreign Policy, and AllAfrica.com.

== See also ==
- Sentinel Project for Genocide Prevention
- Hatebase (a joint project of the Sentinel Project for Genocide Prevention and Mobiocracy)
- Global Database of Events, Language, and Tone
