= National Center for Civil and Human Rights =

Museum in Atlanta, Georgia, United States

Coordinates: 33.7640°N 84.3931°W

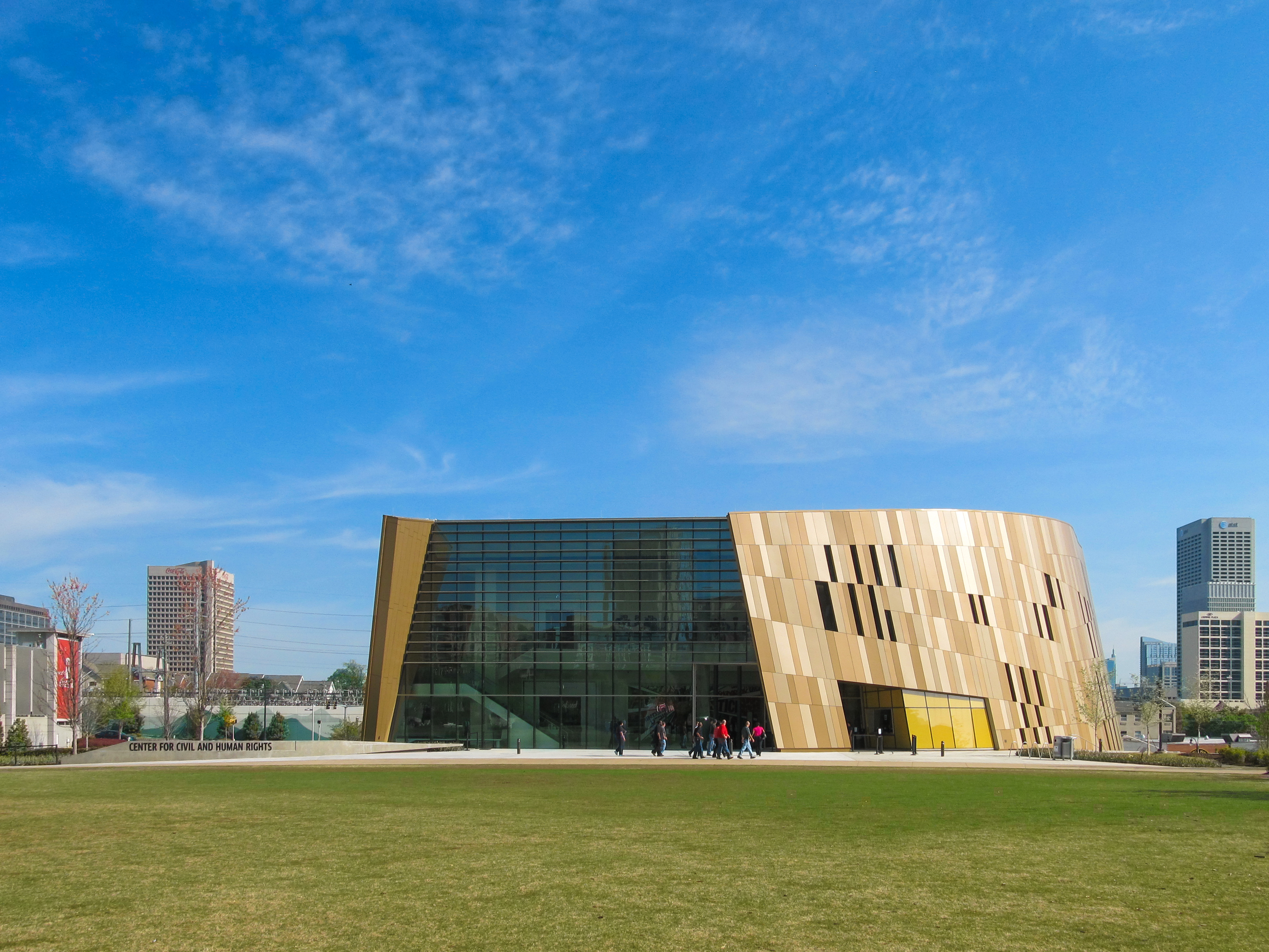
- The center in 2015
- Established: 23 June 2014
- Location: Atlanta, Georgia, US
- Collections: Papers and writings from Dr. Martin Luther King Jr.
- President: Jill Savitt (CEO)
- Curators: George C. Wolfe, Jill Savitt
- Public transit access: SEC District (W1) or Civic Center (N2) (MARTA); Centennial Olympic Park (Atlanta Streetcar)
- Parking: Adjacent garages for Georgia Aquarium and World of Coca-Cola (pay)
- Website: civilandhumanrights.org

The National Center for Civil and Human Rights is a museum dedicated to the achievements of the civil rights movement in the United States and the broader worldwide human rights movement. Located in downtown Atlanta, Georgia, the museum opened to the public on June 23, 2014.

== Creation ==
Evelyn Lowery, Juanita Abernathy, former Atlanta mayor Andrew Young, and House Representative John Lewis initially conceived the concept of the center. They were part of the movement to grant civil rights to African-Americans during the 1960s. Lowery met with Mayor Shirley Franklin in 2001, who was warm to the concept of a museum honoring Atlanta's civil rights history, but due to more pressing issues with the city's finances, the mayor was unable to help much. The group met again in 2005, at which time the mayor signed onto the project, making the center to be established in 2007.

Five architectural firms presented their design proposals in 2009. The center ultimately selected a design by architect Philip Freelon for a 90,000-square-foot (8,400 m^{2}) museum that would break ground in 2010 and open in 2012. The 2.5-acre (1.0 ha) site for the museum, at Pemberton Place, was donated by the Coca-Cola Company and is located adjacent to three popular tourist attractions; the Georgia Aquarium, the World of Coca-Cola, and Centennial Olympic Park.. The selected team included Freelon and HOK/Atlanta.

However, due to the Great Recession, fundraising was slower than expected. Support would come from Delta Air Lines and local philanthropists, including the Atlanta Falcons owner and the Home Depot co-founder Arthur Blank, each of whom contributed US$1 million. In October 2010, the center's chief executive officer, Doug Shipman, announced that the museum would be delayed a year, with a groundbreaking scheduled for 2011 and opening in 2013. In March 2011, the center announced that it had scaled back the plans for the museum, reducing its size to 63,000 square feet (5,900 m^{2}) to decrease unused space; the proposed exhibition space was left unchanged at 30,000 square feet (2,800 m^{2}).

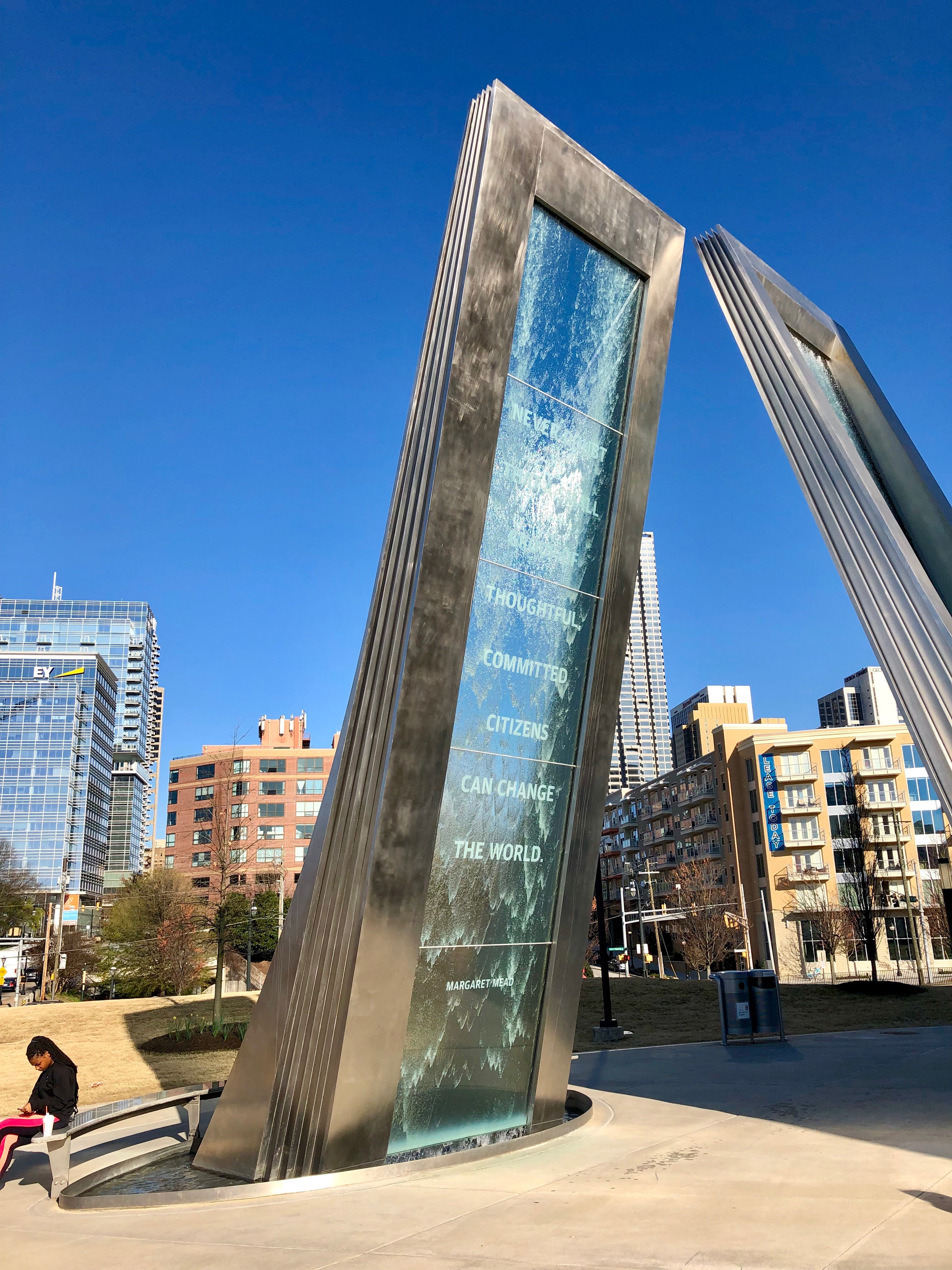
Feature at entrance of museum

In December 2011, the center announced another change in the plans for the museum, electing to build the facility in three phases, with the first 35,000-square-foot (3,300 m^{2}) phase breaking ground in June 2012 and opening Memorial Day 2014. The change was partly motivated by the threat of losing $28.5 million from a tax allocation district fund if construction was not started by June 2012. Groundbreaking finally took place on June 27, 2012, in a ceremony attended by numerous dignitaries, including then-current Atlanta Mayor Kasim Reed and former mayors Franklin and Young.

== Expansion and renovation ==
In 2025, it underwent a $58 million renovation which included adding six new galleries, doubling of the event space now with a view of the Atlanta skyline and other more immersive features, including for children under 12 who can learn about how young people have been involved in past struggles for civil and human rights. The expansion relied more on donations from foundations due to fear among corporations to donate to civil rights causes.

== Leadership ==
On January 30, 2019, the center named Jill Savitt as CEO, effective March 11, 2019. She joined the center from the Simon-Skjodt Center for the Prevention of Genocide at the United States Holocaust Memorial Museum where she served as acting director. She replaced Brian Tolleson, who was serving as interim CEO. He continued to serve on the center board.

== Exhibits ==
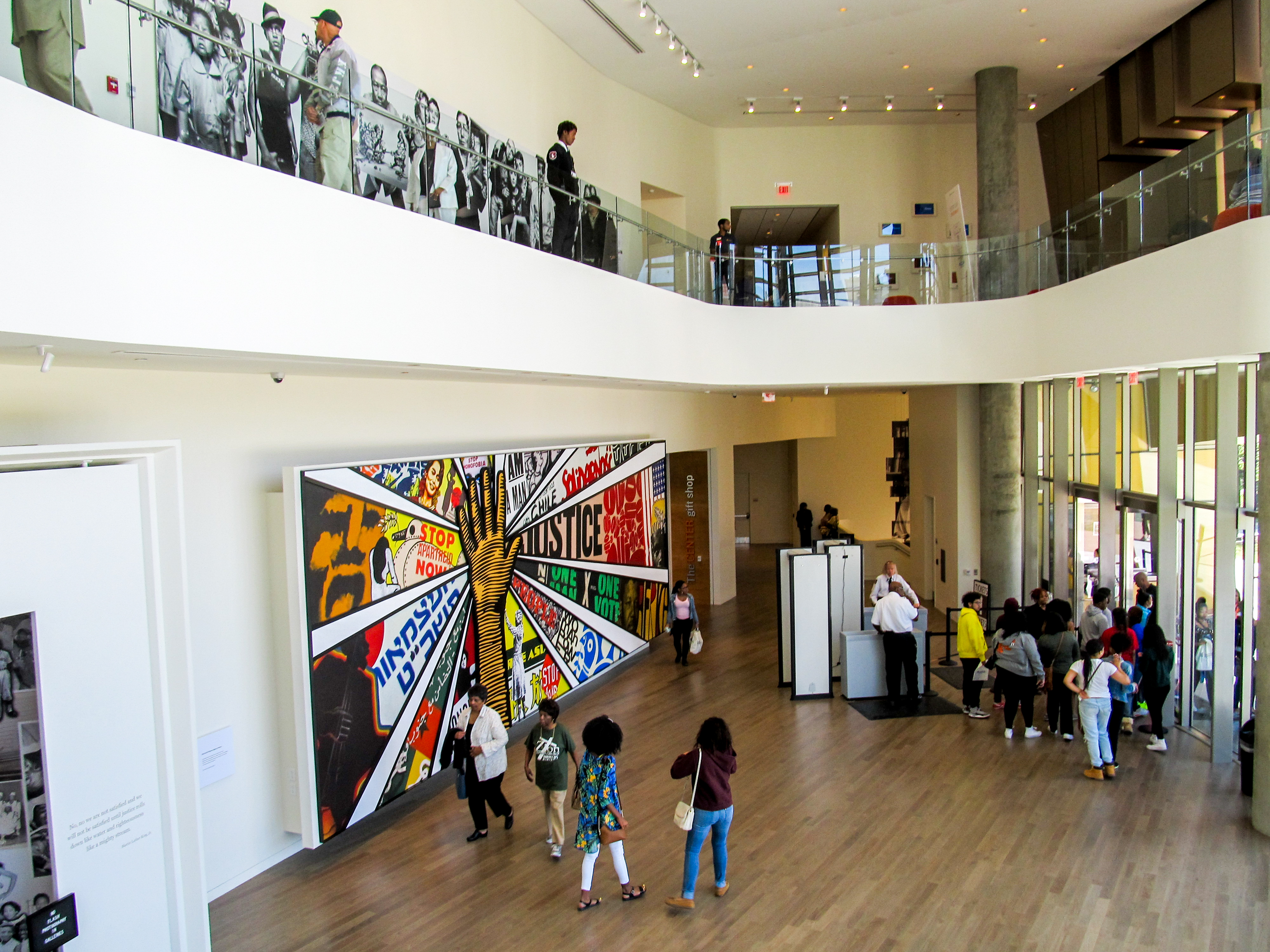
Main hall of the building

The center hosts a number of exhibitions, both permanent and temporary, that not only tell the history of the civil rights movement in the United States, but also how that period is related to more contemporary human rights struggles around the world. During the development phase of the museum, it was determined that the average museum visitor would be more familiar with the events in Sudan or the Middle East than with events in Selma, Alabama, and that the civil rights history alone would not be enough to sustain the facility. The museum opened with three permanent exhibitions, which the average visitor can view in about 75 minutes.

"Voice to the Voiceless: The Morehouse College Martin Luther King, Jr. Collection" contains personal effects that belonged to Dr. Martin Luther King Jr. The collection was obtained in 2006 when King's estate decided to sell a number of his letters and papers at auction. Before the auction took place, however, Mayor Franklin launched a bid to purchase them for $32 million, with Morehouse College owning the collection and the center having the rights to display it. The exhibit tells King's story from his youth through to his assassination and its aftermath and includes such papers as drafts of "Letter from Birmingham Jail" and "Drum Major Instinct", a sermon King delivered not long before his death.

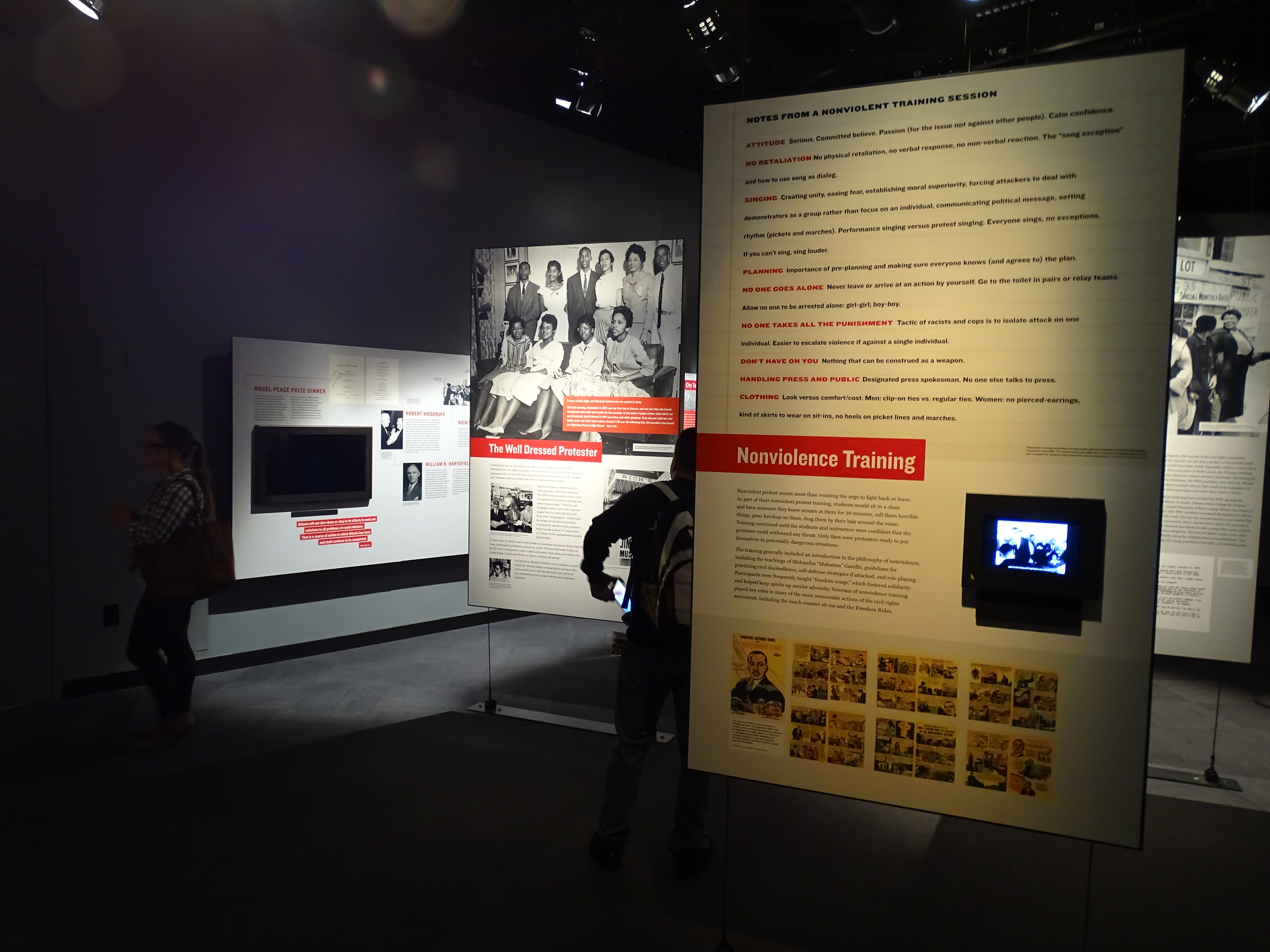
Nonviolence training exhibit

"Rolls Down Like Water: The American Civil Rights Movement" is an interactive gallery that opens with examples of segregation in the United States as embodied in Jim Crow laws and signs designating facilities as "whites only". Designed by George C. Wolfe, the Tony Award-winning playwright, the gallery is broken up into multiple sections, each marked by a significant event in the civil rights movement, like Brown vs. Board of Education. A number of the exhibits are interactive, perhaps most notably the recreation of a lunch counter sit-in complete with headphones that simulate the taunts and threats leveled at activists. A 2025 update added some of the training that those activists went through before the encounter as well as tissues and a space for people to recover from the lunch counter experience.

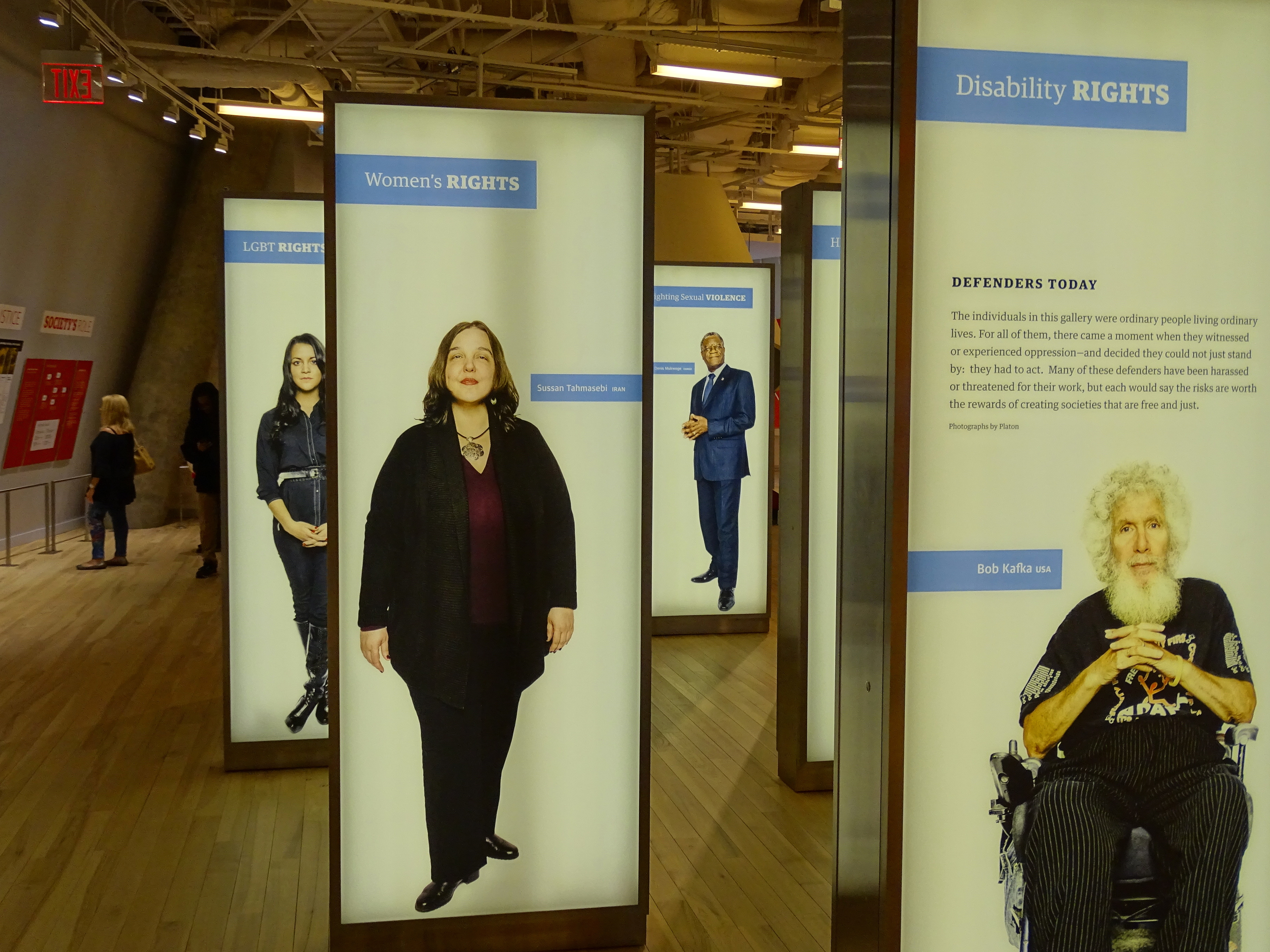
2017 photo showing some of the human rights focuses

"Spark of Conviction: The Global Human Rights Movement", unlike the other exhibits, is non-linear in design. The exhibit includes a rogues gallery of dictators, like Adolf Hitler and Augusto Pinochet, and counters them with images of modern-day activists who work to improve conditions of women and LGBT individuals around the world. One activity, called "Who Like Me", allows visitors to define themselves using a particular trait—such as their religion or gender—and shows them an individual who is persecuted in their homeland for that same trait. This exhibit was redone in 2025 to shift the focus from dictators and human rights abusers to those working to advance human rights.

== Reception ==
In early 2014, The New York Times named the Center for Civil and Human Rights as one of the biggest reasons to visit Atlanta in 2014. In a more thorough review of the center in June 2014, Edward Rothstein of the Times called the facility "imposing". Rothstein praised the design of the civil rights exhibit as "finely executed" and "the main source of the center's appeal". However, Rothstein took issue with the composition of the human rights exhibit, calling some of the components of the exhibit "arbitrary" and ultimately "leaving us with more questions than understanding".

U.S. News & World Report ranked it the #6 Best Thing to Do in Atlanta as of 2026. The Athletic also included the museum on its list of things to do during the 2026 World Cup in Atlanta.

== See also ==
- List of museums focused on African Americans
