= Online Hate Prevention Institute =

Coordinates: 37.8852°S 145.0218°E

- Abbreviation: OHPI
- Formation: 23 January 2012; 14 years ago
- Founded at: Melbourne, Australia
- Type: Charity
- Tax ID no.: 65155287657
- Legal status: Active
- Headquarters: Sydney, Australia
- Location: Caulfield South, Victoria, Australia
- Official language: English
- Board of directors: Mark Civitella; Martin Splitter; Dr Nasya Bahfen; Dr David Wishart
- Key people: Dr Andre Oboler (CEO)
- Website: www.ohpi.org.au

Online Hate Prevention Institute (OHPI) is an independent harm prevention charity established in 2012 and based in Australia.

== Overview ==
OHPI is recognised by the Government of Australia as a Harm Prevention Charity, listed on the Harm Prevention register by the Department of Families, Housing, Community Services and Indigenous Affairs. OHPI tackles a wide variety of forms of online hate speech. Work on antisemitism has been undertaken for the Global Forum for Combating Antisemitism, while work on Islamophobia has been used by the Organisation of Islamic Cooperation. The Institute is recommended as a source of specialist information on cyber Racism by the Australian Human Rights Commission, and the eSafety Commissioner.

The harm prevention charity also publishes a range of briefings and reports documenting examples of online hate. During the Coronavirus (COVID-19) pandemic, OHPI published a special series of reports documenting the slew of hate speech targeting people of Asian descent and misinformation surrounding the origin of the virus.

== Notable events ==
On 10 July 2014, Andre Oboler accused Facebook of refusing to enforce its community standards by allowing hate speech to remain online, stating that content is removed in the country where the report originated only and is still visible to others when viewed overseas.

After Facebook decided to remove Holocaust denial content in October 2020, Oboler welcomed cautious optimism about the shift of policy on the platform. Oboler called the changes "certainly very welcome" to The New Daily, but mentioned the public has to "[wait] to see it delivered on, to make sure the change isn't just words."

Oboler presented to the Asia Pacific Regional Forum on Hate Speech, Social Media and Minorities on 20 October 2020. The forum, organised by the Tom Lantos Institute and the United Nations Human Rights Special Rapporteur, sought to address human rights in the greater Asia-Pacific. Oboler spoke alongside representatives of Twitter and the Asia Centre.

Oboler presented at the United Nations' thirteenth session of the Forum on Minority Issues on 20 November 2020. The forum focused on the theme of "Hate Speech, Social Media and Minorities" and was organised by the United Nations Human Rights Special Rapporteur on minority issues. Oboler's presentation was part of the agenda item "Towards a safer space for minorities: positive initiatives to address online hate speech: the role of national human rights institutions, human rights organizations, civil society and other stakeholders" where he represented civil society alongside the Commissioner of the Human Rights Commission of Malaysia and the Director of the Facebook Oversight Board Administration. Among other recommendations, Oboler called for governments to support a wider program of work by civil society to tackle online hate.

The Inter-Parliamentary Task Force on Online Antisemitism also featured Oboler in late 2020, alongside Congresswoman and former Democratic National Committee chair Debbie Wasserman Schultz, Member of Parliament Josh Burns, and former Canadian Member of Parliament Michael Levitt, among many others. The task force addressed vulnerability of Jewish communities, the nature of online Semitism and recommendations for law makers and social media platforms.

== Fight Against Hate ==
The Online Hate Prevention Institute developed a web based application titled Fight Against Hate to track response times by social networks such as Facebook, Twitter and YouTube in responding to reports of hate speech. The Fight Against Hate website was last captured by the Wayback Machine sometime after August 2023, and as of May 2025 (or earlier) is a dead site.

== See also ==
- Antisemitism
- Homophobia
- Misogyny
- Victimology
