= ICESI University =

Private university in Cali, Colombia

Icesi University
- Former name: Profesional
- Motto in English: "We teach to learn"
- Type: Private
- Established: 1979
- Endowment: US$988.626
- President: Esteban Piedrahita
- Students: 6087 (2018-1)
- Location: (Colombia) Pance, Santiago de Cali, Valle del Cauca, COL
- Colors: Blue, White and Green
- Nickname: ICESI
- Website: www.icesi.edu.co

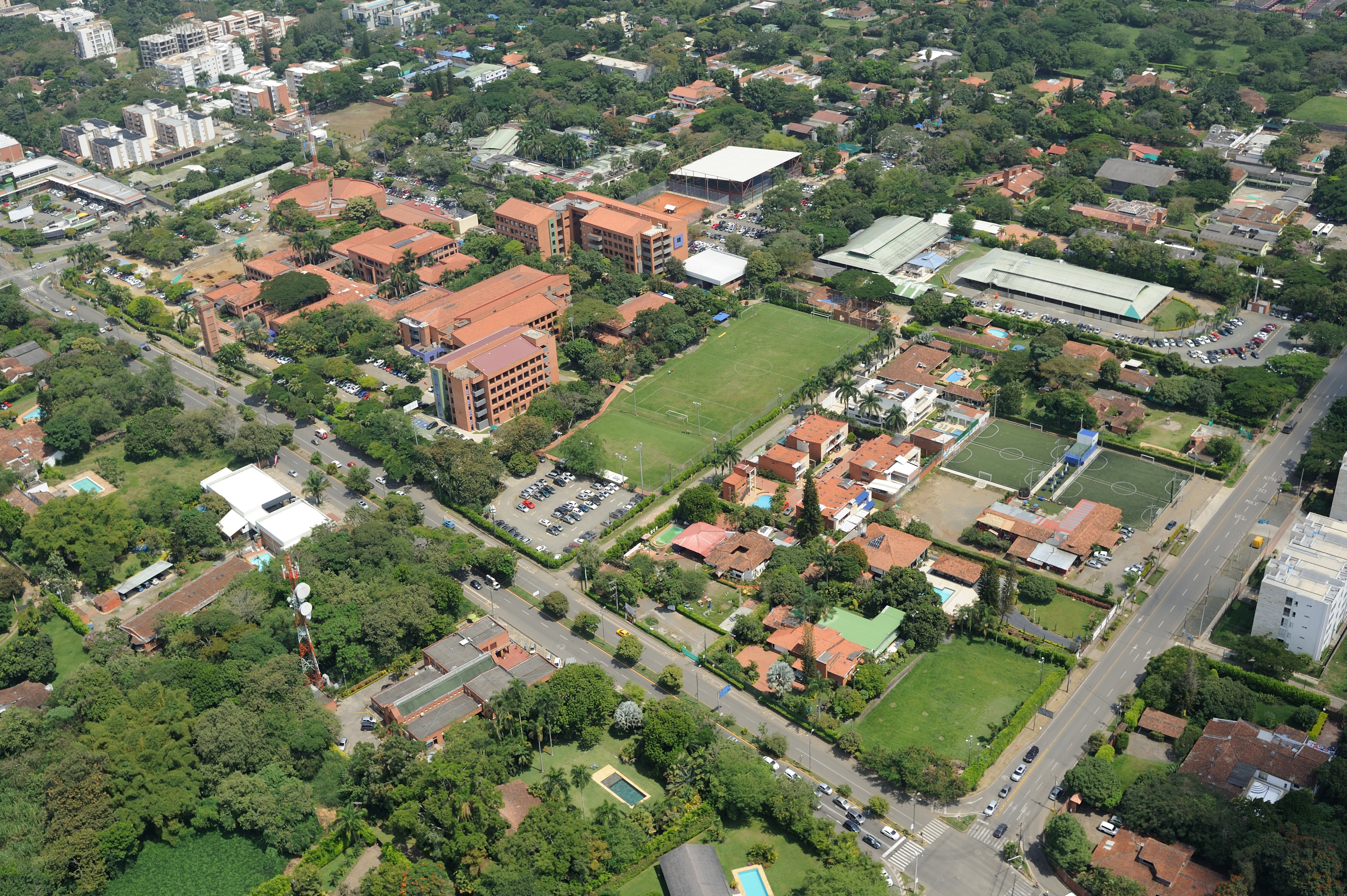
Icesi University

Icesi University (Spanish: Universidad Icesi. Originally the initials of Instituto Colombiano de Estudios Superiores de Incolda, the Colombian Institute of Higher Studies of Incolda) is a private university located in Cali, Colombia. The campus is located in the area of Pance, south of the city. Founded in 1979 by a group of businessmen in the region. Icesi University with a campus of 141,334 square meters, offers undergraduate programs, specializations, masters and doctorates.

In 2010, the Icesi University of Cali, was the first private University in southwestern Colombia, in the High Quality Institutional Accreditation. In 2015, the Ministry of National Education granted the renewal of the High Quality Institutional Accreditation, until 2021.

Icesi University has 13 accredited programs: Medicine, Telematics Engineering, Systems Engineering, Industrial Engineering, Industrial Design, Business Administration, Economics and International Business, Law, Public Accounting and Finance, Pharmaceutical Chemistry, Economics and International Business, Media Design Interactive, International Marketing and Advertising, Psychology and Political Science.

The University had 14 research groups in Colciencias, seven of them are located (according to the new classification of research groups of Colciencias) classified in category A1, 2 in category A, 3 in category B, and 1 in category C.^{1}

== Faculties ==
Today Icesi has five faculties and the School of Education. The five faculties are: Administrative and Economic Sciences, Engineering, Law and Social Sciences, Natural Sciences and Health Sciences; together they offer 29 undergraduate programs, 1 Doctoral Program, 25 master's programs and 21 medical-surgical specializations; all academic offerings are approved by the Ministry of National Education.

Faculty of Administrative and Economic Sciences

Undergraduate Programs:

- Business Administration with an emphasis in International Business
- Public Accounting and International Finance
- Economics
- Economics and International Business
- International Marketing and Advertising
- Finance

Postgraduate Programs:

- Icesi MBA
- MBA Global - Icesi Tulane
- Marketing
- Finance
- Management of Health Organizations
- Accounting and Taxation
- Doctorate: Business Economics

Faculty of Engineering, Design and Applied Science

Undergraduate Programs:

- Systems Engineering
- Telematics Engineering
- Industrial Engineering
- Industrial design
- Interactive Media Design
- Biochemical Engineering
- Biology (with focus in Conservation and Molecular Biology / Biotechnology)
- Chemistry (with an emphasis in Biochemistry)
- Pharmaceutical Chemistry

Postgraduate Programs:

- Informatics and Telecommunications Management
- Master's Degree in Computing and Telecommunications (Research)
- Industrial Engineering
- Master's Degree in Innovation Management
- Master's Degree in Project Management
- Master's Data Science
- Master's Degree in Formulation of Chemicals and Derivatives
- Master's Degree in Biotechnology (Research)
- Master's Degree in Sciences - Biotechnology (Research)

Faculty of Human Sciences

Undergraduate Programs:

- Law
- Anthropology
- Psychology
- Sociology
- Political Science with emphasis in International Relations
- Music
- Degree in Basic Primary Education
- Bachelor of Arts
- Bachelor of Foreign Languages (with emphasis in English)
- Degree in Natural Sciences
- Degree in social sciences
- Degree in Literature and Spanish Language

Postgraduate Programs:

- Law
- Government
- Psychosocial intervention
- Management for Social Innovation
- Social and Political Studies (Research)
- Master of Law (Research)
- Education
- Master's Program in the Teaching of English as a Foreign Language
- Teaching English as a Foreign Language
- ICT-mediated Education (Virtual modality)

Faculty of Health Sciences

Undergraduate Programs:

- Medicine
- Bacteriology and Clinical Laboratory

Postgraduate Programs:

- Arthroscopy • Cardiology • Pediatric Cardiology • Dermatology • Gynecology and Obstetrics • Hematology and Oncology • Internal Medicine Nephrology • Pediatrics • Liaison Psychiatry • Radiology and diagnostic images • Rheumatology • Abdominal Organ Transplant Surgery • Allergology • Head and neck surgery • Emergency Medicine • Psychiatry • Neurology • Neurosurgery • Pediatric Nephrology • Anesthesiology • Orthopedics and Traumatology • Infectious Disease

CDEE (Center for the Development of Entrepreneurship)

Postgraduate Programs:

- Enterprise Creation

== Accreditations ==
Today Icesi has five faculties and the School of Education. The five faculties are: Administrative and Economic Sciences, Engineering, Law and Social Sciences, Natural Sciences and Health Sciences; together they offer 27 undergraduate programs, 1 Doctoral Program, 25 master's programs and 23 medical-surgical specializations; all academic offerings are approved by the Ministry of National Education and are recognized to be of the highest quality due to being endorsed by the following national and international accreditations:

• High Quality Institutional Accreditation certified by the National Accreditation Council of the Ministry of National Education.

• International Accreditation AACSB (Association to Advance Collegiate Schools of Business), an international institution that certifies the academic quality of business faculties around the world.

• Accreditation AMBA (Association of MBAs), an impartial authority established in London for the certification of the graduate programs in business faculties.

• ABET Accreditation (Accreditation Board for Engineering and Technology), one of the most important engineering program accreditation committees in the world, based in Baltimore, United States.

== International experience ==
The Office of International Relations, together with the faculties of the Icesi University, identifies, promotes, coordinates and evaluates academic and cultural programs, with the purpose of developing in its students the competencies to understand and act, in an effective way, in a globalized world. For this reason, it has established bilateral and multilateral cooperation agreements with universities, higher education institutions, research centers, international cooperation organizations and government entities to facilitate the process of internationalization of academic programs and the development of the global perspective of the students.

Reason why, it foments international experiences in the students through several modalities: realization of semesters of exchange in other universities, with which it has an agreement; internships and work practices abroad; as well as short programs of visits to other countries, either in missions, visits or summer programs, among others. Icesi currently has agreements in more than 870 international destinations (United States, Canada, Germany, Argentina, Australia, Austria, Belgium, Botswana, Brazil, Bulgaria, Chile, China, Korea, Costa Rica, Czech Republic, Denmark, United Arab Emirates, Ecuador, Spain, Estonia, Fiji, Finland, France, Ghana, Hungary, Iceland, India, Italy, Japan, Latvia, Lithuania, Mala, Morocco, Mexico, Netherlands, New Zealand, Nicaragua, Norway, Peru, Poland, Portugal, Puerto Rico, Russia, South Africa, Sweden, Switzerland, Thailand, United Kingdom, Uruguay).
