= Identity tourism =

Assuming an identity for recreational purposes

Identity tourism refers to the ways in which travel ties into different dimensions of identity. It covers travel motivated by interest in ones own or others' racial, ethnic, socioeconomic, sexual or gender identity. It also concerns the construction of cultural identities and re-examination of one's ethnic and cultural heritage via tourism.

Research on the topic of identity and tourism dates back to a 1984 special issue of Annals of Tourism Research guest edited by Pierre L. van den Berghe and Charles F. Keyes. This volume examined the ways in which tourism intersects with the (re-)formation and revision of various forms of identity, particularly ethnic and cultural identities. Since that time, various scholars have examined the intersection between dimensions of identity and tourism. For instance, anthropologist Edward Bruner wrote extensively about tourism and personal identity change in a key article published in the Annals of Tourism Research (See Bruner, Edward M. 1991. “The Transformation of Self in Tourism.” Annals of Tourism Research 18 (2): 238–50).

The way people construct and re-examine their ethnic and cultural heritage can also occur through the internet.

Early contributions of identity tourism allowed scholars to examine the intersection of tourism and identity. Early scholars conducted investigations regarding the influence of the locations of tourism and how the culture portrayed influenced the visitors' images and cultural stereotypes (see work by Pierre van den Berghe, Edward Bruner and others).

== History ==
An important early contribution to the study of identity tourism was Lanfant, Allcock and Bruner's 1995 edited volume International Tourism, Identity and Change. As with the Keyes and van den Berghe special issue of Annals of Tourism Research, this volume moved the field away from studying the impact of tourism on identity to investigating the intersection of tourism and identity in more dynamic ways, among other things looking at how "local" and "tourist" identities are mutually-constructed. Likewise, Michel Picard and Robert Wood's who edited volume Tourism, Ethnicity and the State in Asian and Pacific Societies (1997, University of Hawaii Press), examined the ways in which tourism intersections with ethnic, cultural, regional and national identities, as well as with the political agendas of Pacific island and Southeast Asian states. Abrams, Waldren and Mcleod's 1997 volume Tourists and Tourism: Identifying with People and Places also offered case studies examining issues surrounding the construction of identity in the context of tourism. Among other things, the chapters in their volume investigated tourists' views of themselves and others in the course of their travels, the relationship of travelers to resident populations, and the ways in which tourists' quests for authenticity are entangled with their own sensibilities about their own identities.

Case studies of tourism and identity include Edward Bruner's 2001 article "The Masai and the Lion King: Authenticity, Nationalism and Globalization in African Tourism", which examines how various Kenyan tourist sites entail displays of particular identities ("Masai" "Colonialist" etc.) and how tourists' engagements with these identity displays are varied, nuanced and complex, articulating with their own narratives, sensibilities about African heritage and quests. Kathleen M. Adams' 2006 work on tourism, identity and the arts in Toraja, Indonesia illustrates how tourism is drawn upon by different members of the community to elaborate different dimensions of identity. In "Art as Politics: Re-crafting tourism, identities and power in Tana Toraja, Indonesia", Adams documents how tourism challenges older elite identities in the community, reconfiguring artistic and ritual symbols once associated with elites as broader symbols of Toraja ethnic group identity. Amanda Stronza's 2008 work on tourism and identity in the Amazon has illustrated how tourism appears to be causing new differentiation of identities within the community she researched (see "Through a New Mirror: Reflections on Tourism and Identity in the Amazon"). A 2011 edited volume by Burns and Novelli also offers a number of case studies on the topic of tourism and social identities.

Alyssa Cymene Howe studied how identity tourism interacted in the San Francisco queer space in the 90s. She found that tourism created, for both tourists and residents of San Francisco, a sense of group identity. The creation of the "Queer Homeland" of San Francisco owes part of its identity to tourism as a practice itself.

== Cyberspace ==
Identity is not static but a dynamic concept that is determined by development, culture, and the society that an individual is exposed to. Cyberspace, which allows individuals to interact with other people from different cultures can allow people to expand their identities. In 2011, an edited volume on Tourism Social Media: Transformations in Identity, Community, and Culture by hospitality and business school scholars highlights some of these issues. Today, locations can now attract people from all over the world through smart tourism. These tourists could use sensors, scanners, and other smart devices to interact with these culturally rich places. Such initiatives have been used to manage tourists during peak season. Moreover, there are various programs and applications, such as chat rooms, forums, MUDs, MOOs, and MMORPGs, among others where a user is allowed to establish an identity in that particular space. This online identity could be different from a user's physical identity in race, gender, height, weight or even species. People create profiles online to interact with online. Such an identity could be completely random and friend interacting with this new identity will be exposed to maybe the fictional name of the participant. In these chat rooms and forums, a user creates their identity through text and the way they interact with others. In MMORPGs, users create a visual representation of their identity through an avatar. This allows users to easily tour more than just ethnic and cultural identities. So, the emergence of the internet as a venue of identity expression is also relevant to the theme of tourism and identity.

Identity tourism in cyberspace is facilitated by the ontological discussion that challenges the perspective of space and place to include the cyberspace. Cyberspace is then equivalent to real other real physical spaces offline. Therefore, the same way people today use cyberspace to shop, entertain and date, Ziyed Guelmami and François Nicolle state that it can also be a platform to construct identity. The construction of identity online is equated to identity tourism because it fits the definition of tourism that defines it as people traveling and staying in places outside their usual environment for various purposes.

With the development of the internet and virtual reality, identity tourism can become more salient than previously thought. With virtual reality, for example, transgender individuals can control their own gender presentation in an MMORPG or forum. Lisa Nakamura has studied identity tourism in cyberspace, using it to describe the process of appropriating an identity involving another gender and/or race than one's own on the web. Keller (2019) also states that the youth, especially the young modern women uses the internet to explore feminist activism. An individual may also come from a very conservative family but through social media platforms like Twitter, they are able to explore various conversations like those related to dressing choice, something that she might not be able to access in her real life. Therefore, through cyberspace, they are able to explore a certain identity and even adopt it as theirs. Another unfortunate phenomena explored on the internet is Jihadi ideologies. Prucha (2016) reveals that extremist groups have used social media to create a wealth of information on Jihad. Through cyberspace, curious individuals have been able to access the information, adopted extremism as their identity and even traveled to the Islamic State to live the Jihad life. This kind of cyber-identity tourism mainly refers to the web but also touch other media forms, such as video games. Being able to 'tour' the internet with a new identity opens the possibility of the net being an identifiable space.

Nakamura also mentions the popular cartoon "On the Internet, nobody knows you’re a dog", in her journal "Race In/For Cyberspace: Identity Tourism and Racial Passing on the Internet”. This image portrays an aspect of identity tourism and how on the internet anyone can describe their physical selves in any way; “on the internet nobody knows you’re a dog”, it is possible to portray yourself as a different race, gender, age, sexuality, etc., in other words “computer crossdressing”. The internet allows people to communicate in real time all while controlling their image and the conditions which people perceive them. Nakamura describes the cartoon as celebrating the internet's ability as a social leveler, which allows anyone, even dogs, to freely self-represent themselves in any way, shape or form.

=== Tourism through the Internet of Things (IoT) ===
With the internet of things, the inter-connectivity presented in the internet allows users to interact with a chosen environment than it was ever possible in the past. Platforms that are often used for social identity tourism include Facebook, Twitter, Google+, YouTube, Instagram, and Pinterest. Different age groups may prefer different platforms. For example, today, an interface can be built and allow more direct interaction of users with facilities and other services or product offered by the tourist destination. The action can be achieved through sensors and smart products that have the ability to sense actual physical actions that are translated to the digital form creating an embodied interaction. The electronic identification system also allows cross border authentication for online cross-border services that may be needed for internet users to access tourism online.

The study of online identity tourism draws attention to important considerations about how individuals allow virtual reality to shape their identity. However, Ruangkanjanases et al. (2020) reveals that the reshaping of identity affects the individual perceives themselves as useful. This way, people can also quantify the success of social media and justify its use. Unfortunately, due to the temptation that people have on social media to compare themselves with others, they might find their new identity unsatisfactory. The result is lower identity clarity and overall self-esteem.
