= Sentinel Project for Genocide Prevention =

The Sentinel Project for Genocide Prevention
- Founded: August 2008 by Christopher Tuckwood and Taneem Talukdar
- Type: Non-Profit; International NGO
- Location: Toronto, Ontario, Canada
- Services: Building an early warning system for genocide prevention
- Fields: Genocide Prevention, Early Warning System, Human Rights, Research, Social Innovation, Creative Technologies
- Website: thesentinelproject.org

The Sentinel Project for Genocide Prevention (commonly known as The Sentinel Project) is an international non-governmental organisation based in Toronto, Ontario, Canada, with approximately 60 members in North America. Its mission is "to prevent the crime of genocide worldwide through effective early warning and cooperation with victimized peoples to carry out non-violent prevention initiatives." The Sentinel Project was founded in 2008 by two students, Taneem Talukdar and Christopher Tuckwood, at the University of Waterloo. In 2009, the Sentinel Project's approach was selected as a finalist in Google's 10 to the 100th competition for innovative social application of technology. This organization has been recognized as one of four active anti-genocide organizations based in Canada and is a member of the International Alliance to End Genocide, and the International Coalition for the Responsibility to Protect.

== Operations ==
(L to R) SP Volunteers Abhishek Bhatnagar, Mikel Cavia and Lisa Leong

The Sentinel Project is developing a genocide risk assessment, forecasting and situation monitoring process to monitor vulnerable communities worldwide. Their objective is to systematically collect and assess data using a framework of analysis based on existing genocide research. This framework is used to systematically track "Situations of Concern" (SOCs), release regular forecasts and guide response strategies. Regular threat assessment updates with background analysis on root cause and context are consistently released. The Sentinel Project works with vulnerable communities to develop non-violent strategies and counter-measures to address the risk factors and operational processes identified as the underlying causes of the genocidal threat by effectively engaging target communities, policy-makers, NGOs and the media and developing on-the-ground information networks in SOCs. To support the process, the Sentinel Project had developed an online threat tracking, visualization, and broadcast early warning platform that aggregates public data from a wide range of sources in real-time: media stories, socioeconomic data, NGO reports, SMS, Twitter, Facebook, Blogs, etc. The project released its first public threat assessment report in May 2009. This report focused on the persecution of the Baháʼí Faith community in Iran. Since then, the group released two other reports on Kenya and Azerbaijan, and is currently working on assessment reports on the risk of genocide in Myanmar, Colombia and Indonesia. The group's reports and analysis have been disseminated by various media sources and advocacy organizations. To support its mission, the organization plans to create a Sentinel Hub, one of the world's first workspaces dedicated to developing and employing technologies for predicting and preventing mass atrocities.

== Organization ==
The Sentinel Project team comprises volunteers from a diverse set of backgrounds including Anthropology, Conflict Studies, Communications and Mass Media, History, Political Science, Public Relations, War Crimes Investigation, Military Intelligence and Software Engineering. The organization has 3 main teams: Research, Technology and Operations. The research team conducts the risk assessment process which involves collecting information based on existing research, is responsible for developing an effective Early Warning System (EWS) to predict and determine the likelihood of genocide occurring in a given SOC, monitors events in SOCs to identify genocidal processes and key actors responsible, and is also responsible for staying up-to-date with current developments in genocide studies. The Technology team is responsible for building the ThreatWiki software platform that enables on-going monitoring and analysis processes and the operations team supports the day-to-day functions of the organization, such as fund-raising and volunteer management. The team is based in Toronto, Ontario, Canada with some members in the United States. The Sentinel Project also comprises individual experts who make up the Advisory Council. Members of the organization's Advisory Council include Gregory Stanton, Adam Jones, and Jack Chow. These individuals provide advice and guidance in key areas of expertise and fields such as Genocide Studies, Non-Profit Management, and Humanitarian Intelligence.

== Genocide prevention ==
The Sentinel Project's EWS is meant to strengthen efforts to prevent genocide from occurring in areas at very high risk. Because many genocidal regimes throughout history have been sensitive to internal and external pressure during their preparation process, the Sentinel Project contends that the sooner the threat of genocide is identified, the more options there are for preventing it. While only military force can stop killing in progress, there are many non-violent options available for disrupting the genocidal process before extermination begins. When the threat of genocide is identified, the Sentinel Project aims to share the information with existing advocacy groups which can push for government and international measures while simultaneously consulting with subject-matter experts (SMEs) and targeted groups to craft preventive measures. Examples of such measures include countering hate speech often used to promote violence against specific groups. The Sentinel Project's EWS is a collection of people, tools and processes involved in gathering, analyzing and disseminating information on the risk of genocide. The EWS begins with Research Analyst examining the main characteristics that predispose a country to genocide. Research information is gathered from governmental, NGO, United Nations and academic sources. A list of risk factors is used to create a comprehensive risk profile before initiating active monitoring. Based on Gregory Stanton's "Eight Stages of Genocide" model, Operational Process Monitoring (OPM) begins when a country is declared an SOC during the risk assessment phase. Operational processes are the components of the overall genocidal process which facilitate the extermination of a specific group of people. The goal of OPM is to consistently gather event-based information from media and NGO reports, correspondents on the ground, and contacts within vulnerable communities. A Vulnerability Assessment is also done to examine the characteristics and actors within an SOC to determine a community's vulnerability to attack. Finally, analysts release regular situation forecasts in anticipation of situation developments and potential changes to the threat level of genocide.

== Social innovations ==
Through its early warning capabilities, the Sentinel Project occupies a unique niche in the genocide prevention community. While many other organizations do the work of maintaining watch lists of countries with violent, repressive governments where genocide could happen, the Sentinel Project's genocide early warning system fulfills a function not currently done by any other organization. The Sentinel Project strives to identify situations of concern at a much earlier stage when there are many options for prevention, and engages directly with the threatened communities to inform and empower them to participate in the prevention of their own genocides. From gathering information right through to implementing preventive measures, technology plays a key role in almost everything the Sentinel Project does. Here are a few major technological innovations developed by the organization to fulfill its mission:

=== ThreatWiki ===
The Sentinel Project launched its first prototype of ThreatWiki in May 2011 to start actively tracking and monitoring two situations of concern: Kenya and Iran. ThreatWiki is a data visualization platform that helps display operational processes within an SOC in the context of genocide threat. The platform presents an interactive display model that allows visitors to its website to be able to view and explore the root causes, relationships and operational processes behind an early warning released by the organization. The Sentinel Project is currently working on making ThreatWiki an open source project and its source code repository is now live on GitHub. Research Analysts at the Sentinel Project use ThreatWiki to input data from reliable sources to track SOCs with the help of a visual time-line that enables them to track the SOCs more closely. ThreatWiki shows exactly where events such as arrests, arson, or raids have taken place and the data point is not just a vague point on the map; "we are talking about cities, towns, latitude, and longitude of the area where the incident occurred." ThreatWiki also shows correlations on how incidents are related to one another according to how they are tagged. Improvements to ThreatWiki will soon make visualizations more interactive and informative.

=== Hatebase ===
Launched on 25 March 2013, Hatebase is the world's largest online repository of structured multi-lingual, usage-based hate speech. It is an attempt by the Sentinel Project and Mobiocracy to create a repository of words and phrases that researchers can use to detect the early stages of genocide and remains in active development. Hatebase offers two main features: a Wikipedia-like interface which allows users to classify and record location-specific "sightings", and an authenticating API that allows developers to mesh Hatebase data with other tools for genocide prevention. Critics have identified the challenges of capturing, organizing, and conceptualizing communication data through a cultural lens such as The Human Stain conundrum i.e. some words are only hateful in specific contexts. Data collected through Hatebase alone therefore cannot be used to predict ethnic violence, but used in conjunction with other warning factors (such as those from ThreatWiki), can provide insights about when words are about to spill over into actions.

== Situations of concern ==
=== Azerbaijan ===
The Artsakh or NKR, an ethnic Armenian enclave, has been claimed by Azerbaijan since its secession from the USSR in 1991. The ethnic Armenian population in the breakaway region of Nagorno-Karabakh is vulnerable, at risk of violence, and frequently the object of hate speech, sometimes by government officials. Since the 1992–1994 Nagorno-Karabakh War that followed the NKR secession and resulted in the occupation of former Azeri territory bordering the NKR by Armenian forces, more than 600,000 civilians have been displaced from their homes. Although pogroms, violence against civilians, and alleged genocide has occurred in the past, Azerbaijan's ethnic Armenian population is protected by the autonomous but unrecognized state of Nagorno-Karabakh which maintains its own military and receives assistance from the Armenian government. Therefore, the risk of genocide in Azerbaijan is directly linked to the risk of war. The occupation of the NKR by Azeri forces would need to happen before mass atrocities could be committed. Through its application of genocide models and analysis the Sentinel Project has assessed that Azerbaijan does not exhibit many of the conditions often seen as precursors to modern genocides. The Sentinel Project's Risk Assessment Report on Azerbaijan concludes that while the risk of genocide in Azerbaijan is high, in the event Heydar Aliyev's regime gains access to the ethnic Armenian population within the NKR, war is unlikely since it is seen as risky and potentially fatal to the regime.

=== Iran ===
Supplementary Report: The Threat of Genocide to the Baháʼís of Iran (2010)

The Sentinel Project initiated its first SOC to assess the threat of genocide to members of the Baháʼí Faith in Iran. Baháʼís comprise the largest religious minority in Iran, with an estimated 300,000 members in the country, but are highly persecuted by the government and some non-state groups for their religious beliefs. The Sentinel Project's May 2009 report identified several risk factors that contribute to a high threat of genocide against Iran's Baháʼís. These factors include economic stresses, prior persecution of Baháʼís, their exclusion from higher education and ongoing propaganda which links Baháʼís to foreign enemies. The report also identified various official security forces, such as the Iranian Revolutionary Guards Corps, and semi-official paramilitary groups, such as the Basij militia, who could potentially or eventually be perpetrators of genocide against Baháʼí. An update to this report was released in November 2010. The update outlined many new developments including the impact of the 2009 post-election violence and persistent tensions surrounding the Iranian nuclear program. The threat level was assessed to remain high, particularly since the regime had demonstrated its willingness (after the election) to use paramilitary forces to suppress what it views as internal enemies. Today, the threat of genocide to the Baháʼís of Iran remains very high because of the systematic persecution of the Iranian Baháʼí community, especially in the educational spheres and institutions, the arbitrary arrest of Baháʼí teachers, raiding of Baháʼí homes, discrimination of Baháʼí students in Iranian public schools, abductions of human rights activists by plainclothes agents, an increase in human rights abuses specifically targeted on the Baháʼís of Iran and an upsurge in executions of Iranians in general.

=== Kenya ===
ThreatWiki: Kenya SOC Correlations

Kenya's recent transition to democracy has seen episodes of large scale violence as different groups compete for power. The 2007 Kenyan post-election period was characterized by severe unrest born out of a political and social order marked by ethnocentrism and intertribal antagonism after the Luos and Kalenjin disputed the outcome of the national elections as flawed. After a comprehensive risk assessment of social, economic and political factors that increase the likelihood of genocide in Kenya, the Sentinel Project's May 2011 report identified several risk factors including; a low degree of democracy, isolation from the international community, high levels of military expenditure, severe government discrimination or active repression of native groups, socioeconomic deprivation combined with group-based inequality and a legacy of intergroup hatred among other risk factors. Following its initial risk assessment report and with another national election scheduled for December 2012, the Sentinel Project maintained Kenya as a high risk situation of concern and responded by initiating an operational monitoring process to monitor the situation in Kenya as it developed on a daily basis. Through its continued monitoring and evaluation process, in November 2012 the Sentinel Project released an update to its annual assessment on the risk of genocide in Kenya in order to reflect recent developments that correspond to each of the 30 risk factors in its early warning framework.

The Sentinel Project also responded by deploying a small team to Kenya in order to learn more about the work of the dedicated local groups trying to prevent violence in the country. The team conducted field work in the Tana River District, where there had been a series of small skirmishes and ethnic massacres which occurred between August 2012 and January 2013. In their Tana Delta Field Survey Report, the team highlighted the drivers of violence and potential preventive measures for decreasing the risk of violence from escalating. Some of the drivers of conflict that the team identified include: misinformation and conflicting accounts of occurring events, unverified reports of arms flows into the area, accusations of foreign interference, lack of title deeds for land, suspicions of political betrayal, and perceptions of government favoritism. The Sentinel Project recommends establishing a trusted, neutral source of information which can help to dispel much of the rumour and intentional disinformation that fuels violence in Tana River as a potential conflict prevention measure. The team also acted as observers in the general election which took place on 4 March 2013. The team's election monitoring role was directly related to the Sentinel Project's risk assessment on the likelihood of mass atrocities in Kenya which determined that the presidential election was the most likely trigger for a repeat or even possible escalation of the 2008 post-election violence.

=== Other ===
The scope of the Sentinel Project's monitoring work includes three other situations of concern: Colombia, Indonesia, and Myanmar. These countries were selected by balancing their apparent risk levels with the organization's resources and the ability to have a positive impact on the ground.

== Partnerships ==
The Sentinel Project seeks to cooperate with ethnic and religious communities; legislators, policy and decision makers in the United States, Canada and Europe; and other international NGOs to influence government policy towards SOC countries. The Sentinel Projects also seeks to partner with human rights and anti-genocide groups with well-established credibility and the ability to reach governments, institutions and civil society. These partnerships may also be for more effective information gathering or cooperation in disseminating reports. For example, while investigating the situation-of-concern regarding followers of the Baháʼí Faith in Iran, the Sentinel Project worked together with the Baháʼí Community of Canada and the Middle East-based Muslim Network for Baháʼí Rights. The Sentinel Project also works with both local and international non-profits or associations with a mandate that focuses on conflict, human rights or genocide and located in the SOC's geographical location. In Kenya, the Sentinel Project has started forming partnerships with two organizations, The Center for Human Rights and Democracy which boasts of a large network of conflict monitors in the Rift Valley and Uchaguzi, a Kenyan-based organization that takes a crowdsourcing approach in mapping indicators of ethnic violence before and during elections. The Sentinel Project is also a partner with the PAX Project, a technology-based data collection project currently being developed in the United Kingdom with the goal of preventing genocide and mass atrocities by assisting partner NGOs in monitoring the media and other information sources.

== See also ==
- Genocide
- Responsibility to Protect
