= Black Twitter: A People's History =

2024 documentary film series

- Genre: Docuseries
- Showrunner: Joie Jacoby
- Written by: Jason Parham
- Directed by: Prentice Penny
- Starring: W. Kamau Bell; Jemele Hill; Rembert Browne; Kid Fury; Baratunde Thurston; Brandon "Jinx" Jenkins; Jamilah Lemieux; April Reign
- No. of episodes: 3

Production
- Executive producers: List: Prentice Penny; Alex Soler; Chris Pollack; Sarah Amos; Helen Estabrook; Agnes Chu; Andrew Whitney; Raeshem Nijhon; Carri Twigg; Nicole Galovski; Shawna Carroll
- Producer: Jason Parham
- Production companies: A Penny for Your Thoughts; WIRED Studios; Onyx Collective

Original release
- Network: Hulu
- Release: May 9, 2024

Black Twitter: A People's History is a 2024 documentary film series about the history of Black Twitter. The series is produced by Onyx Collective.

The three-part docuseries is based on Jason Parham's 2021 Wired story and was directed by Prentice Penny.

The series chronicles the oral history of the influence of the Black community on American society and politics since the Obama administration. It also shows how Black people had used Twitter as a general means of expression to comment on everyday life. It touches on a range of serious topics (Black Lives Matter, Trayvon Martin, January 6 United States Capitol attack), but also more humorous topics (the TV drama Scandal, Crying Jordan meme).

The trailer for the series was released on Wednesday, April 24, 2024. The series then premiered at the South by Southwest (SXSW) film festival in March 2024 and debuted to the public on Hulu on Thursday, May 9, 2024.

== Development ==
Penny was finishing the scripted show Insecure and wanted something different when thinking about his next project. He goes on to share his reasoning on why he accepted this series as his next project:

"When I was looking for my next project, Black Twitter: A People's History excited me because I knew it would be a challenge and make me feel scared again creatively," Penny says. "If we don't document our history, who will? Making this docuseries with Onyx Collective showed me that the power was never in the platform; it was always in us. As expected, Black Twitter has many thoughts, and I can't wait to see who all gon' be there on May 9!"

== Guests ==
The following guest star in the series:

- TJ Adeshola (former head of Global Content Partnerships, Twitter)
- W. Kamau Bell (comedian; director, We Need to Talk About Cosby)
- Dr. André Brock (communications professor; author, Distributed Blackness: African American Cybercultures)
- Rembert Browne (journalist; former director of Product and Community, Twitter)
- Dr. Meredith Clark (journalism professor; creator, Archiving Black Twitter)
- Kid Fury (TV writer and host, The Read)
- Roxane Gay (author; cultural critic, The New York Times)
- Jemele Hill (author, journalist)
- Sam Jay (comedian, writer)
- Brad Jenkins (former associate director of the White House Office of Public Engagement, 2011-2015)
- Brandon "Jinx" Jenkins (journalist, host, creative director)
- Luvvie Ajayi Jones (New York Times bestselling author)
- Shamika Klassen (researcher, scholar, Black Twitter Is Gold)
- Van Lathan (cultural critic; host, Higher Learning)
- Jamilah Lemieux (cultural critic, writer)
- Wesley Lowery (journalist; author, American Whitelash)
- Ira Madison III (TV writer; host, Keep It!)
- Judnick Mayard (TV writer, producer)
- Jason Parham (senior writer, WIRED)
- April Reign (creative consultant; creator, #OscarsSoWhite)
- God-is Rivera (former global director of Culture and Community, X)
- Amanda Seales (comedian, activist, host "Small Doses" podcast)
- Denver Sean (senior editor, LoveBScott.com)
- Baratunde Thurston (comedian; host, How To Citizen with Baratunde)
- Ashley Weatherspoon (producer; writer, DearYoungQueen.com)
- Raquel Willis (author, activist, media strategist)
- J Wortham (journalist, The New York Times Magazine)

== Episodes ==
=== Series overview ===
Season	Episodes	Originally released	
Season	Episodes	First released	Last released
1	3	May 9, 2024	May 9, 2024

=== Season 1 (2024) ===
No. overall	No. in season	Title	Original release date
1	1	"Chapter One"	May 9, 2024
Overviews early 2000s networking services like MySpace and BlackPlanet, and how the Black community came to Twitter instead of Facebook. The episode highlights prominent guests sharing anecdotes, including the origins of #BlackGirlMagic, President Barack Obama's election in 2008, and the debut of Shonda Rhimes' "Scandal", all of which helped create a robust social collective.
2	2	"Chapter Two"	May 9, 2024
Explains Black Twitter during the #BlackLivesMatter movement and a post-racial America.
3	3	"Chapter Three"	May 9, 2024
Highlights Black Twitter's collective reactions during the COVID-19 pandemic, acquisition of Twitter by Elon Musk, dealing with cancel culture within Black Twitter, Hotep Twitter, and self-awareness of Black Twitter reenforcing structures of oppression.

== Reception ==
When the series was announced and teaser was released on March 8, 2024, Black Twitter had initial negative responses. Some called the series a "big media big-footing, of The Man swooping in to claim a piece of a sacred subculture". Another even questioned the existence of the project because of "who it will serve and benefit most beyond people that don't need to be in our (cultural) business in the first place, including people thirsty to exploit Black Twitter".

The series is described as "an archive, reminding us that we possess the power to demand change; we need only to use our voices to activate it". Moreover, it showcases history that is "challenging mentally and emotionally to relive", while also complementing it with some "humorous Black discourse".

Rendy Jones of RogerEbert.com writes, "the doc functions as a surface-level crash course" and how "the movement deserves more than a superficial appreciation", while "it breezes through topics ripe for deeper conversation".

James Poniewozik, chief TV critic for The New York Times, writes "it's an engagingly specific snapshot of the Twitter era and the social period it overlapped with: a time that was serious even when it was silly, that was fun until it wasn't".
