= Alphonzo Terrell =

American CEO (born 1983)

Alphonzo "Phonz" Terrell
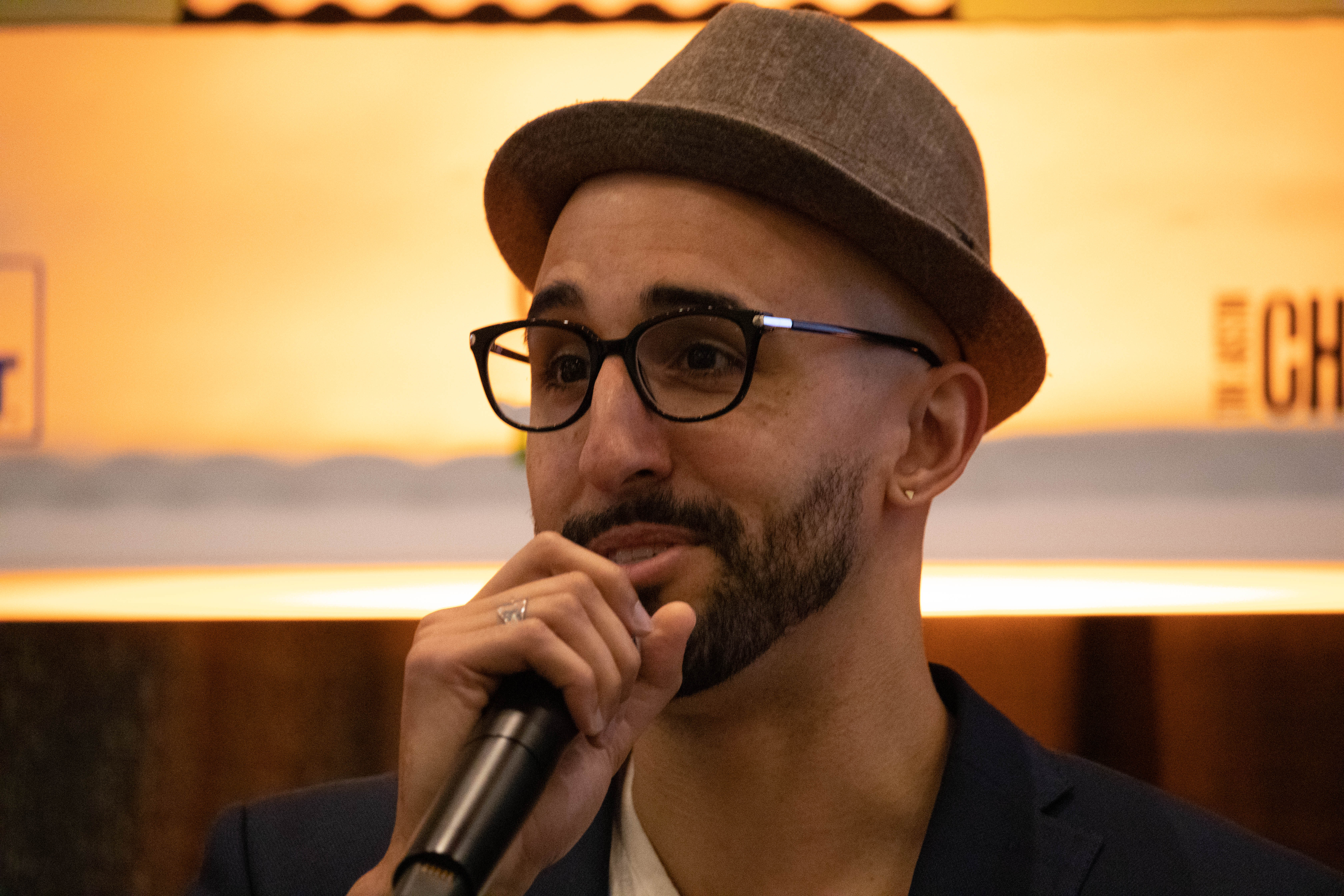
- Alphonzo Terrell @ SXSW 2019
- Born: 1983 (age 41–42)
- Education: Columbia University
- Occupation: Businessperson
- Known for: Co-founder and CEO of Spill
- Awards: Best overall social presence - Brand Webby Winner, 2022; Overall Social Presence 2019; Bronze Pencil 2019

Alphonzo Terrell (born 1983) is a tech entrepreneur, co-founder, and CEO of the social media platform Spill, a Black-owned social platform. Terrell worked in digital and social marketing, including the platform Twitter. Terrell, also known as "Phonz", was let go during Elon Musk’s acquisition of Twitter. After Terrell was let go, he created the social media platform known as "Spill." The platform's team consists of co-founder Devaris Brown, April Reign, and DeRay Mckesson, among others.

== Education ==
Terrell was a student at Columbia University in New York where he was interested in basketball. He gave this up to become the president of a student-founded record label known as CU Records. Their goal as a label was to help promote and distribute young artists at the university. Terrell also facilitated a workshop with Robert Gangi, a director involved in police reform. He co-founded a project with a pro-social start-up named "Rise."

== Career ==
Early in his career, Terrell worked for Showtime and Sony. He was the director of digital and social marketing at HBO, before he transitioned to the social media company Twitter, where he worked as their global social and editorial head. Terrell met the co-founder of Spill Devaris Brown during their orientation at Twitter. He was with Twitter for about three years before being let go by the new owner, Elon Musk.

Terrell and Brown decided to co-found Spill, a social media platform for people of color, and other historically marginalized groups, such as the LGBTQ community. They aimed to create a safe space as many members of Black Twitter, one of the platform’s largest communities, were leaving Twitter. Spill gets its name from the phrase, "Spill The Tea" which often refers to gossip.

Spill now has over 200,000 users and, after just a year, has raised more than $5 million in pre-seed funding. Despite still being in beta testing, Spill has attracted attention from news outlets like CNN, Essence, and GPB.

== Awards and nominations ==
Terrell was a part of the team that won Best overall social presence Brand Webby Winner in 2022, Overall Social Presence in 2019, and the Bronze Pencil in 2019.
