= André Brock =

American media studies scholar

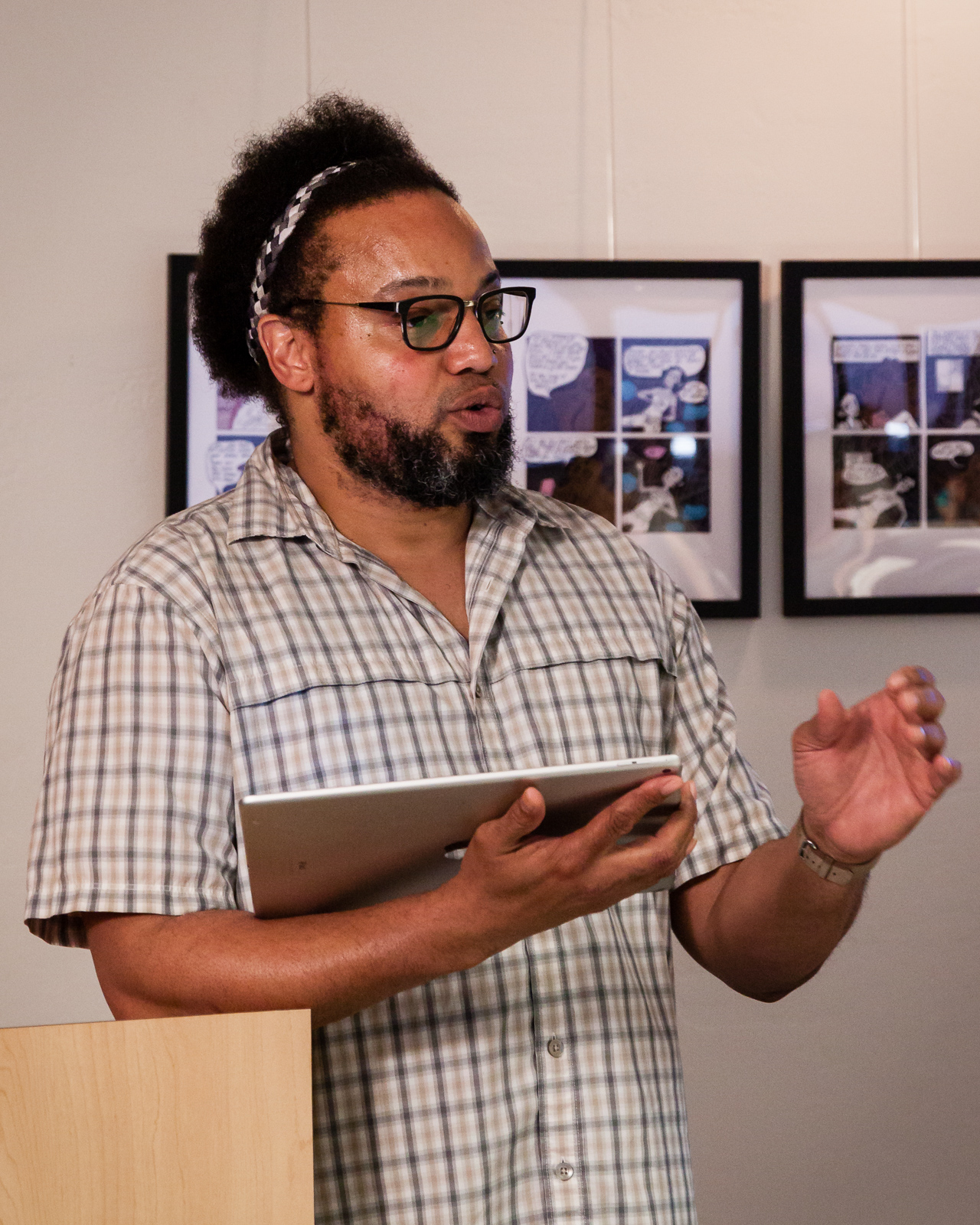
- Brock in 2017
- Born: André Brock Jr.

Academic background
- Education: University of Illinois Urbana-Champaign

Academic work
- Discipline: Media studies
- Institutions: Georgia Tech
- Notable works: Distributed Blackness

André Brock Jr. is an American scholar focusing on Black digital practices and online experiences, including Black Twitter. He is an associate professor of media studies at Georgia Tech.

== Career ==
Brock earned a bachelor's degree from City College of New York, a master's degree in English rhetoric from Carnegie Mellon University, and a Ph.D. in library and information science from the University of Illinois Urbana-Champaign.

Brock was an assistant professor of information science at the University of Iowa from 2007 to 2013. From 2013 to 2018 he taught as an assistant professor at the University of Michigan. In 2018, he became an associate professor of media studies at Georgia Tech. In 2021, he founded the Project on Rhetoric of Equity, Access, Computation, and Humanities (PREACH) Lab at Georgia Tech with a grant from the University of Michigan.

As a race and digital culture scholar, Brock's research has focused particularly on African Americans' use of new media like Twitter. He is an expert on Black Twitter, which has been a focus of his studies since 2012. In an interview for Jason Parham's 2021 Wired series "A People's History of Black Twitter", Brock said of Black Twitter: "Many immigrant communities have a form of signifying. But for some reason, the way Black folk do it on Twitter has really taken off and has really become definitive of what internet culture is." In 2024, he was one of the primary experts for the Hulu docuseries that grew out of the Wired series, titled Black Twitter: A People's History.

=== Distributed Blackness ===
Brock is the author of Distributed Blackness: African American Cybercultures, published in 2020 by New York University Press. He uses a methodological approach proposed in his earlier work, called Critical Technocultural Discourse Analysis (CTDA), which he describes as a "holistic approach to analyzing technology as discourse, practice, and artifact". He also draws on Jean-François Lyotard's libidinal economy to analyze Black technology use. He argues that "Black folk have made the internet a 'Black space' whose contours have become visible through sociality and distributed digital practice while also decentering whiteness as the default internet identity." A main theme of the book is Black joy as it is expressed and experienced in digital spaces.

Francesca Sobande reviewed Distributed Blackness for Convergence, describing it as "significant and detailed" and important to researchers focused on Black cybercultures and philosophy. Kamilles Gentles-Peart gave the book a "recommended" review in Choice, writing that the book is "one corrective to Western pathologizing and to the misconception of Black subjectivity and agency in online spaces". The book earned a starred review in Booklist. Distributed Blackness earned the 2021 Harry Shaw and Katrina Hazzard-Donald Award for Outstanding Work in African-American Popular Culture Studies from the Popular Culture Association, and the 2021 Nancy Baym Annual Book Award from the Association of Internet Researchers.

== Selected works and publications ==
=== Books ===
- Distributed Blackness: African American Cybercultures (2020)

=== Selected academic works ===
- Brock, André; Kvasny, Lynette; Hales, Kayla (2010). "Cultural appropriations of technical capital: Black women, weblogs, and the digital divide". Information, Communication & Society. 13 (7): 1040–1059. doi:10.1080/1369118X.2010.498897. ISSN 1369-118X.
- Brock, André (2011). "'When Keeping it Real Goes Wrong': Resident Evil 5, Racial Representation, and Gamers". Games and Culture. 6 (5): 429–452. doi:10.1177/1555412011402676. ISSN 1555-4120.
- Brock, André (2012). "From the Blackhand Side: Twitter as a Cultural Conversation". Journal of Broadcasting & Electronic Media. 56 (4): 529–549. doi:10.1080/08838151.2012.732147. ISSN 0883-8151.
- Brock, André (2018). "Critical technocultural discourse analysis". New Media & Society. 20 (3): 1012–1030. doi:10.1177/1461444816677532. ISSN 1461-4448.
