= Ashley Boone =

American marketing & distribution executive in the film industry (1938–1994)

Ashley Boone, Jr.
- Born: 1938
- Died: May 1, 1994 (aged 55–56)
- Education: Brandeis University
- Years active: 1964–1993
- Employer(s): United Artists, 20th Century Fox, the Ladd Company, Columbia Pictures, Lorimar Pictures and MGM
- Partner: Mark Bua

Ashley Augustus Boone, Jr. (1938–1994) was an American marketing and distribution executive in the film industry. He was the first black president of a major Hollywood studio, and he played a critical role in the launch of Star Wars, the most successful movie franchise ever.

Since 2012, the African American Film Critics Association has awarded the Ashley Boone Award to outstanding African-American entertainment executives.

== Life ==
In 1960, Boone graduated from Brandeis University, and was later offered a position at United Artists by Brandeis trustee Robert Benjamin.

In 1964, Boone began marketing films, through UA's international brand, where he oversaw releases such as Lilies of the Field (1963), Tom Jones (1963), and multiple James Bond films. Afterwards he had marketing jobs in CBS' film division, Sidney Poitier's production company, and for Motown mogul Berry Gordy, before arriving in 1974 at 20th Century Fox. Boone helped the success of movies such as Best Picture nominee Sounder (1972), wide release pioneer Dirty Mary, Crazy Larry (1974), Young Frankenstein (1974), midnight movie The Rocky Horror Picture Show (1975), and box office hits The Omen (1976) and Alien (1979). He is known for his 1977 campaign to market Star Wars (1977), which became the highest-grossing film of all time upon release.

After the success of Star Wars, Boone was promoted to president of distribution and marketing at Fox becoming the first African American President at a major Hollywood Studio. The position only lasted four months due to the tension created when "Fox chairman and CEO Dennis Stanfill hired Alan Hirschfield, Columbia's former chief, to fill a newly created job of vice chairman and COO — in other words, to become Stanfill's No. 2, effectively demoting Boone."

He later created his own consulting firm, where he worked on campaigns for The Empire Strikes Back and Chariots of Fire, joined Columbia Studios to market The Right Stuff and Ghostbusters, and rejoined Fox president Alan Ladd, Jr. at both Lorimar Television and Metro-Goldwyn-Mayer, where he helped launch Thelma & Louise.

Boone served as a governor for the Academy of Motion Picture Arts and Sciences from 1991 to 1993 with his sister, Cheryl Boone Isaacs.

Boone earned an MBA from Stanford University and taught at the USC School of Cinematic Arts.

In 1993, Boone retired due to pancreatic cancer. He died on May 1, 1994.
