= Black Twitter =

Black social media movement

Black Twitter is an internet community largely consisting of black X (formerly Twitter) users in the United States and other nations, focused on issues of interest to the black community. Feminista Jones described it in Salon as "a collective of active, primarily African-American X users who have created a virtual community proving adept at bringing about a wide range of sociopolitical changes." A similar Black Twitter community arose in South Africa in the early 2010s.

== User base ==
According to a 2013 report by the Pew Research Center, 28 percent of African Americans who had used the Internet also used Twitter, compared to 20 percent of online white, non-Hispanic Americans. By 2018, this gap had shrunk, with 26 percent of all African American adults using Twitter, compared to 24 percent of white adults and 20 percent of Hispanic adults. In addition, in 2013, 11 percent of African-American Twitter users said they used Twitter at least once a day, compared to 3 percent of white users. BlackTwitter.com was launched as a news aggregator reflective of black culture in 2020.

User and social media researcher André Brock dates the first published comments on Black Twitter usage to a 2008 piece by blogger Anil Dash, and a 2009 article by Chris Wilson in The Root describing the viral success of Twitter memes such as #YouKnowYoureBlackWhen and #YouKnowYoureFromQueens that were primarily aimed at Black Twitter users. Brock cites the first reference to a Black Twitter community—as "Late Night Black People Twitter" and "Black People Twitter"—in the November 2009 article "What Were Black People Talking About on Twitter Last Night?" by Choire Sicha, co-founder of current-affairs website The Awl. Sicha described it as "huge, organic and … seemingly seriously nocturnal"—in fact, active around the clock.

Kyra Gaunt, an early adopter who participated in Black Twitter, who also became a social media researcher, shared reactions to black users at the first 140 Characters Conference (#140Conf) that took place on November 17, 2009, at the O2 Indigo in London. Her slide deck offered examples of racist reactions to the topic #ThatsAfrican that started trending in July 2008. She and other users claimed the trending topic was censored by the platform. She and other Black Twitter users began blogging and micro-blogging about Black Twitter identity. The blogging led to buzz-worthy media appearances about Twitter. Social media researcher Sarah Florini prefers to discuss the interactions among this community of users as an "enclave."

=== Reciprocity and community ===
Brown Twitter birds. Shown top left is the original illustration by Alex Eben Meyer that appeared in the Slate article, "How Black People Use Twitter". The remaining birds are parodies by Twitter user @InnyVinny illustrating the diversity of the Black Twitter community. The resulting #browntwitterbird hashtag game went viral, as users adopted or suggested new Twitter birds.

An August 2010 article by Farhad Manjoo in Slate, "How Black People Use Twitter," brought the community to wider attention. Manjoo wrote that young black people appeared to use Twitter in a particular way: "They form tighter clusters on the network—they follow one another more readily, they retweet each other more often, and more of their posts are @-replies—posts directed at other users." Manjoo cited Brendan Meeder of Carnegie Mellon University, who argued that the high level of reciprocity between the many users who initiate hashtags (or "blacktags") leads to a high-density, influential network.

A 2014 dissertation by Meredith Clark explains that users on Black Twitter began to use hashtags as a way to attract members of society with similar ideals to a single conversation in order to interact with each other and feel as though they are engaged in a “safe space”. Clark characterizes the use of Black Twitter as critically important to the group, as the conversation helps “cement the hashtag as a cultural artifact recognizable in the minds of both Black Twitter participants and individuals with no knowledge of the initial discussion”. She stated that hashtags have transitioned from serving as a method of setting up a conversation between separate parties to an underlying reason behind how users outside Black Twitter learn about the thoughts and feelings of African Americans in the present world.

Manjoo's article in Slate drew criticism from American and Africana studies scholar Kimberly C. Ellis. She concluded that large parts of the article had generalized too much, and published a response to it titled "Why 'They' Don't Understand What Black People Do On Twitter." Pointing out the diversity of black people on Twitter, she said, "[I]t's clear that not only Slate but the rest of mainstream America has no real idea who Black people are, no real clue about our humanity, in general [...]. For us, Twitter is an electronic medium that allows enough flexibility for uninhibited and fabricated creativity while exhibiting more of the strengths of social media that allow us to build community. [...] Actually, we talk to each other AND we broadcast a message to the world, hence the popularity of the Trending Topics and Twitter usage, yes?" Ellis said that the most appropriate response she had seen to the Slate article was that by Twitter user @InnyVinny, who made the point that "black people are not a monolith" and then presented a wide array of brown Twitter bird drawings on her blog site to express the diverse range of Black Twitter users; the #browntwitterbird hashtag immediately went viral, as users adopted or suggested new Twitter birds.

According to Shani O. Hilton writing in 2013, the defining characteristic of Black Twitter is that its members "a) are interested in issues of race in the news and pop culture and b) tweet A LOT." She adds that while the community includes thousands of black Twitter users, in fact, "not everyone within Black Twitter is black, and not every black person on Twitter is in Black Twitter". She also notes that the viral reach and focus of Black Twitter's hashtags have transformed it from a mere source of entertainment, and object of outside curiosity, to "a cultural force in its own right ... Now, black folks on Twitter aren't just influencing the conversation online, they're creating it."

Apryl Williams and Doris Domoszlai (2013) similarly state, "There is no single identity or set of characteristics that define Black Twitter. Like all cultural groups, Black Twitter is dynamic, containing a variety of viewpoints and identities. We think of Black Twitter as a social construct created by a self-selecting community of users to describe aspects of black American society through their use of the Twitter platform. Not everyone on Black Twitter is black, and not everyone who is black is represented by Black Twitter."

=== Signifyin' ===
Feminista Jones has argued that Black Twitter's historical cultural roots are the spirituals, or work songs, sung by enslaved people in the United States, when finding a universal means of communication was essential to survival and grassroots organization.

Several writers see Black Twitter interaction as a form of "signifyin'", wordplay involving tropes such as irony and hyperbole. André Brock states that the Black Tweeter is the signifier, while the hashtag is the signifier, sign and signified, "marking ... the concept to be signified, the cultural context within which the tweet should be understood, and the 'call' awaiting a response." He writes: "Tweet-as-signifyin', then, can be understood as a discursive, public performance of Black identity."

Sarah Florini of UW-Madison also interprets Black Twitter within the context of signifyin'. She writes that race is normally "deeply tied to corporeal signifiers"; in the absence of the body, black users display their racial identities through wordplay and other languages that shows knowledge of black culture. Black Twitter has become an important platform for this performance.

Florini notes that the specific construction of Twitter contributes to African Americans' ability to signify on Black Twitter. She contends that "Twitter’s architecture creates participant structures that accommodate the crucial function of the audience during signifyin’". By seeing each other's replies and retweets, the user base can jointly partake in an extended dialogue where each person tries to participate in the signifyin’. In addition, Florini adds that "Twitter mimics another key aspect of how signifyin’ games are traditionally played—speed". Specifically, the retweets and replies are able to be sent so quickly that it replaces the need for the audience members to interact in person.

In addition the practices of signifying create a signal that one is entering a communicative collective space rather than functioning as an individual. Tweets become part of Black Twitter by responding to the calls in the tag. Hashtags embody a performance of blackness through the transmission of racial knowledge into wordplay. Sarah Florini in particular focuses on how an active self-identification of blackness rejects notions of a post-racial society by disrupting the narratives of a color-blind society. This rejection of a post-racial society gets tied into the collective practices of performance by turning narratives such as the Republican National Committee's declaration of Rosa Parks ending racism into a moment of critique and ridicule under the guise of a game. Moments, where the performance of blackness meets social critique, allow for the spaces of activism to be created. The Republican Party later rescinded its statement to acknowledge that racism was not over.

Manjoo referred to the hashtags the black community uses as "blacktags," citing Baratunde Thurston, then of The Onion, who argued that blacktags are a version of the dozens. Also an example of signifyin', this is a game popular with African Americans in which participants outdo each other by throwing insults back and forth ("Yo momma so bowlegged, she look like a bite out of a donut," "Yo momma sent her picture to the lonely hearts club, but they sent it back and said, 'We ain't that lonely!'"). According to Thurston, the brevity of tweets and the instant feedback mean Twitter fits well into the African tradition of call and response.

=== Black Twitter humor ===
Humor as a form of social commentary

Many scholars have highlighted how Black Twitter offers a platform for users to share humorous, yet insightful messages.

More recently, Black Twitter spotlighted the "BBQing While Black", incident during which a white woman called police officers on a black family barbecuing in the park. Oakland police arrived; no one was arrested.

When speaking on CNN about her dissent towards then President Donald Trump, CNN commentator Angela Rye stated "[she] will never claim Trump as her bigot president."

=== Black Twitter and image repair ===
In their 2018 book, Race, Gender & Image Repair Case Studies in the Early 21st Century, Mia Moody-Ramirez and Hazel Cole explored how Black Twitter has been used to repair the image of individuals and corporations using William Benoit's typology of image repair. The popularity of #NiggerNavy provides an example of how social media users used Twitter to call out social injustices. Black Twitter reacted in January 2017 when Yahoo Finance misspelled the word "bigger" with an "n" instead of a "b", in a Twitter link to a story on President-elect Donald Trump's plans to enlarge America's navy, thus unintentionally changing what was meant as a "bigger navy" into a "nigger navy". This is a notable example of an "atomic typo" where a typo is undetected by spell checkers because the typo happens to be a correctly spelled word. The tweet containing a racial slur gained more than 1,000 retweets before being deleted, almost one hour after it was shared. Yahoo Finance published an apology shortly after, saying it was a "mistake" but the Black Twitter community already turned #NiggerNavy into a joke.

==== Black women's experience on Black Twitter ====
Black Twitter is an intersectional space, as Black people have intersecting identities that impact how they engage in spaces. As research shows that college-aged women use social media more than college-aged men, Black college-aged women also use social media more than Black-college aged men. Digital spaces like Twitter have been important spaces for students to resist white supremacy. Dr. Marc Lamont Hill has positioned that Black Twitter, "Is a digital [space] that enable[s] critical pedagogy, political organizing, and both symbolic and material forms of resistance to anti-Black state violence within the United States". It was also mentioned by former CEO Jack Dorsey that Black Twitter is "such a powerful force". Although Black Twitter is used to unite black people in the fight against white supremacy, it is also a space where Black women face disproportionate abuse. A study performed by Amnesty International shows that Black women are the most abused group on the platform. The study concludes that Black women are 84 percent more likely to be targeted than their white counterparts and that they, along with Latinx women, are faced with more abuse on the platform than any other demographic. Twitter’s acquisition by Elon Musk's has led to the Black community fear that blocked accounts used for harassment, abuse, misinformation and violence may be allowed back on the platform due to Musk's differing viewpoints on free speech, stating that he will be "very reluctant to delete things".

With Black women spending a lot of time on social media, their resistance to white supremacy and creating counter-narratives can be seen through hashtags developed like #BlackGirlMagic, #BlackGirlsMatter, etc. "Social media has become a crucial space for discussing, dismantling, and organizing against anti-Black racism for young Black women."

=== Black Twitter exodus ===
Due to Elon Musk's involvement in Trump’s campaign and ownership of the platform, accompanying his changes, many Black users have opted to abandon X. More than 115,000 accounts deactivated on the day after the 2024 election, which was the most dropped accounts in a single day since Musk acquired the platform. Black users, like many others have been intending to exit from the app since 2022. This caused a resurgence in ideation to either find alternatives or join a "Black-owned" social media site similar to Twitter's experience. Many have opted to join Bluesky, considered Threads or the Black-owned social media site Spill.

== Influence ==
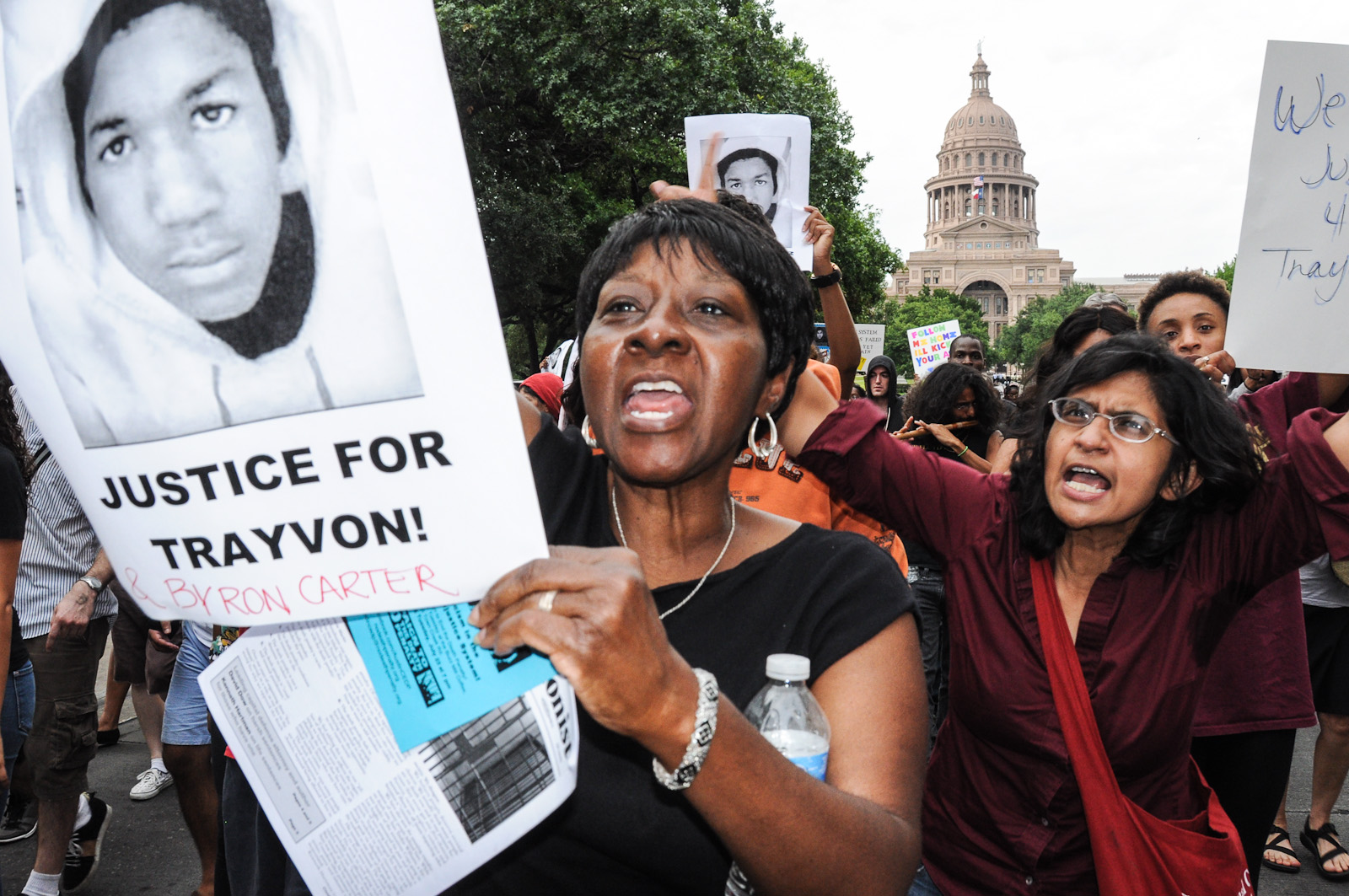
The aftermath of the death of Trayvon Martin brought Black Twitter to wider public attention.

Having been the topic of a 2012 SXSW Interactive panel led by Kimberly Ellis, Black Twitter came to wider public attention in July 2013, when it was credited with having stopped a book deal between a Seattle literary agent and one of the jurors in the trial of George Zimmerman. Zimmerman – who had only been arrested and charged after a large-scale social media campaign including petitions circulated on Twitter that attracted millions of signatures – was controversially acquitted that month of charges stemming from the February 2012 killing of Trayvon Martin, a black teenager in Florida. Black Twitter's swift response to the juror's proposed book, spearheaded by Twitter user Genie Lauren, who launched a change.org petition, resulted in coverage on CNN.

The community was also involved in June 2013 in protesting to companies selling products by Paula Deen, the celebrity chef, after she was accused of racism, reportedly resulting in the loss of millions of dollars' worth of business. A #paulasbestdishes hashtag game started by writer and humorist Tracy Clayton went viral.

In August 2013, outrage on Black Twitter over a Harriet Tubman "sex parody" video Russell Simmons had posted on his Def Comedy Jam website persuaded him to remove the video; he apologized for his error in judgment.

Another example of Black Twitter's influence occurred in May 2018 after Ambien maker Sanofi Aventis responded to Roseanne Barr, who blamed their sedative for the racist tweet she posted, which resulted in the cancellation of her TV show, Roseanne. Barr explained that she was "ambien tweeting" when she compared former Obama adviser Valerie Jarrett to the "spawn" of "Muslim brotherhood & Planet of the Apes." Sanofi responded: "People of all races, religions and nationalities work at Sanofi every day to improve the lives of people around the world. While all pharmaceutical treatments have side effects, racism is not a known side effect of any Sanofi medication." In response to Twitter chatter and criticism, Barr was killed off in Roseanne via an opioid overdose. The show was renamed The Conners.

Demonstrating the continued influence of Black Twitter, a 2019 SXSW Education panel, organized by Kennetta Piper, was selected to address the topic, "We Tried to Tell Y’all: Black Twitter as a Source!" Panelists included Meredith Clark, Feminista Jones, Mia Moody-Ramirez and L. Joy Williams.

In 2022, Black Twitter was credited with prompting national media coverage of the killing of Shanquella Robinson, a young American woman who mysteriously died in Mexico.

=== #SolidarityIsForWhiteWomen ===
The #SolidarityIsForWhiteWomen hashtag was created by black feminist blogger/author Mikki Kendall in response to the Twitter comments of male feminist Hugo Schwyzer, a critique of mainstream feminism as catering to the needs of white women, while the concerns of black feminists are pushed to the side. The hashtag and subsequent conversations have been part of Black Twitter culture. In Kendall's own words: "#SolidarityIsForWhiteWomen started in a moment of frustration. [...] When I launched the hashtag #SolidarityIsForWhiteWomen, I thought it would largely be a discussion between people impacted by the latest bout of problematic behavior from mainstream white feminists. It was intended to be Twitter shorthand for how often feminists of color are told that the racism they feel they experience 'isn't a feminist issue'. The first few tweets reflect the deeply personal impact of such a long-running structural issue."

=== #IfTheyGunnedMeDown ===
After Ferguson, Missouri police officer Darren Wilson fatally shot unarmed resident Michael Brown, an attorney from Jackson, Mississippi named CJ Lawrence tweeted a photo of himself speaking at his commencement at Tougaloo College with former President Bill Clinton laughing in the background and a second photo of himself holding a bottle of Hennessy and a microphone. Lawrence posed the question, "If They Gunned me down which photo would the media use?" The hashtag became the number one trending topic in the world overnight and was ultimately named the most influential hashtag of 2014 by Time magazine. This was a direct criticism of the way Black victims of police violence were portrayed in media, with the assassination of their characters as a result of the choices of images used to depict them. #IfTheyGunnedMeDown spread virally in the course of worldwide social media attention paid to the Ferguson crisis. The hashtag was posted several thousand times in the weeks following Lawrence's initial use of it. #IfTheyGunnedMeDown is now taught in universities around the world. Lawrence, the creator, still lectures on #IfTheyGunnedMeDown and has since established his own media company, Black With No Chaser, to continue the mission of making sure that Black people control their narratives.

=== #MigosSaid ===
The call and response aspects of a game where users work to outdo the other are exemplified in the creation of the blacktag #MigosSaid. Black Twitter engaged in a public display of using oral traditions to critique the hierarchy of pop culture. The movement stemmed from an initial tweet on June 22, 2014, when @Pipe_Tyson tweeted, "Migos best music group since the Beatles." This sparked an online joke where users began to use the hashtag #MigosSaid to examine lyrics of the popular rap group. While the game could widely be seen as a joke it also embodied a critique of popular representations of black artists. The hashtag made in fun was used to offer a counter argument to the view the Beatles and other white popular music figures are more culturally relevant than their black counterparts.

=== #BlackLivesMatter ===
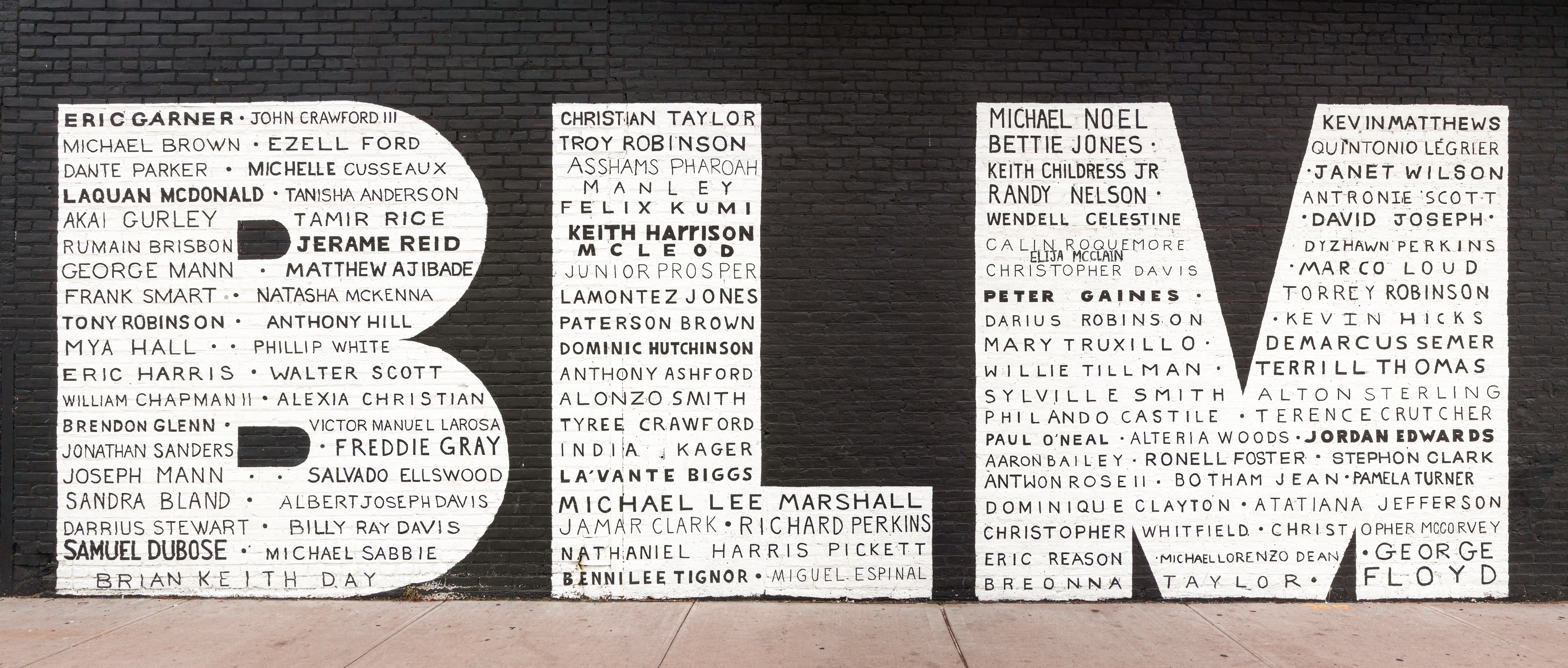
BLM mural

The #BlackLivesMatter hashtag was created in 2013 by activists Alicia Garza, Patrisse Cullors and Opal Tometi. They felt that African Americans received unequal treatment from law enforcement. Alicia Garza describes the hashtag as follows: "Black Lives Matter is an ideological and political intervention in a world where Black lives are systematically and intentionally targeted for demise. It is an affirmation of Black folks’ contributions to this society, our humanity, and our resilience in the face of deadly oppression."

=== #OscarsSoWhite ===
The #OscarsSoWhite hashtag was originally created in 2015 in response to the 87th Academy Awards' lack of diversity amongst the nominees in major categories. The hashtag was used again when the nominations were announced for the 88th Academy Awards the following year. April Reign, activist and former attorney, who is credited with starting the hashtag, tweeted, "It's actually worse than last year. Best Documentary and Best Original Screenplay. That's it. #OscarsSoWhite." In addition, she mentions that none of the African-American cast of Straight Outta Compton were recognized, while the Caucasian screenwriter received nominations.

=== #SayHerName ===
The #SayHerName hashtag was created in February 2015 as part of a gender-inclusive racial justice movement. The movement campaigns for black women in the United States against anti-Black violence and police violence. Gender-specific ways black women are affected by police brutality and anti-Black violence are highlighted in this movement, including the specific impact black queer women and black trans women encounter. The hashtag gained more popularity and the movement gained more momentum following Sandra Bland's death in police custody in July 2015. This hashtag is commonly used with #BlackLivesMatter, reinforcing the intersectionality of the movement.

=== #IfIDieInPoliceCustody ===
#IfIDieInPoliceCustody is another hashtag that started trending after Sandra Bland's death. With the growing tweets following the BLM movement police brutality was one of the major themes that struck the black culture. Unsure as to the exact cause of Sandra Bland death the hashtag started as a result. In the tweets, people ask what you would want people to know about you if you died in police custody.

=== #ICantBreathe ===
The #ICantBreathe hashtag was created after the police killing of Eric Garner and the grand jury's decision to not indict Daniel Pantaleo, the police officer that choked Garner to death, on July 17, 2014. "I can't breathe" were Garner's final words and can be heard in the video footage of the arrest that led to his death. The hashtag trended for days and gained attention beyond Twitter. Basketball players, including LeBron James, wore shirts with the words for warm ups on December 8, 2014. The hashtag saw resurgence in 2020, following the murder of George Floyd and the protests that followed.

=== #HandsUpDontShoot ===
The #HandsUpDontShoot hashtag was created after the police shooting of Michael Brown and the grand jury's decision to not indict Darren Wilson, the white Ferguson police officer that shot Brown, on November 24, 2015. Witnesses claimed that Brown had his hands up and was surrendering when Wilson fatally shot him. However, this information was deemed not credible in the face of conflicting testimonies and impacted the jury's decision. What made this particular shooting unique, was that Michael Brown's deceased body lied in the ground for four hours. Ferguson residents took to Black Twitter to share images of his body, share the story of Michael Brown being killed with his hands up, and ultimately the failure of the state to value his life. As Dr. Marc Lamont Hill puts it, "These efforts, anchored by the hashtags #MichaelBrown, #Ferguson, and #HandsUpDontShoot, transformed Brown’s death from a local event to an international cause." Hands up, don't shoot is a slogan used by the Black Lives Matter movement and was used during protests after the ruling. The slogan was supported by members of the St. Louis Rams football team, who entered the field during a National Football League game holding their hands up. Using the hashtag on Twitter was a form of showing solidarity with those protesting, show opposition to the decision, and bring attention to police brutality. The #HandsUpDontShoot hashtag was immediately satirized with #PantsUpDontLoot when peaceful protests turned into riotous looting and firebombing that same evening.

=== #BlackGirlMagic/#BlackBoyJoy ===
Black Twitter has also been used as a method of praise.

According to Ayanna Harrison, the hashtag #BlackBoyJoy first appeared as a "natural and necessary counterpart to the more established #BlackGirlMagic". The hashtag #BlackBoyJoy appeared following the 2016 Video Music Awards ceremony, after Chance the Rapper tweeted an image of himself on the red carpet using the hashtag.

=== #StayMadAbby ===
In 2015, #StayMadAbby surfaced on Black Twitter as Black students and college graduates rallied against Supreme Court Justice Antonin Scalia after he made comments about their supposed inability to graduate from universities he labeled "too fast". Scalia's comments came in 2015 during oral arguments for the affirmative action case Fisher v. University of Texas. The suit, filed by one-time prospective student Abigail Fisher, alleged that she was denied admission to the University of Texas at Austin because she was white, and that other, less qualified candidates were admitted because of their race.

The hashtag #StayMadAbby took off with hundreds of Black graduates tweeting photos of themselves clad in caps and gowns, as well as statistics pointedly noting that Black students only account for a small share of the UT Austin student body. The hashtag #BeckyWithTheBadGrades also emerged to spotlight Fisher. The hashtag referred both to Fisher and to a lyric from Beyoncé's song "Sorry".

== Reception ==
Jonathan Pitts-Wiley, a former writer for The Root, cautioned in 2010 that Black Twitter was just a slice of contemporary African-American culture. "For people who aren't on the inside," he wrote, "it's sort of an inside look at a slice of the black American modes of thought. I want to be particular about that—it's just a slice of it. Unfortunately, it may be a slice that confirms what many people already think they know about black culture."

Daniella Gibbs Leger, wrote in a 2013 HuffPost Black Voices article that "Black Twitter is a real thing. It is often hilarious (as with the Paula Deen recipes hashtag); sometimes that humor comes with a bit of a sting (see any hashtag related to Don Lemon)." Referring to the controversy over the Tubman video, she concluded, "1. Don't mess with Black Twitter because it will come for you. 2. If you're about to post a really offensive joke, take 10 minutes and really think about it. 3. There are some really funny and clever people out there on Twitter. And 4. See number 1."

== Criticism ==
=== Labeling ===
While Black Twitter is used as a way to communicate within the black community, many people outside and within that community do not understand the need to label it. With regard to this concern, Meredith Clark, a professor at the University of North Texas who studies black online communities, recalls one user's remarks, "Black Twitter is just Twitter".

=== Intersectionality ===
Additional criticism of Black Twitter is the lack of intersectionality. One example is the tweets made after rapper Tyga was pictured with the transgender porn actress Mia Isabella. Alicia Garza, one of the founders of the Black Lives Matter movement, explained the importance of intersectionality and makes it one of the priorities in the movement. She wrote that many people find certain "charismatic black men" more appealing, which leaves "sisters, queers, trans, and disabled [black] folk [to] take up roles in the background."

== South Africa ==
Kenichi Serino wrote in 2013 in The Christian Science Monitor that South Africa was experiencing a similar Black Twitter phenomenon, with black discourse on Twitter becoming increasingly influential. In a country that has 11 official languages, Black Twitter users regularly embedded words from isiZulu, isiXhosa, and Sesotho in their tweets. In August 2016 there were approximately 7.7 million South Africans on Twitter – by August 2017, this grew to about eight million users, with 63.8% of South Africans being online. But according to journalism lecturer Unathi Kondile, black people had taken to Twitter as "a free online platform where black voices can assert themselves and their views without editors or publishers deciding if their views matter."

=== #FeesMustFall ===
#FeesMustFall was the most significant hashtag in South African Black Twitter. It started with a student-led protest movement that began in mid October 2015 in response to an increase in fees at South African universities. The protests also called for higher wages for low earning university staff who worked for private contractors such as cleaning services and campus security and for them to be employed directly by universities.

=== #MenAreTrash ===
The #MenAreTrash hashtag was another prominent topic in 2017 on South African Twitter. Black women took to the social media platform to address numerous issues such as rape, patriarchy and domestic violence.

=== #OperationDudula ===
Trending almost on a daily basis in South Africa is the #OperationDudula hashtag. The hashtag is used to rally people against immigration. According to journalist Pumza Fihlani, the movement behind the hashtag was founded by Nhlanhla "Lux" Dlamini, and became prominent in 2021.

== See also ==
- Afrofuturism
- Blacksky
- History of Twitter
