= Inequality in Hollywood =

The Hollywood Sign in the hills of Los Angeles, California, is an iconic representation of the American film industry as a whole.

Inequality in Hollywood refers to various forms of discrimination and social inequality in the American media industry, including news, television, film, music, agencies, and studios. Inequality has been present to varying degrees since Hollywood emerged as a major center of the American entertainment industry in the early 1900s.

People of different genders, races, and ages have faced discrimination and differences in opportunity. The industry has evolved over time, but efforts continue to highlight these issues. Social movements have emerged to promote diversity and inclusion across the industry.

== Gender inequality ==
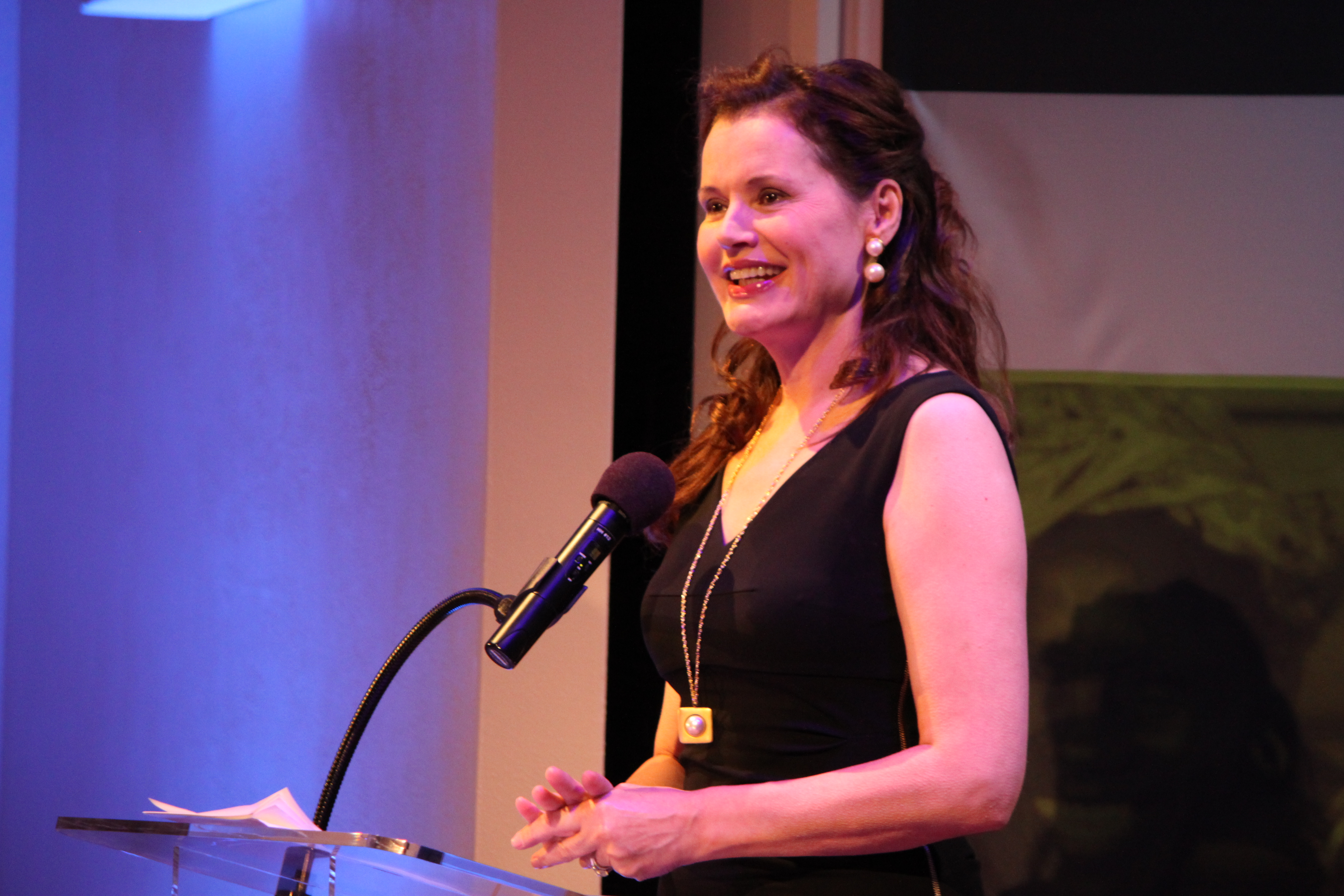
Hollywood actress Geena Davis in a speech at the Millennium Development Goals Countdown event in the Ford Foundation Building in New York, addressing gender roles and issues in film (24 September 2013)

=== Pay gap ===
==== Actors vs. actresses ====
The wage gap between actors and actresses is one example. A 2014 survey conducted by The New York Film Academy found that the top ten male actors collectively made $419 million, compared with roughly $226 million collectively for actresses. A Forbes article in August 2017 listed the 30 highest-paid actors and actresses of that year. The highest-paid actor, Mark Wahlberg, made $68 million, more than 2.5 times the amount earned by the highest-paid actress that year, Emma Stone, who ranked at 15th-highest-paid with $26 million. The fourth-highest-paid actress, Melissa McCarthy, earned $18 million, the same as the 21st-highest-paid actor, Chris Evans. A study from the International Federation of Actors (FIA) found that the number of women with an income under £6,000 is 14% higher than the number of men, while the number of women with an income of £20,000 or higher is 13% lower than the number of men.

The Sony Pictures hack in 2014 revealed that Jennifer Lawrence and Amy Adams were paid less than their male co-stars for the film American Hustle. Each actor in the film received a certain number of points that represented how much they earned from the film. An email from a Columbia Pictures executive stated that, "The current talent deals are: O'Russell: 9%; Cooper: 9%; Bale: 9%; Renner: 9%; Lawrence: 7%; Adams: 7%." Although the two women had been nominated for more Academy Awards than the men combined, Lawrence was originally presented with five points, while Adams was presented with seven. The hack also revealed data which showed that, "Of 6,000 employees, 17 of those employees were raking in $1 million or more, but only one of those $1 million-plus employees is a woman."

In some instances, male co-stars have offered to give up part of their salaries to ensure equal pay. During an interview, Susan Sarandon said that Paul Newman offered to give her part of his salary after learning that she was being paid less than he was. In 2018, Benedict Cumberbatch said that he would not take on a role if his female co-star was not being paid the same rate.

==== Directors ====
A 2017 study found that 7.3% of directors of the year's 100 top-grossing films were women, compared with 4.3% across 1,100 top-grossing films from 2007 to 2017. According to The Guardian, 96% of the directors of 2017's top-grossing films were men.

==== Writers ====
Data from The Writers Guild of America, West, a union for film and television writers in Hollywood, were analyzed by Denise D. Bielby in "Sociologie du Travail." She states that "from 1999 through 2005, the gender gap in earnings increased… with women's earnings declining by 6% (from $53,200 to $50,000) and men's growing by 16% (from $77,500 to $90,000)."

=== Representation and opportunities ===
A New York Film Academy research study found that films with a female director had a 10.6% increase in female characters on screen, while films with a female screenwriter had an 8.7% increase. The same study found that "visual effects, usually the largest department for big feature films, had an average of only 17.5% of women (employees), while music had just 16%, and camera and electrical were, on average, 95% male". Few film directors are women. Among the 250 highest-grossing films of 2016, 7% of directors were female.

Another study by the International Federation of Actors, focusing on employment opportunities, found that around 22% of women felt they had better work opportunities than men. A vast majority of both male and female respondents felt that men continued to have a greater variety of roles available to them, whereas roles for women were more restricted and often decreased sharply around the age of 40.

Inequality in the film industry is also reflected in the types of characters women portray. While men are represented across a number of different genres, women are typically under-represented in genres such as action and science fiction and more commonly represented in romance. The New York Film Academy's 2014 poll cited above also assessed gender differences in revealing clothing on screen. The poll found that while 30.8% of speaking characters are women, 28.8% of those women wore sexually revealing clothing, compared with 7% of male speaking characters.

The Geena Davis Institute on Gender in Media is an organization that advocates for expanding the roles of women in film.

A 2018 IndieWire report stated that Michelle Williams received $80 a day in per diem for reshoots of All The Money In the World, while co-star Mark Wahlberg got $1.5 million from Sony. Despite being represented among studio executives and producers, women in the industry were aware that the other women on stage had been paid less.

=== Social movements surrounding gender inequality ===
==== #MeToo ====
In October 2017, The New York Times published an article about Harvey Weinstein that highlighted accounts of sexual harassment from many of the actresses he had worked with. Following the publication of the story, Alyssa Milano promoted the hashtag #MeToo on Twitter to encourage other victims of sexual harassment to speak up. Several film, television, and media production figures besides Weinstein soon faced allegations of sexual harassment, including news anchor Matt Lauer, comedian Louis C.K., and Disney producer John Lasseter.

The #MeToo hashtag was used more than 19 million times on Twitter between October 15, 2017, after Alyssa Milano promoted the hashtag following allegations against Hollywood executive Harvey Weinstein, through September 30, 2018. Analysis of periods when #MeToo activity was high, Pew Research Center found that 15% of tweets mentioned celebrities or the entertainment industry, while 14% discussed personal stories or narratives about harassment.

==== #TimesUp ====
The Time's Up movement was a response to the #MeToo movement in Hollywood, specifically to the allegations against Weinstein. The movement was organized and funded by Hollywood celebrities, while also establishing legal resources and raising awareness through celebrities wearing black at major Awards shows in 2018. This movement also extends beyond Hollywood and seeks to reach people in workplaces around the world.

==== #AskMoreOfHim ====
This movement was started by men in Hollywood who wanted to show their support for women in the industry by speaking out. It was created in response to the #MeToo movement. The men involved in the movement aim to speak out against sexual harassment when it occurs and hold themselves accountable for promoting greater equality for women in the industry.

== Racial inequality ==
=== History of racial inequality in Hollywood ===
The first films to come out of Hollywood that included non-white characters featured white actors using blackface, brown-face, and yellowface. In the United States, minstrel shows gained popularity in the 1830s and 1840s. These shows cast white actors to portray people of other ethnicities. By the 1940s and 1950s, many white actors and actresses gained prominence after changing their ethnic names to more widely used industry names. This reduced employment opportunities for non-white actors.

Once people of color appeared on Hollywood screens by the early twentieth century, they were often limited to small background roles or required to conform to racial stereotypes to obtain roles. Under restrictive industry regulations such as The Motion Picture Production Code (Hays Code), interracial marriages and relationships could not be portrayed on screen. This restricted actors of color from obtaining lead roles, even when their female counterpart was a character of color, because the female role would typically be portrayed by a white actress in blackface.

The Georgetown Law Journal of Modern Critical Race Perspectives published an article stating that "typically, breakdowns reserve leading roles for white actors, leaving only a small number of remaining roles for non-white actors." A 2006 study by UCLA Chicano Studies stated that "from June 1st to August 31st of that year...only 0.5% to 8.1% of roles were available for actors of color, compared to 69% of roles 'reserved' for white actors. Moreover, only 8.5% of roles did not designate race or ethnicity, pitting white actors against actors of color". Furthermore, "Just over a quarter (25.9% ) of the 3,932 speaking characters evaluated were from underrepresented racial/ethnic groups; [74.1% were White]."

According to the Writers Guild of America's 2016 Hollywood Writer's Report, race is a bigger factor in pay disparity than gender, with minority women having lower earnings even at the top levels. The report also states that white men earned a median of $133,500 in 2014, whereas women earned a median of $118,293 and non-white writers earned a median of $100,649. Although the Guild declined to provide specific data for women of color, Asian writers collectively earned a median of $115,817; black writers earned $99,440, and Latino writers earned $84,200. The median earnings for Native American writers were $152,500, but only five Native American writers were employed in 2014.

=== African-American inequality ===
As Hollywood grew in the early twentieth century, few roles were available for African-American actors. In 1915, the film Birth of a Nation was released and has been described as "the most controversial film ever made in the United States." The film featured white actors in blackface and portrayed the Ku Klux Klan as the saviors of society. The 1927 film The Jazz Singer further demonstrated the industry's use of traditional blackface performance in major studio productions, with white performers hired instead of black actors.

African American performers have received fewer major acting awards. Hattie McDaniel was the first African American to win an Oscar for Best Actress in a Supporting Role, for her performance in the 1939 film Gone with the Wind. Steve McQueen became the first black producer to win the Academy Award for Best Picture, as well as the first black director to direct a Best Picture-winning film for 12 Years a Slave. Only four African American actors have won Oscars for Best Actor in a Leading Role, and Halle Berry is the only black actress to have won an Oscar for Best Actress in a Leading Role. Jordan Peele and Geoffrey Fletcher are the only black men to have won Oscars in the Best Writing categories. In 2010, Fletcher won for Best Adapted Screenplay for Precious; Peele won for Best Original Screenplay for the film Get Out in 2018. There are also differences in budgets and box office earnings between films with white and non-white directors, with films directed by white directors having higher budgets on average.

In 2009, Disney introduced Tiana, its first African American princess, in the film The Princess and the Frog.

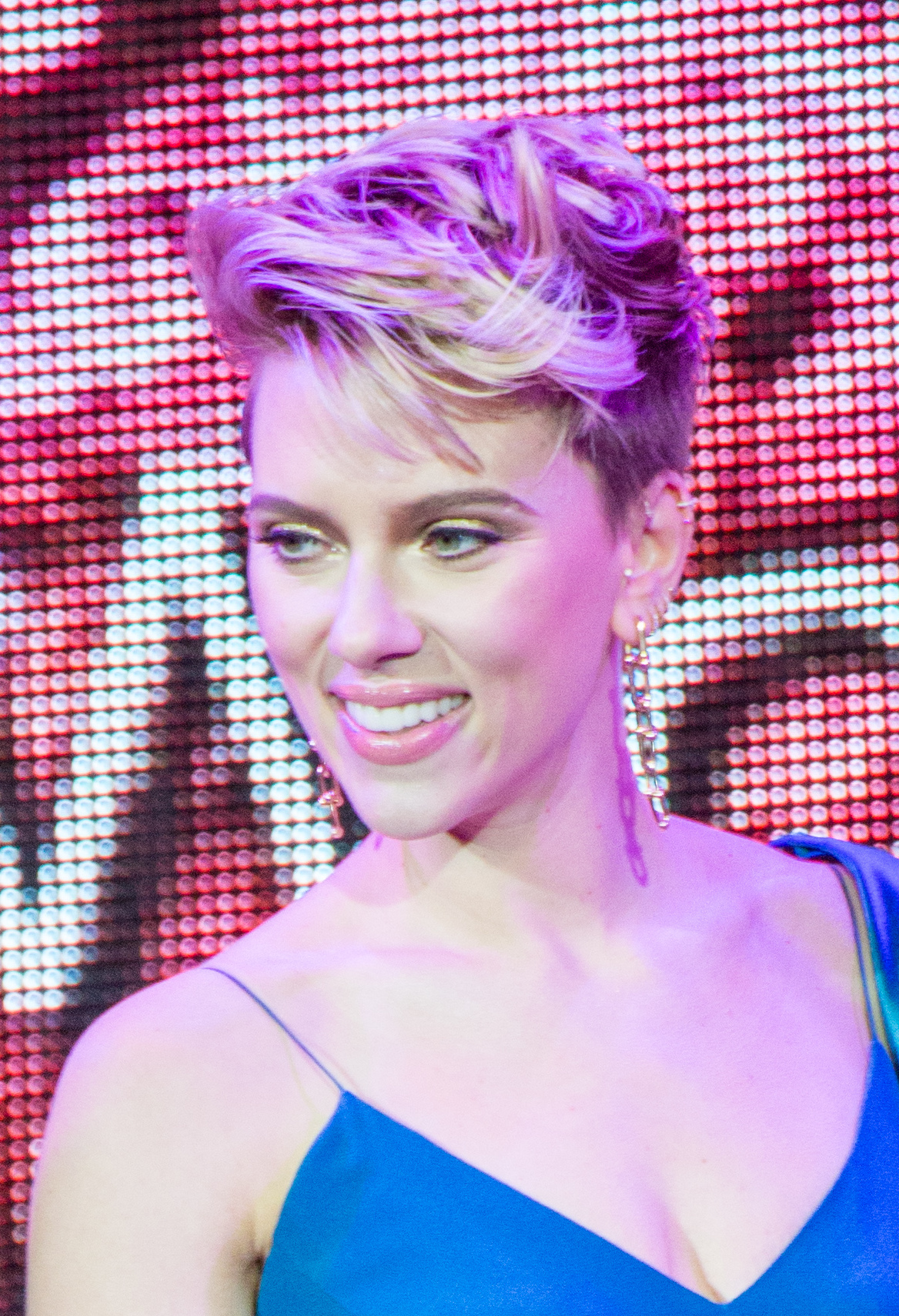
Scarlett Johansson at the world premiere of Ghost in the Shell; she received criticism for portraying a Japanese female protagonist.

More recent quantitative research has documented a substantial long-term increase in Black representation in Hollywood films. This increase, however, has varied with economic conditions. A 2026 study of 2,023 top domestic-grossing U.S. films released between 1980 and 2022 found that Black actors' share of screen time was lower when credit conditions tightened and higher when GDP grew. Greater screen time for Black actors was also associated with a marginally higher domestic gross but a lower international revenue share and worldwide gross.

=== Asian inequality ===
There have been many instances in which white actors were cast in place of Asian actors. In the Marvel film Doctor Strange, Tilda Swinton, a white actress, was cast as the Ancient One, a character presented as a Tibetan male mystic in the comics. Scarlett Johansson also received criticism after playing the cyborg Motoko Kusanagi in the adaptation of the Japanese anime film Ghost in the Shell.

Discrimination against Asian Americans has also been alleged in notable films and television shows such as Kung Fu, in which leading actor David Carradine played a half-American, half-Chinese man. There have also been reports of instances in which the exclusion of Asian people was considered acceptable in Hollywood. Asian characters accounted for 5.7% of characters in Hollywood. Of the top 100 films from 2015, 70 had no female Asian actors in their casts, and 49 had no Asian American actors at all. In addition, Asian characters accounted for 3%–4% of roles in scripted broadcast and cable shows during the 2014–15 season. Several notable celebrities have spoken about the issue. Michelle Yeoh recalled that someone said, "If we cast an African-American lead, there's no way we can cast you because we can't have two minorities". Jackie Chan also stated in an interview with Steve Harvey that, "For the last 20 years I'm looking for some other things, but in the U.S it's difficult. Always police from Hong Kong, police from China". Constance Wu reflected on the importance of Crazy Rich Asians, described as the first Hollywood studio film centered on an Asian American character's story in over 25 years: "Our amazing director Jon M. Chu says…this is more than a movie, it's a movement".

A wage gap has also been reported between white actors and actors of color, as seen in the potential reboot of Hawaii Five-0, where actors Daniel Dae Kim and Grace Park left the series after their contracts offered 10% to 15% less pay than those of their white co-stars.

=== Latino inequality ===
According to Nancy Wang Yuen in her book Reel Inequality: Hollywood Actors and Racism, the Latino population of the United States is not reflected in its representation within Hollywood. There is a substantial difference between their share of the U.S. population and their representation in major motion pictures and television programs. Although Hispanics make up 17% of the total population and were the largest non-white population in the United States, their representation in the industry was lower. Latina and Latino actors were underrepresented in film and television in 2013. Specifically, Latina and Latino actors accounted for 5% of speaking roles in film, 3% of regular roles in cable television, and 2% of regular roles in broadcast television. Latinas and Latinos were underrepresented by a factor of more than eight to one in broadcast television. In 2014–2015, Latina and Latino actors played 5.8% of all speaking and named characters in film, television, and streaming services. Chris Rock wrote, "But forget whether Hollywood is black enough. A better question is: Is Hollywood Mexican enough? You're in L.A, you've got to try not to hire Mexicans."

In 2015, Gina Rodriguez became the second Latina actor to win a Golden Globe Award for lead actress for Jane the Virgin. In her acceptance speech, Rodriguez said that her win "represents a culture that wants to see themselves as heroes." Latinas and Latinos remained underrepresented relative to their share of the population.

Blanca Valdez, who runs a Latina/o casting agency in Los Angeles, said that "Latinas/os have a difficult time auditioning for roles unless the call specifically asks for "diversity" or "multi-ethnic"; in any case, most are secondary roles, such as a neighbor or a bank teller."

Puerto Rican American actor Gina Rodriguez said, "I want Latinas to look at the TV and get confirmation that, yes, we are the doctors, the lawyers, the investment bankers—we encompass every facet of life. And the reason that's important is because little kids look at the screen, as we did when we were growing up, and wonder, where do I fit in? And when you see that you fit in everywhere, you know anything is possible."

=== Racial differences in film criticism ===
Research has also examined racial differences in the critical reception of films. A 2025 study found that film critics' ratings tended to decrease as the proportion of Black cast members increased, but this association was weaker when the critic was Black. The study also found that as Black cast representation increased, critic ratings diverged more from audience ratings and box-office outcomes, with this divergence reduced when critics were Black.

=== Social movements surrounding racial inequality ===
==== #OscarsSoWhite ====
The #OscarsSoWhite movement began in 2015 in response to the 88th Academy Awards, with calls for greater racial diversity at the Academy Awards, and later prompted discussion of racial representation across the media industry. The Oscar nominations faced criticism because only one nominee in the main categories was not Caucasian. The academy received criticism from online communities, including on Twitter, as well as from Hollywood celebrities. The hashtag has prompted changes in Academy membership, casting decisions, and the diversity of behind-the-scenes staff. In a research article, Caty Chattoo noted that Academy membership was 92% white and 75% male in 2016, before changes were made in response to calls for greater racial diversity. In 2017, the membership was 41% people of color and 46% female.

== Age inequality ==
Ageism is discrimination based on age. Historically, female actresses have often faced more pressure from casting directors regarding their age than their male counterparts. Young women have often been cast opposite significantly older men. In the 1942 film Casablanca, actress Ingrid Bergman, 27, played opposite Humphrey Bogart, who was 16 years older than her.

The FIA found that 63.8% of women in the performance industry and 51.2% of men had careers lasting between 11 and 15 years. This 12.6 percentage-point difference indicates a higher proportion of women whose careers ended within that period. A study suggests that gender participation in the film industry is highly correlated with audience expectations of characters in preferred genres. Because these character types have remained generally consistent over time, audience preferences have focused on certain combinations of gender and age. This pattern has applied to age disparities affecting both genders. Although there are fewer roles for women as their age increases, there are also fewer roles for young male actors. These roles are often stereotyped based on age. Criticism of age-based typecasting has come from many sources, including celebrities. At the 2006 Venice Film Festival, actress Meryl Streep remarked: "What films have you seen lately with serious roles for 50-year-old women in the lead? These are roles they write for women my age, usually they are sort of gorgons or dragons or in some way grotesque."

A study published in the Journal of Management Inquiry found a correlation between age, gender, and pay. The study showed that "Average earnings per film of female movie stars increase until the age of 34, but decrease rapidly after that. For male movie stars, average earnings per film are highest when they are 51 years of age."

== Reception of movements in Hollywood ==
After the #OscarsSoWhite movement, the Academy set goals to change the composition of its membership by 2020. The first goal was to double the number of women and people from underrepresented groups among its members. As of 2019, about 49% of voters at the 91st Academy Awards were women,[54] while 38% were non-white.

Many actors and actresses have sought to diversify the industry through their projects. Black Panther became Marvel's highest-grossing solo superhero film at the time, setting several box-office records. Other films cited as examples of diversity include Crazy Rich Asians, Hidden Figures, Get Out, Love, Simon, Moonlight, and Wonder Woman.

Television programming has also been affected by social movements. This is Us became the highest-rated television drama series in 2017 and featured a diverse cast. Grey's Anatomy is another example of a television drama series cited as an example of diversity. It is the longest-running scripted primetime show to air on ABC, and was one of the network's highest-rated shows during that period.

Efforts to reduce the gender pay gap have also been reported. Emma Stone reported that her male co-stars had volunteered to reduce their salaries because they believed they should be paid equally.

Entertainment industry figures have made efforts to promote greater diversity in films. Producer Jordan Peele expressed support for greater diversity in Hollywood, saying that he did not see himself casting a white male as the lead of any of his future films. The Evolve Entertainment Fund was created in January 2018 to help people from underserved communities find work in the entertainment industry.

Academy Aperture 2025 is a diversity standard for Best Picture nominees. It was created by the Academy of Motion Picture Arts and Sciences and took effect in 2024. Deadline Hollywood described it as a "plan to require that Best Picture contenders meet at least two of four inclusion standards aimed at increasing screen depictions or employment of underrepresented groups — women, specified racial and ethnic groups, LGBTQ+ individuals, people with cognitive and physical disabilities, and those hard of hearing."
