= Brandon "Jinx" Jenkins =

American multimedia creative

- Occupations: Journalist; podcaster; TV host; writer; photographer; DJ
- Known for: Mogul
- Website: www.brandon-jinx.com

Brandon "Jinx" Jenkins is an American journalist, podcast host, TV host, writer, photographer, and DJ.

Jenkins is an alum of Morehouse College and the host of Spotify and Gimlet's Mogul and the Ringer's No Skips.

In 2023, Jenkins collaborated with Nike to create a new Terminator High sneaker to represent Morehouse College.

In 2024, Jenkins starred in Black Twitter: A People's History.
