= Meredith Clark =

American scholar

Meredith D. Clark
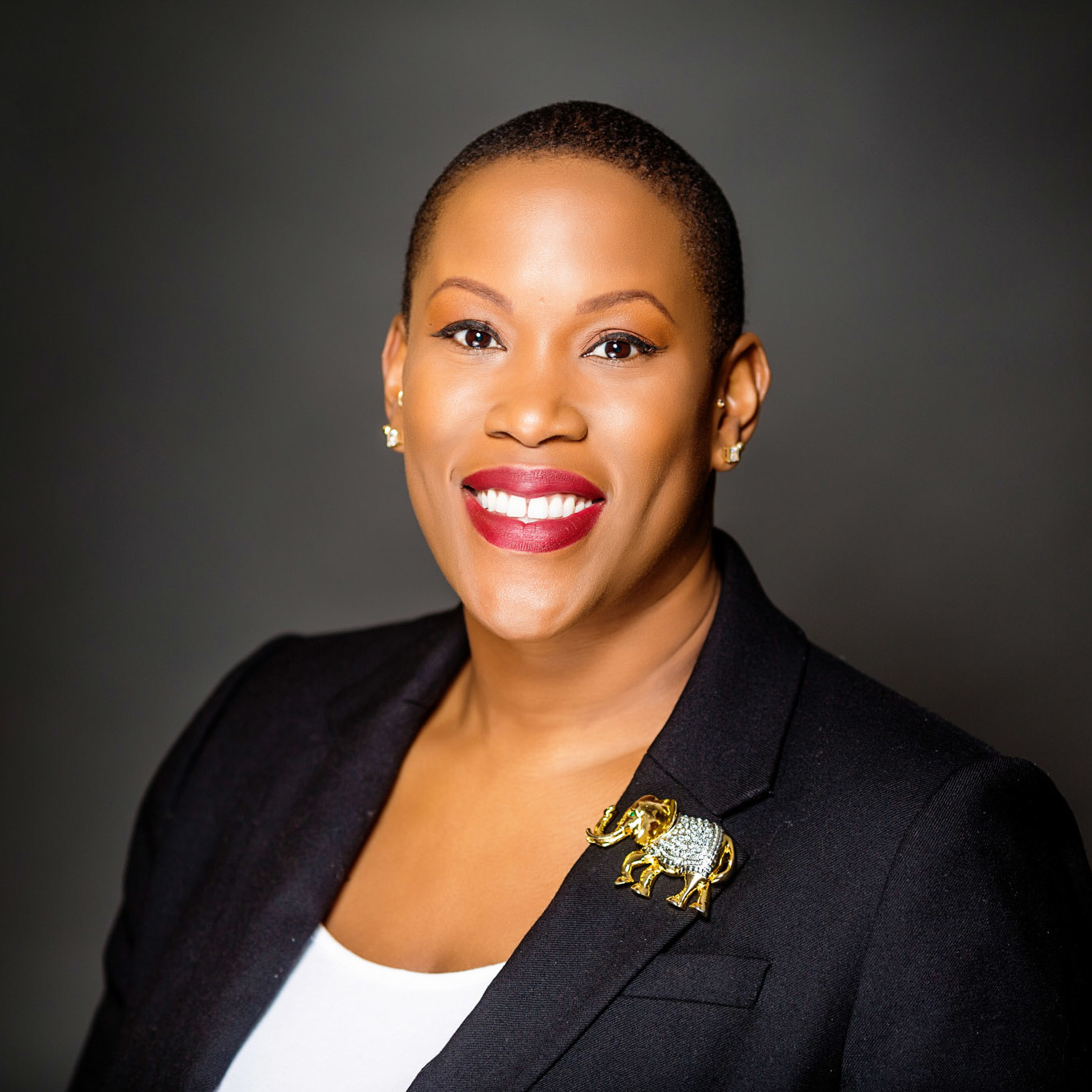
- Clark in 2018
- Born: St. Louis, Missouri, US

Academic background
- Education: Florida A&M University; University of North Carolina at Chapel Hill
- Thesis: To Tweet Our Own Cause: A Mixed-Methods Study of the Online Phenomenon "Black Twitter" (2014)

Academic work
- Discipline: Media studies, Mass communication
- Institutions: University of Virginia
- Main interests: Black Twitter, Cancel culture, Systemic racism in the US news media

Meredith D. Clark is an American journalist and scholar.

She was named by The Root to their 2015 list of 100 most influential Black Americans after her Ph.D. dissertation, To Tweet Our Own Cause: A Mixed-Methods Study of the Online Phenomenon "Black Twitter", won a Top Dissertation award from the Association for Education in Journalism and Mass Communication.

According to The Root, the dissertation was one of the first analyses of Black Twitter by an academic researcher. NPR called her "the go-to person about Black Twitter".

== Early life and education ==
Clark was born to John T. Clark and Dr. Bonnie Mitchell-Clark and raised in Lexington, Kentucky.

Clark attended Florida Agricultural & Mechanical University, earning a bachelor's degree in political science in 2002 and a master's degree in journalism in 2006. She attended the University of North Carolina at Chapel Hill and earned a Ph.D. in mass communication in 2014. Clark's dissertation for her Ph.D. was titled To Tweet Our Own Cause: A Mixed-Methods Study of the Online Phenomenon "Black Twitter". It won a Top Dissertation award from the Association for Education in Journalism and Mass Communication.

== Career ==
Clark's research interests include Black Twitter, cancel culture, and systemic racism in the US news media.

Prior to earning her Ph.D., Clark worked as a journalist for the Capital Outlook, the Tallahassee Democrat, the Austin American-Statesman, and the News & Observer. She wrote a column on diversity at the Poynter Institute's website and was a contributor to USA Today.

According to The Root, Clark's Ph.D. dissertation was one of the first analyses of Black Twitter by an academic researcher. NPR called her "the go-to person about Black Twitter".

After earning her Ph.D., Clark became an assistant professor at the Mayborn School of Journalism at the University of North Texas.

She is an assistant professor of Media Studies at the University of Virginia. She is a faculty fellow with the Data & Society Research Institute, an advisory board member for the Center for Critical Race and Digital Studies at New York University, an advisory board member for Project Information Literacy at Harvard University, and a faculty affiliate of the Center on Digital Culture and Society at the University of Pennsylvania.

She received a grant of $1.2 million from the Andrew W. Mellon Foundation to research African-American social media.

As of 2021 she is an associate professor at Northeastern University.

In July 2024 Clark was hired by alma mater The UNC Hussman School of Journalism and Media as an associate professor of race and political communication.

== Personal life ==
Clark is married to Willie A. Green III The couple live in Charlottesville, Virginia.

== See also ==
- Public sphere
