= April Reign =

American media strategist and diversity & inclusion advocate

April Reign is a media strategist and advocate for diversity and inclusion, known for creating the movement #OscarsSoWhite. She is credited with starting "the hashtag that changed the Oscars", a movement that prompted the Academy of Motion Picture Arts and Sciences to diversify its membership.

== Early life and education ==
Reign was born in Newark, New Jersey. Her father was a physician's assistant in the military and her family moved around when she was a child, with Reign attending high school in Texas, Louisiana, and Georgia. Reign attended the University of Texas for both college and law school.

== Career ==
Reign worked as a campaign finance lawyer for 15 years. In 2014, she resigned from the FEC for violating the Hatch Act. She is currently the CEO of Reignstorm Ventures, where she advocates for the representation of marginalized communities in all areas of the arts and tech. In 2019, Reign was named as an equity advisor to cosmetics retailer Sephora, working with them to eliminate racial bias in stores. In 2020 Reign partnered with Overture Global to create a new digital content studio called Ensemble, aimed at creating content by and for people of color.

== #OscarsSoWhite ==
Reign created the Twitter hashtag #OscarsSoWhite on January 15, 2015 to call attention to inequality in Hollywood and the lack of representation of people of color in the 87th Academy Awards nominations. Reign said this movement was intended to draw attention to how films get made, rather than particular actors: “It’s not about saying who is snubbed and who should have been nominated, it’s about opening the discussion more on how the decisions were made, who was cast and who tells the story behind the camera.”

The hashtag returned after nominations were announced on January 14, 2016, to protest the second year in a row that no actors of color were nominated in the 88th Academy Awards and gained wide attention in the media. In response to the furor sparked by the #OscarsSoWhite hashtag, the president of the Academy, Cheryl Boone Isaacs released a statement promising to take "dramatic steps to alter the makeup of our membership." As a result, the Academy voted unanimously on January 21, 2016, to make a variety of changes to its membership and governance policies with the goal of doubling the number of women and underrepresented groups by 2020. Reign said in 2016 that while the Academy was moving in the right direction, its membership remained overwhelmingly male and white, and that she would continue her fight "until there is a wealth of films that showcase the nuance and complexity of all marginalized communities, whether it is based on sexual orientation, disability, race, ethnicity, gender identity, or First Nation status."

Despite the changes promised in 2016, the 92nd Academy Awards once again showed a lack of diversity. Reign said she wasn't surprised by the lack of nominations for diverse actors in 2020: "Despite the Academy's commitment to doubling the number of people of color and doubling the number of women within its membership ranks by this year, 2020, the Academy is still 84 per cent white and 68 per cent male." Reign remains committed to the movement, traveling globally to connect with a wider audience to encourage people to become active advocates for disadvantaged groups. Despite her commitment to improving diversity in Hollywood, Reign says no one from the Academy has ever spoken to her about the movement she started or asked for her help making structural changes.
