= OscarsSoWhite =

Hashtag

#OscarsSoWhite is a hashtag created by April Reign in January 2015 in response to the nominations for the 87th Academy Awards, in which all 20 acting nominees were white. The hashtag received broader national attention in 2016 after the nominations for the 88th Academy Awards again featured only white acting nominees, prompting renewed criticism of the lack of diversity in the film industry.

== Background ==
April Reign introduced the hashtag on Twitter on January 15, 2015, the day the 87th Academy Awards nominations were announced. While the hashtag later became widely known, one case study notes that it first came to worldwide prominence in 2016.

On January 14, 2016, nominations for the 88th Academy Awards were announced. For the second consecutive year, all 20 acting nominees were white. The nominations drew widespread criticism and renewed attention to the hashtag.

== Boycott and industry response ==
Several prominent figures, including Spike Lee and Jada Pinkett Smith, announced that they would not attend the ceremony.

Actor George Clooney also criticized the lack of diversity in the film industry, saying Hollywood was "moving in the wrong direction" on diversity.

In response, Cheryl Boone Isaacs, then president of the Academy of Motion Picture Arts and Sciences, announced measures intended to increase diversity within the organization. The Academy pledged to double female and minority membership by 2020.

== Outcomes ==
By 2019, the Academy's membership was reported to be 32 percent women and 16 percent people of color, up from 25 percent and 8 percent respectively in 2015. A 2023 analysis based on data from the USC Annenberg Inclusion Initiative found that the proportion of Oscar nominees from underrepresented racial or ethnic groups increased from 8 percent in 2008–2015 to 17 percent in 2016–2023.

Retrospective coverage has described the hashtag as having grown into a broader movement for representation in Hollywood.

Scholars and media analysts have cited #OscarsSoWhite as an example of hashtag activism producing institutional change in the entertainment industry.

== See also ==
- Academy of Motion Picture Arts and Sciences
- Cheryl Boone Isaacs
- April Reign
