= Feminista Jones =

African American feminist writer

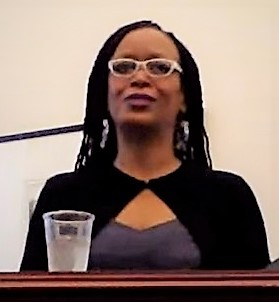
- Jones speaks at Widener University in 2015
- Born: Michelle Taylor; April 6, 1979 (age 47); New York City, U.S.
- Education: University of Pennsylvania (BA); Hunter College (MSW); Temple University (PhD)
- Occupations: Social worker, author, activist
- Notable work: Reclaiming Our Space: How Black Feminism is Changing the World from the Tweets to the Streets
- Website: feministajones.com

Feminista Jones (born Michelle Taylor; April 6, 1979) is an American social worker, author, and activist known for her work on Black feminism. She is a freelance writer for national newspapers and magazines, a podcaster, book author, and social media influencer.

== Career ==
Jones is an alumna of the University of Pennsylvania, and obtained an MSW from Hunter College and a PhD from Temple University.

In 2019, Jones authored Reclaiming Our Space: How Black Feminism is Changing the World from the Tweets to the Streets. In 2020, she founded the Sankofa Summer School, "a virtual Afrocentric community school for students and adults aged 14+".

== Activism ==
In 2013, Jones was selected as a United Nations Foundation Fellow for her social media influence.

In 2014, Jones launched a global anti-street harassment campaign (#YouOKSis) after she tweeted about her own experience intervening in an incident of street harassment in New York. Another user, Mia McKenzie, suggested turning the phrase she had used to check in with the woman—"You OK, sis"—into a hashtag campaign designed to raise awareness and encourage people to ask victims of harassment if they need help. Hundreds of people began using the hashtag to report street harassment.

The same year, Jones launched the National Moment of Silence protesting police brutality (#NMOS14), which received international media attention. #NMOS14 was used to organize national vigils after the death of Michael Brown. She was named one of the SheKnows/BlogHer 2015 "Voices of the Year" in their Impact category for her work with #NMOS14.

Jones was a featured speaker at the January 21, 2017, Philadelphia Women's March, where she primarily discussed the difference between allies and co-conspirators.

== Other work ==
In 2015, Jones co-founded and served as general director of the Women's Freedom Conference, the first all-digital conference organized by and featuring exclusively women of color. Jones has written for the Washington Post, Salon, Time, and Ebony. She has also been regularly featured on Huffington Post Live, has appeared on the Dr. Oz Show and the Exhale Show, and her work has appeared on C-SPAN (2014) and MSNBC (2014). Jones also advocates for young children as well as the homeless and those with psychiatric disabilities.

Jones wrote an article for The Washington Post on May 14, 2015, titled, "Keep Harriet Tubman—and all women—off the $20 bill." She argued it is wrong to place Black women on money, especially Harriet Tubman, due to the historic lack of access to wealth by women and especially women of color. Jones contended that placing Tubman on the $20 bill is counterproductive because "Her legacy is rooted in resisting the foundation of American capitalism."

== Reclaiming Our Space ==
In 2019, Jones published Reclaiming Our Space: How Black Feminism is Changing the World from the Tweets to the Streets.

Publishers Weekly wrote in its review that Jones "astutely analyses the nuances of black female identity." Kirkus Reviews described the book as "[s]harp and provocative, the narrative is most powerful in its implication that, unless born to privilege, all Americans, regardless of race or gender, now 'feel something akin to what Black people... have always experienced.' Understanding black (female) struggles are therefore critical for everyone." The book additionally explores features of Black feminist social action, such as the use of "traditional African-rooted call and response" on Twitter.

== Works ==
=== Novel ===
- Jones, Feminista (2014). Push the Button. CreateSpace. ISBN 978-1502967978.

=== Poetry ===
- Jones, Feminista (2017). The Secret of Sugar Water. CreateSpace. ISBN 9781973342472.

=== Nonfiction ===
- Jones, Feminista (2019). Reclaiming Our Space: How Black Feminism is Changing the World from the Tweets to the Streets. Beacon Press. ISBN 9780807055373.

== Personal life ==
Jones was born and raised in New York City. Jones identifies as pansexual. She is divorced and has one son.

== Accolades ==
- "Black Weblog Award" for Outstanding Online Activism (2014)
- The Root, Top 100 Black Social Influencers (2014)
- She Knows/Blog Her, "Voices of the Year" (2015)
- Philadelphia magazine, "The 100 Most Influential Philadelphians" (2018)
