= Cheryl Boone Isaacs =

American film and PR executive (born 1949)

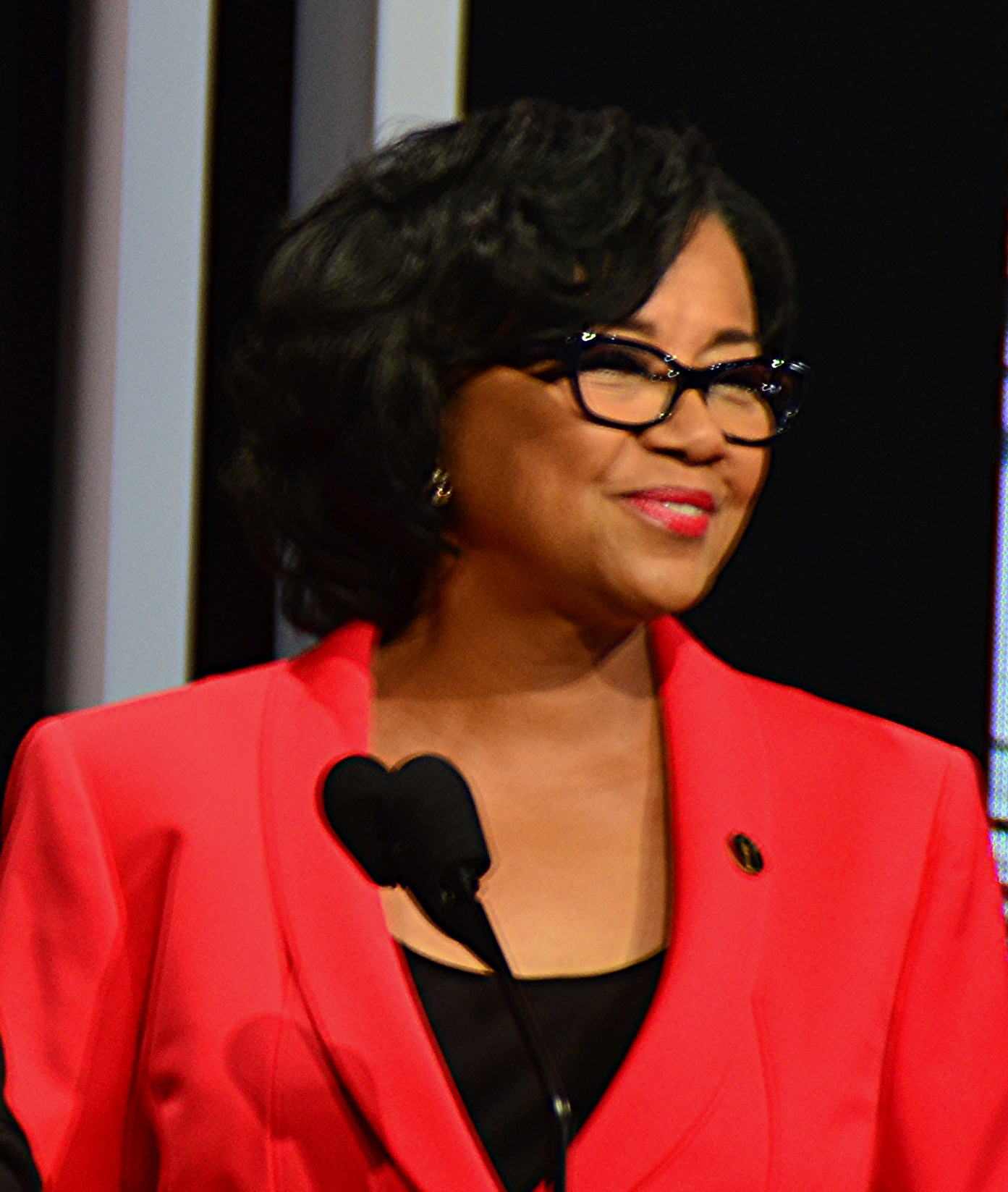
- Boone Isaacs in 2015 at the announcement of nominees for the 87th Academy Awards
- Born: Cheryl Boone; 1949 (age 76–77); Springfield, Massachusetts, U.S.
- Education: Whittier College
- Occupation: Public relations executive
- Years active: 1977–present
- Title: President, Academy of Motion Picture Arts and Sciences
- Term: 4 years
- Predecessor: Hawk Koch
- Successor: John Bailey
- Spouse: Stanley Isaacs (m. 1982)
- Children: 1

Cheryl Boone Isaacs (born 1949) is an American film marketing and public relations executive. She represented the Public Relations Branch of the Academy of Motion Picture Arts and Sciences (AMPAS), known for its annual Academy Awards (Oscars), on the AMPAS Board of Governors for 21 years, until 2013. On July 30, 2013 she was elected as the 35th president of AMPAS and on August 11, 2015 she was re-elected. Boone Isaacs was the first African American to hold this office, and the third woman (after Bette Davis and Fay Kanin). On November 16, 2021, it was announced that Boone Isaacs would serve as Founding Director of the Sidney Poitier New American Film School at Arizona State University's Herberger Institute for Design and the Arts, effective January 1, 2022.

== Early life ==
Boone Isaacs was born in Springfield, Massachusetts, to father, postal worker Ashley Boone, Sr., and a homemaker mother. Her family was middle class and she grew up near Springfield College until her family moved to the Sixteen Acres neighborhood of Springfield. She is the youngest of four children, with two older brothers: Ashley Jr. and Richard; and an older sister, Velma.

In 1967 Boone Isaacs graduated from Springfield Central High School, known at that time as Classical High School. In 1971, she graduated from Whittier College with a degree in political science. During college she spent time in a study abroad program in Copenhagen, Denmark.

Boone Isaacs married Stanley Isaacs who is of English-Jewish descent. They live and work in the greater Los Angeles area.

== Career ==
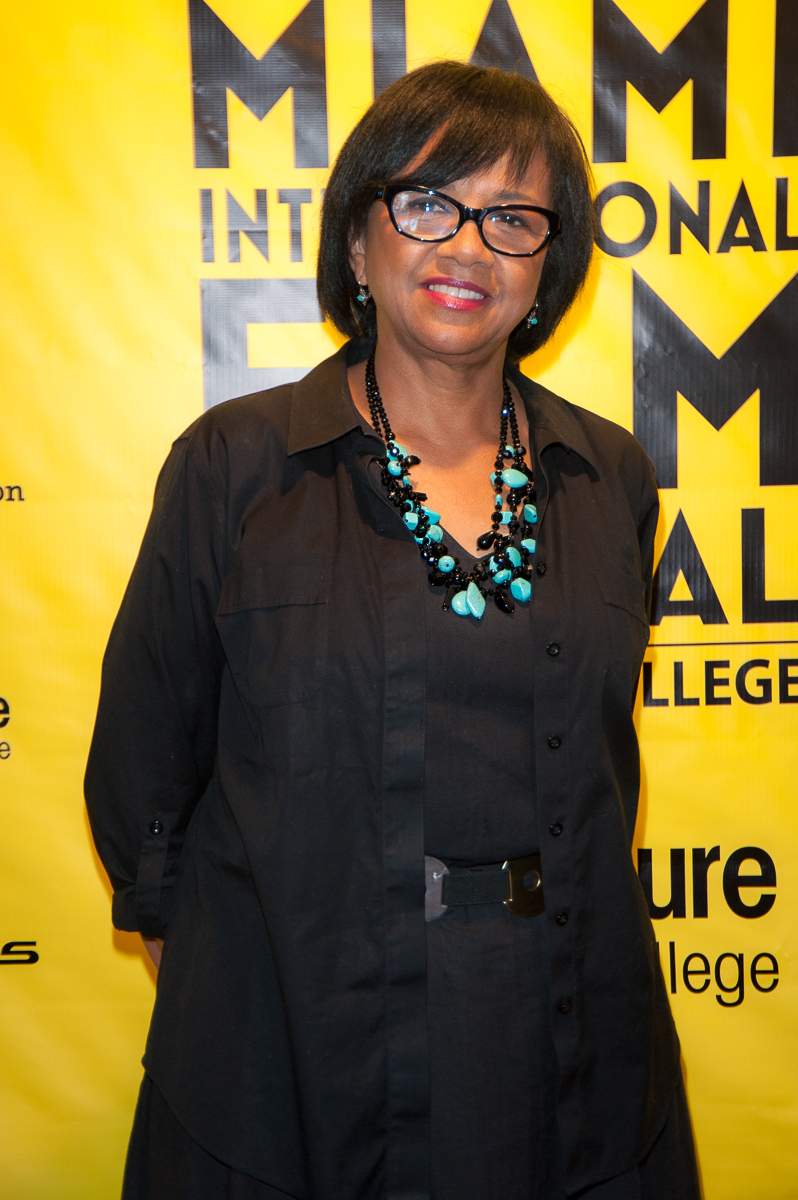
Cheryl Boone Isaacs at the Miami Film Festival

After college, Boone Isaacs worked as a flight attendant for Pan Am based out of San Francisco. At the age of 25, she ended up following her older brother Ashley Boone, Jr. who worked as an executive, to Hollywood.

=== Publicity work ===
In 1977, Boone Isaacs began working in publicity at Columbia Pictures. Her first job was publicizing the Steven Spielberg film Close Encounters of the Third Kind.

She then worked at Milton Goldstein's Melvin Simon Productions, working on publicity for The Stunt Man, Love at First Bite and Porkys, eventually becoming Vice President, Worldwide Advertising and Publicity. Boone Isaacs was then Director of Advertising and Publicity for The Ladd Company and worked to promote films like The Right Stuff and Once Upon a Time in America.

In 1984, she was Director, Publicity and Promotion, West Coast, eventually becoming the worldwide publicity director for Paramount Pictures, a position she held until 1997. As Paramount's Executive Vice President of Worldwide Publicity, she orchestrated the marketing campaigns for Best Picture winners Forrest Gump and Braveheart. While at Paramount, she worked with an unusually large team of women there at that time, which included Dawn Steel, who was president of Production, as well as other women like Deborah Rosen, Lucie Salhany, Buffy Shutt, as well as Sherry Lansing. She was at Paramount for 13 years.

From 1997 to 1999, she was President of Theatrical Marketing for New Line Cinema, where she promoted Austin Powers: The Spy Who Shagged Me, The Wedding Singer and Boogie Nights. In this position, she was the first black woman to head a studio marketing department.

Boone Isaacs started her own company, called CBI Enterprises, Inc., where she worked on publicity for films that included Best Picture winners The King's Speech and The Artist.

=== Academy work ===
Boone Isaacs has been a member of the Academy of Motion Picture Arts and Sciences since 1987. All work for the Academy, even leadership roles, is on a volunteer basis.

As President of the AMPAS, Boone Isaacs was instrumental in removing the restriction of the number of members allowed into the Academy, what had been a long-time membership cap. She also initiated a drive to invite over 400 new members, many of whom were young and came from diverse backgrounds.

Boone Isaacs has been an active force in addressing the lack of diversity within the Academy of Motion Picture Arts and Sciences, and the predominance of white men among its membership. Her efforts also included strengthening AMPAS mentorship programs, improving the student version of the Academy Awards, and enhancing the organization's scientific and technical council.

Part of her duties as President included overseeing the Academy Awards. Boone Isaacs also oversaw the Governors Awards, where honorary lifetime achievement awards are given. Unlike the Oscars, the Governors Awards are not televised ceremonies. She has also spearheaded the development of an AMPAS museum developed in conjunction with Los Angeles Museum of Contemporary Art with a budget of $300 million, opening in 2017.

At the 2015 Governors Awards, Boone Isaacs launched A2020, an Academy initiative focused on increasing diversity in terms of age, gender, race, national origin, and perspective. The initiative included a five-year plan addressing industry practices and hiring. Honorary Oscar-winner Spike Lee praised Boone Isaacs for her efforts to promote diversity in Hollywood.

== Honors ==
- 2013: Black Entertainment Sports Lawyers Association (BESLA)
- 2013: Essence Magazine's Trailblazer Award
- 2014: African-American Film Critics Association (AAFCA) Horizon Award
- 2014: NAACP Image Awards Hall of Fame
- 2014: Chapman University Dodge College of Film and Media Arts O.L. Halsell Filmmaker-in-Residence

== Personal life ==
Boone Isaacs is married to film producer, director and writer Stanley Isaacs and lives in Los Angeles. They have a son, Cooper Boone Isaacs.

Non-profit organization positions
Preceded by Hawk Koch	President of the Academy of Motion Picture Arts and Sciences; 2013–2017	Succeeded by John Bailey
