= Jason Parham =

American writer and editor (born 1986)

- Born: 1986 (age 39–40); Los Angeles, California, United States
- Occupations: Writer and editor
- Known for: Founder of Spook magazine
- Website: jasonparham.com

Jason Parham (born 1986) is an American writer and editor. He is senior writer at Wired and the founder and editor-in-chief of the literary magazine Spook. He was previously an editor at Gawker and The Fader, and his work has also appeared in the Los Angeles Times, The New York Times Book Review, The Awl, The Atlantic, The Village Voice, and The New York Times Magazine.

== Early life ==
Parham is from Los Angeles, California, growing up in the Ladera Heights area.

== Career ==
Prior to joining Wired magazine, Parham was an editor at Gawker, The Fader, and Complex, drawing notice for commentary on a range of topics, including Ferguson, police brutality, and diversity in book publishing, journalism, and other media. Wired described Parham as "one of [Gawker]'s more visible advocates for inclusion." Other publications for which he has written include the Los Angeles Times, The New York Times Book Review, The Awl, The Atlantic, The Village Voice, and The New York Times Magazine.

Brooklyn Magazine named him to its 2016 list of "100 Most Influential People in Brooklyn Culture". Magic Johnson named Parham on a "32 Under 32" list of "individuals who exhibit the professionalism, hard work, values and talents to lead the reimagining of possibilities for tomorrow's business culture."

=== Spook ===
In June 2012, Parham founded the literary magazine Spook. Issues were published annually until 2018.

Naming Spook to its list of "30 Indie Magazines You Need to Know" in 2013, Complex wrote: "Only on its second issue, Spook is turning into a highly regarded news source with a global consciousness." Brooklyn Magazine called it a "gorgeous literary magazine" and Salon said Spook "is bringing a more nuanced, careful, thoughtful, complete vision of blackness into publishing [...] eclectic with beautiful prose, brilliantly cross-secting the diversity of American intellectual life."
