= Esler =

Esler may refer to:

Surname

- Ben Esler, Australian actor
- Erminda Rentoul Esler (1852–1924), Irish novelist
- Gavin Esler (born 1953), Scottish journalist, television presenter and author
- Lloyd Esler (born 1957), New Zealand natural history teacher and columnist
- Murray Esler, AM (born 1943), clinical cardiologist and medical scientist, Melbourne, Australia
- Philip Esler (born 1952), Portland Chair in New Testament Studies at the University of Gloucestershire
- Ty Esler, former Australian rules football player
- Frank Esler-Smith (born 1948), arranger and keyboard player for the soft rock band Air Supply

Given name

- Esler Dening GCMG OBE (1897–1977), British diplomat

Places

- Esler Airfield, military and public use airfield in Rapides Parish, Louisiana, United States
- Páirc Esler, a Gaelic Athletic Association stadium in Newry, County Down, Northern Ireland

== See also ==
- Eisler
- Elssler
- Esenler
- Besler (disambiguation)
- Fesler
- Hesler (disambiguation)
- Kesler
- Nesler
