= Eissler =

Eissler or Eißler is a surname. Notable people with the surname include:

- Chris Eißler (born 1993), German luge athlete
- Hermann Eissler (1860–1953), Austrian entrepreneur
- Kurt R. Eissler (1908–1999), Austrian psychoanalyst
- Rob Eissler, American politician
- Ruth Selke Eissler (1906–1989), American physician

== See also ==
- Esler
