= The Grandmother's Birthday =

Painting by Ferdinand Georg Waldmüller

- Artist: Ferdinand Georg Waldmüller
- Year: 1856
- Type: Oil on panel, genre painting
- Dimensions: 71.7 cm × 57.9 cm (28.2 in × 22.8 in)
- Location: Osborne House, East Cowes, Isle of Wight

The Grandmother's Birthday is 1856 oil painting by the Austrian artist Ferdinand Georg Waldmüller. A genre painting it depicts three generations of a family celebrating the grandmother's birthday.

Waldmüller was a leading figure in the Austrian art world. An exhibition staged in Vienna attracted the attention of the British Ambassador to Austria George Hamilton Seymour and arranged for him to travel to London to display his works. The picture t was given as a present by Prince Albert to Queen Victoria. It may have held particular appeal as in January 1859 she became a grandmother for the first time when Victoria, Princess Royal gave birth to the future Wilhelm II. It remains in the Royal Collection and now hangs at Osborne House on the Isle of Wight.

== Bibliography ==
- Herring, Sarah. Waldmüller Landscapes. Yale University Press, 2026.
- Marsden, Jonathan. Victoria & Albert: Art & Love. Royal Collection, 2010.
