= Nesler =

Nesler is a surname. Notable people with the surname include:

- Ellie Nesler (1952–2008), American criminal
- Fred Nesler (1944–2026), American politician
- Mark Nesler (born 1961), American country music artist

== See also ==
- Neller
- Nessler
