= Ellsler =

Ellsler is a surname. Notable people with the name include:

- Effie Ellsler (1855–1942), American actress, daughter of John
- John A. Ellsler (1821–1903), American actor, theatre manager, and acting instructor

== See also ==
- Elssler
