= Nessler =

Nessler or Neßler is a German surname. Notable people with the surname include:

- Brad Nessler (born 1956), American sportscaster
- Julius Neßler (1827–1905), German chemist
- Martha Nessler Hayden, (born 1936), American painter, maiden name Nessler.
- Karl Nessler (1872–1951), German-born American inventor
- Viktor Nessler (1841–1890), Alsatian composer

== See also ==
- Nessler ball, ammunition round made for the late smoothbore musket
- Nessler cylinder, laboratory tubes with a fixed volume
- Nesler
