= Felser =

Felser is a surname. Notable people with the surname include:

- Catharina Felser (born 1982), German racing driver
- Claudia Felser (born 1962), German professor of physics and chemistry, specialist in materials science
- Frida Felser (1872–1941), German opera singer and actress
- Larry Felser (1933–2013), American sportswriter
- Peter Felser (born 1969), German politician

== See also ==
- Fesler
