= Hermann Eissler =

Jewish art collector persecuted by Nazis (1860–1953)

- Born: 20 July 1860; Vienna, Austria-Hungary
- Died: 26 February 1953 (aged 92); Nice, France
- Other name: Dr. Hermann Eissler
- Occupation: art collector
- Known for: art collection

Hermann Jacob Eissler (20 July 1860 – 26 February 1953) was an Austrian entrepreneur and art collector persecuted and plundered by Nazis because of his Jewish origins.

== Early life ==
Eissler was born in Vienna in 1860. He was the son of the timber merchant, and stock broker, Jakob Eissler.

He studied at the Vienna Academic Gymnasium . He studied geology with Eduard Suess at the University of Vienna. He married Barbara Havliscek, (died before 1917). In 1929, he married Hortense, née Kopp (1895–1983).

He worked at "Josias Eissler & Söhne", which was located at Vienna I., Singerstraße 8; branch in Mistelbach, Lower Austria, Wienerstraße 15–17.

== Art collection ==
Eissler collected paintings, works on paper and sculptures, with his brother Gottfried (1861–1924). The Eisslers were among the best known and most important collectors in Vienna. Their art collections included Rodin, Goya, Galasso-Galassi and Italian, French and Spanish artists as well as 19th century Austrian artists such as Ferdinand Georg Waldmüller and Rudolf von Alt.

== Nazi persecution ==
When the Nazis integrated Austria into the Third Reich with the Anschluss in 1938, Eissler was persecuted because he was Jewish. In October 1938, the artworks in his collection were divided within the family between Eissler's wife, who was considered 'Aryan', and Eissler's daughter; nevertheless, the collection was seized shortly thereafter on the basis of the law prohibiting the export of monuments (see § 4a BGBl. Nr. 80/1923).

In the spring of 1939, he fled to Hungary. He then emigrated to France, via Switzerland and lived in Nice.

Some of his collection was appropriated by state museums, some works secreted to France, and some sold.

== Postwar attempts to reclaim artworks ==
After World War II, his widow and daughter tried to recover works of art from Austrian state ownership. Only some of the collection was restored to his heirs. Others are still being searched for. Works from his collection, are in the National Gallery of Art. Restitutions include:

- View of Lake Altaussee and the Dachstein by Ferdinand George Waldmüller (1834) on loan by the German government to the Staatliche Kunsthalle Karlsruhe, restituted to the heirs of Hermann Eissler in 2020.
- Wildbach Strubb [Der Wildbach Strubb bei Ischl] by Ferdinand George Waldmüller (1831) restituted to the heirs of Hermann Eissler in 2020
- Flora, Hygieia, Hippokrates, and Galen, (four paintings) by Ferdinand George Waldmüller, restituted in 2012.

== Gallery ==
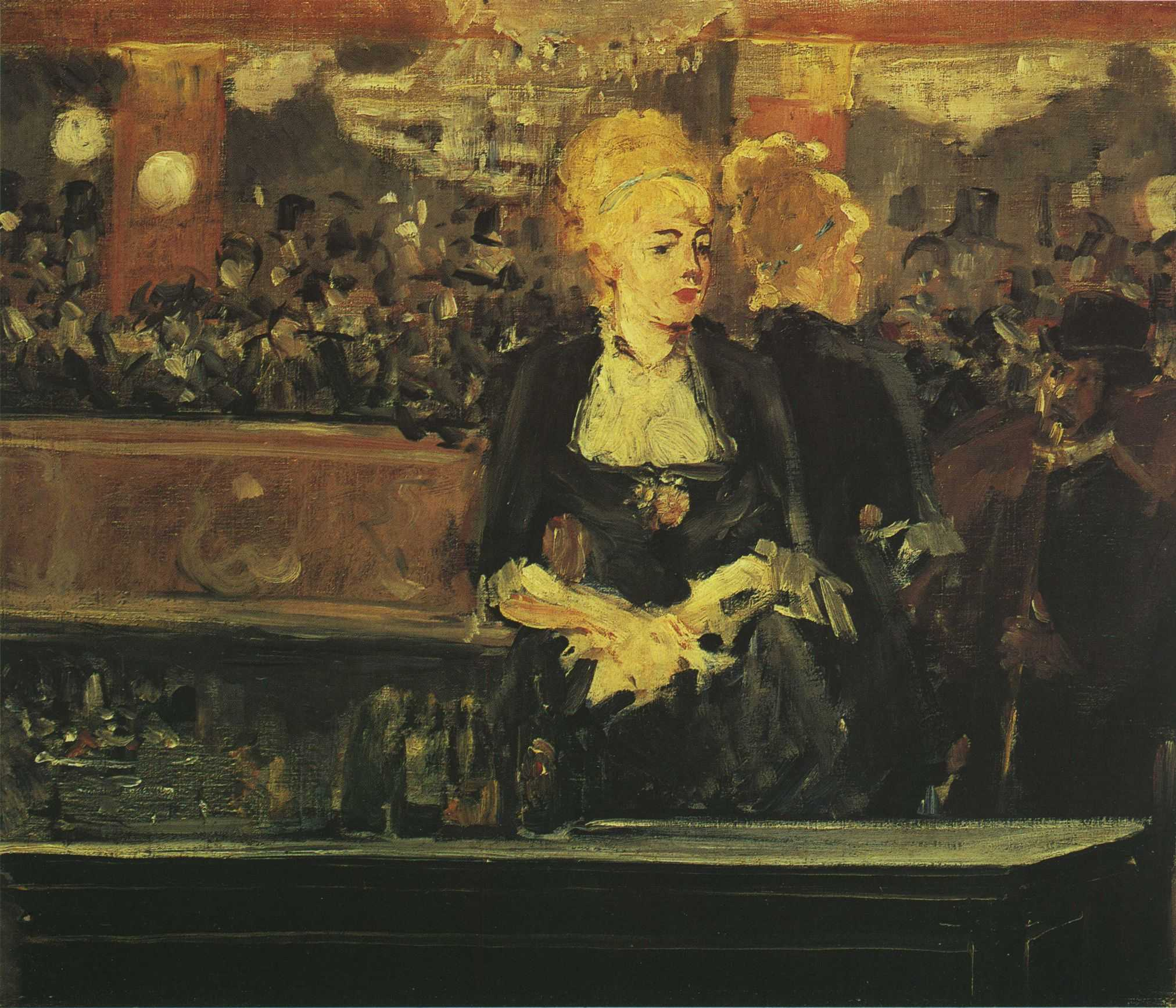
Le bar aux Folies-Bergère, Édouard Manet

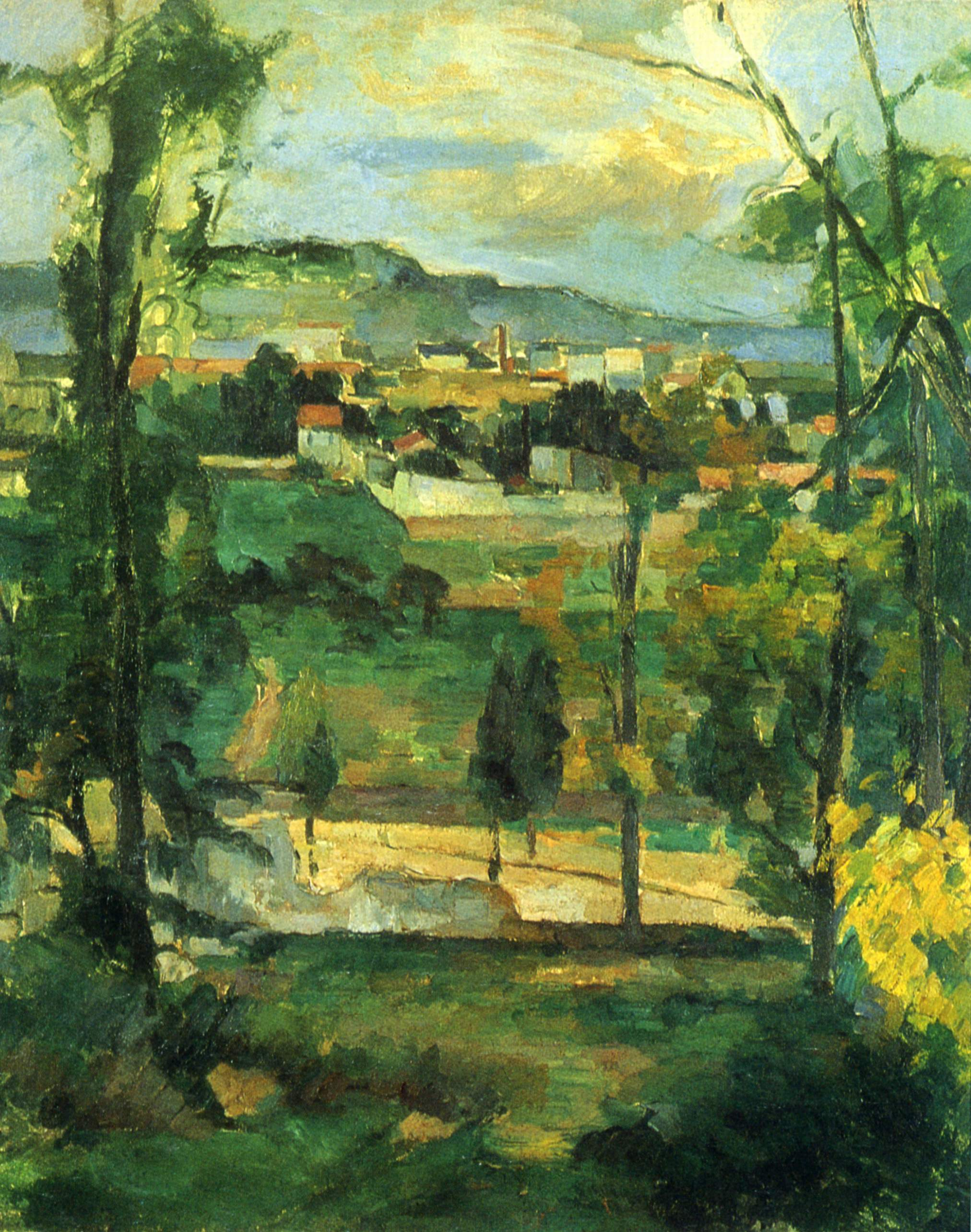
Village derrière des arbres, Île-de-France, Paul Cézanne

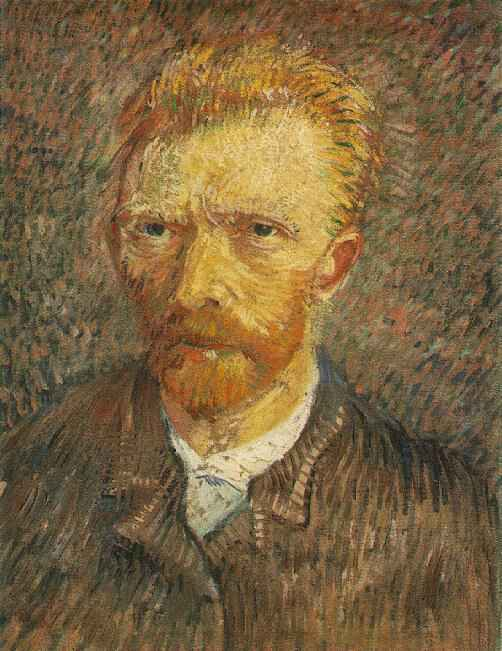
Self-Portrait, Vincent van Gogh

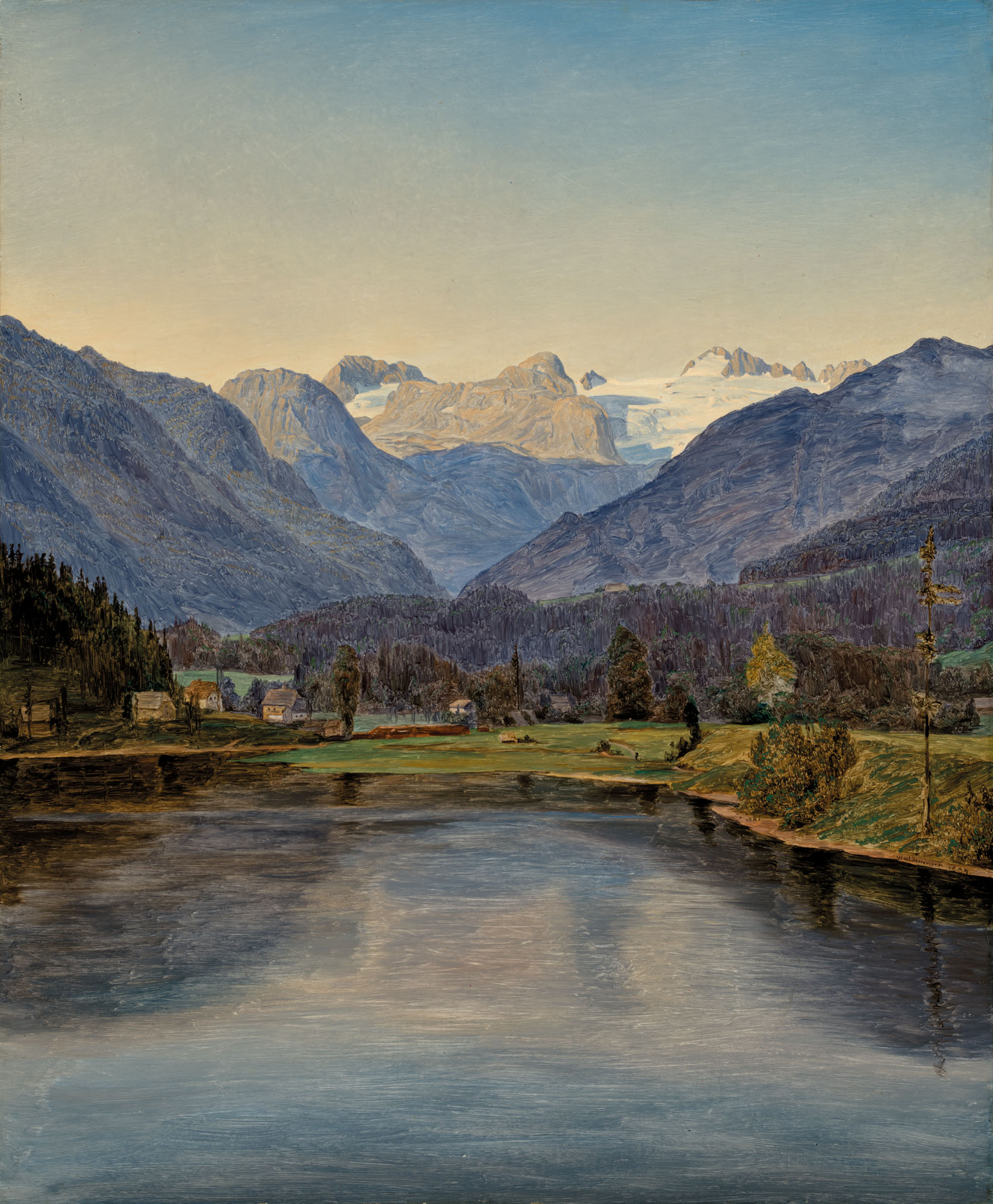
View of Lake Altaussee and the Dachstein, Ferdinand Georg Waldmüller
