= Neller =

Neller is a surname. Notable people with the surname include:

- Dane Neller (born 1956), American businessman and entrepreneur
- Keith Neller (born 1960), Australian rugby league footballer
- Robert Neller (born 1953), United States Marine Corps four-star general

== See also ==
- Nellore
