= Ferdinand Georg Waldmüller =

Austrian painter and writer (1793–1865)

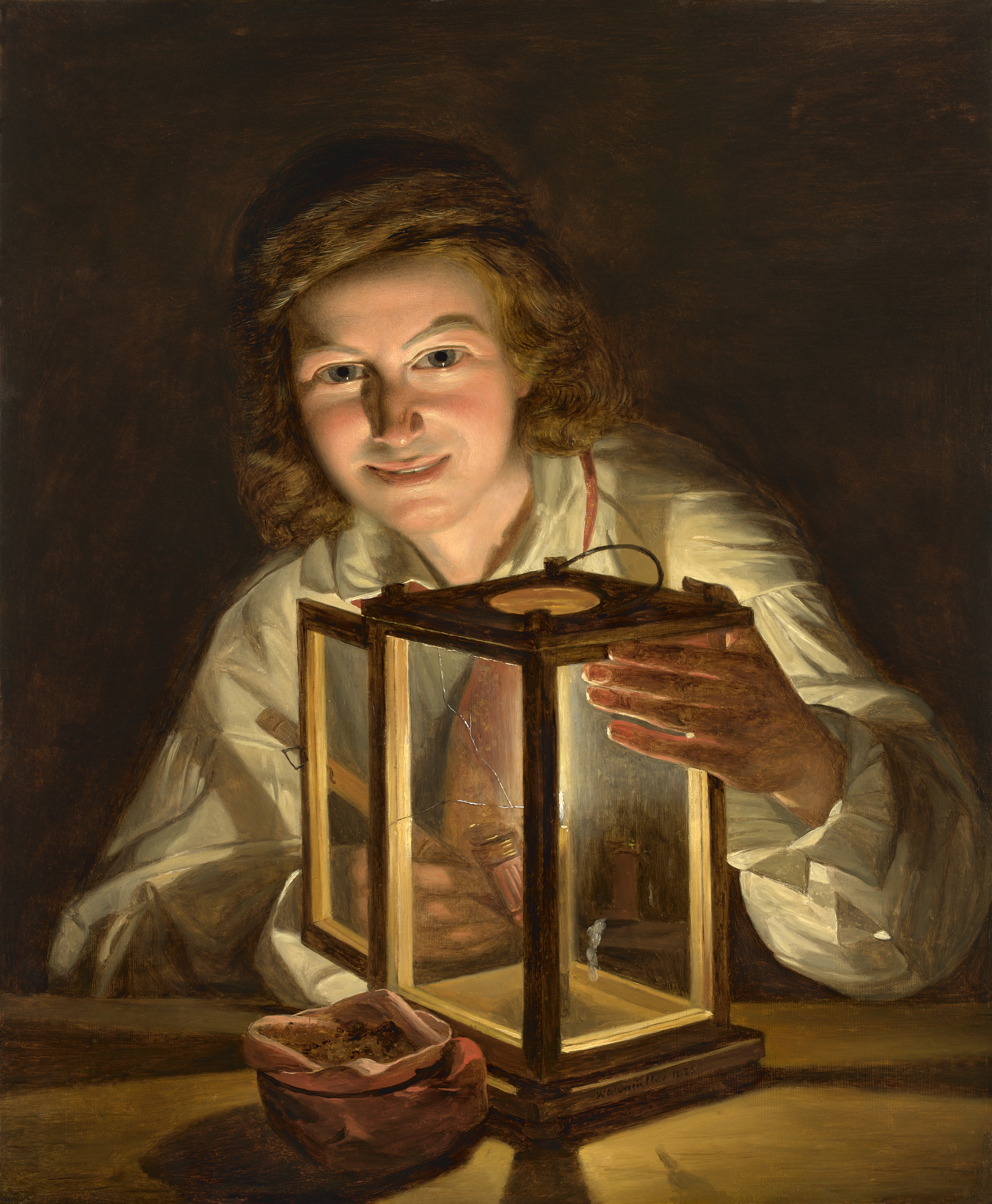
- Self-portrait with a Lantern (1825; age 32).
- Born: 15 January 1793; Vienna
- Died: 23 August 1865 (aged 72); Hinterbrühl
- Education: Academy of Fine Arts Vienna
- Known for: Painter, aquarellist
- Movement: Biedermeier Realism

Ferdinand Georg Waldmüller (Austrian German: [ˈfɛrdinand ˈɡeːɔrɡ ˈvaldmʏlɐ]; 15 January 1793 – 23 August 1865) was an Austrian painter. Waldmüller was one of the most important Austrian painters of the Biedermeier period.

== Career ==
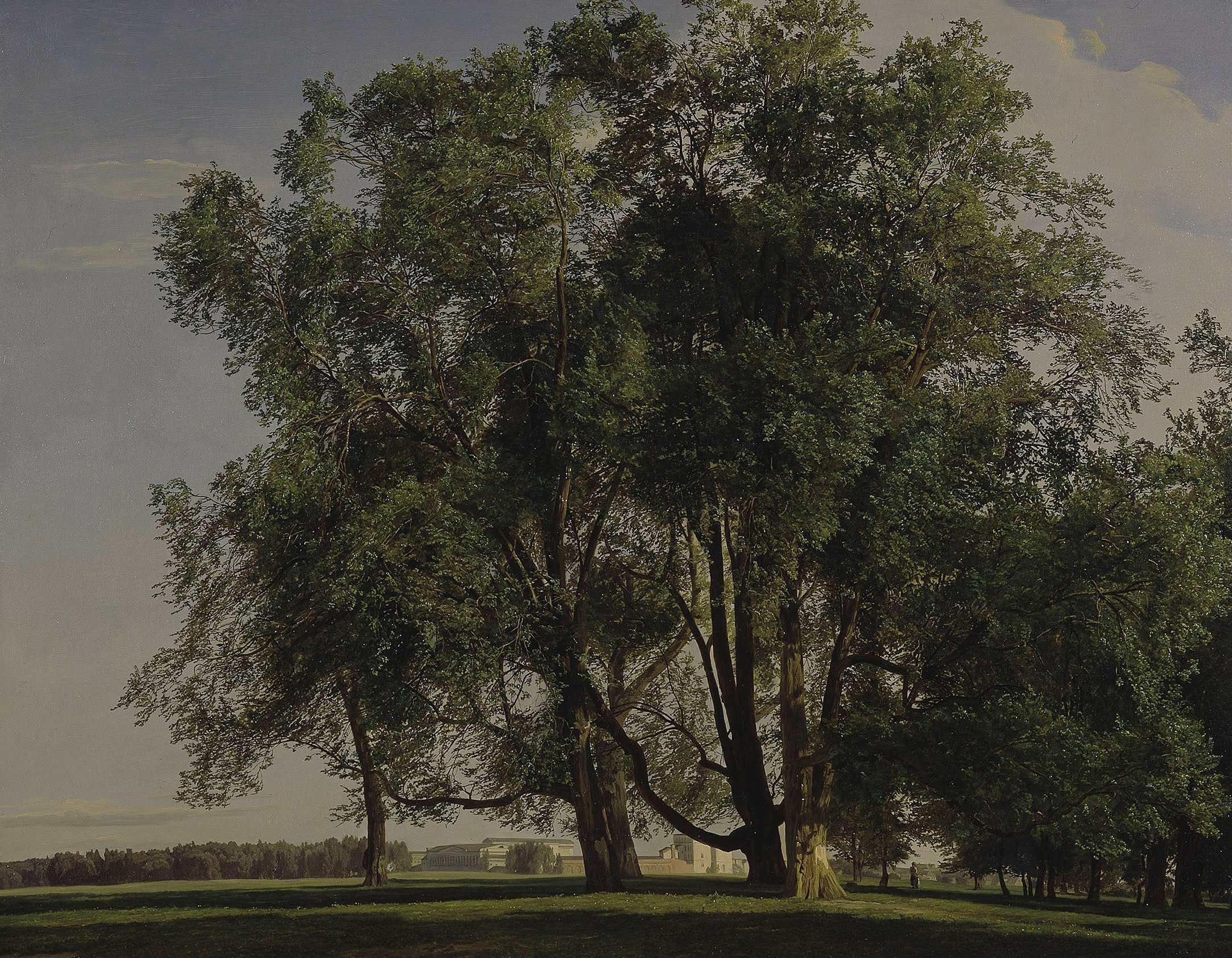
Prater Landscape (1830).

In 1807, Waldmüller attended the Academy of Fine Arts Vienna. He lived in Pressburg, Hungary and, in 1811, he worked as a teacher of arts for the children of Count Gyulay in Croatia. He returned to the Academy of Vienna and studied portrait painting. In 1814 he married the singer Katharina Weidner, and subsequently went on tour with her, working as a set designer.

In 1817, Waldmüller returned to Vienna and spent much time copying the works of old masters and painting portraits, genre subjects, and still-life. In 1823 he made a portrait of Ludwig van Beethoven, now part of the musical collection of the Kunsthistorisches Museum (KHM) in Vienna. Waldmüller later became interested in nature and started painting landscapes, which in their loving attention to detail illustrate Waldmuller's belief that the close study of nature should be the basis of painting. These are his most notable works, in which his sense of colour and knowledge of nature helped him to achieve masterly skill.

In 1819, Waldmüller became professor in the Academy of Fine Arts Vienna, but had disputes with the Viennese establishment, most notably for his views on the system of the academy, where he wanted to establish a focus of the study on nature. His views were in opposition to the official doctrines of ideal art promulgated by the Vienna Academy, and after he had published his works on art education, he was forced to retire in 1857. By 1863 he had been accepted back into the art circles of Vienna, and was knighted in 1865.

Ferdinand Georg Waldmüller was one of the most important Austrian painters of the Biedermeier period. Whether it was the conquest of the landscape and thus the convincing rendering of closeness or distance, the accurate characterisation of the human face, the detailed and refined description of textures, or the depiction of rural everyday life: his works – brilliant, explanatory, moralising, and socially critical – influenced a whole generation of artists. Being an advocate of natural observation and plein air painting, as well as a critic of academic painting, Waldmüller was far ahead of his time.

Waldmuller died on 23 August 1865 in Hinterbrühl, Austria.

== Nazi-looted art ==
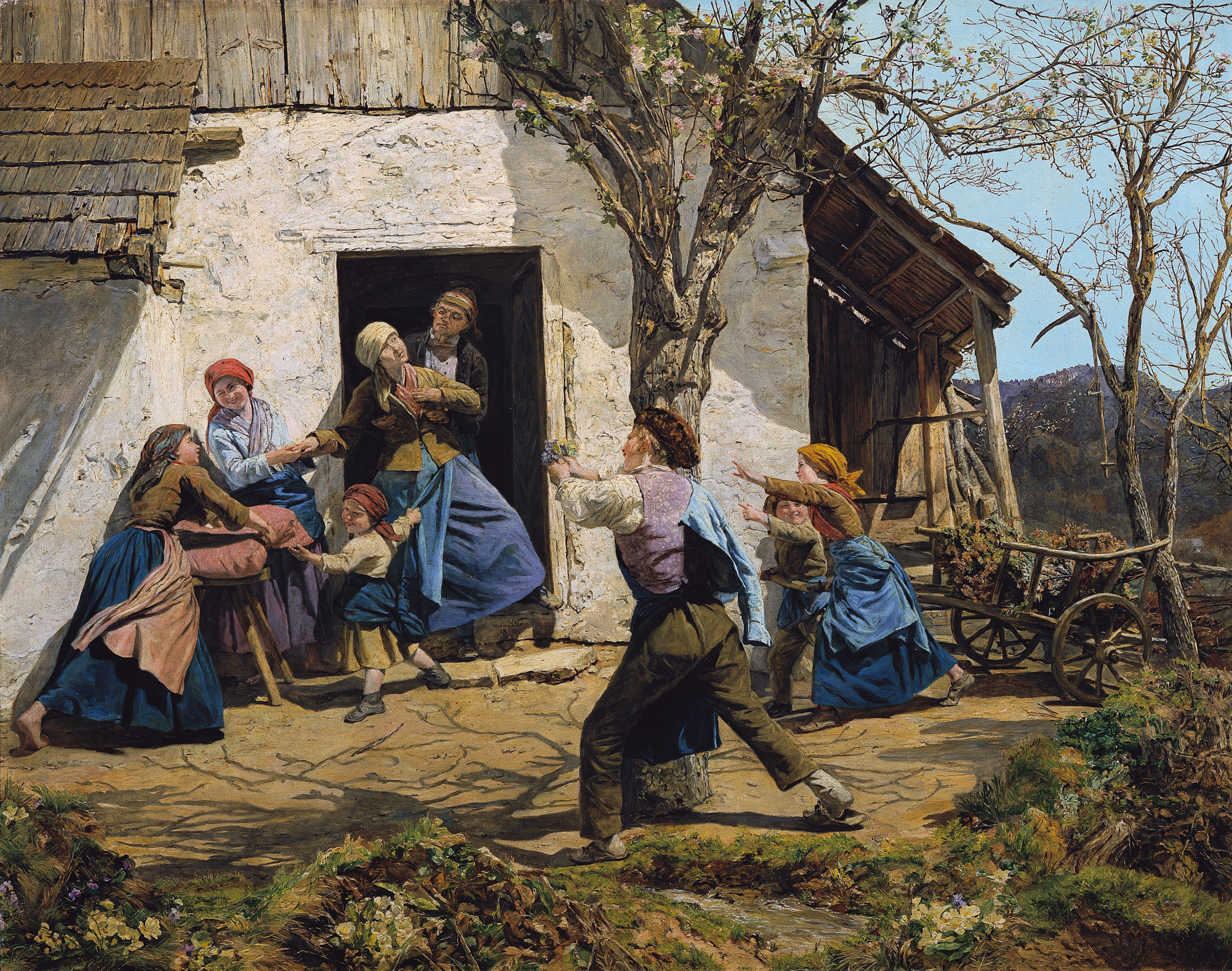
Wiedergenesene

Waldmüller was one of Adolf Hitler's favorite artists. Under the Nazis, 1933–1945, many artworks by Waldmüller were seized from Jewish collectors and several were channeled to Hitler's planned Führermuseum in Linz.

Claims for restitution of looted Wadlmüller artworks include(d):

- Children on Their Way Home from School was stolen from Amalie Redlich in Nazi Austria.
- Little Count Esterhazy was looted from the Bloch-Bauer collection.
- Bildnis der Familie Gierster was stolen from Franz and Melania Popper.
- Wiedergenesene was taken from Hermann Eissler.
- Irma and Oscar Lowenstein for three Walmüllers seized under the anti-Jewish Nuremberg Laws for Hitler's planned Linz museum: The Good-Natured Child; Preparing the Celebration of the Wine Harvest, and The Grandparents’ Visit.

== Gallery ==
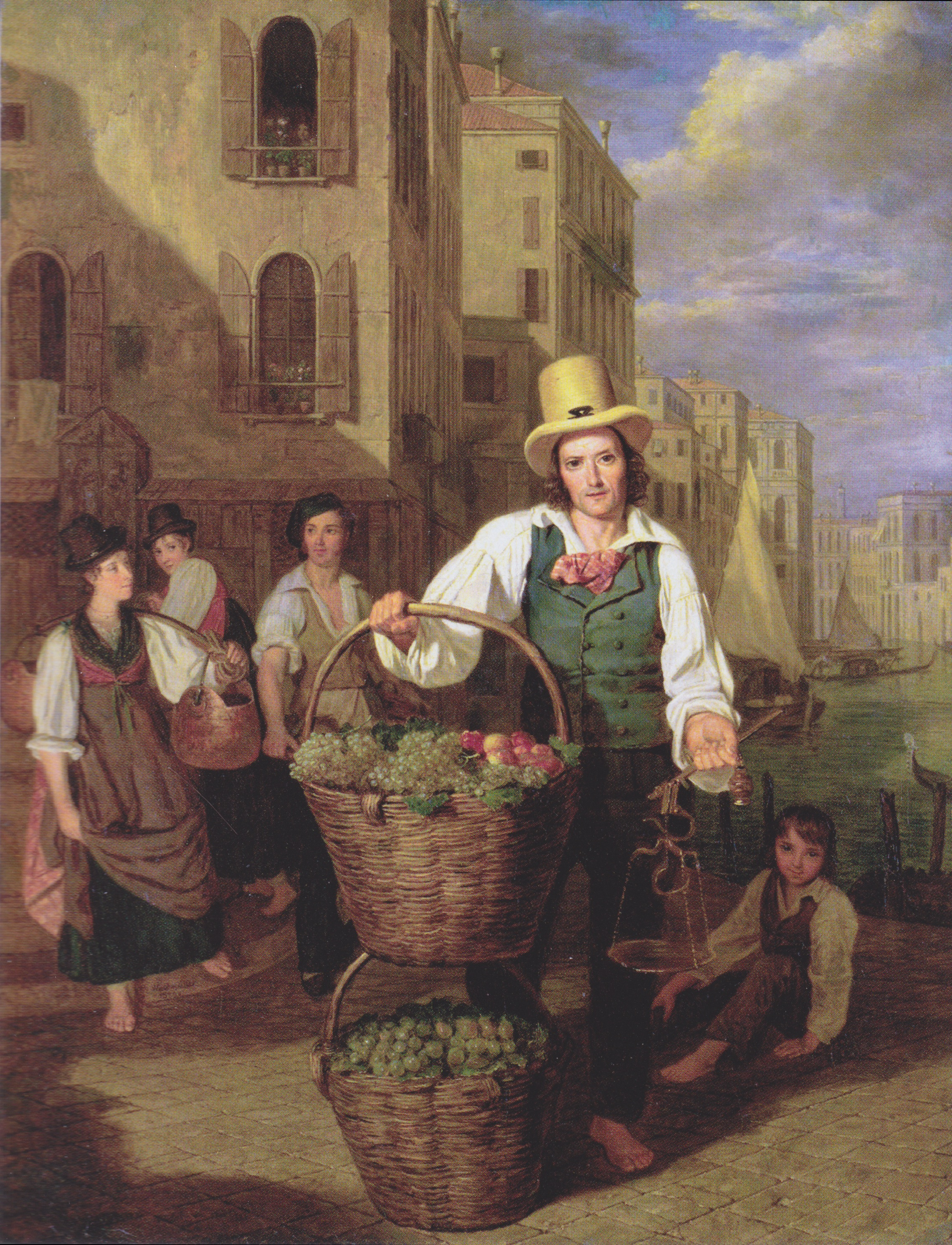
Venetian fruit seller (1826)

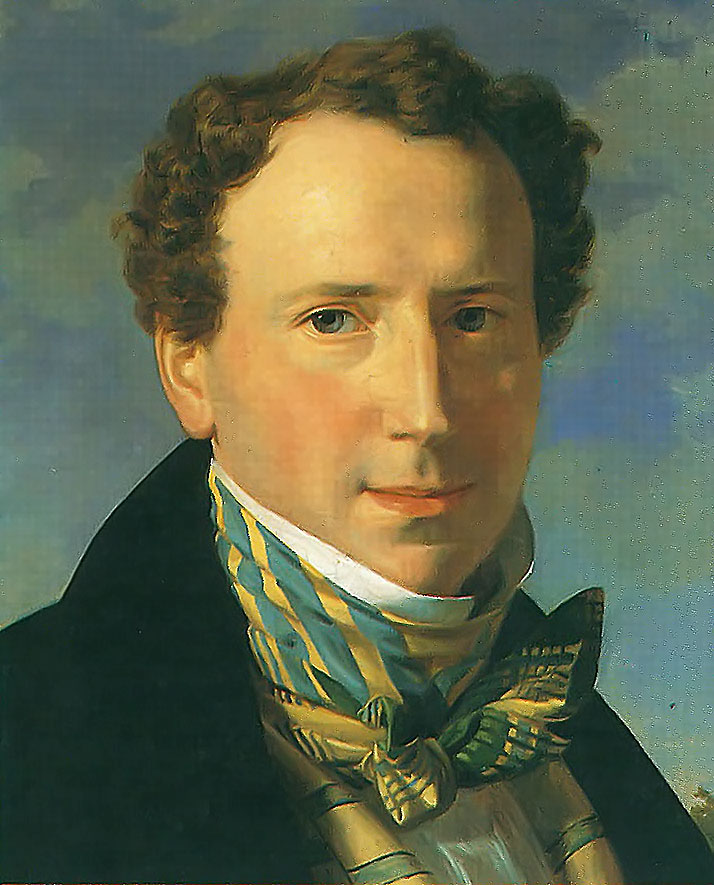
Ferdinand Georg Waldmüller—self-portrait, detail (1828; age 35)

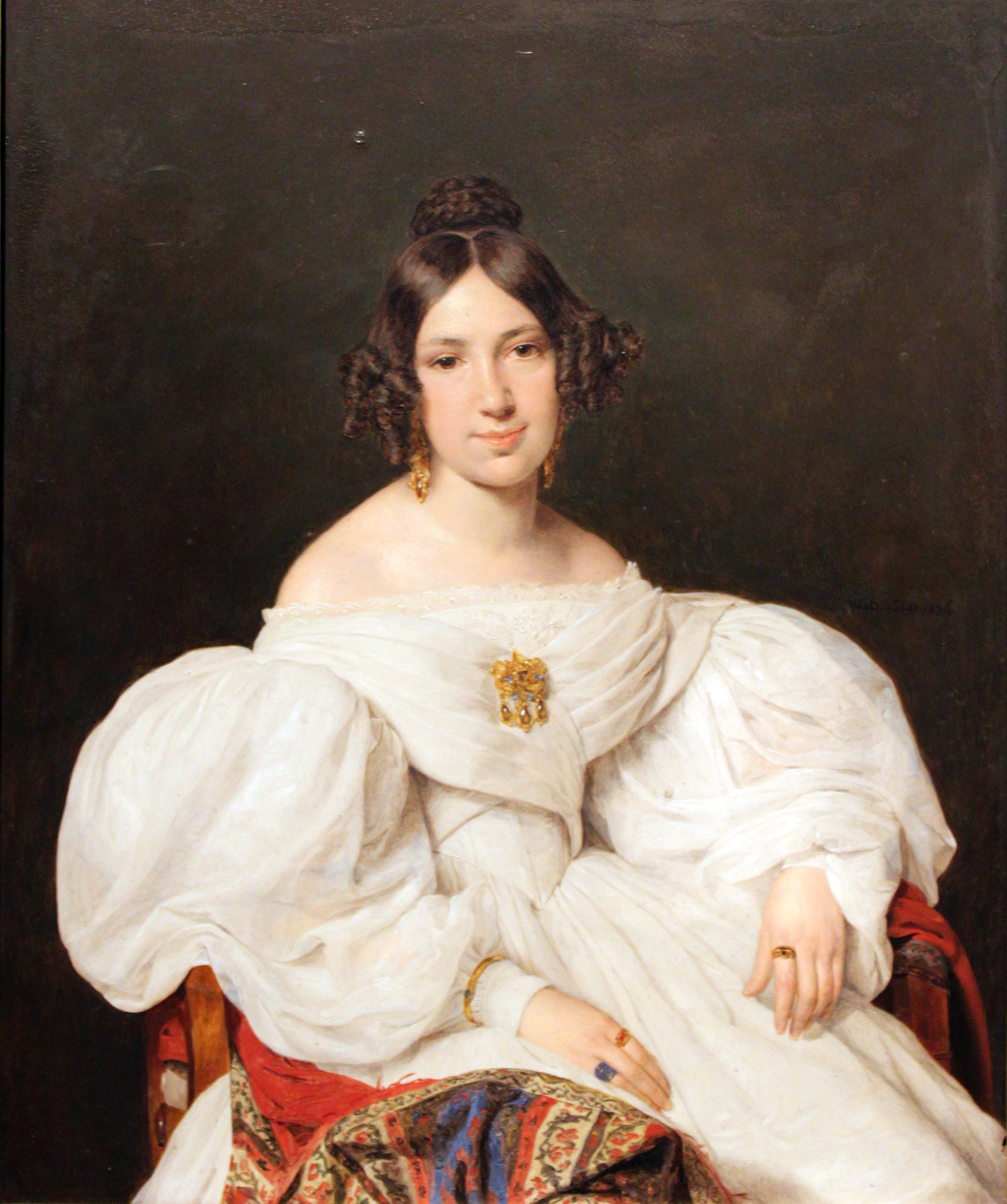
Louise Mayer (1836)

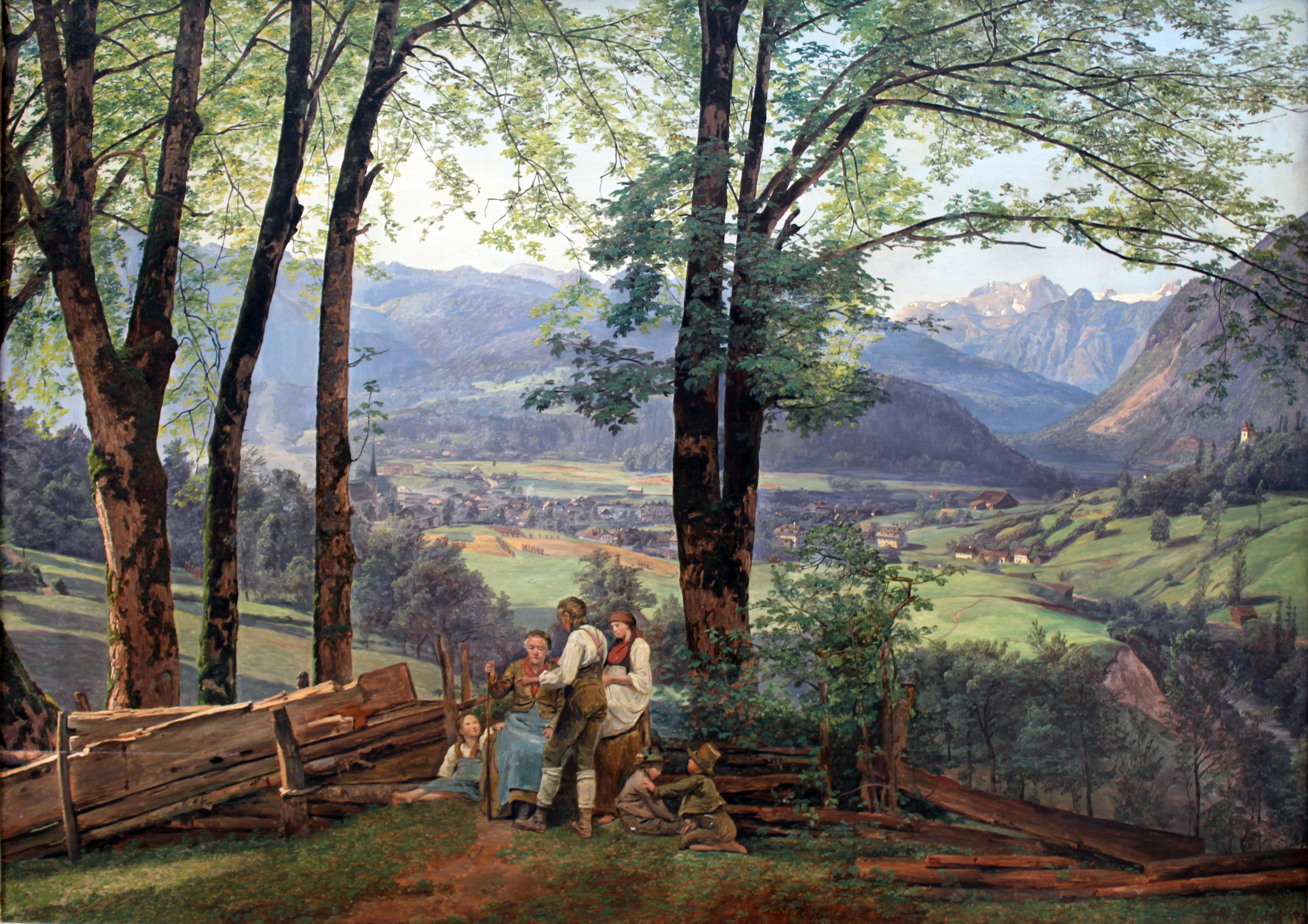
View of Ischl (1838)

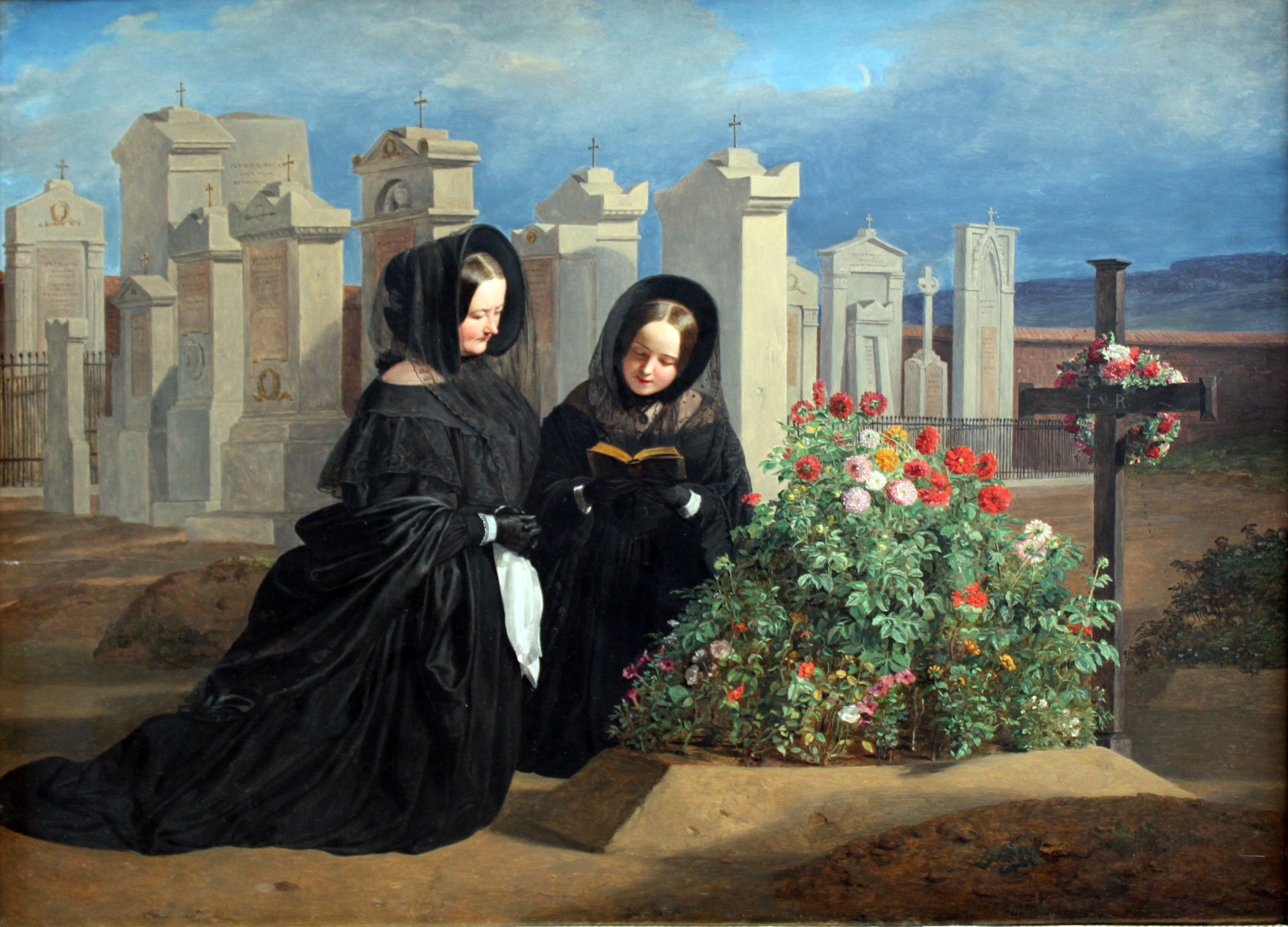
On All Souls' Day (1839)

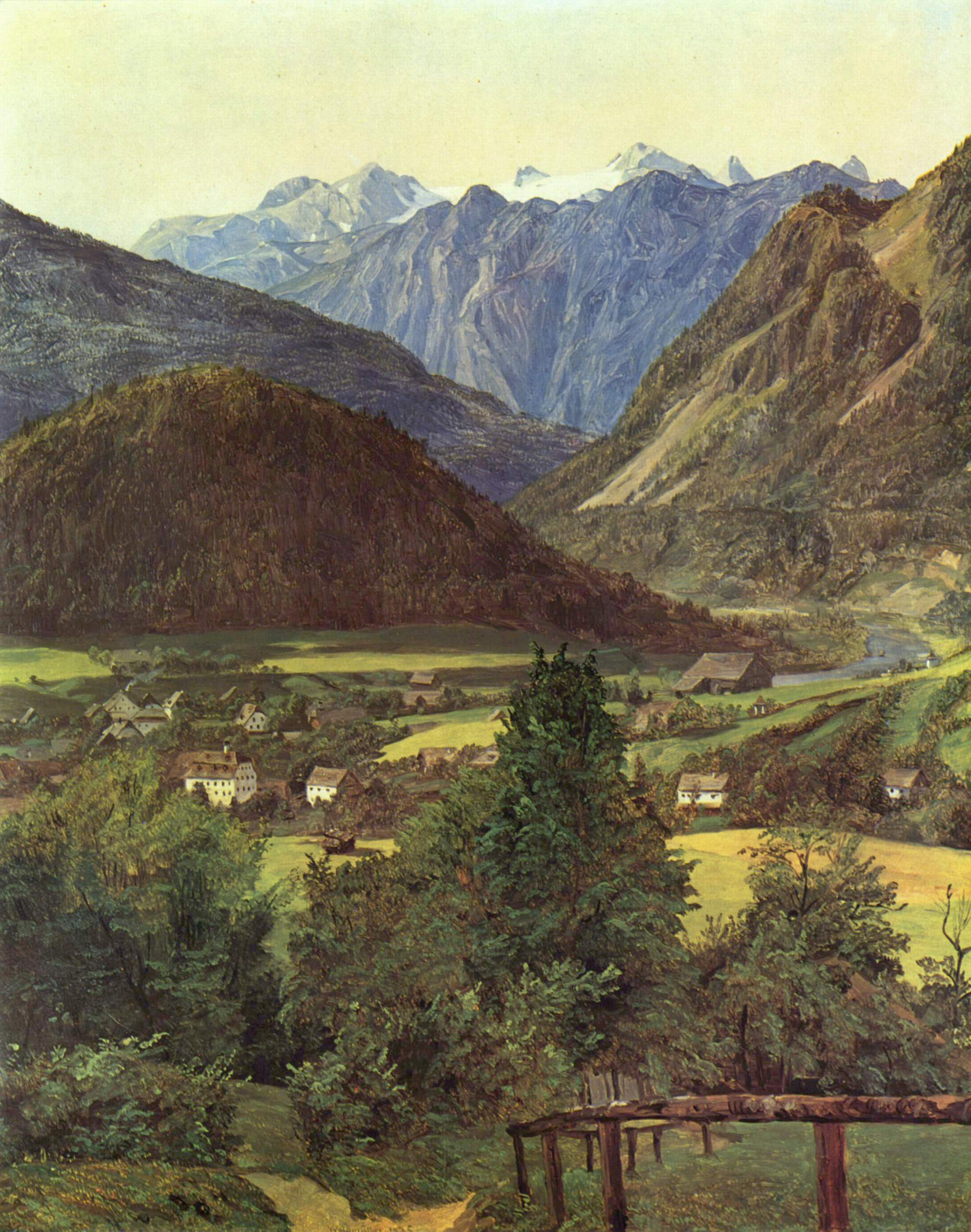
Dachstein (1839)

Reception of Grand Duke Alexander Nikolayevich by Prince Metternich (1839)

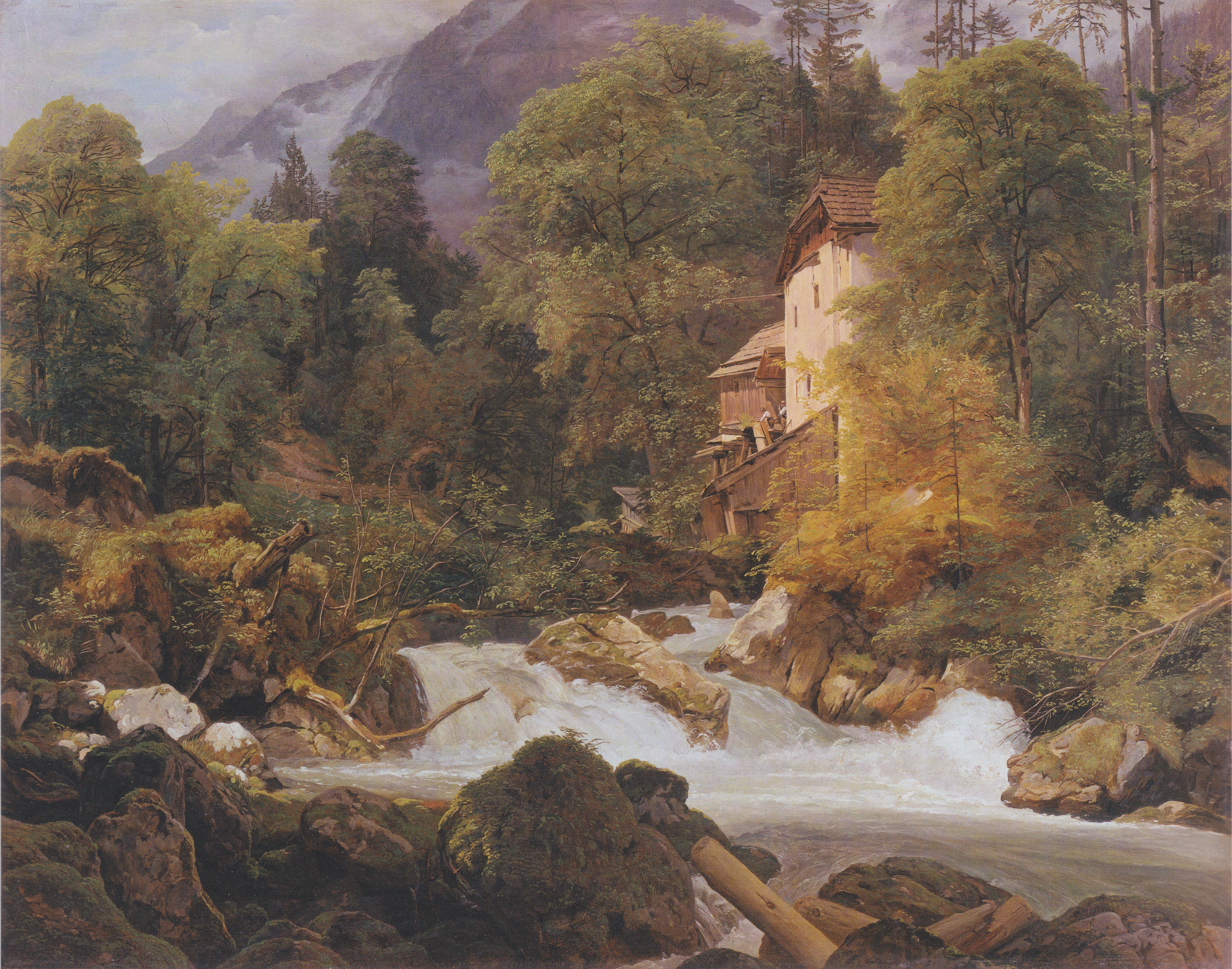
Waterfall (1840)

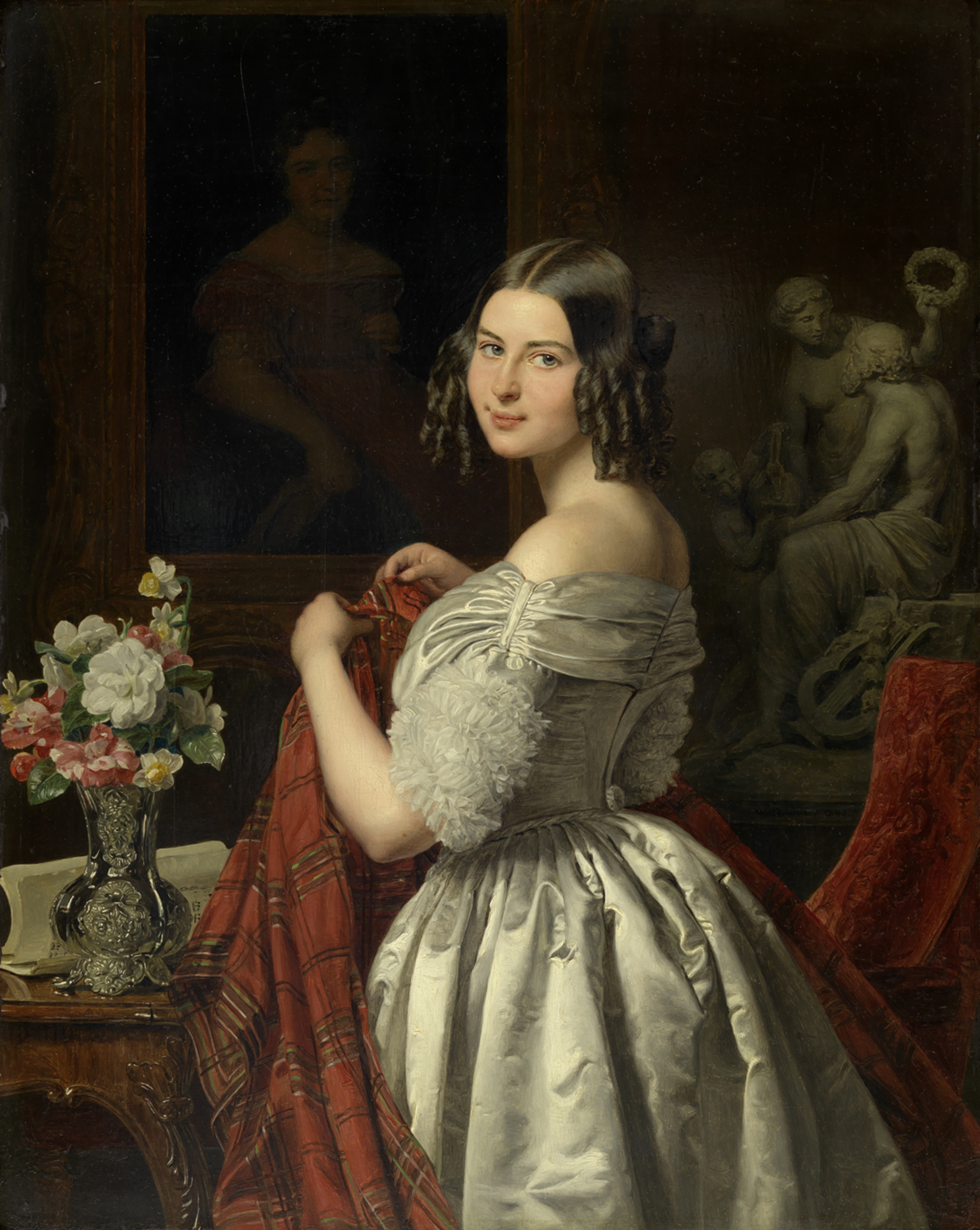
Young Lady (1840)

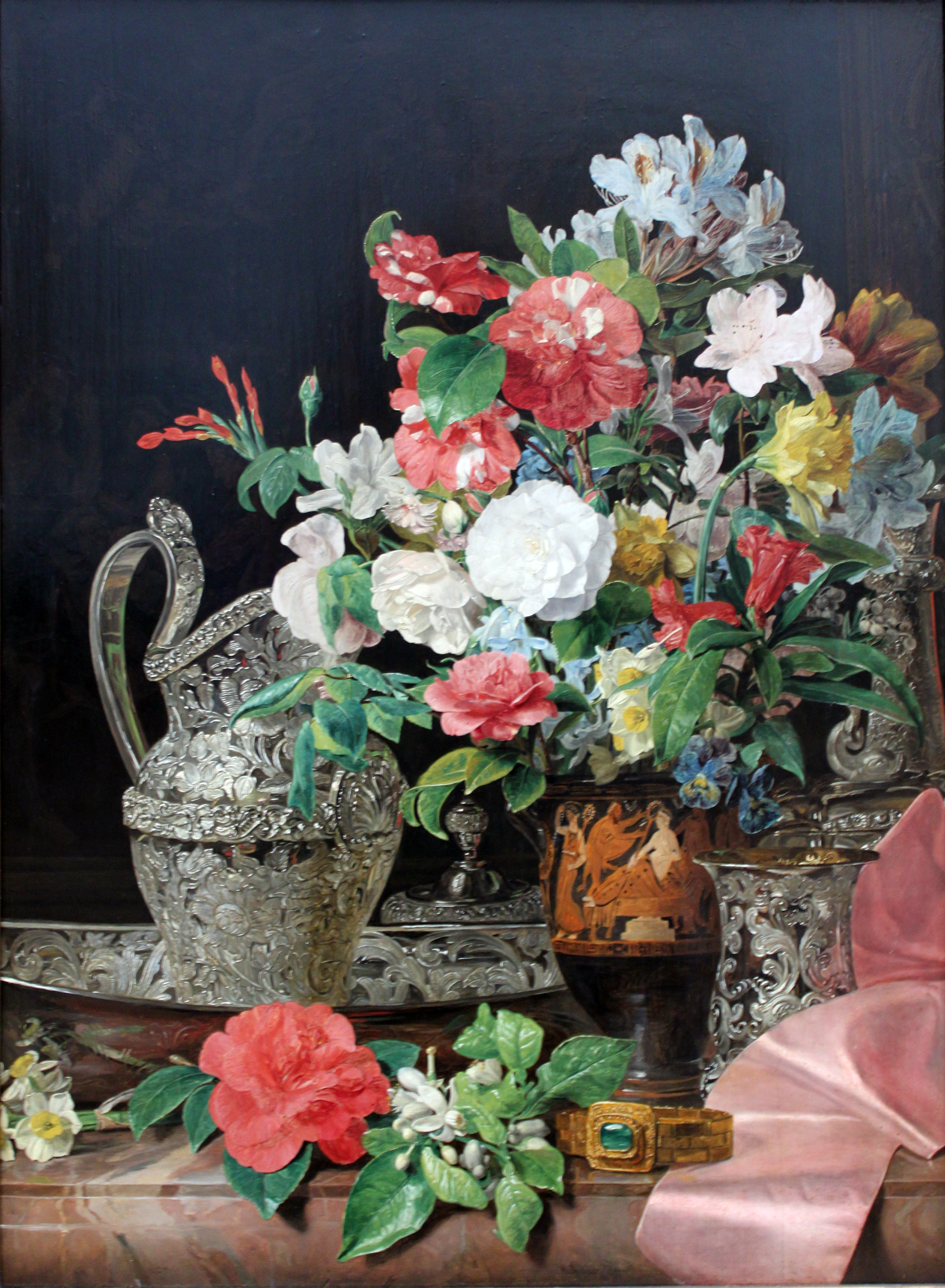
Still life with bouquet, silver vessels and antique vase (1840)

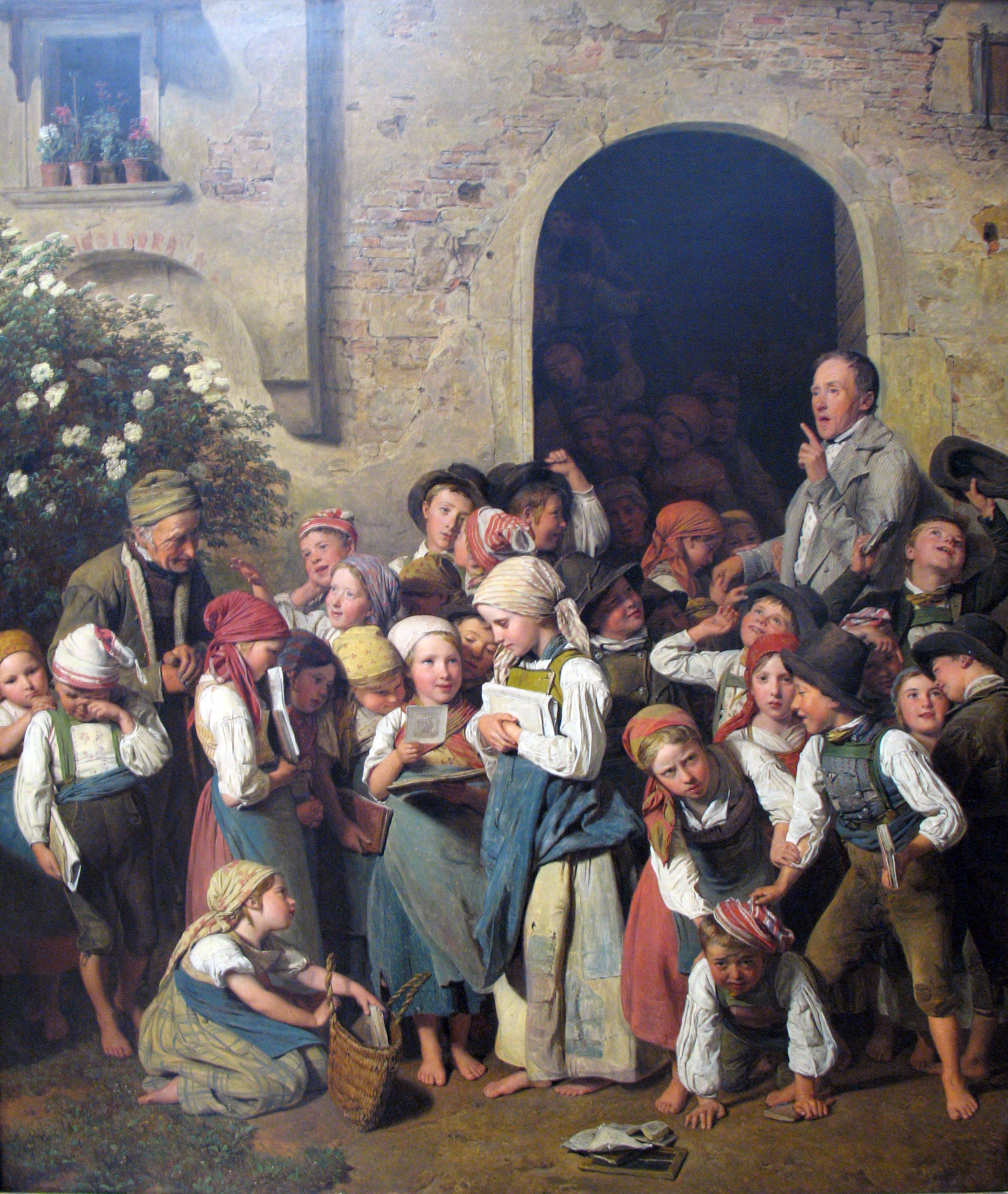
After school (1841)

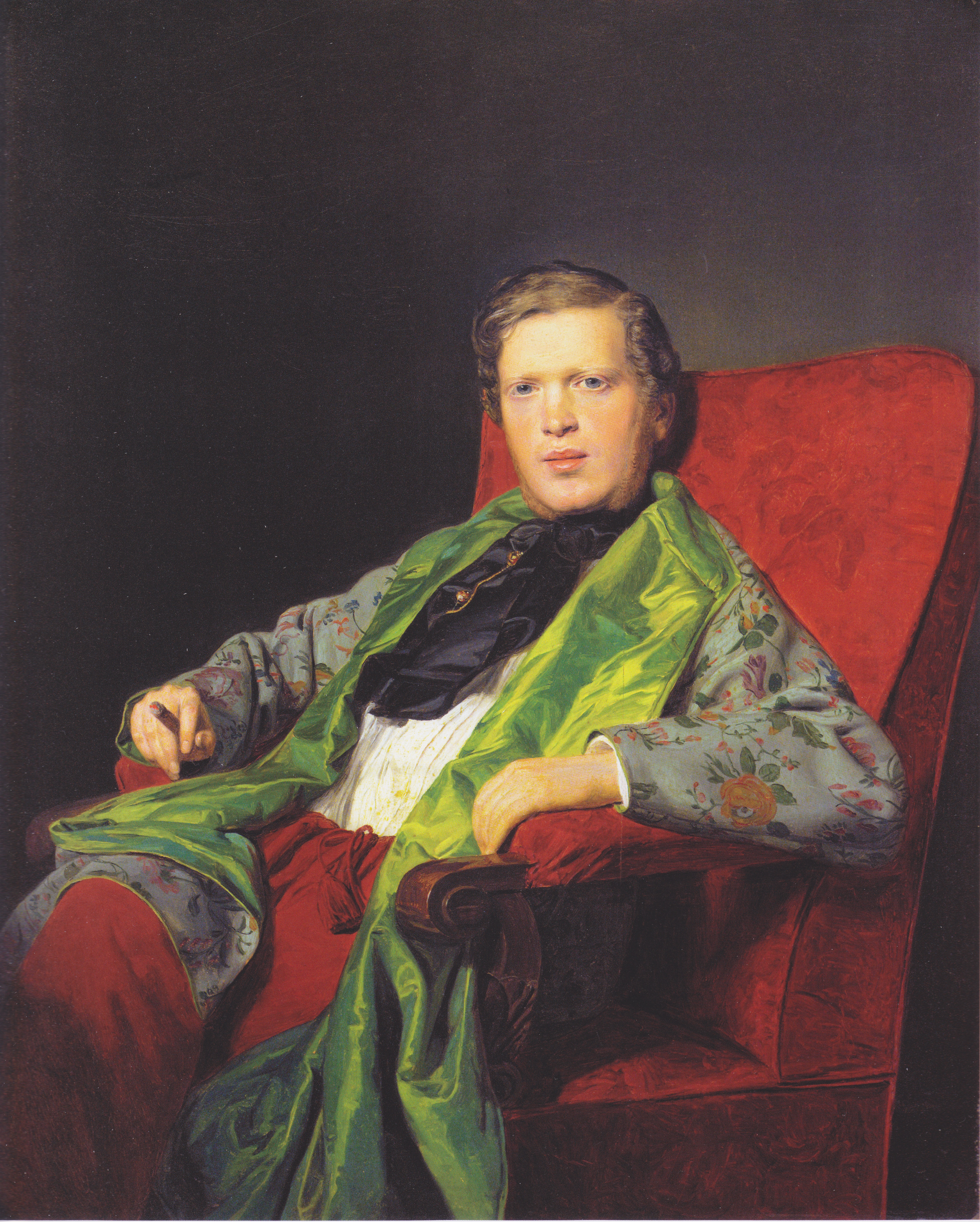
Emanuel Ritter von Neuwall (1841)

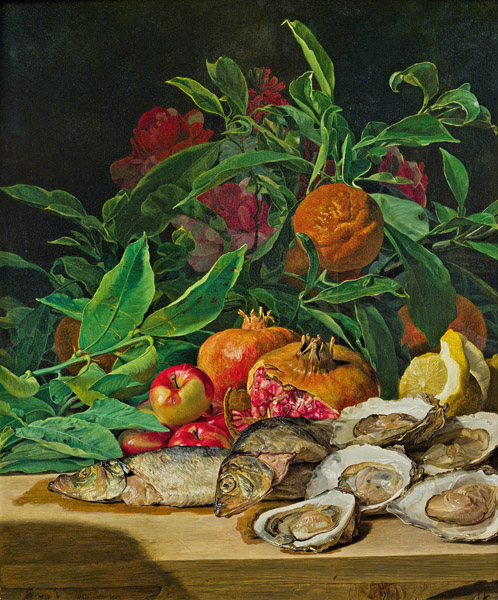
Still life with oysters, fish and exotic fruit (1842)

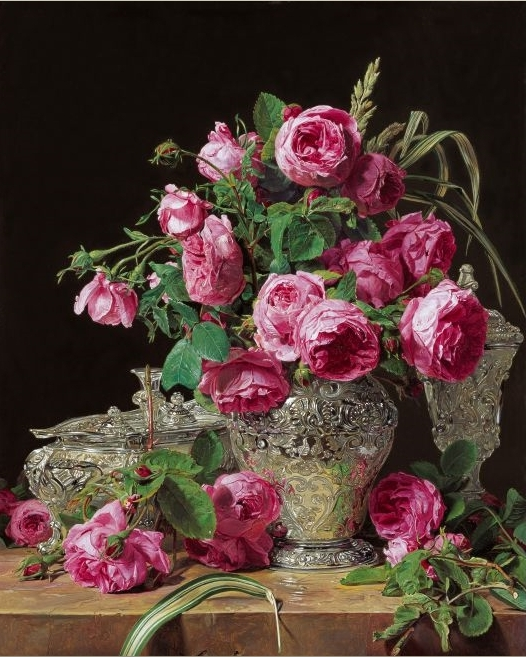
Roses (1843)

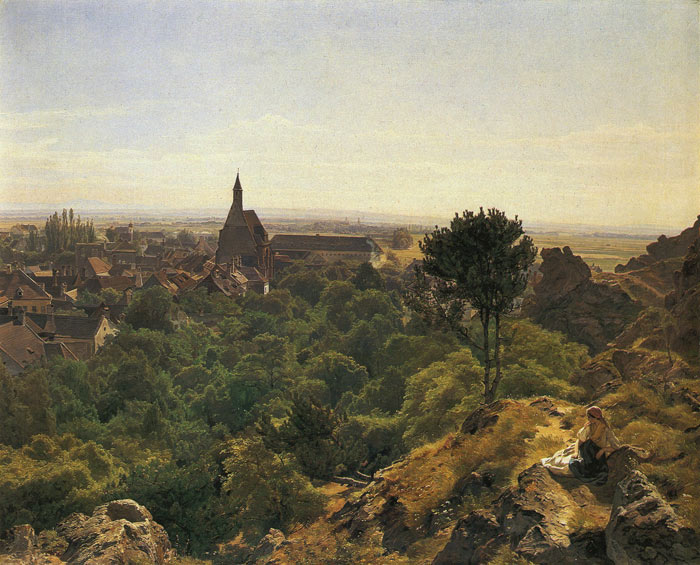
Sunny Day (1848)

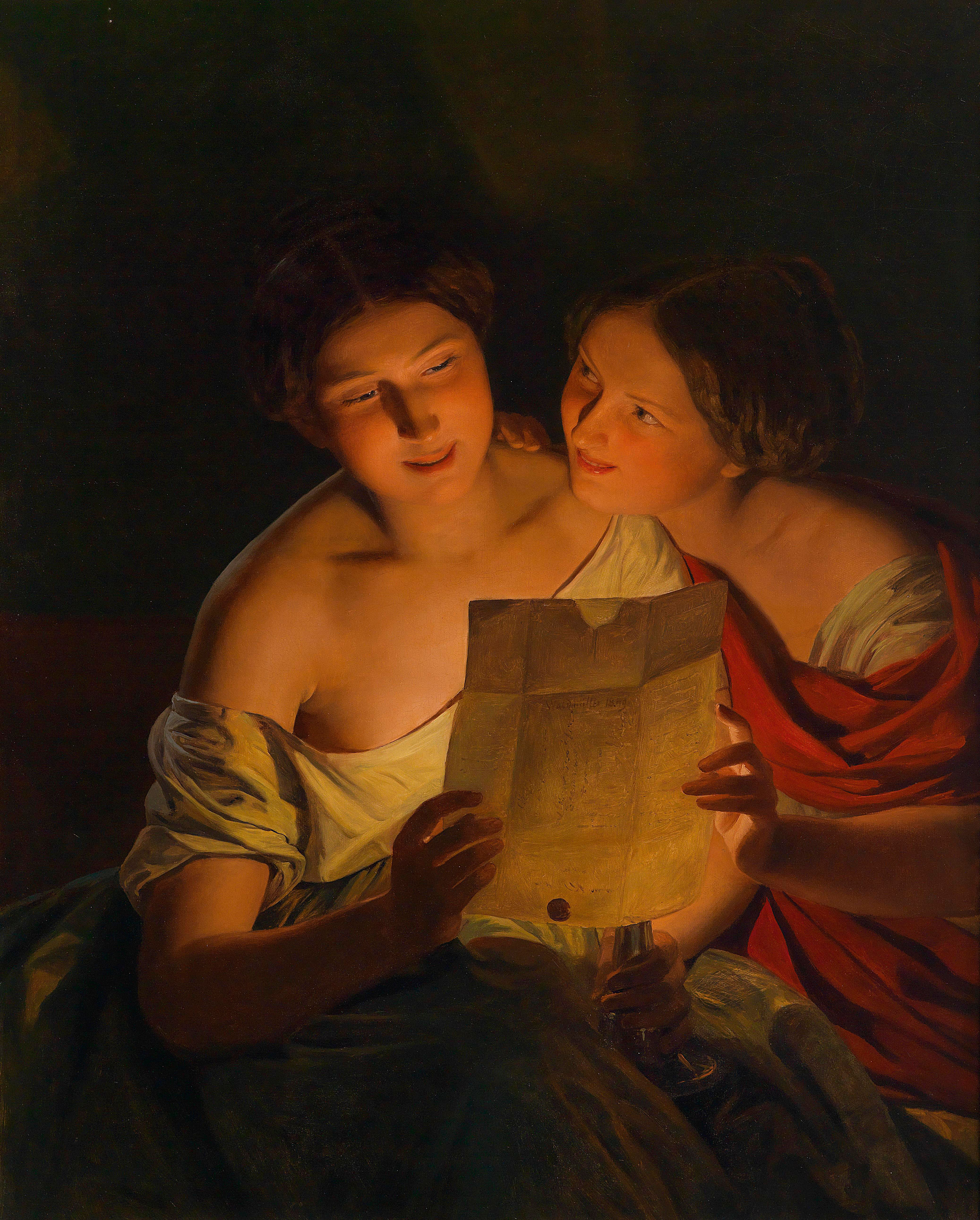
The love letter (1849)

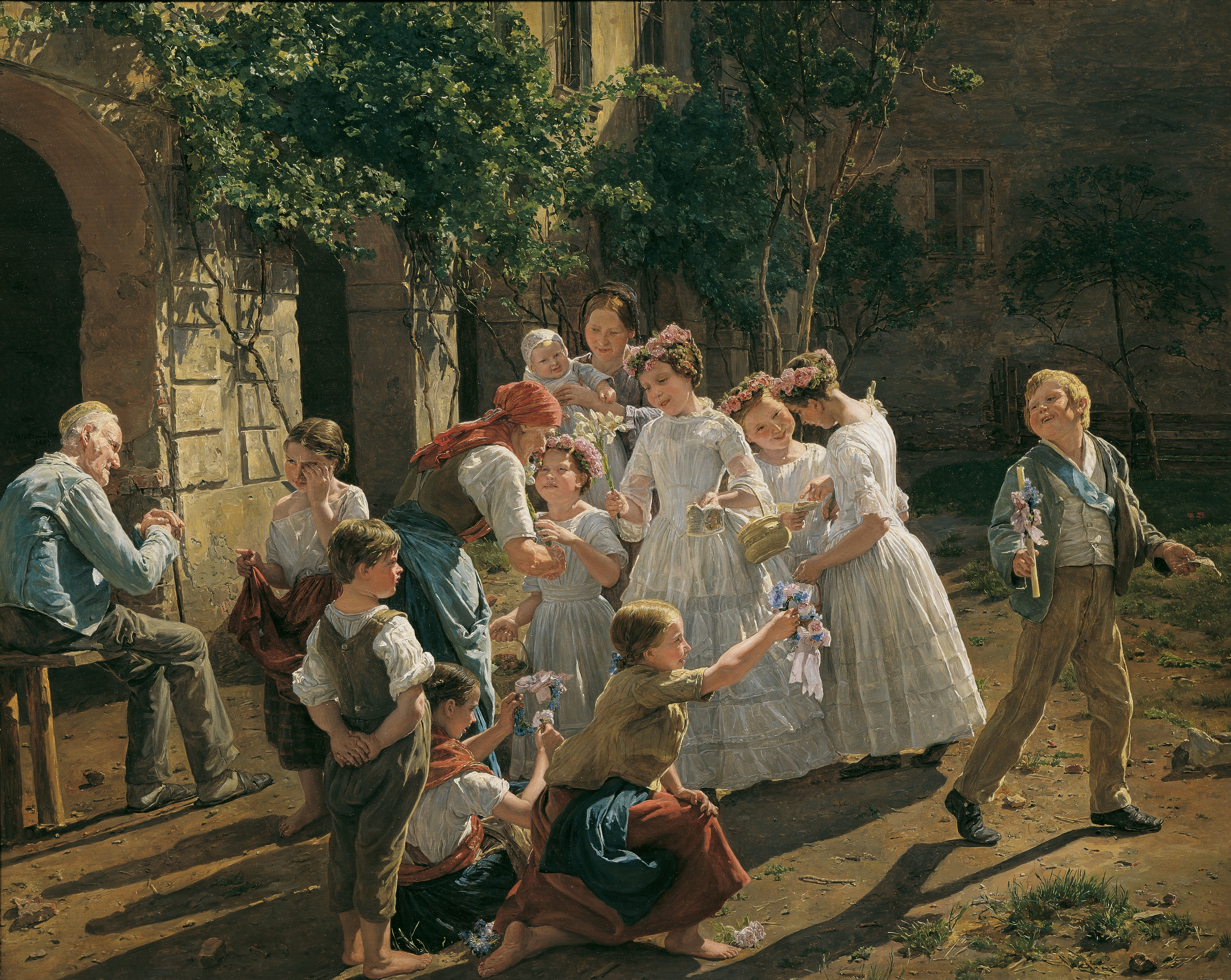
Am Fronleichnamsmorgen (1857)

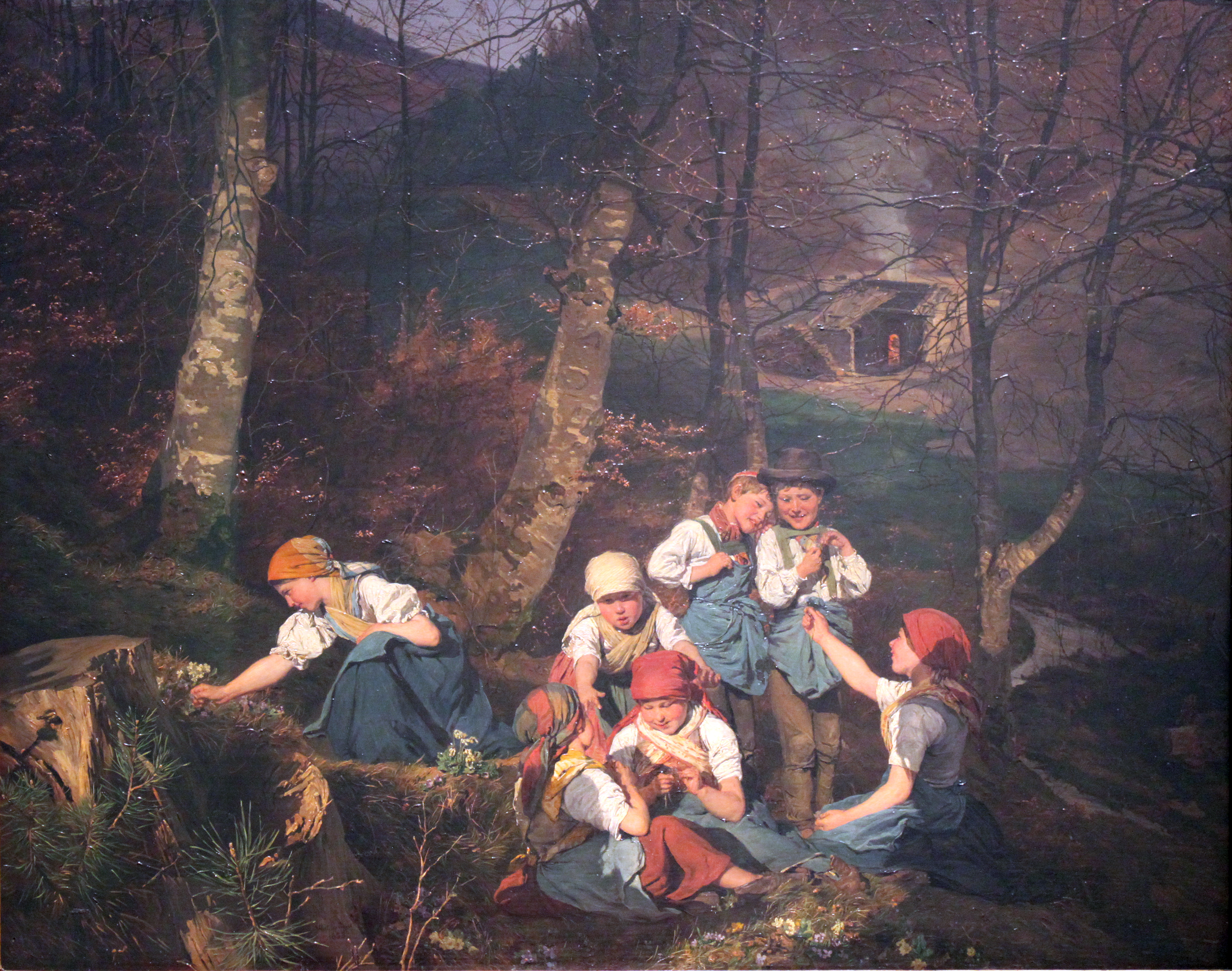
Children in a forest (1858)

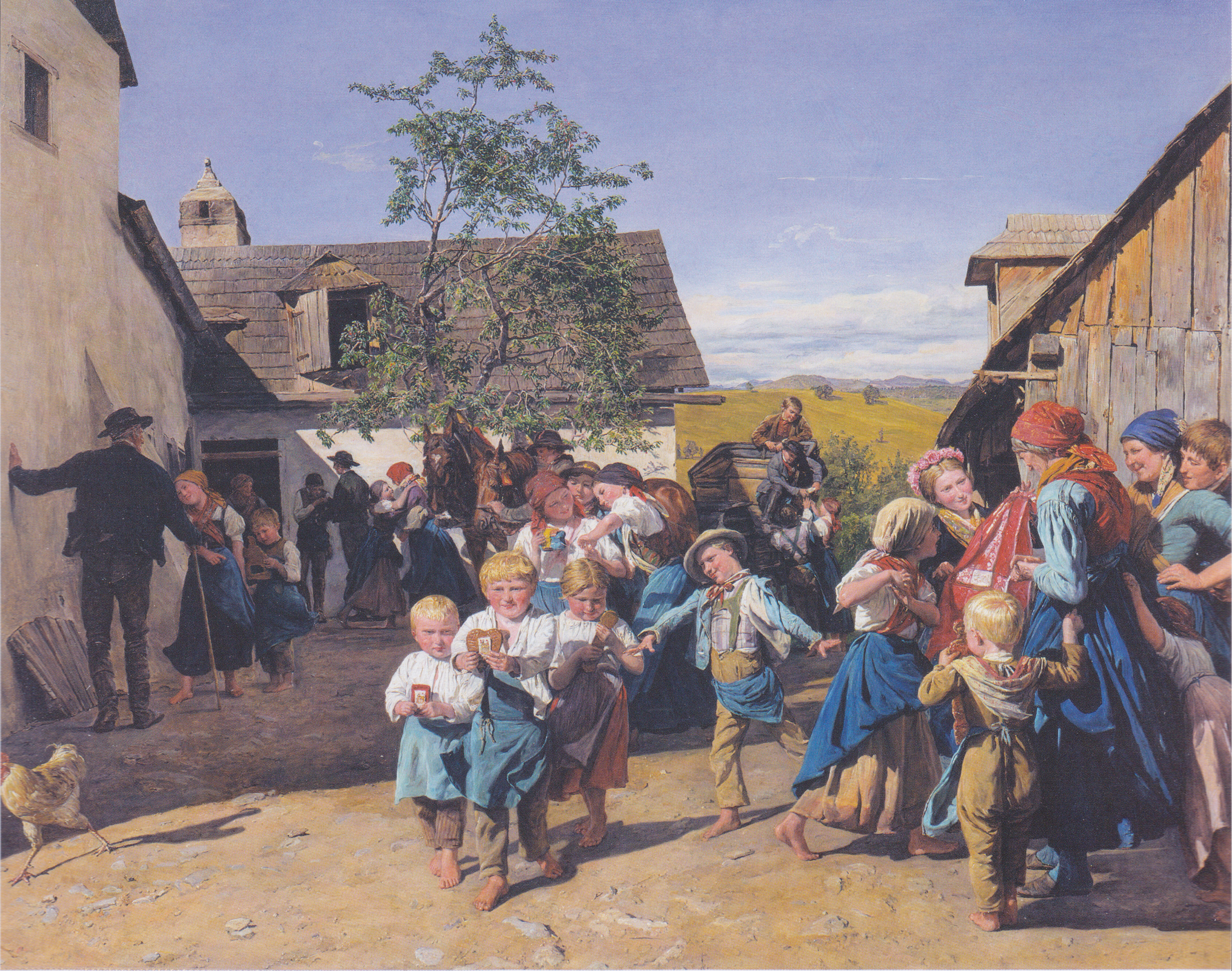
Return from the Church Fair (1859)

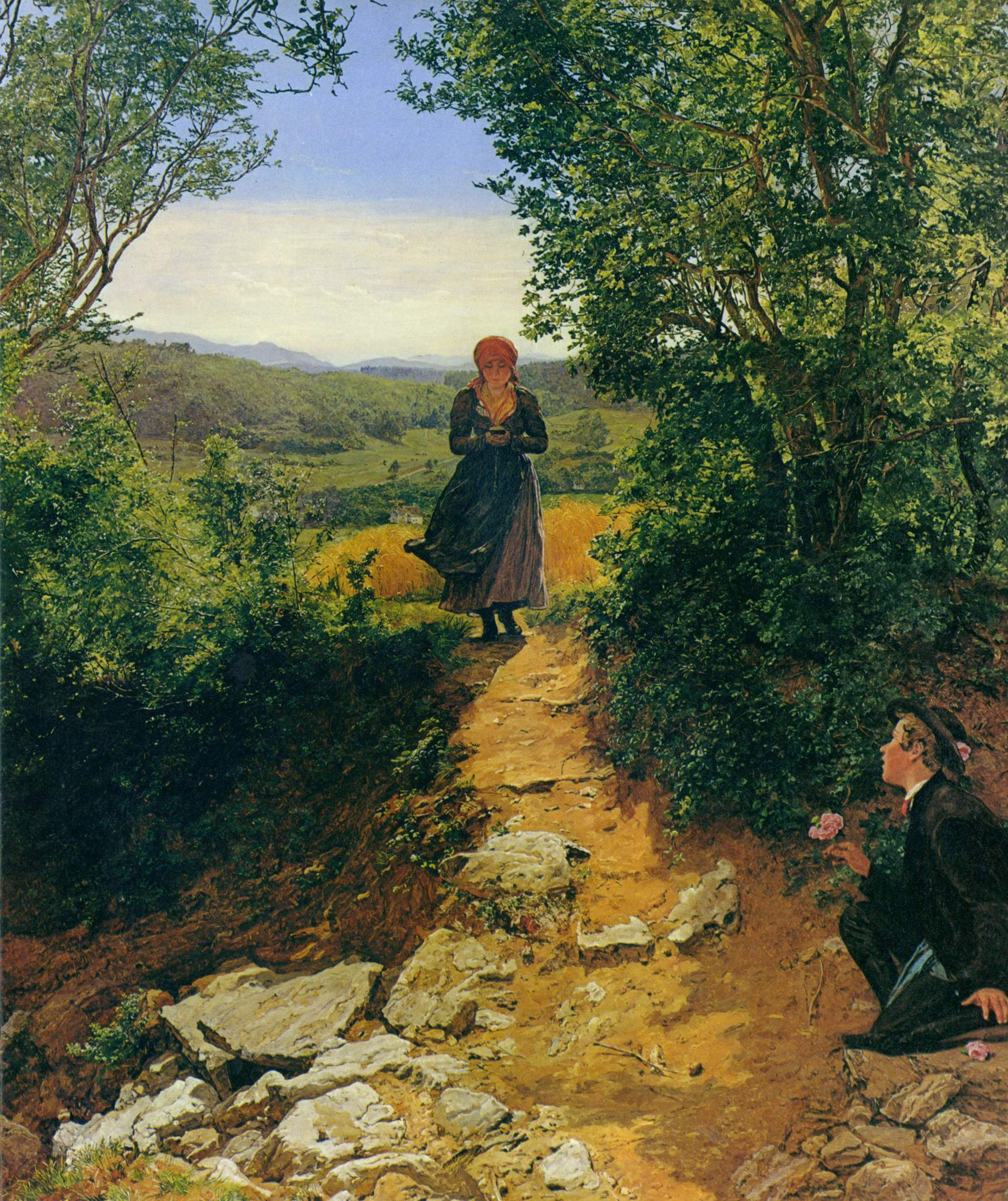
Die Erwartete (The Expected; 1860). Time travel enthusiasts have speculated that this painting depicts a woman holding an iPhone. Art historians have rebutted that the object is a small prayer book common to the era.

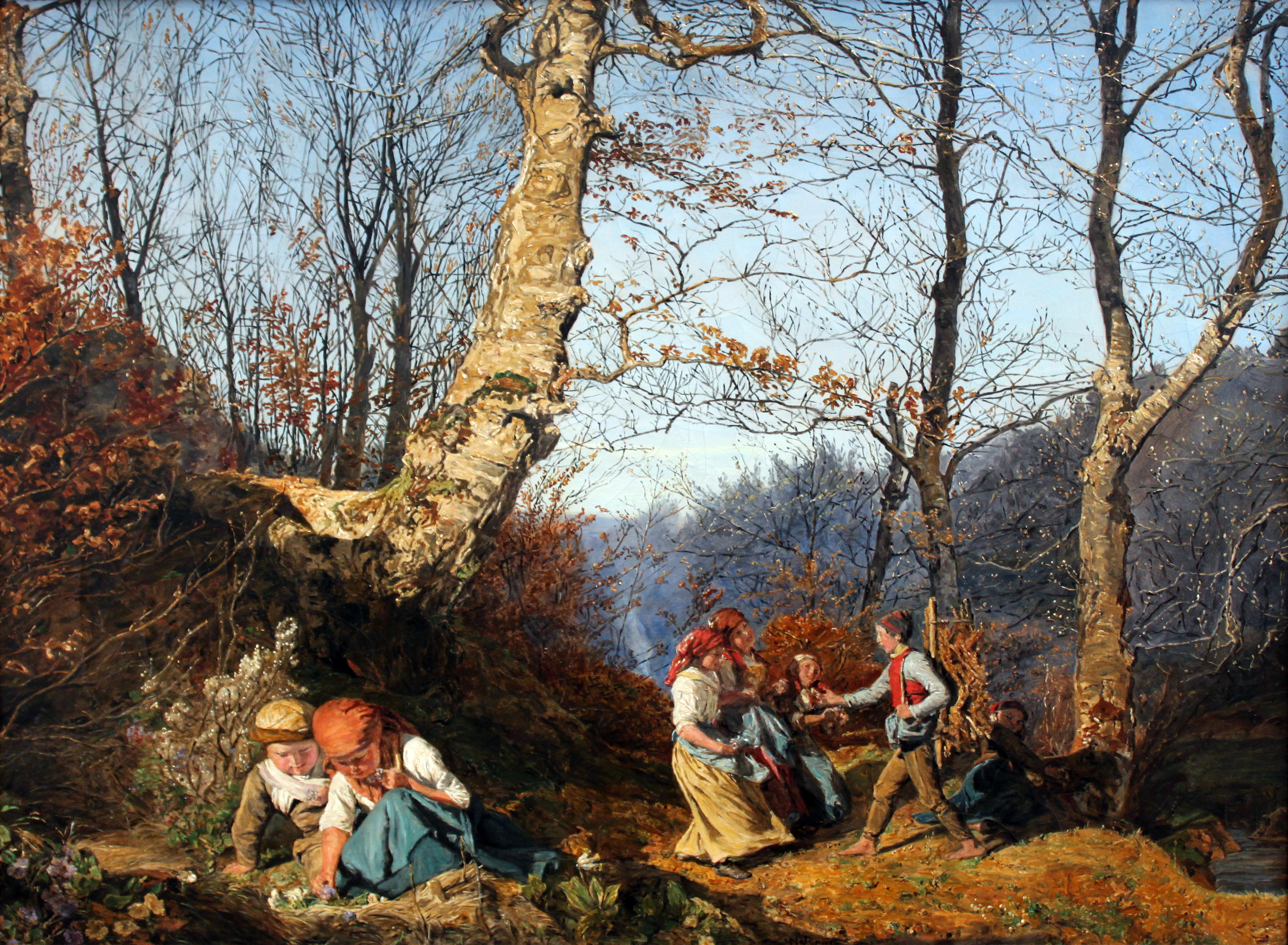
Early spring in Vienna forest (1864)

== See also ==
- List of Orientalist artists
- Orientalism

== Bibliography ==
- Staff (15 June 2009). "Ferdinand Georg Waldmüller Retrospective Opens at The Belvedere". Art Daily.
