= Hesler =

Hesler may refer to:

- Mount Hesler, mount in the Selkirk Mountains of British Columbia, Canada
- Georg Hesler (1427–1482), German Roman Catholic cardinal and bishop
- Lexemuel Ray Hesler (1888–1977), American mycologist
- Nicole Duval Hesler (born 1945), chief justice of Quebec
