= Fesler =

Fesler is a surname. Notable people with the surname include:

- James W. Fesler (1911–2005), American political scientist
- Peter Fesler, American Air Force general
- Wes Fesler (1908–1989), American football, basketball, and baseball player and coach of football and basketball

== See also ==
- Felser
