= Elssler =

Elssler or Elßler is a surname. Notable people with the surname include:

- Fanny Elssler (1810–1884), Austrian ballet dancer, sister of Therese Elssler
- Therese Elssler (1808–1878), Austrian ballet dancer

== See also ==
- Ellsler
