= Minstrel show =

19th- and 20th-century American form of musical theater

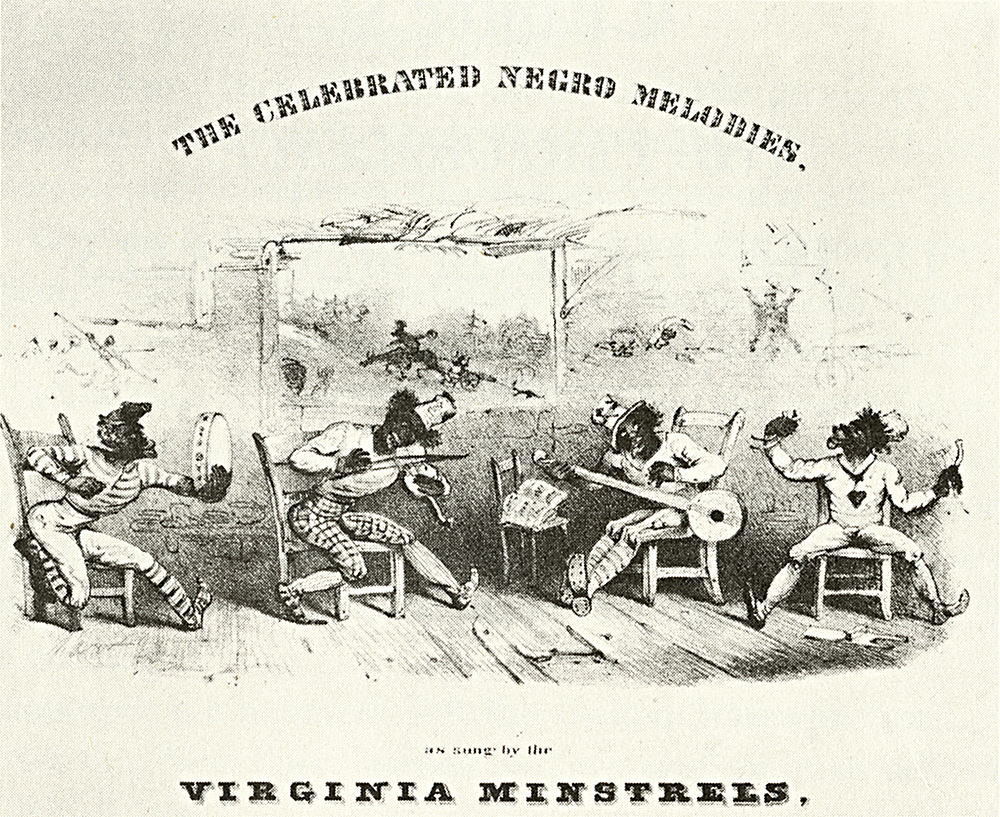
Detail from cover of The Celebrated Negro Melodies, as Sung by the Virginia Minstrels, 1843

A minstrel show, also called minstrelsy, was an American form of theater developed in the early 19th century. The shows were performed by mostly white actors wearing blackface makeup for the purpose of portraying racial stereotypes of African Americans. Minstrel shows stereotyped black people as dimwitted, lazy, buffoonish, greedy, cowardly, superstitious, and happy-go-lucky. The shows were a reflection of racist perceptions that black people were not civilized enough to be treated as equals. After the American Civil War, African American performers formed their own minstrel companies, such as the Georgia Minstrels in the 1860s, adopting blackface and the format to gain economic opportunities in a format whites had dominated, occasionally injecting authenticity or subversion into the caricatures amid ongoing white supremacist sentiments. The humor of minstrel shows often centered on black characters trying to become citizens and comically failing.

Blackface minstrelsy was the first uniquely American form of theater, and for many minstrel shows emerged as brief burlesques and comic entr'actes in the early 1830s in the Northeastern states. They were developed into full-fledged art form in the next decade. By 1848, blackface minstrel shows were the national artform, translating formal art such as opera into popular terms for a general audience. During the 1830s and 1840s at the height of its popularity, it was at the epicenter of the American music industry. For several decades, it provided the means through which American whites viewed black people. On the one hand, it had strong racist aspects; on the other, it afforded white Americans more awareness, albeit distorted, of some aspects of black culture in the United States of America.

During the American Civil War, minstrelsy's popularity declined. By the turn of the 20th century the minstrel show enjoyed but a shadow of its former popularity, having been replaced for the most part by the vaudeville style of theatre. On stage the form survived as professional entertainment until about 1910.

== History ==
=== Early development ===
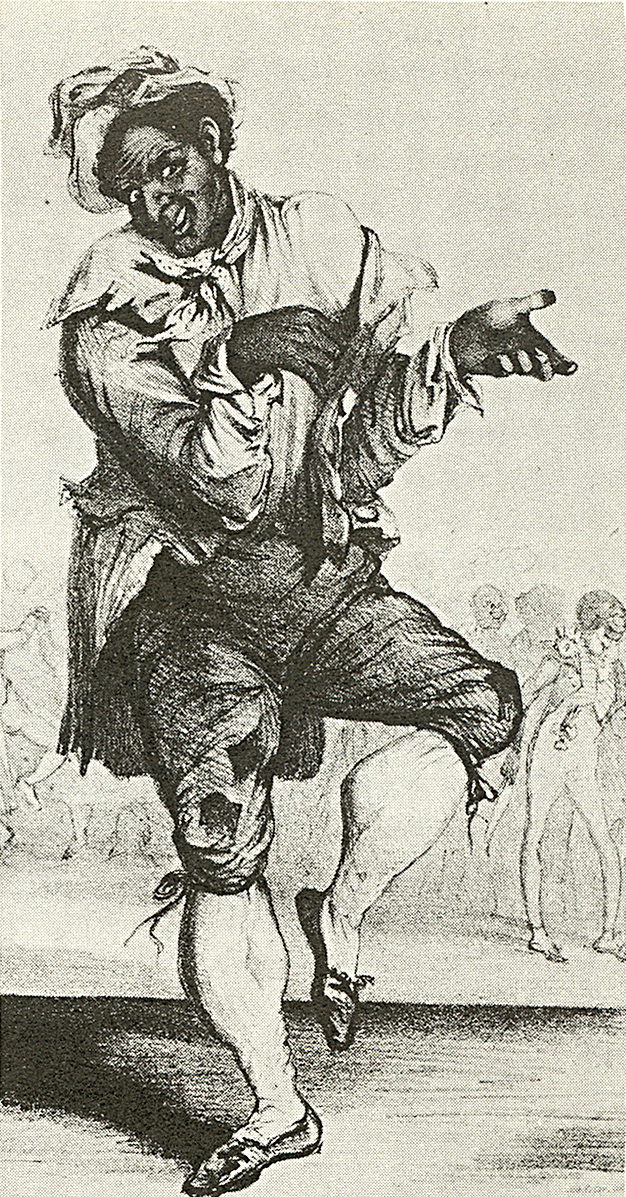
Thomas D. Rice from sheet music cover of "Sich a Getting Up Stairs", 1830s

Minstrel shows were popular before slavery was abolished, sufficiently so that Frederick Douglass described blackface performers as "...the filthy scum of white society, who have stolen from us a complexion denied them by nature, in which to make money, and pander to the corrupt taste of their white fellow citizens." Circus sideshows included Negro performers, minstrels were exhibited in museums, Wild West shows, and in musical ensembles. Black people were also part of traveling medicine shows, which were on the cheaper side of outdoor shows for the paying masses. Such traveling medicine shows also employed a Negro band and minstrels, including both men and women. Museums were set up to appeal to the low income audience, housing freak shows, wax sculptures, as well as exhibits of exoticism, mingled with magic, and necessarily live performance. African Americans were most often displayed as savages, cannibals, or natural freaks.

Although white theatrical portrayals of black characters date back to as early as 1604, the character of Othello being traditionally played by an actor in black makeup, the minstrel show as such has later origins. By the late 18th century, blackface characters began appearing on the American stage, usually as "servant" types whose roles did little more than provide some element of comic relief. Lewis Hallam is frequently cited as the first actor to perform in blackface based on an impression he did of a drunken black man in a 1769 staging of The Padlock. Later research by Cockrell and others disputes this claim. Eventually, similar performers appeared in entr'actes in New York City theaters and other venues such as taverns and circuses. As a result, the blackface "Sambo" character came to supplant the "tall-tale-telling Yankee" and "frontiersman" character-types in popularity, and white actors such as Charles Mathews, George Washington Dixon, and Edwin Forrest began to build reputations as blackface performers. Author Constance Rourke even claimed that Forrest's impression was so good he could fool blacks when he mingled with them in the streets.

Thomas Dartmouth Rice's successful song-and-dance number, "Jump Jim Crow", brought blackface performance to a new level of prominence in the early 1830s. At the height of Rice's success, The Boston Post wrote, "The two most popular characters in the world at the present are [Queen] Victoria of the United Kingdom and Jump Jim Crow." As early as the 1820s, blackface performers called themselves "Ethiopian delineators"; from then into the early 1840s, unlike the later heyday of minstrelsy, they performed either solo or in small teams.

Blackface soon found a home in the taverns of New York's less respectable precincts of Lower Broadway, the Bowery, and Chatham Street. It also appeared on more respectable stages, most often as an entr'acte. Upper-class houses at first limited the number of such acts they would show, but beginning in 1841, blackface performers frequently took to the stage at even the classy Park Theatre, much to the dismay of some patrons. Theater was a participatory activity, and the lower classes came to dominate the playhouse. They threw things at actors or orchestras who performed unpopular material, and rowdy audiences eventually prevented the Bowery Theatre from staging high drama at all. Typical blackface acts of the period were short burlesques, often with mock Shakespearean titles like "Hamlet the Dainty", "Bad Breath, the Crane of Chowder", "Julius Sneezer" or "Dars-de-Money".

Meanwhile, at least some whites were interested in black song and dance by actual black performers. Nineteenth-century New York slaves shingle danced for spare change on their days off, and musicians played what they claimed to be "Negro music" on so-called black instruments like the banjo. The New Orleans Picayune wrote that a singing New Orleans street vendor called Old Corn Meal would bring "a fortune to any man who would start on a professional tour with him". Rice responded by adding a "Corn Meal" skit to his act. Meanwhile, there had been several attempts at legitimate black stage performance, the most ambitious probably being New York's African Grove theater, founded and operated by free blacks in 1821, with a repertoire drawing heavily on Shakespeare. A rival theater company paid people to "riot" and cause disturbances at the theater, and it was shut down by the police when neighbors complained of the commotion.

White, working-class Northerners could identify with the characters portrayed in early blackface performances. This coincided with the rise of groups struggling for workingman's nativism and pro-Southern causes, and faux black performances came to confirm pre-existing racist concepts and to establish new ones. Following a pattern that had been pioneered by Rice, minstrelsy united workers and "class superiors" against a common black enemy, symbolized especially by the character of the black dandy. In this same period, the class-conscious but racially inclusive rhetoric of "wage slavery" was largely supplanted by a racist one of "white slavery". This suggested that the abuses against northern factory workers were a graver ill than the treatment of black slaves—or by a less class-conscious rhetoric of "productive" versus "unproductive" elements of society. On the other hand, views on slavery were fairly evenly presented in minstrelsy, and some songs even suggested the creation of a coalition of working blacks and whites to end the institution.

Among the appeals and racial stereotypes of early blackface performance were the pleasure of the grotesque and its infantilization of blacks. These allowed—by proxy, and without full identification—childish fun and other low pleasures in an industrializing world where workers were increasingly expected to abandon such things.

=== Height ===
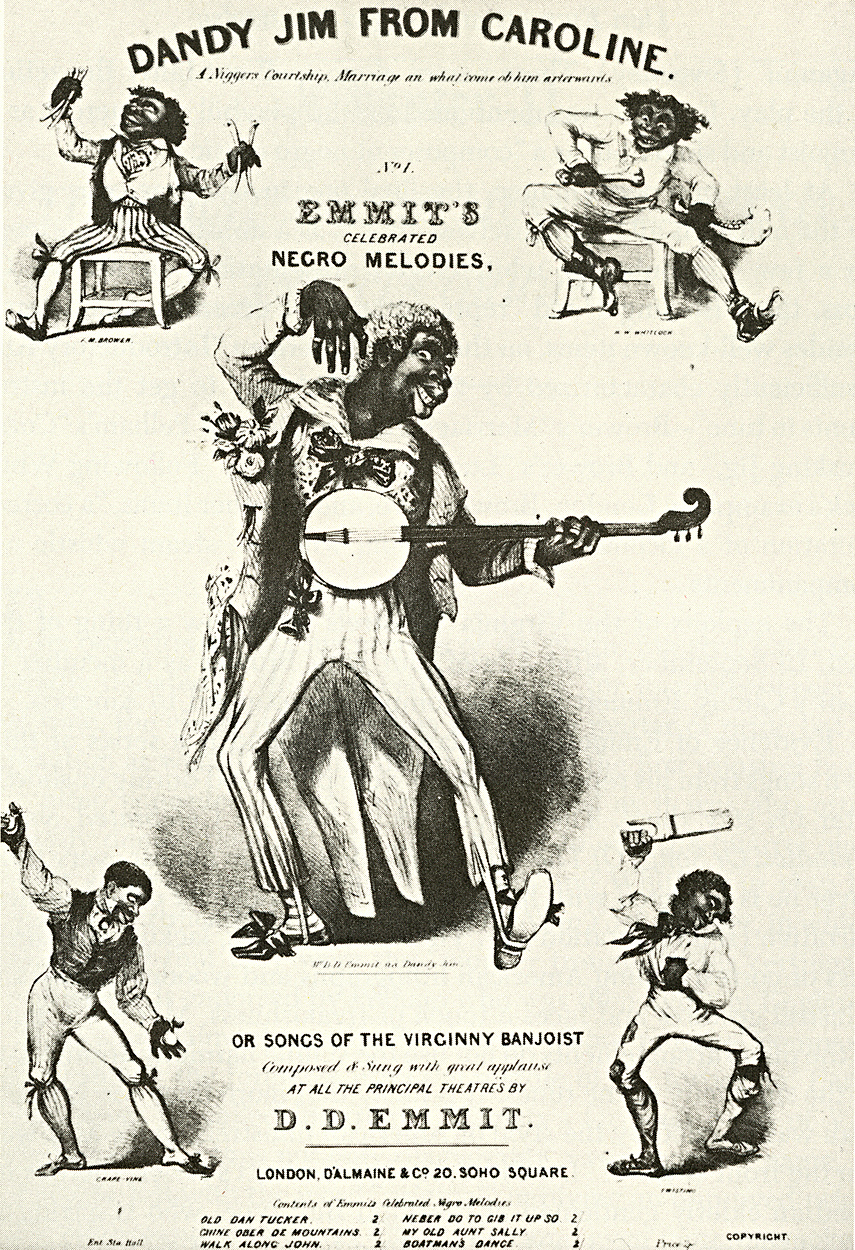
Sheet music cover for "Dandy Jim from Caroline", featuring Dan Emmett (center) and the other Virginia Minstrels, c. 1844

With the Panic of 1837, theater attendance suffered, and concerts were one of the few attractions that could still make money. In 1843, four blackface performers led by Dan Emmett combined to stage just such a concert at the New York Bowery Amphitheatre, calling themselves the Virginia Minstrels. The minstrel show as a complete evening's entertainment was born. The show had little structure. The four sat in a semicircle, played songs, and traded wisecracks. One gave a stump speech in dialect, and they ended with a lively plantation song. The term minstrel had previously been reserved for traveling white singing groups, but Emmett and company made it synonymous with blackface performance, and by using it, signaled that they were reaching out to a new, middle-class audience.

The Herald wrote that the production was "entirely exempt from the vulgarities and other objectionable features, which have hitherto characterized Negro extravaganzas." In 1845, the Ethiopian Serenaders purged their show of low humor and surpassed the Virginia Minstrels in popularity. Shortly thereafter, Edwin Pearce Christy founded Christy's Minstrels, combining the refined singing of the Ethiopian Serenaders (epitomized by the work of Christy's composer Stephen Foster) with the Virginia Minstrels' bawdy schtick. Christy's company established the three-act template into which minstrel shows would fall for the next few decades. This change to respectability prompted theater owners to enforce new rules to make playhouses calmer and quieter.

Minstrels toured the same circuits as opera companies, circuses, and European itinerant entertainers, with venues ranging from lavish opera houses to makeshift tavern stages. Life on the road entailed an "endless series of one-nighters, travel on accident-prone railroads, in poor housing subject to fires, in empty rooms that they had to convert into theaters, arrest on trumped up charges, exposed to deadly diseases, and managers and agents who skipped out with all the troupe's money." The more popular groups stuck to the main circuit that ran through the Northeast; some even went to Europe, which allowed their competitors to establish themselves in their absence. By the late 1840s, a Southern tour had opened from Baltimore to New Orleans. Circuits through the Midwest and as far as California followed by the 1860s. As its popularity increased, theaters sprang up specifically for minstrel performance, often with names such as the Ethiopian Opera House and the like. Many amateur troupes performed only a few local shows before disbanding. Meanwhile, celebrities like Emmett continued to perform solo.

The rise of the minstrel show coincided with the growth of the abolitionist movement. Many Northerners were concerned for the oppressed blacks of the South, but most had no idea how these slaves lived day-to-day. Blackface performance had been inconsistent on this subject; some slaves were happy, others victims of a cruel and inhuman institution. However, in the 1850s, minstrelsy became more pro-slavery as political and satirical content was toned down or removed entirely. Most minstrels projected a greatly romanticized and exaggerated image of black life with cheerful, simple slaves always ready to sing and dance and to please their masters. (Less frequently, the masters cruelly split up black lovers or sexually assaulted black women.) The lyrics and dialogue were generally racist, satiric, and largely white in origin. Songs about slaves yearning to return to their masters were plentiful. Figures like the Northern dandy and the homesick ex-slave reinforced the idea that blacks did not belong, nor did they want to belong, in Northern society.

Adaptations of Uncle Tom's Cabin sprang up rapidly after its publication (all were unlicensed by its author Harriet Beecher Stowe, who refused to sell the theatrical rights for any sum). While all incorporated some elements of minstrelsy, their content varied significantly, from serious productions retaining the book's antislavery message like that of George Aiken's, to minstrel show parodies which generally excised characters such as the cruel master Simon Legree, retaining only the "plantation frolics", differing from earlier minstrel shows only in name, to outright condemnation of Stowe as uninterested in the suffering of the white working class. "Tom shows" continued into the 20th century, continuing to blend the comic aspects of minstrelsy with the more serious plot of the novel.

Minstrelsy's racism (and sexism) could be vicious. There were comic songs in which blacks were "roasted, fished for, smoked like tobacco, peeled like potatoes, planted in the soil, or dried up and hung as advertisements", and there were multiple songs in which a black man accidentally put out a black woman's eyes. On the other hand, the fact that the minstrel show broached the subjects of slavery and race at all is perhaps more significant than the racist manner in which it did so. Despite these pro-plantation attitudes, minstrelsy was banned in many Southern cities. Its association with the North was such that as secessionist attitudes grew stronger, minstrels on Southern tours became convenient targets of anti-Yankee sentiment.

Non-race-related humor came from lampoons of other subjects, including aristocratic whites such as politicians, doctors, and lawyers. Women's rights was another serious subject that appeared with some regularity in antebellum minstrelsy, almost always to ridicule the notion. The women's rights lecture became common in stump speeches. When one character joked, "Jim, I tink de ladies oughter vote", another replied, "No, Mr. Johnson, ladies am supposed to care berry little about polytick, and yet de majority ob em am strongly tached to parties." Minstrel humor was simple and relied heavily on slapstick and wordplay. Performers told riddles: "The difference between a schoolmaster and an engineer is that one trains the mind and the other minds the train."

With the advent of the American Civil War, minstrels remained mostly neutral and satirized both sides. However, as the war reached Northern soil, troupes turned their loyalties to the Union. Sad songs and sketches came to dominate in reflection of the mood of a bereaved nation. Troupes performed skits about dying soldiers and their weeping widows, and about mourning white mothers. "When This Cruel War Is Over" became the hit of the period, selling over a million copies of sheet music. To balance the somber mood, minstrels put on patriotic numbers like "The Star-Spangled Banner", accompanied by depictions of scenes from American history that lionized figures like George Washington and Andrew Jackson. Social commentary grew increasingly important to the show. Performers criticized Northern society and those they felt responsible for the breakup of the country, who opposed reunification, or who profited from a nation at war. Emancipation was either opposed through "happy plantation" material, or mildly supported with pieces that depicted slavery in a negative light. Eventually, direct criticism of the South became more biting.

=== Decline ===
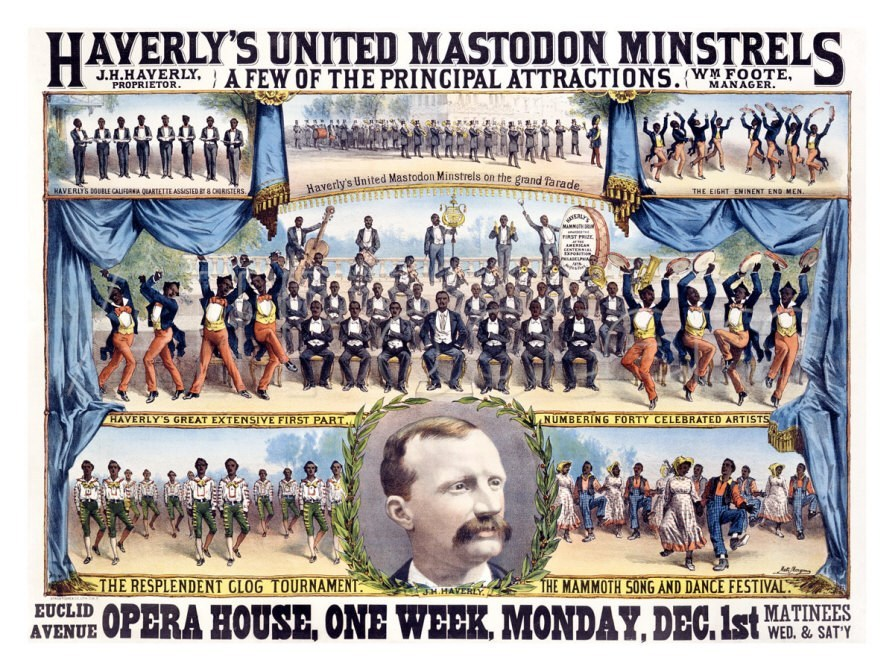
Poster for Haverly's United Mastodon Minstrels

Minstrelsy lost popularity during the Civil War. New entertainments such as variety shows, musical comedies and vaudeville appeared in the North, backed by master promoters like P. T. Barnum who wooed audiences away. Blackface troupes responded by traveling farther and farther afield, with their primary base now in the South and Midwest. By 1883 there were no resident minstrel troupes in New York, only performances by travelling troupes.

Those minstrels who stayed in New York and similar cities followed Barnum's lead by advertising relentlessly and emphasizing spectacle. Troupes ballooned; as many as 19 performers could be on stage at once, and J. H. Haverly's United Mastodon Minstrels had over 100 members. Scenery grew lavish and expensive, and specialty acts such as strongmen, acrobats, or circus freaks sometimes appeared. These changes made minstrelsy unprofitable for smaller troupes. Minstrel troupes, which previously had tended to be owned by performers, now tended to be owned by professional managers such as Haverly.

Other minstrel troupes tried to satisfy different, less socially acceptable tastes. Female acts had made a stir in variety shows, and Madame Rentz's Female Minstrels ran with the idea, first performing in 1870 in skimpy costumes and tights, the scantily clad women being the real attraction. Their success gave rise to at least 11 all-female troupes by 1871, one of which did away with blackface altogether. Ultimately, the girlie show emerged as a form in its own right. Mainstream minstrelsy continued to emphasize its propriety and "fun without vulgarity", but traditional troupes adopted some of these elements in the guise of the female impersonator. A well-played prima donna character, as popularised by the performer Francis Leon, was considered to be critical to success in the postwar period.

This new minstrelsy maintained an emphasis on refined music. Most troupes added jubilees, or spirituals, to their repertoire in the 1870s. These were fairly authentic religious slave songs borrowed from traveling black singing groups. Other troupes drifted further from minstrelsy's roots. When George Primrose and Billy West broke with Haverly's Mastodons in 1877, they did away with blackface for all but the endmen and dressed themselves in lavish finery and powdered wigs. They decorated the stage with elaborate backdrops and performed no slapstick whatsoever. Their brand of minstrelsy differed from other entertainments only in name. Other troupes followed to varying extents, and pre-war style minstrelsy found itself confined to explicitly nostalgic "histories of minstrelsy" features.

Social commentary continued to dominate most performances, with plantation material constituting only a small part of the repertoire. This effect was amplified as minstrelsy featuring black performers took off in its own right and stressed its connection to the old plantations. The main target of criticism was the moral decay of the urbanized North. Cities were painted as corrupt, as homes to unjust poverty, and as dens of "city slickers" who lay in wait to prey upon new arrivals. Minstrels stressed traditional family life; stories told of reunification between mothers and sons thought dead in the war. Women's rights, disrespectful children, low church attendance, and sexual promiscuity became symptoms of decline in family values and of moral decay. Of course, Northern black characters carried these vices even further. African-American members of Congress were one example, pictured as pawns of the Radical Republicans.

By the 1890s, minstrelsy formed only a small part of American entertainment, and, by 1919, a mere three troupes dominated the scene. A key cause was rising salary costs, which for the leading companies had risen from $400 a week in the 1860s to $2500 a week in 1912, far too high to be profitable in most cases, especially with the rise of motion pictures, which could easily outcompete the touring minstrel shows on ticket prices. Small companies and amateurs carried the traditional stage minstrel show into the 20th century, now with an audience mostly in the rural South, while black-owned troupes continued travelling to more outlying areas like the West. These black troupes were one of minstrelsy's last bastions, as more white actors moved into vaudeville. A survey of nine surviving professional minstrel performers in 1947 found a variety of reasons given for the near-total collapse of professional minstrel shows; the rise of motion pictures and other forms of stage show, the inability to recruit performers for minstrel troupes' gruelling tours, and the difficulty of finding theater bookings at a cost cheap enough to make back. None thought changing societal attitudes to race relations played a role in its decline. Community amateur blackface minstrel shows persisted in northern New York State into the 1960s. The University of Vermont banned the minstrel-like Kake Walk as part of the winter Carnival in 1969.

=== Black minstrels ===
Most African Americans who were aware of or directly impacted by minstrel shows strongly disliked or opposed them, viewing them as deeply racist and dehumanizing. However, in the 1840s and '50s, William Henry Lane and Thomas Dilward became the first African Americans to perform on the minstrel stage. All-black troupes followed as early as 1855. These companies emphasized that their ethnicity made them the only true delineators of black song and dance, with one advertisement describing a troupe as "SEVEN SLAVES just from Alabama, who are EARNING THEIR FREEDOM by giving concerts under the guidance of their Northern friends." White curiosity proved a powerful motivator, and the shows were patronized by people who wanted to see blacks acting "spontaneously" and "naturally." Promoters seized on this, one billing his troupe as "THE DARKY AS HE IS AT HOME, DARKY LIFE IN THE CORNFIELD, Canebrake, BARNYARD, AND ON THE LEVEE AND FLATBOAT." Keeping with convention, black minstrels still corked the faces of at least the endmen. One commentator described a mostly uncorked black troupe as "mulattoes of a medium shade except two, who were light. ... The end men were each rendered thoroughly black by burnt cork." The minstrels themselves promoted their performing abilities, quoting reviews that favorably compared them to popular white troupes. These black companies often featured female minstrels.

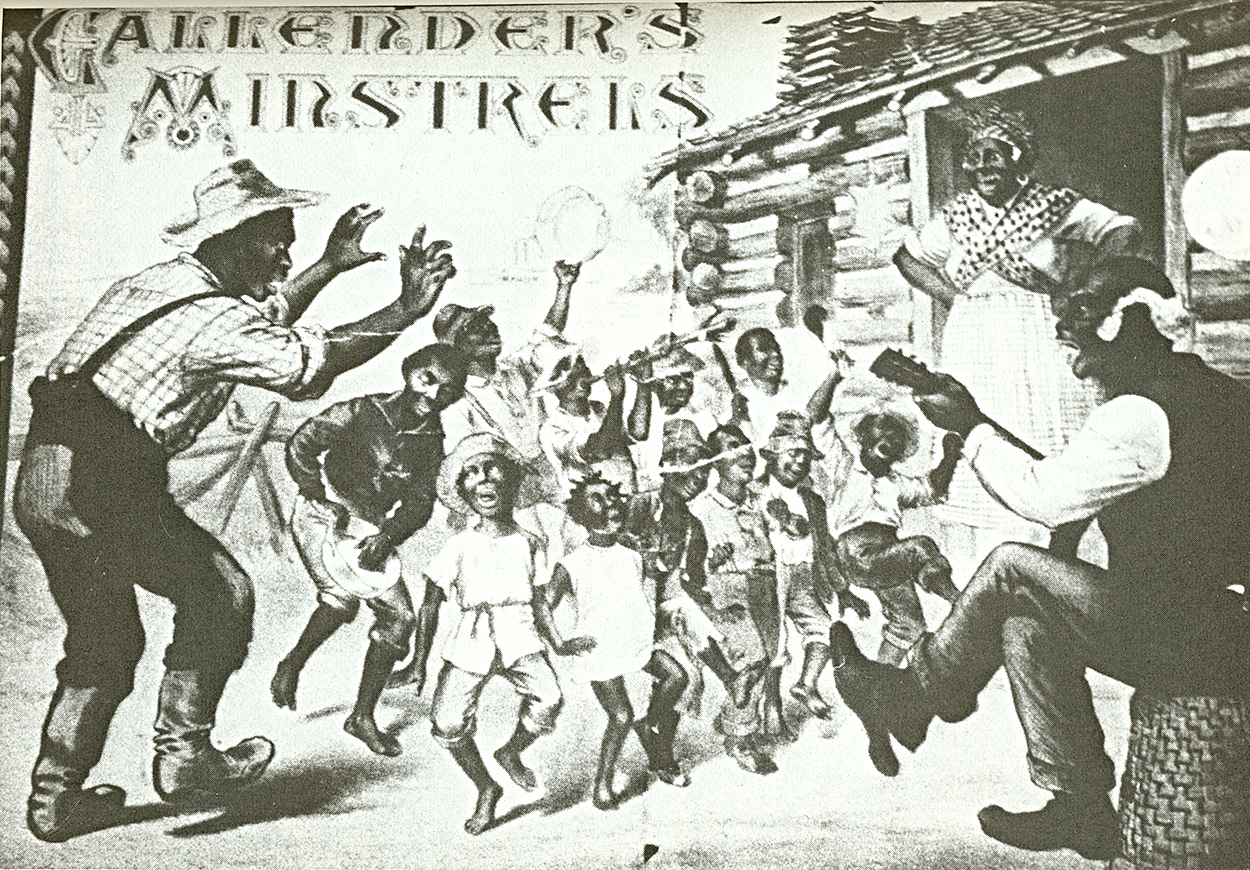
Plantation scenarios were common in black minstrelsy, as shown here in this post-1875 poster for Callender's Colored Minstrels

One or two African-American troupes dominated the scene for much of the late 1860s and 1870s. The first of these was Brooker and Clayton's Georgia Minstrels, who played the Northeast around 1865. Sam Hague's Slave Troupe of Georgia Minstrels formed shortly thereafter and toured England to great success beginning in 1866. In the 1870s, white entrepreneurs bought most of the successful black companies. Charles Callender obtained Sam Hague's troupe in 1872 and renamed it Callender's Georgia Minstrels. They became the most popular black troupe in America, and the words Callender and Georgia came to be synonymous with the institution of black minstrelsy. J. H. Haverly, in turn, purchased Callender's troupe in 1878 and applied his strategy of enlarging troupe size and embellishing sets. When this company went to Europe, Gustave and Charles Frohman took the opportunity to promote their Callender's Consolidated Colored Minstrels. Their success was such that the Frohmans bought Haverly's group and merged it with theirs, creating a virtual monopoly on the market. The company split in three to better canvas the nation and dominated black minstrelsy throughout the 1880s. Individual black performers like Billy Kersands, James A. Bland, Sam Lucas, Martin Francis and Wallace King grew as famous as any featured white performer.

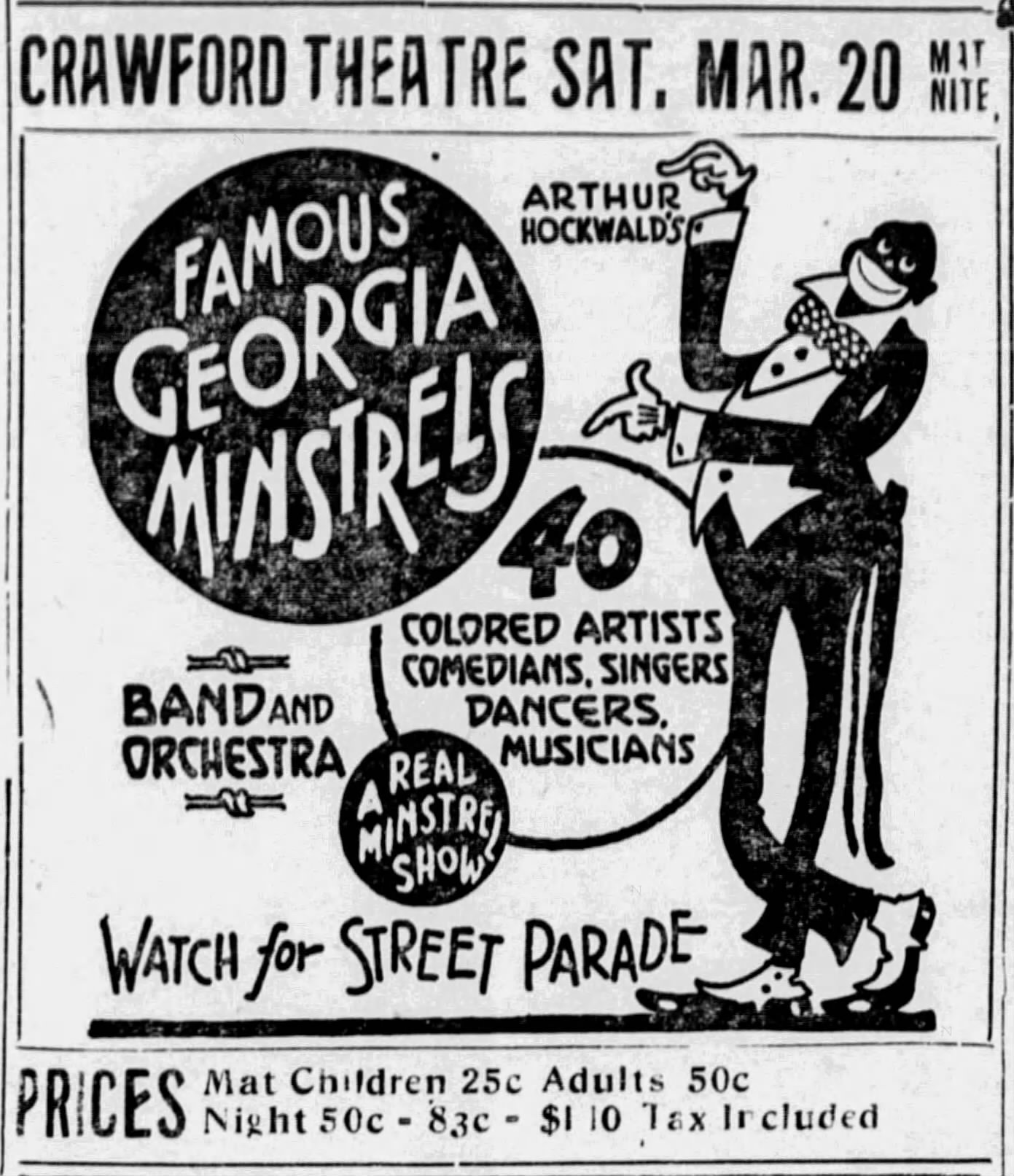
Advertisement in The Negro Star for a "real" minstrel show with Black performers

Racism made black minstrelsy a difficult profession. When playing Southern towns, performers had to stay in character off stage, dressed in ragged "slave clothes" and perpetually smiling. Troupes left town quickly after each performance, and some had so much trouble securing lodging that they hired whole trains or had custom sleeping cars built, complete with hidden compartments to hide in should things turn ugly. Even these were no haven, as whites sometimes used the cars for target practice. Their salaries, though higher than those of most blacks of the period, failed to reach levels earned by white performers; even superstars like Kersands earned slightly less than featured white minstrels. Most black troupes did not last long.

In content, early black minstrelsy differed little from its white counterpart. As the white troupes drifted from plantation subjects in the mid-1870s however, black troupes placed a new emphasis on it. The addition of jubilee singing gave black minstrelsy a popularity boost as the black troupes were rightly believed to be the most authentic performers of such material. Other significant differences were that the black minstrels added religious themes to their shows while whites shied from them, and that the black companies commonly ended the first act of the show with a military high-stepping, brass band burlesque, a practice adopted after Callender's Minstrels used it in 1875 or 1876. Although black minstrelsy lent credence to racist ideals of blackness, many African-American minstrels worked to subtly alter these stereotypes and to poke fun at white society. One jubilee described heaven as a place "where de white folks must let the darkeys be" and they could not be "bought and sold". In plantation material, aged black characters were rarely reunited with long-lost masters like they were in white minstrelsy.

African Americans formed a large part of the black minstrels' audience, especially for smaller troupes. In fact, their numbers were so great that many theater owners had to relax rules relegating black patrons to certain areas. The reasons for the popularity of this openly racist form of entertainment with black audiences have long been debated by historians. Perhaps they felt in on the joke, laughing at the over-the-top characters from a sense of "in-group recognition". Maybe they felt some connection to elements of an African culture that had been suppressed but was visible, albeit in racist, exaggerated form, in minstrel personages. They certainly got many jokes that flew over whites' heads or registered as only quaint distractions. An undeniable draw for black audiences was simply seeing fellow African Americans on stage; black minstrels were largely viewed as celebrities. Formally educated African Americans, on the other hand, either disregarded black minstrelsy or openly disdained it. Still, black minstrelsy was the first large-scale opportunity for African Americans to enter American show business. Black minstrels were therefore viewed as a success. Pat H. Chappelle capitalized on this and created the first totally black-owned black vaudeville show, The Rabbit's Foot Company, which performed with an all-black cast that elevated the level of shows with sophisticated and fun comedy. It successfully toured mainly the Southwest and Southeast, as well as in New Jersey and New York City.

== Structure ==
The Christy Minstrels established the basic structure of the minstrel show in the 1840s. A crowd-gathering parade to the theater often preceded the performance. The show itself was divided into three major sections. During the first, the entire troupe danced onto stage singing a popular song. Upon the instruction of the interlocutor, a sort of host, they sat in a semicircle. Various stock characters always took the same positions: the genteel interlocutor in the middle, flanked by Mr Tambo and Mr Bones, who served as the endmen or cornermen. The interlocutor acted as a master of ceremonies and as a dignified, if pompous, straight man. He had a somewhat aristocratic demeanor, a "codfish aristocrat", while the endmen exchanged jokes and performed a variety of humorous songs. Over time, the first act came to include maudlin numbers not always in dialect. One minstrel, usually a tenor, came to specialize in this part; such singers often became celebrities, especially with women. Initially, an upbeat plantation song and dance ended the act; later it was more common for the first act to end with a walkaround, including dances in the style of a cakewalk.

The second portion of the show, called the olio, was historically the last to evolve, as its real purpose was to allow for the setting of the stage for act three behind the curtain. It had more of a variety show structure. Performers danced, played instruments, did acrobatics, and demonstrated other amusing talents. Troupes offered parodies of European-style entertainments, and European troupes themselves sometimes performed. The highlight was when one actor, typically one of the endmen, delivered a faux-black-dialect stump speech, a long oration about anything from nonsense to science, society, or politics, during which the dim-witted character tried to speak eloquently, only to deliver countless malapropisms, jokes, and unintentional puns. All the while, the speaker moved about like a clown, standing on his head and almost always falling off his stump at some point. With blackface makeup serving as fool's mask, these stump speakers could deliver biting social criticism without offending the audience, although the focus was usually on sending up unpopular issues and making fun of blacks' inability to make sense of them. Many troupes employed a stump specialist with a trademark style and material.

"A Meeting of the Limkiln Club"
A blackface stump speech by the American Quartet, 1902

The afterpiece rounded out the production. In the early days of the minstrel show, this was often a skit set on a Southern plantation that usually included song-and-dance numbers and featured Sambo- and Mammy-type characters in slapstick situations. The emphasis lay on an idealized plantation life and the happy slaves who lived there. Nevertheless, antislavery viewpoints sometimes surfaced in the guise of family members separated by slavery, runaways, or even slave uprisings. A few stories highlighted black trickster figures who managed to get the better of their masters. Beginning in the mid-1850s, performers did burlesque renditions of other plays; both Shakespeare and contemporary playwrights were common targets. The humor of these came from the inept black characters trying to perform some element of high white culture. Slapstick humor pervaded the afterpiece, including cream pies to the face, inflated bladders, and on-stage fireworks. Material from Uncle Tom's Cabin dominated beginning in 1853. The afterpiece allowed the minstrels to introduce new characters, some of whom became quite popular and spread from troupe to troupe.

== Characters ==
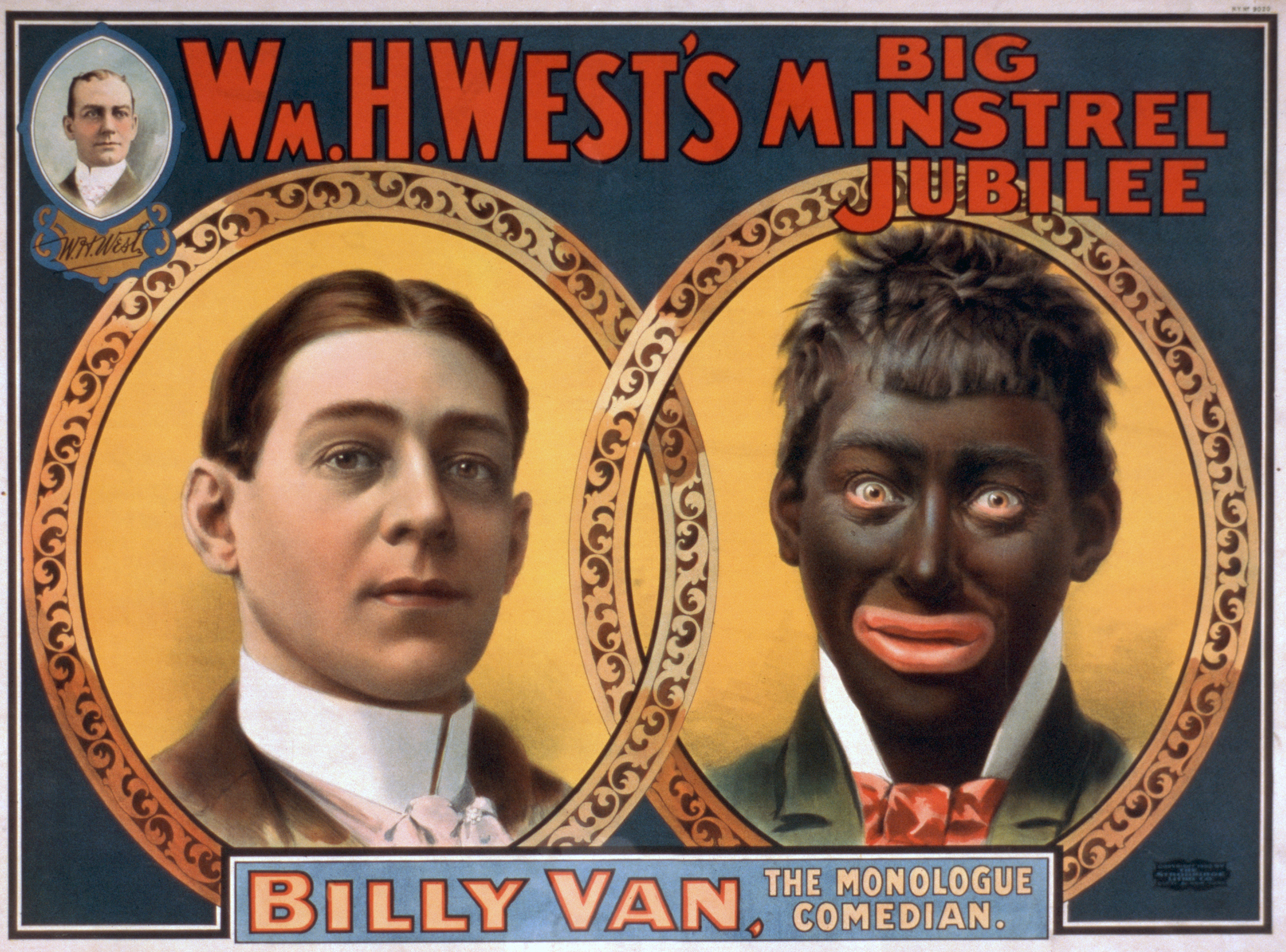
This reproduction of a 1900 minstrel show poster, originally published by the Strobridge Litho Co., shows the blackface transformation from white to "black"

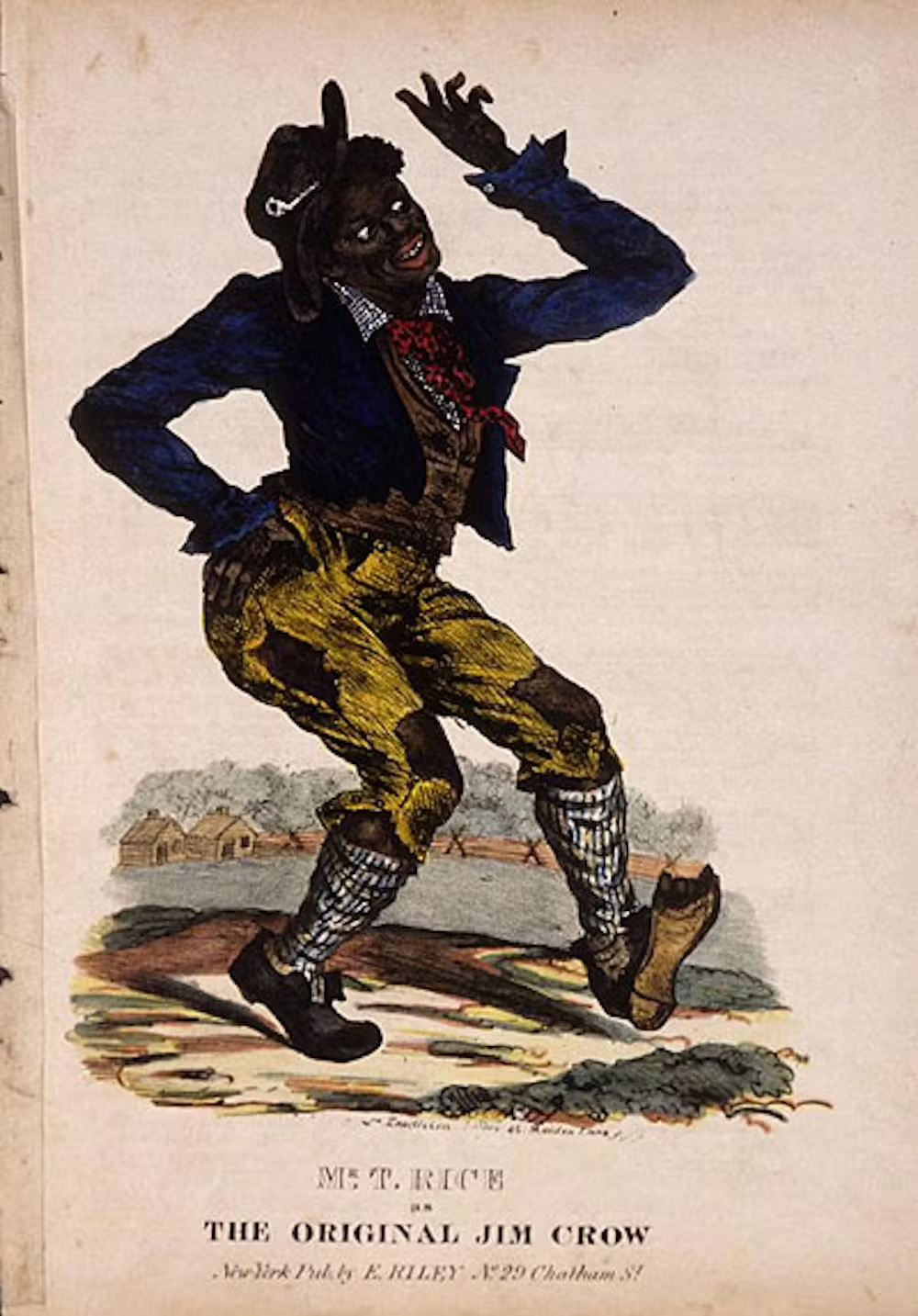
Jim Crow, the archetypal slave character as created by Rice

The earliest minstrel characters took as their base popular white stage archetypes—frontiersmen, fishermen, hunters, and riverboatsmen whose depictions drew heavily from the tall tale—and added exaggerated blackface speech and makeup. These Jim Crows and Gumbo Chaffs fought and boasted that they could "wip [their] weight in wildcats" or "eat an alligator". As public opinion toward blacks changed, however, so did the minstrel stereotypes. Eventually, several stock characters emerged. Chief among these were the slave, who often maintained the earlier name Jim Crow, and the dandy, known frequently as Zip Coon, from the song "Zip Coon". "First performed by George Dixon in 1834, Zip Coon made a mockery of free blacks. An arrogant, ostentatious figure, he dressed in high style and spoke in a series of malaprops and puns that undermined his attempts to appear dignified."

The white actors who portrayed these characters spoke an exaggerated form of Black Vernacular English. The blackface makeup and illustrations on programs and sheet music depicted them with huge eyeballs, very wide noses, and thick-lipped mouths that hung open or grinned foolishly; one character expressed his love for a woman with "lips so large a lover could not kiss them all at once". They had huge feet and preferred "possum" and "coon" to more civilized fare. Minstrel characters were often described in animalistic terms, with "wool" instead of hair, "bleating" like sheep, and having "darky cubs" instead of children. Other claims were that blacks had to drink ink when they got sick "to restore their color" and that they had to file their hair rather than cut it. They were inherently musical, dancing and frolicking through the night with no need for sleep.

Thomas "Daddy" Rice introduced the earliest slave archetype with his song "Jump Jim Crow" and its accompanying dance. He claimed to have learned the number by watching an old, limping black stable hand dancing and singing, "Wheel about and turn about and do jus' so/Eb'ry time I wheel about I jump Jim Crow." Other early minstrel performers quickly adopted Rice's character.

Slave characters in general came to be low-comedy types with names that matched the instruments they played: Brudder Tambo (or simply Tambo) for the tambourine and Brudder Bones (or Bones) for the bone castanets or bones. These endmen (for their position in the minstrel semicircle) were ignorant and poorly spoken, being conned, electrocuted, or run over in various sketches. They happily shared their stupidity; one slave character said that to get to China, one had only to go up in a balloon and wait for the world to rotate below. Highly musical and unable to sit still, they constantly contorted their bodies wildly while singing.

Tambo and Bones's simple-mindedness and lack of sophistication were highlighted by pairing them with a straight man master of ceremonies called the interlocutor. This character, although usually in blackface, spoke in aristocratic English and used a much larger vocabulary. The humor of these exchanges came from the misunderstandings on the part of the endmen when talking to the interlocutor:

Interlocutor: "I'm astonished at you, Why, the idea of a man of your mental caliber talking about such sordid matters, right after listening to such a beautiful song! Have you no sentiment left?"
Tambo: "No, I haven't got a cent left."

Tambo and Bones were favorites of the audience, and their repartee with the interlocutor was for many the best part of the show. There was an element of laughing with them for the audience, as they frequently made light of the interlocutor's grandiose ways.

The interlocutor was responsible for beginning and ending each segment of the show. To this end, he had to be able to gauge the mood of the audience and know when it was time to move on. Accordingly, the actor who played the role was paid very well in comparison to other non-featured performers.

There were many variants on the slave archetype. The old darky or old uncle formed the head of the idyllic black family. Like other slave characters, he was highly musical and none-too-bright, but he had favorable aspects like his loving nature and the sentiments he raised regarding love for the aged, ideas of old friendships, and the cohesiveness of the family. His death and the pain it caused his master was a common theme in sentimental songs. Alternatively, the master could die, leaving the old darky to mourn. Stephen Foster's "Old Uncle Ned" was the most popular song on this subject. Less frequently, the old darky might be cast out by a cruel master when he grew too old to work. After the Civil War, this character became the most common figure in plantation sketches. He frequently cried about the loss of his home during the war, only to meet up with someone from the past such as the child of his former master. In contrast, the trickster, often called Jasper Jack, appeared less frequently.

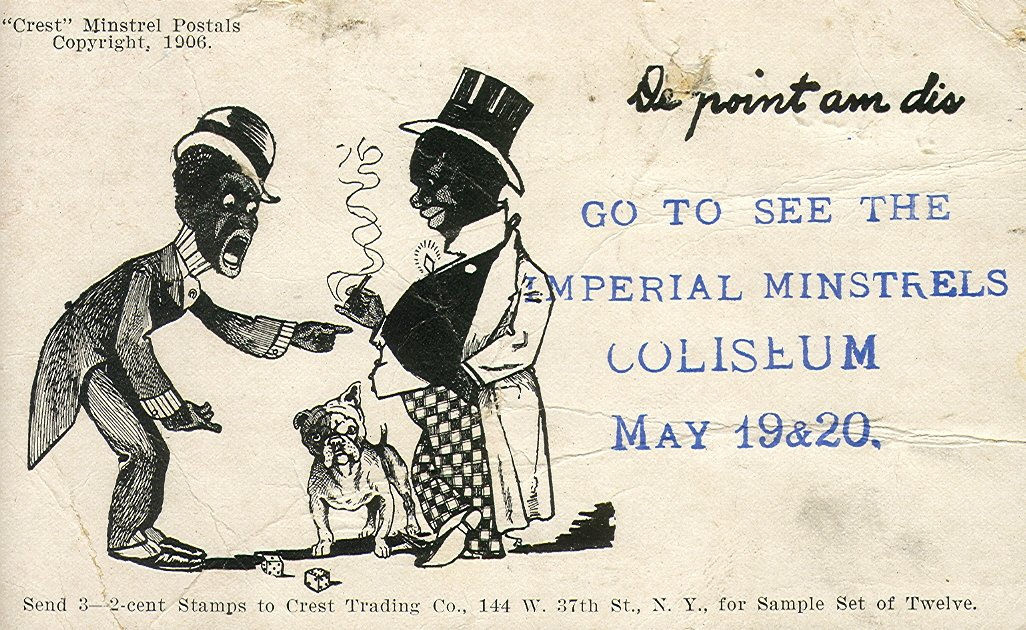
1906 postcard advertisement featuring dandy-type characters

The counterpart to the slave was the dandy, a common character in the afterpiece. He was a Northern, urban black man trying to live above his station by mimicking white, upper-class speech and dress—usually to no good effect. Dandy characters often went by Zip Coon, after the song popularized by George Washington Dixon, although others had pretentious names like Count Julius Caesar Mars Napoleon Sinclair Brown. Their clothing was a ludicrous parody of upper-class dress: coats with tails and padded shoulders, white gloves, monocles, fake mustaches, and gaudy watch chains. They spent their time primping and preening, going to parties, dancing and strutting, and wooing women.

=== Soldier ===
The black soldier became another stock type during the Civil War and merged qualities of the slave and the dandy. He was acknowledged for playing some role in the war, but he was more frequently lampooned for bumbling through his drills or for thinking his uniform made him the equal of his white counterparts. He was usually better at retreating than fighting, and, like the dandy, he preferred partying to serious pursuits. Still, his introduction allowed for some return to themes of the breakup of the plantation family.

=== Female ===
Female characters ranged from the sexually provocative to the laughable. These roles were almost always played by men in drag (most famously George Christy, Francis Leon and Barney Williams), even though American theater outside minstrelsy was filled with actresses at this time. Mammy or the old auntie was the old darky's counterpart. She often went by the name of Aunt Dinah Roh after the song of that title. Mammy was lovable to both blacks and whites, matronly, but hearkening to European peasant woman sensibilities. Her main role was to be the devoted mother figure in scenarios about the perfect plantation family.

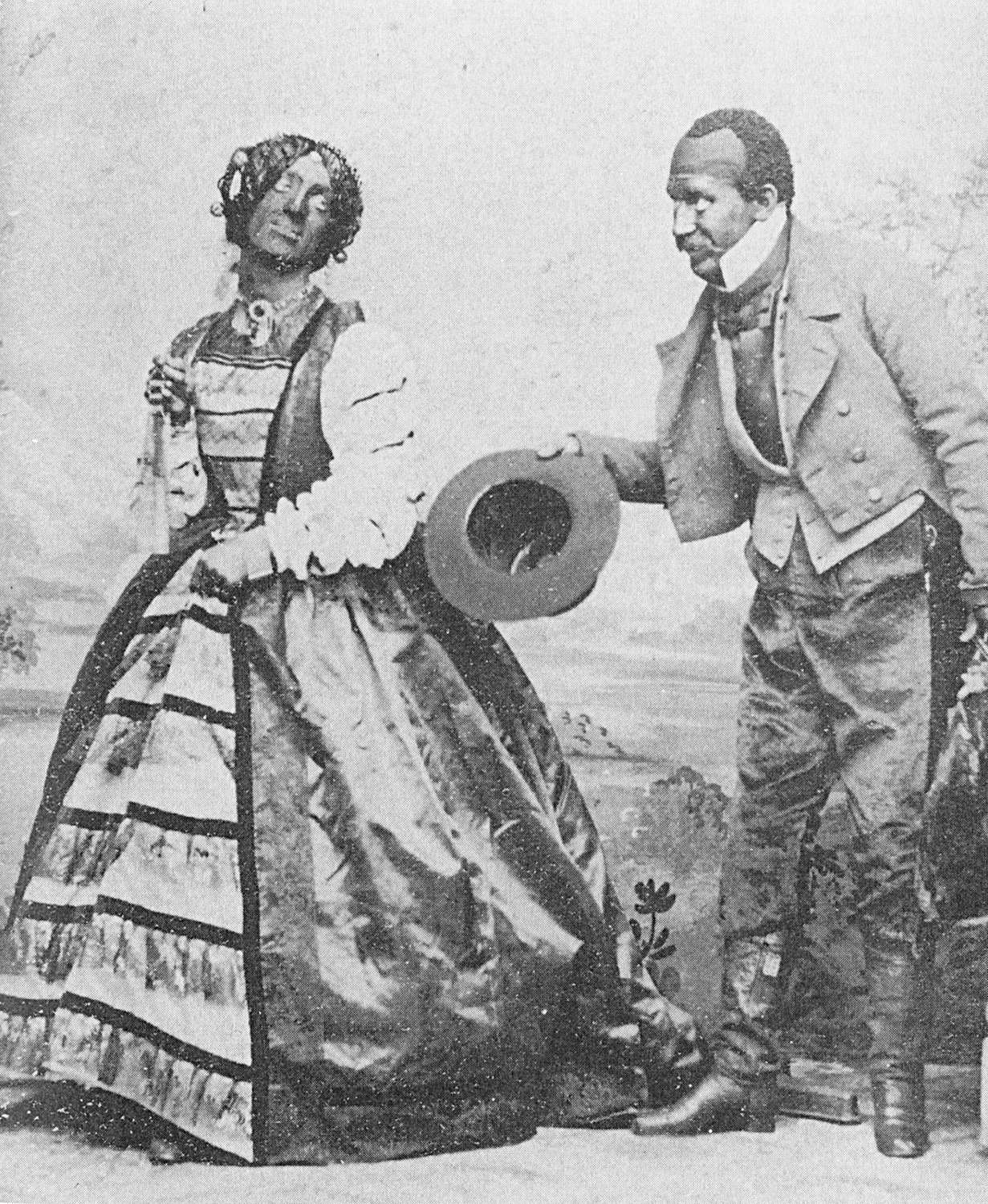
Minstrel show performers Rollin Howard (in wench costume) and George Griffin, c. 1855

The wench, yaller gal or prima donna was a mulatto who combined the light skin and facial features of a white woman with the perceived sexual promiscuity and exoticism of a black woman. Her beauty and flirtatiousness made her a common target for male characters, although she usually proved capricious and elusive. After the Civil War, the wench emerged as the most important specialist role in the minstrel troupe; men could alternately be titillated and disgusted, while women could admire the illusion and high fashion. The role was most strongly associated with the song "Miss Lucy Long", so the character many times bore that name. Actress Olive Logan commented that some actors were "marvelously well fitted by nature for it, having well-defined soprano voices, plump shoulders, beardless faces, and tiny hands and feet." Many of these actors were teen-aged boys. In contrast was the funny old gal, a slapstick role played by a large man in motley clothing and large, flapping shoes. The humor she invoked often turned on the male characters' desire for a woman whom the audience would perceive as unattractive.

=== Non-black ===
Non-black stereotypes played a significant role in minstrelsy, and, although still performed in blackface, were distinguished by their lack of black dialect.

==== Native American ====
American Indians before the Civil War were usually depicted as innocent symbols of the pre-industrial world or as pitiable victims whose peaceful existence had been shattered by the encroachment of the white man. However, as the United States turned its attentions West, American Indians became savage, pagan obstacles to progress. These characters were formidable scalpers to be feared, not ridiculed; any humor in such scenarios usually derived from a black character trying to act like one of the frightful savages. One sketch began with white men and American Indians enjoying a communal meal in a frontier setting. As the American Indians became intoxicated, they grew more and more antagonistic, and the army ultimately had to intervene to prevent the massacre of the whites. Even favorably presented American Indian characters usually died tragically.

==== East Asian ====
Depictions of East Asians began during the California Gold Rush when minstrels encountered Chinese out West. John Chinaman minstrel songs arising in the 1850s depicted the stock character of John Chinaman as effeminate and unmanly, often centering on the stock character's failed pursuit of white women. Minstrels caricatured East Asians by their strange language ("ching chang chung"), odd eating habits (dogs and cats), and propensity for wearing pigtails. Parodies of Japanese became popular when a Japanese acrobat troupe toured the United States beginning in 1865. A run of Gilbert and Sullivan's The Mikado in the mid-1880s inspired another wave of Asian characterizations.

==== White ====
The few white characters in minstrelsy were stereotypes of immigrant groups like the Irish and Germans. Irish characters first appeared in the 1840s, portrayed as hotheaded, odious drunkards who spoke in a thick brogue. However, beginning in the 1850s, many Irishmen joined minstrelsy, and Irish theatergoers probably came to represent a significant part of the audience, so this negative image was muted. Germans, on the other hand, were portrayed favorably from their introduction to minstrelsy in the 1860s. They were responsible and sensible, though still portrayed as humorous for their large size, hearty appetites, and heavy "Dutch" accents. Part of this positive portrayal no doubt came about because some of the actors portraying German characters were German themselves.

== Music and dance ==
A complete minstrel show, c.1899

"Minstrelsy evolved from several different American entertainment traditions; the traveling circus, medicine shows, shivaree, Irish dance and music with African syncopated rhythms, musical halls and traveling theatre." Music and dance were the heart of the minstrel show and a large reason for its popularity. Around the time of the 1830s, there was a lot of national conflict as to how people viewed African Americans. Because of that interest in the Negro people, these songs granted the listener new knowledge about African Americans, who were different from themselves, even if the information was prejudiced. Troupes took advantage of this interest and marketed sheet music of the songs they featured so that viewers could enjoy them at home and other minstrels could adopt them for their act.

Early blackface songs often consisted of unrelated verses strung together by a common chorus. In this pre-Emmett minstrelsy, the music "jangled the nerves of those who believed in music that was proper, respectable, polished, and harmonic, with recognizable melodies." It was thus a juxtaposition of "vigorous earth-slapping footwork of black dances … with the Irish lineaments of blackface jigs and reels." Similar to the look of a blackface performer, the lyrics in the songs that were sung have a tone of mockery and a spirit of laughing at black Americans rather than with them. The minstrel show texts sometimes mixed black lore, such as stories about talking animals or slave tricksters, with humor from the region southwest of the Appalachians, itself a mixture of traditions from different races and cultures. Minstrel instruments were also a mélange: African banjo and tambourine with European fiddle and bones. In short, early minstrel music and dance was not true black culture; it was a white reaction to it. This was the first large-scale appropriation and commercial exploitation of black culture by American whites.

In the late 1830s, a decidedly European structure and high-brow style became popular in minstrel music. The banjo, played with "scientific touches of perfection" and popularized by Joel Sweeney, became the heart of the minstrel band. Songs like the Virginia Minstrels' hit "Old Dan Tucker" have a catchy tune and energetic rhythm, melody and harmony; minstrel music was now for singing as well as dancing. The Spirit of the Times even described the music as vulgar because it was "entirely too elegant" and that the "excellence" of the singing "[was] an objection to it." Others complained that the minstrels had foregone their black roots. In short, the Virginia Minstrels and their imitators wanted to please a new audience of predominantly white, middle-class Northerners, by playing music the spectators would find familiar and pleasant.

The songs were called "plantation melodies" or "Ethiopian choruses", among other names. By using the black caricatures and so-called black music, the minstrels added a touch of the unknown to the evening's entertainment, which was enough to fool audiences into accepting the whole performance as authentic.

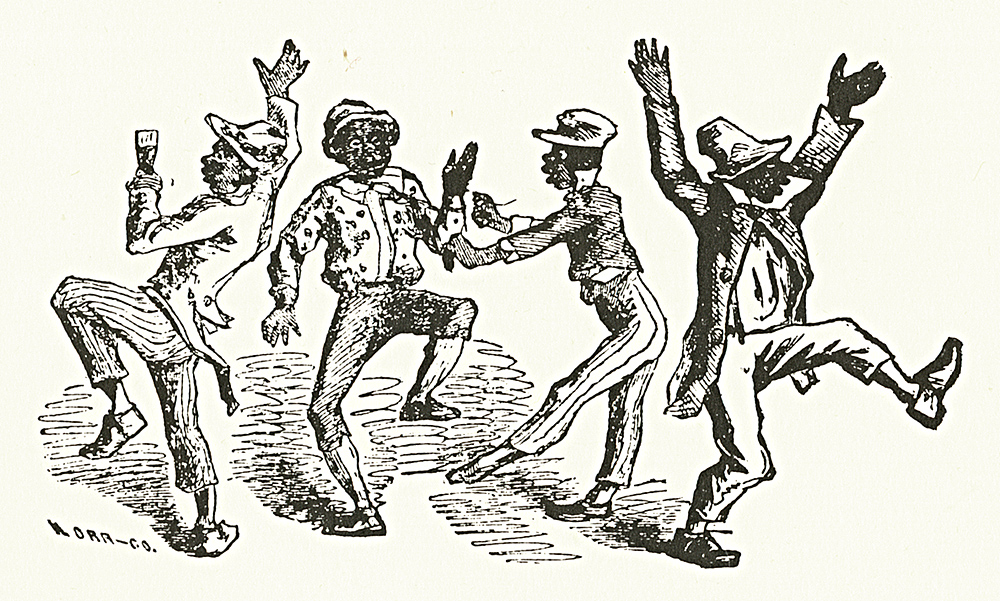
Detail from an 1859 playbill of Bryant's Minstrels depicting the final part of the walk around

The minstrels' dance styles, on the other hand, were much truer to their alleged source. The success of "Jump Jim Crow" is indicative: It was an old English tune with fairly standard lyrics, which leaves only Rice's dance—wild upper-body movements with little movement below the waist—to explain its popularity. Dances like the Turkey Trot, the Buzzard Lope, and the Juba dance all had their origins in the plantations of the South, and some were popularized by black performers such as William Henry Lane, Signor Cornmeali ("Old Corn Meal"), and John "Picayune" Butler. One performance by Lane in 1842 was described as consisting of "sliding steps, like a shuffle, and not the high steps of an Irish jig." Lane and the white men who mimicked him moved about the stage with no obvious foot movement. The walk around, a common feature of the minstrel show's first act, was ultimately of West African origin and featured a competition between individuals hemmed in by the other minstrels. Elements of white tradition remained, of course, such as the fast-paced breakdown that formed part of the repertoire beginning with Rice. Minstrel dance was generally not held to the same mockery as other parts, although contemporaries such as Fanny Kemble argued that minstrel dances were merely a "faint, feeble, impotent—in a word, pale Northern reproductions of that ineffable black conception."

The introduction of the jubilee, or spiritual, marked the minstrels' first undeniable adoption of black music. These songs remained relatively authentic in nature, antiphonal with a repetitive structure that relied heavily on call and response. The black troupes sang the most authentic jubilees, while white companies inserted humorous verses and replaced religious themes with plantation imagery, often starring the old darky. Jubilee eventually became synonymous with plantation.

=== Composers ===
In the 1840s, Stephen Foster's music became the backbone of the minstrel show, with songs like "Oh! Susanna", "Camptown Races" and "Old Folks at Home", the latter now being the state song of Florida (and anthem, with revised lyrics). Dan Emmett, founder of the Virginia Minstels, also composed songs like "Old Dan Tucker" and "Dixie", the unofficial anthem of the Confederacy, which were popular in this period.

=== Influences ===
How much influence black music had on minstrel performance remains a debated topic. Minstrel music certainly contained some element of black culture, added onto a base of European tradition with distinct Irish and Scottish folk music influences. According to the historian of music Larry Birnbaum, minstrel music primarily originated from English, Scottish, and Irish folk music. Musicologist Dale Cockrell argues that early minstrel music mixed both African and European traditions and that distinguishing black and white urban music during the 1830s is impossible. Insofar as the minstrels had authentic contact with black culture, it was via neighborhoods, taverns, theaters and waterfronts where blacks and whites could mingle freely. The inauthenticity of the music and the Irish and Scottish elements in it are explained by the fact that slaves were rarely allowed to play native African music and therefore had to adopt and adapt elements of European folk music. Compounding the problem is the difficulty in ascertaining how much minstrel music was written by black composers, as the custom at the time was to sell all rights to a song to publishers or other performers. Nevertheless, many troupes claimed to have carried out more serious "fieldwork".

Many late-19th to early 20th century composers and musicians were involved in minstrelsy, in particular African Americans such as Scott Joplin, W.C. Handy, Ma Rainey, and other blues and jazz artists.

== Legacy ==
While the minstrel stage show largely disappeared as professional entertainment in the 20^{th} century, the minstrel show format itself transferred virtually intact to the modern media of radio, records, film and even early television. First came sound recordings which replicated the first act of the minstrel show (called the “Minstrel First Part’), and which were extremely popular in the 1890s and early 1900s. Virtually every record company produced them, and the two largest labels in America, Victor and Columbia, had pages of them in their catalogs. In 1902/1903 both labels produced multi-disc (and cylinder) sets which, when played back-to-back, reproduced an entire show with all three acts and most of the characteristic elements, i.e. stump speeches, endmen jokes, etc. In the 1920s as radio began to spread full minstrel shows were among the most popular shows, for example Daily Paskman’s Radio Minstrels in the Northeast (1925-1928), and Dutch Masters Minstrels (1928-1932) and Sinclair Minstrels (1932-1937) on the NBC radio network, the latter being a top ten show with millions of listeners. Even Perry Como staged a minstrel show as part of his popular series in the 1940s. Motion picture minstrel shows boomed in the sound era beginning in the late 1920s (although Edison had produced one using a rudimentary sound process in 1913). Television began presenting minstrel shows in its experimental era (1940), and when TV ownership began to spread in the late 1940s ABC-TV had the American Minstrels of 1949 and Fred Waring produced no fewer than three minstrel show broadcasts on CBS-TV, in 1950, 1951 and 1953, with the Pennsylvanians in blackface and Waring as the white interlocutor. Ed Sullivan produced a full-scale minstrel show on CBS-TV in 1953.

The minstrel show played a powerful role in shaping assumptions about black people. However, unlike vehemently anti-black propaganda from the time, minstrelsy made this attitude palatable to a wide audience by couching it in the guise of well-intentioned paternalism.

1930 NBC promotional pamphlet using minstrel show references. Collection of E.O. Costello

Popular entertainment perpetuated the racist stereotype of the uneducated, ever-cheerful, and highly musical black person well into the 1950s. Even as the stage minstrel show was dying out in all but amateur theater, blackface performers became common acts on vaudeville stages and in legitimate drama. These entertainers kept the familiar songs, dances, and pseudo-black dialect, often in nostalgic looks back at the old minstrel show. The most famous of these performers is probably Al Jolson, who took blackface to the big screen in the 1920s in films such as The Jazz Singer (1927). His 1930 film Mammy uses the setting of a traveling minstrel show, giving an on-screen presentation of a performance. Likewise, when the sound era of cartoons began in the late 1920s, early animators such as Walt Disney gave characters such as Mickey Mouse (who already resembled blackface performers) a minstrel-show personality; the early Mickey is constantly singing and dancing and smiling. The face of Raggedy Ann is a color-reversed minstrel mask, and Raggedy Ann's creator, Johnny Gruelle, designed the doll in part with the antics of blackface star Fred Stone in mind. As late as 1942, as demonstrated in the Warner Bros. cartoon Fresh Hare, minstrel shows could be used as a gag (in this case, Elmer Fudd and Bugs Bunny leading a chorus of "Camptown Races") with the expectation, presumably, that audiences would get the reference. Radio broadcasting got into the act, a fact perhaps best exemplified by the popular radio minstrel shows Two Black Crows, Sam 'n' Henry, and Amos 'n' Andy, A transcription survives from 1931 of The Blue Coal Minstrels, which uses many of the standard forms of the minstrel show, including Tambo, Bones and the interlocutor. The National Broadcasting Company, in a 1930 pamphlet, used the minstrel show as a point of reference in selling its services.

As recently as the mid-1970s the BBC broadcast The Black and White Minstrel Show starring the George Mitchell Minstrels. The racist archetypes that blackface minstrelsy helped to create persist to this day; some argue that this is even true in hip hop culture and movies. The 2000 Spike Lee movie Bamboozled alleges that modern black entertainment exploits African-American culture much as the minstrel shows did a century ago, for example.

Meanwhile, African-American actors were limited to the same old minstrel-defined roles for years to come and by playing them, made them more believable to white audiences. On the other hand, these parts opened the entertainment industry to African-American performers and gave them their first opportunity to alter those stereotypes. Many famous singers and actors gained their start in black minstrelsy, including W. C. Handy, Ida Cox, Ma Rainey, Bessie Smith, Ethel Waters, and Butterbeans and Susie. The Rabbit's Foot Company was a variety troupe, founded in 1900 by an African American, Pat Chappelle, which drew on and developed the minstrel tradition while updating it and helping to develop and spread black musical styles. Besides Ma Rainey and Bessie Smith, later musicians working for "the Foots" included Louis Jordan, Brownie McGhee and Rufus Thomas, and the company was still touring as late as 1950. Its success was rivalled by other touring variety troupes, such as Silas Green from New Orleans.

The very structure of American entertainment bears minstrelsy's imprint. The endless barrage of gags and puns appears in the work of the Marx Brothers and David and Jerry Zucker. The varied structure of songs, gags, "hokum" and dramatic pieces continued into vaudeville, variety shows, and to modern sketch comedy shows such as Hee Haw or, more distantly, Saturday Night Live and In Living Color. Jokes once delivered by endmen are still told today: "Why did the chicken cross the road?" "Why does a fireman wear red suspenders?" Other jokes form part of the repertoire of modern comedians: "Who was that lady I saw you with last night? That was no lady—that was my wife!" The stump speech is an important precursor to modern comedy.

Another important legacy of minstrelsy is its music. The hokum blues genre carried over the dandy, the wench, the simple-minded slave characters (sometimes rendered as the rustic white "rube") and even the interlocutor into early blues and country music incarnations through the medium of "race music" and "hillbilly" recordings. Many minstrel tunes are now popular folk songs. Most have been expunged of the exaggerated black dialect and the overt references to blacks. "Dixie", for example, was adopted by the Confederacy as its unofficial national anthem and is still popular, and "Carry Me Back to Old Virginny" was sanitized and made the state song of Virginia until 1997. "My Old Kentucky Home" remains the state song of Kentucky. The instruments of the minstrel show were largely kept on, especially in the South. Minstrel performers from the last days of the shows, such as Uncle Dave Macon, helped popularize the banjo and fiddle in modern country music. And by introducing America to black dance and musical style, minstrels opened the nation to black cultural forms for the first time on a large scale.

== Motion pictures with minstrel show routines ==
A small number of films available today contain authentic recreations of Minstrel show numbers and routines. Due to their content they are rarely (if ever) broadcast on television today, but are available on home video.

- Uncle Tom's Cabin (1903), an early "full-length" movie (between 10 and 14 minutes), was directed by Edwin S. Porter and used white actors in blackface in the major roles. Similar to the earlier "Tom Shows" it featured black stereotypes such as having the slaves dance in almost any context, including at a slave auction.
- Edison Minstrels (1913), an early Kinetophone sound film of a minstrel first part using Edison recording and film artists. The interlocutor is Arthur Housman.
- A Plantation Act (1926), a Vitaphone sound-on-disc short film starring Al Jolson. Long thought to have been lost, a copy of the film and sound disc were located and the restored version has been issued as a bonus feature on the DVD release of The Jazz Singer.
- The Jazz Singer (1927), the first feature-length motion picture with synchronized dialogue sequences. Based on a play by Samson Raphaelson, the story tells of Jakie Rabinowitz (Al Jolson), the son of a devout Jewish family, who runs away from home to become a jazz singer.
- Why Bring That Up? (1929), a feature film starring Minstrel show comics Charles Mack and George Moran, also known as Two Black Crows.
- Mammy (1930), another Al Jolson film, this relives Jolson's early years as a minstrel man. With songs by Irving Berlin, who is also credited with the original story titled Mr. Bones.
- King for a Day (1934), is a 21-minute short in which Bill Green, played by Bill "Bojangles" Robinson, after being denied a chance to audition wins a black minstrel show in a crap game. The endmen in the show in the film emulate traditional white blackface by a line of white greasepaint around their mouths.
- Show Boat (1936), film starring Irene Dunne, Allan Jones, Hattie McDaniel, Paul Robeson. One of the shows on board is a blackface minstrel act.
- Swing Time (1936), a musical starring Fred Astaire and Ginger Rogers features a dance number entitled "Bojangles of Harlem" performed by Astaire in blackface.
- Honolulu (1939), in which Eleanor Powell performs a blackface dance homage to Bill "Bojangles" Robinson.
- Swanee River (1940), another fictionalized biographical film on Stephen Foster. It was nominated for the Academy Award for Best Musical Scoring and was the last on-screen appearance of Al Jolson.
- Babes on Broadway (1941), a musical starring Mickey Rooney and Judy Garland. The next-to-last musical number is a medley of songs performed in blackface.
- Fresh Hare (1942), an animated short featuring Bugs Bunny and Elmer Fudd. The final scene, edited out of recent television broadcasts, shows Bunny and Fudd in blackface, along with five tall men in the same condition, singing "Camptown Races".
- Holiday Inn (1942), contains a musical number entitled "Abraham" with Bing Crosby performing in blackface in the style of a minstrel show. Beginning in the 1980s, this number has been cut from many TV broadcasts.
- Dixie (1943), a film based on the life of songwriter Daniel Decatur Emmett. It includes Bing Crosby singing the film's title song in blackface.
- The Adventures of Mark Twain (1944), blackface musicians perform a jolly number on the river vessel, in the scene where Captain Clemens rescues Charles Langdon from a thief.
- Here Come the Waves (1944), contains a show-within-a-show. It includes a minstrel routine performed by Bing Crosby and Sonny Tufts; their two characters then sing a musical number entitled "Ac-Cen-Tchu-Ate the Positive".
- Minstrel Man (1944), a fictional film about the rise, fall, and revival of a minstrel performer's career. It was nominated for two Academy Awards (Best Original Song and Best Original Score).
- My Wild Irish Rose (1947), starring Dennis Morgan, Andrea King, and Arlene Dahl, is set in 1890s New York and features several scenes depicting blackface musical numbers.
- Hollywood Varieties (1950), a collection of stage acts with Glen Vernon and Edward Ryan in a blackface skit.
- Yes Sir, Mr. Bones (1951), is based around a young child who finds a rest home for retired minstrel performers. In "flashback" sequences, a number of actual minstrel veterans, including Scatman Crothers, Freeman Davis (aka "Brother Bones"), Ned Haverly, Phil Arnold, "endmen" Cotton Watts and Slim Williams, the dancing team of Boyce and Evans, and the comic duo Ches Davis and Emmett Miller, perform in the roles they popularized in Minstrel shows.
- I Dream of Jeanie (1952) aka I Dream of Jeanie (with the Light Brown Hair), a completely fictional film biography of Stephen Foster. Veteran performer Glen Turnbull makes a guest appearance as a blackface Minstrel performer in Christy's Minstrels.
- Torch Song (1953), starring Joan Crawford, Michael Wilding, and Marjorie Rambeau, contains a musical number, done in blackface, entitled "Two-faced Woman."
- White Christmas (1954), features a full-scale minstrel show number, but without blackface. The lyrics to the songs do not insinuate that minstrel shows involved blackface, but invoked much of the same linguistic mechanisms as minstrel shows, such as double entendre. The lyrics to the song also include the line "I'd pawn my overcoat and vest / To see a minstrel show".
- Bamboozled (2000), a satirical film using minstrelsy to lampoon American popular culture written and directed by Spike Lee.
- Masked and Anonymous (2003), set in a dystopian future. Ed Harris plays a blackfaced character in one scene.

== See also ==
- The Black and White Minstrel Show
- Eldred Kurtz Means
- List of blackface minstrel songs
- List of blackface minstrel troupes
- List of entertainers who performed in blackface
- Stage Irish

== Cited and general references ==
- Alexander, Michelle (2012). The New Jim Crow. New Press. ISBN 978-1-59558-819-7.
- Bernstein, Robin (2011). Racial Innocence: Performing American Childhood from Slavery to Civil Rights. New York: New York University Press. ISBN 978-0-8147-8709-0.
- Bauch, Marc A. (2012), "Gentlemen, Be Seated!" - The Rise and the Fall of the Minstrel Show, Munich, Germany: Grin Verlag, ISBN 978-3-656-08636-9
- Brooks, Tim (2020), The Blackface Minstrel Show in Mass Media: 20^{th} Century Performances on Radio, Records, Film and Television, Jefferson NC: McFarland & Co, ISBN 978-1-4766-7676-0.
- Cantwell, Robert (1984), Bluegrass Breakdown: The Making of the Old Southern Sound, Chicago: University of Illinois Press, ISBN 978-0-306-80495-3. Reprinted 2003.
- Cockrell, Dale (1997), Demons of Disorder: Early Blackface Minstrels and their World, Cambridge University Press / Cambridge Studies in American Theatre and Drama, ISBN 978-0-521-56828-9
- Jackson, Ronald L. II (2006), Scripting the Black Masculine Body: Identity, Discourse, and Racial Politics in Popular Media, Albany: State University of New York Press, ISBN 978-0-306-80495-3. Reprinted 2003.
- Lenz, Beth (1989), The Bones in the United States: History and Performance Practice. M. A. Thesis, University of Michigan.
- Lott, Eric (1993), Love and Theft: Blackface Minstrelsy and the American Working Class, New York: Oxford University Press, ISBN 978-0-19-509641-5
- Malone, Bill C.; Stricklin, David (2003), Southern Music/American Music (Revised ed.), Lexington: University Press of Kentucky
- Marc, David (1997). Comic Visions: Television Comedy & American Culture (2nd ed.). Malden, Massachusetts: Blackwell Publishers Inc.
- Nathan, Hans (1962), Dan Emmett and the Rise of Early Negro Minstrelsy, Norman: University of Oklahoma Press
- Oliver, Paul (1972), The Story of the Blues, Penguin, ISBN 978-0-14-003509-4
- Paskman, Dailey; Spaeth, Sigmund (1928), A Working Model, Garden City: Doubleday, Doran & Company, archived from the original on September 10, 2006
- Sacks, Howard L.; Sacks, Judith (1993), Way up North in Dixie: A Black Family's Claim to the Confederate Anthem, Washington: Smithsonian Institution Press
- Smith, Peter Dunbaugh (2006), Ashley Street Blues: Racial Uplift and the Commodification of Vernacular Performance in Lavilla, Florida, 1896–1916 (PDF), Florida State University, archived from the original (PDF) on March 26, 2009
- Sotiropoulos, Karen (2006), Staging Race: Black Performers in Turn of the Century America, Cambridge: Harvard University Press
- Stark, Seymour (2000), Men in Blackface: True Stories of the Minstrel Show, Xlibris
- Strausbaugh, John (2006), Black Like You, Tarcher, ISBN 1-58542-498-6
- Sullivan, Megan (2001), "African-American music as rebellion: From slavesong to hip-hop", Discoveries, 3: 21–39
- Toll, Robert C. (1974), Blacking Up: The Minstrel Show in Nineteenth-century America, New York: Oxford University Press
- Toll, Robert C. (April–May 1978), "Behind the Blackface: Minstrel Men and Minstrel Myths", American Heritage, 29 (3), archived from the original on January 9, 2009
- Watkins, Mel (1994), On the Real Side: Laughing, Lying, and Signifying—The Underground Tradition of African-American Humor that Transformed American Culture, from Slavery to Richard Pryor, New York: Simon & Schuster
- Watkins, Mel (1999), On the Real Side: A History of African American Comedy from Slavery to Chris Rock, Chicago, Illinois: Lawrence Hill Books, ISBN 978-1-55652-351-9
- Wald, Elijah (2004), Escaping the Delta: Robert Johnson and the Invention of the Blues, New York: Amistad, ISBN 978-0-06-052423-4
- Zapata-Rodríguez, Melisa M. (2016). "Minstresy: Iconography of Resistance During the American Civil War". Music in Art: International Journal for Music Iconography. 41 (1–2): 111–127. ISSN 1522-7464.
