= John "Picayune" Butler =

American singer

- Also known as: Picayune Butler
- Born: John Butler; French West Indies
- Died: 18 November 1864 New York City
- Occupations: Stage actor, singer, instrumentalist
- Instruments: banjo, bones

John "Picayune" Butler (died 1864) was a black French singer and banjo player who lived in New Orleans, Louisiana. He came to New Orleans from the French West Indies in the 1820s. One of his influences was Old Corn Meal, a street vendor who had gained fame as a singer and dancer at the St. Charles Theatre in 1837. By the 1820s, Butler had begun touring the Mississippi Valley performing music and clown acts. His fame grew so that by the 1850s he was known as far north as Cincinnati. In 1857, Butler participated in the first banjo tournament in the United States held at New York City's Chinese Hall, but due to inebriation, he only placed second.

Butler is one of the first documented black entertainers to have influenced American popular music, through the blackface song "Picayune Butler's Come to Town", published in 1858, and named for him. His performance with the song influenced one blackface entertainer directly; circus performer George Nichols took his song "Picayune Butler Is Going Away" from him and claimed to have learned "Jump Jim Crow" from Butler (saying he was performing the song years before Rice). In the New York Clipper, an article claimed that Nichols saw John Picayune Butler imitating the character in the song, and got the idea to do the same thing when he sang Jim Crow; at first he had sung it as a clown, but after seeing Butler, he began to sing it in blackface. The man "Corn Meal" also influenced Nichols, just as he had Butler.

In the early 1850s, Butler was one of three people who formed a rivalry, the best professional banjo performers of the day, according to Frank B. Converse. The other two were white blackface minstrel players, Tom Briggs (author of the Briggs Banjo Instructor, 1855) and Hiram Rumsey. Converse was himself a banjo performer and author of several banjo instruction books. In the early 1850s when he was about 14 years old, Converse saw Butler perform. He paid attention and later used his observations of Butler in formulating a standard system to teach the stroke or clawhammer style of playing. Converse noted that Butler used a banjo thimble (metal covers that go over the fingernails, to use with the clawhammer/stroke style).

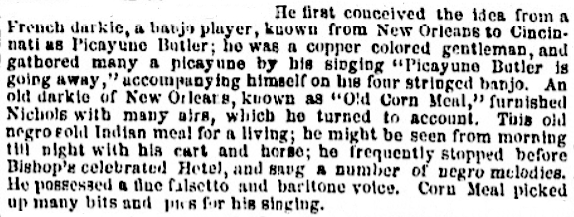
Part of a news clipping discussing how George Nichols looked at John Picayune Butler and "Corn Meal" as inspiration to begin singing "Jim Crow" in blackface. 24 November 1860 in the New York Clipper.

John Picayune Butler death, 18 November 1864, announced 10 December 1864 in New York Clipper.

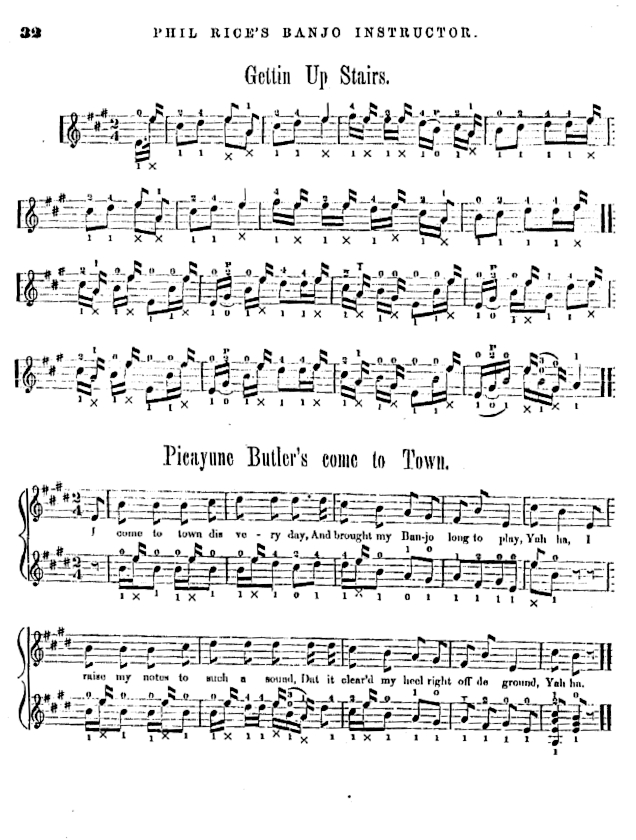
Picayune Butler's Coming to Town, first page from Phil Rice's book, Phil Rice's Correct Method for the Banjo With or Without a Master.

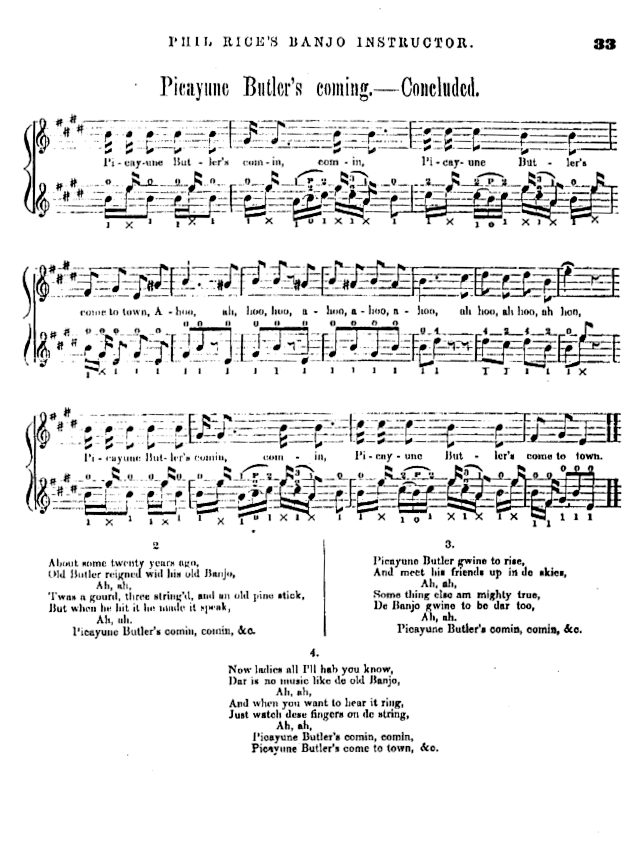
Picayune Butler's Coming to Town, second page from Phil Rice's book, Phil Rice's Correct Method for the Banjo With or Without a Master.

== Multiple people use name ==
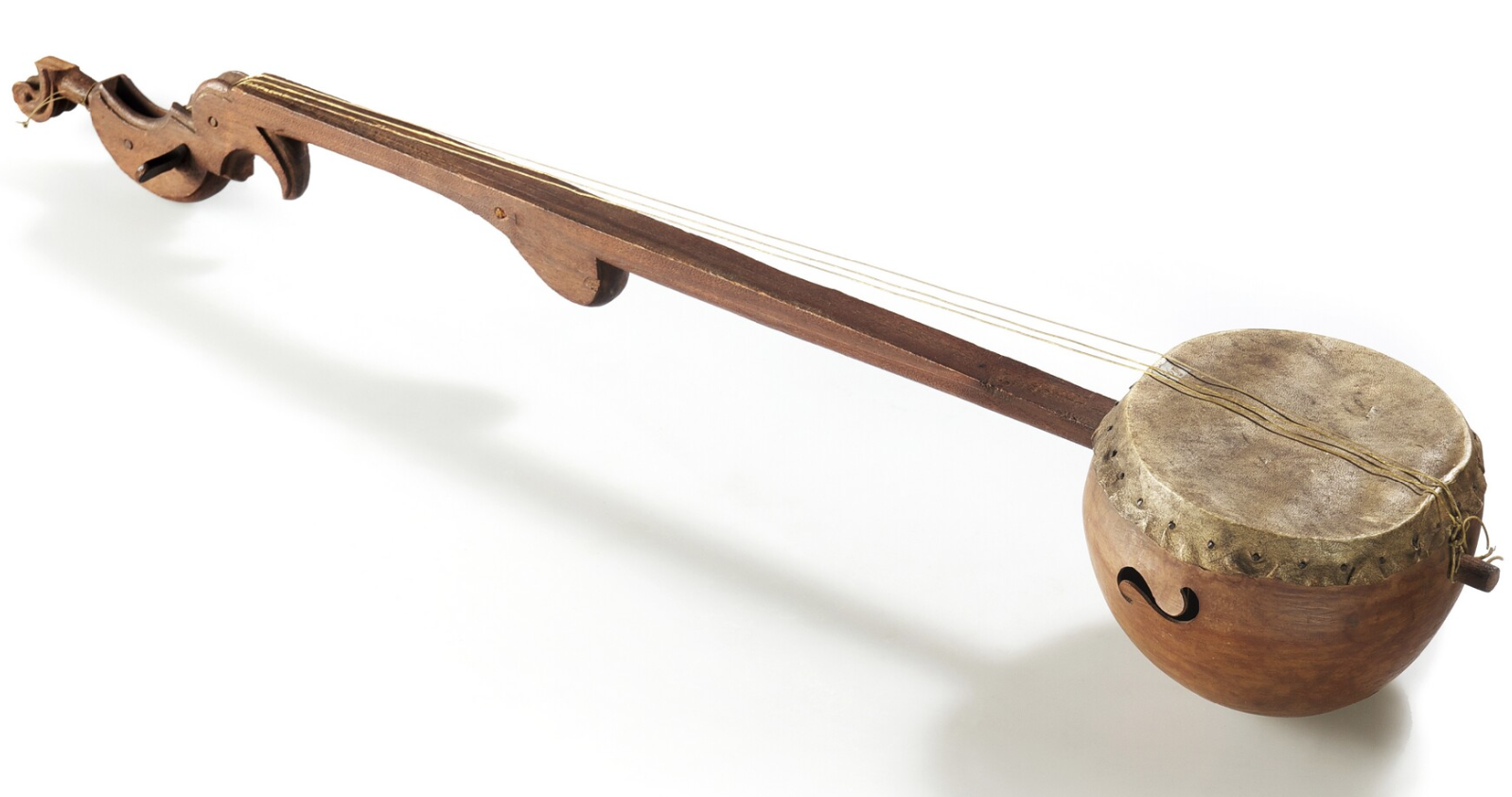
The oldest known banjo, c. 1770–1777, from the Surinamese Creole culture. Gourd body, carved stick or plank for a neck, three strings.

Music historian Lowell H. Schreyer has brought up the possibility that more than one person may be incorporated in the name Picayune Butler, some possibly inspired by popularity of the minstrel song Picayune Butler's Come to Town. One was the original person, the subject of the 1845 song who would have been playing in about 1825. This player is interesting, in that he is described as using a 3-string gourd banjo, which is a banjo type found among descendants of African people in the Caribbean Islands and parts of North America, from the 1600s into the 1800s.

"Picayune Butler's Come To Town
About some twenty years ago,
Old Butler reigned wid his ol Banjo...
Twas a gourd, three stringed, and an ol pine stick
But when he hit it, he made it speak"[12]

The name was also listed in November 1845 for a possible second performer with the "Eagle Circus," touring in Louisville, Kentucky, Indiana and Cincinnati, Ohio. A possible third performer is the main subject of this article, from New Orleans, listed in the New York Clipper on 24 November 1860 and 18 November 1864; he was "copper colored" and played a four-string banjo. Additionally, the name is reported to have been the stage name for a fourth performer, William Coleman (1829-1867).
