= Jim Crow (character) =

Blackface minstrel character

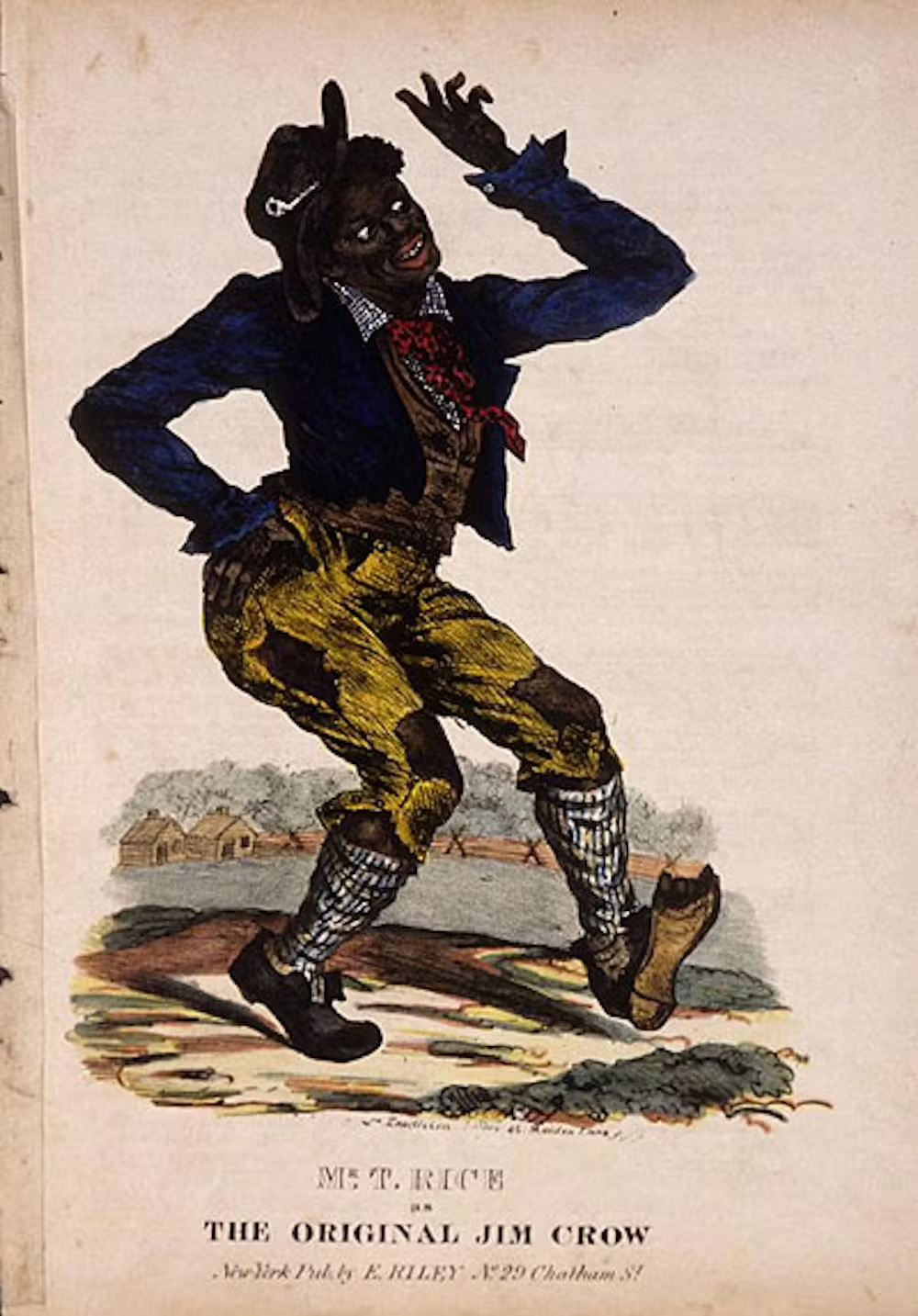
c. 1832 illustration of Thomas D. Rice portraying the persona

The Jim Crow persona is a theater character developed by American entertainer Thomas D. Rice and popularized through his minstrel shows. The character is a stereotypical depiction of African Americans and of their culture. Rice based the character on a folk trickster named Jim Crow that had long been popular among enslaved black people. Rice also adapted and popularized a traditional slave song called "Jump Jim Crow" (1828).

The character dresses in rags and wears a battered hat and torn pants. Rice applied blackface makeup made of burnt cork to his face and hands and impersonated a witty African-American field-hand who sang, "Come listen all you galls and boys, I'm going to sing a little song, my name is Jim Crow, weel about and turn about and do jis so, eb'ry time I weel about I jump Jim Crow."

== Origin ==
The actual origin of the Jim Crow character has been lost to legend. One story claims it is Rice's emulation of a black slave that he had seen on his travels throughout the Southern United States, whose owner was one Mr. Crow. Several sources describe Rice encountering an elderly black stableman working in one of the river towns where Rice was performing. According to some accounts, the man had a crooked leg and a deformed shoulder. He was singing about Jim Crow and punctuating each stanza with a little jump. According to Edmon S. Conner, an actor who worked with Rice early in his career, the alleged encounter happened in Louisville, Kentucky. Conner and Rice were both engaged for a summer season at the city theater, which at the back overlooked a livery stable. A disabled, elderly slave working in the stable yard often performed a song and dance he had improvised for his own amusement. The actors saw him, and Rice "watched him closely, and saw that there was a character unknown to the stage. He wrote several verses, changed the air somewhat, quickened it a good deal, made up exactly like Daddy, and sang it to a Louisville audience. They were wild with delight..." According to Conner, the livery stable was owned by a white man named Crow, whose name the elderly slave adopted.

An alternative explanation behind the origin of the character is that Rice had observed and absorbed African-American traditional song and dance over many years. He grew up in a racially integrated Manhattan neighborhood, and later Rice toured the Southern slave states. According to the reminiscences of Isaac Odell, a former minstrel who described the development of the genre in an interview given in 1907, Rice appeared on stage at Louisville, Kentucky, in the 1830s and learned there to mimic local black speech: "Coming to New York he opened up at the old Park Theatre, where he introduced his Jim Crow act, impersonating a black slave. He sang a song, 'I Turn About and Wheel About', and each night composed new verses for it, catching on with the public and making a great name for himself."

== Jim Crow laws ==
Rice's famous stage persona eventually lent its name to a generalized negative and stereotypical view of black people. The shows peaked in the 1850s, and after Rice's death in 1860 interest in them faded. There was still some memory of them in the 1870s however, just as the "Jim Crow" segregation laws were surfacing in the United States. The Jim Crow period was later revived by President Woodrow Wilson: after a showing of the motion picture The Birth of a Nation (1915), which glorified the Ku Klux Klan and portrayed black people as bestial rapists, he signed segregation laws and targeted black people in government. Ida B. Wells, a well known black Republican journalist and a co-founder of the NAACP, bitterly fought against this policy. Jim Crow segregation only ended in the 1960s, when the civil rights movement gained national support for the Civil Rights Act.

== Legacy ==
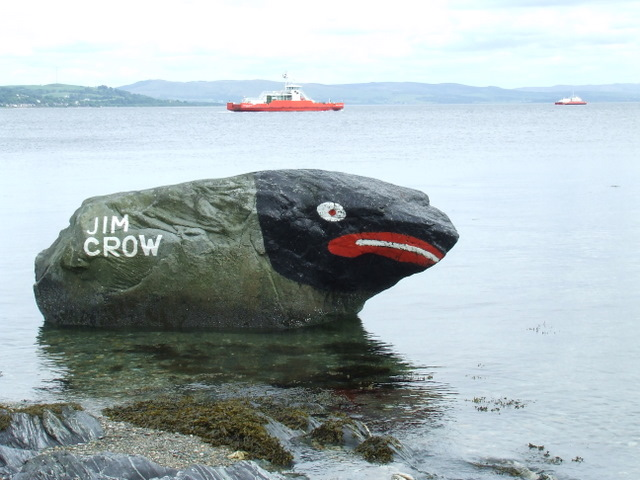
Jim Crow rock on Firth of Clyde shore near Hunters Quay, eventually repainted as the Puffin Rock

The poem "The Jackdaw of Rheims" by English writer Richard Barham, published in 1837 (and in The Ingoldsby Legends of 1840), concludes "It's the custom, at Rome, new names to bestow, So they canonized him by the name of Jim Crow!".

By 1838, and through to the end of the 19th century, the term "Jim Crow" was used as an abusive term towards black people, well before it became associated with Jim Crow laws.

The "Jim Crow" character as portrayed by Rice popularized the perception of African-Americans as lazy, untrustworthy, unintelligent, and unworthy of social participation. Rice's performances helped to popularize American minstrelsy, in which performers imitated Rice's blackface and stereotypical mannerisms, touring around the United States. Those performers spread the racist depiction of the character across the United States, contributing to white Americans' negative view of African-American character and work ethic.

In Nathaniel Hawthorne's The House of the Seven Gables (1851), a young schoolboy buys gingerbread "Jim Crow" cookies for a penny each.

In The Twinkle Tales children's fantasy novellas by L. Frank Baum, the primary antagonist of one story is a literal crow named Jim Crow. He is portrayed as an unrepentant criminal with all the negative qualities of stereotypical black characters.

A character in the 1941 Walt Disney animated feature film Dumbo, a literal crow, was originally named "Jim Crow" on the original model sheets, although his name is never mentioned in the film. The character was renamed in the 1950s to "Dandy Crow" in attempt to avoid controversy. Floyd Norman, the first African-American animator hired at Walt Disney Productions during the 1950s, defended the character in an article entitled Black Crows and Other PC Nonsense, saying that the original name 'Jim Crow' was "taking a cartoony jab at the oppressive Jim Crow laws in the South".

Garry Trudeau's comic strip Doonesbury has a recurring character named Jimmy Crow. He appears in the form of a literal crow but is an allegorical personification of racial hatred and injustice.

In the music video for Childish Gambino's "This Is America", Gambino shoots a man in the head while posing like a Jim Crow caricature.

In Target's 2026 Halloween collection, a costume was released that had similarities to the character. It was removed from their shops and website after much criticism online.

== See also ==
- Eldred Kurtz Means
