= Francis Leon =

American minstrel performer (1844–1922)

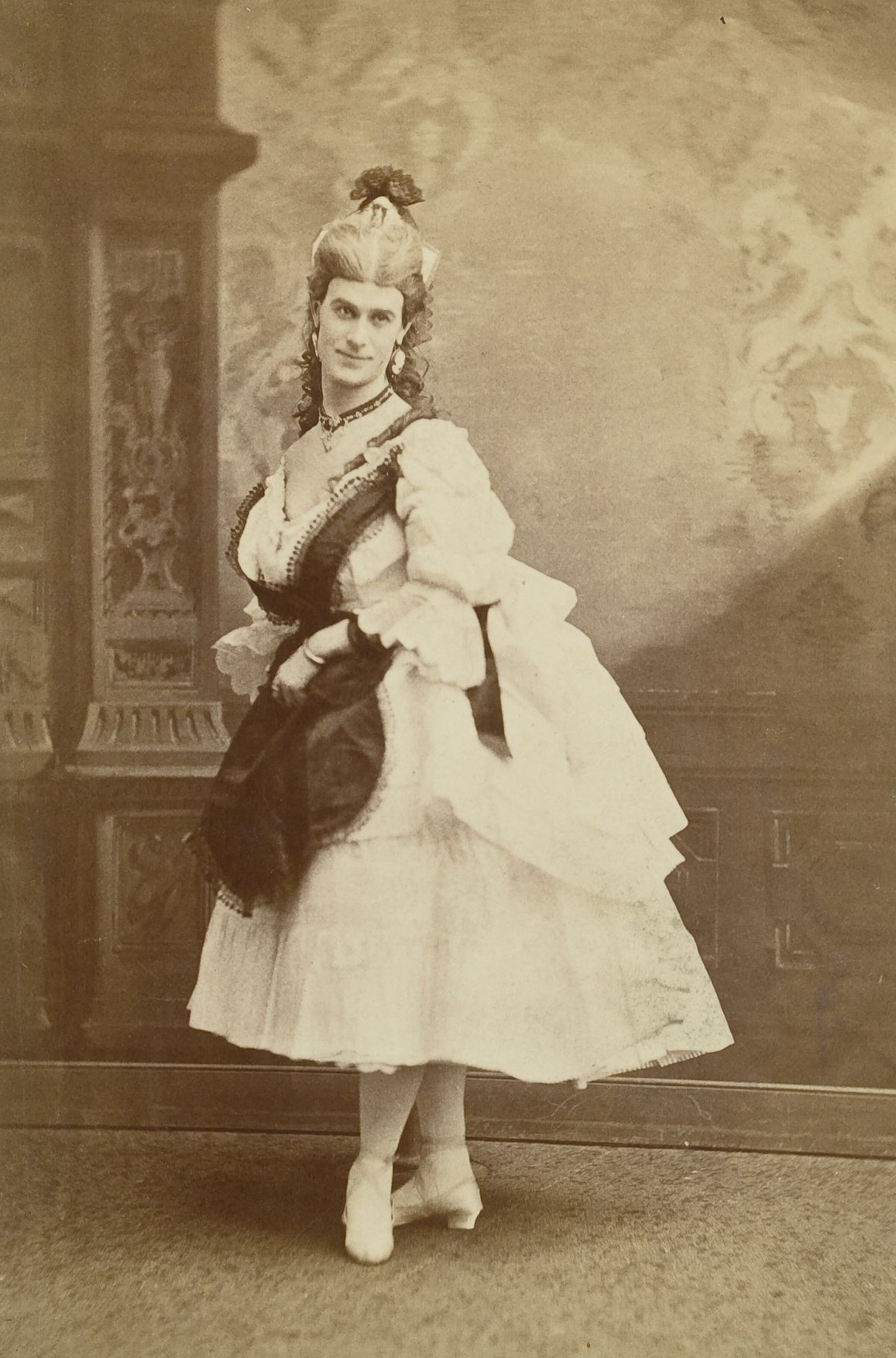
Francis Leon in his female persona

Francis Leon (born Francis Patrick Glassey; November 21, 1844 – August 19, 1922) was an American vaudevillian actor best known as a blackface minstrel performer and female impersonator. He was largely responsible for making the prima donna a fixture of blackface minstrelsy.

== Biography ==
Leon was born in California. He was trained as a boy soprano by Rev. Dr. Cummings in Fordham, New York. He performed the first soprano part in Mozart's Twelfth Mass at St. Stephen's church in New York City at age 8. Leon entered minstrelsy in 1858. Only 14 at the time, he quickly rose to fame by specializing in portraying female prima donna characters, mulatto coquettes in “high yellow” makeup and elaborate costumes. Leon's 300 dresses (which he refused to call "costumes") were a key piece of his act, and some cost as much as $400. He came to refer to himself as simply "Leon" or "The Only Leon". His influence was such that by 1873, every major minstrel troupe had its own Leon imitator. In 1882, he earned more than any other minstrel performer.

Leon received strong reviews. In 1870, The Clipper raved, "Leon is the best male female actor known to the stage. He does it with such dignity, modesty, and refinement that it is truly art." In fact, Leon's impersonation was so convincing that a reviewer in Rochester, New York remarked, "Heaps of boys in my locality don't believe yet it's a man in spite of my saying it was", and that Leon could "make a fool of a man if he wasn't sure." Another critic raved, "He is more womanly in his by-play and mannerisms than the most charming female imaginable." The idea that a male performer represented women better than women was echoed by another critic who noted, "Just as a white man makes the best stage Negro, so a man gives more photographic interpretation of femininity than the average woman is able to give".

In 1864, Leon formed a minstrel troupe with Edwin Kelly. Leon and Kelly's Minstrels spoke of their freedom from vulgarity and featured elaborate scenery and refined operas with Leon as the female lead. Though these were at heart burlesques, Leon insisted that everything was quite proper. He claimed to have studied ballet from a respected dancer and to have practiced for "hours every day" for seven years. He further asserted that he took voice lessons from famous opera teacher Errani. Ultimately, however, Leon's performances were not enough to keep the company afloat. By 1883, Leon had joined the San Francisco Minstrels. In January 1891, he was performing the character Carmencita at Niblo's theatre in New York. His last known appearance was in Chicago in November 1900, when he was attempting a comeback. One critic felt his days as a female impersonator were definitely over. An old friend, Malcolm Douglas, reminisced about him in a 1942 news article. He said that in later years Leon owned a large office building in Chicago and that he lived to an "old age." Leon died in Chicago on August 19, 1922 and was interred at Mount Carmel Cemetery.

== Gallery ==
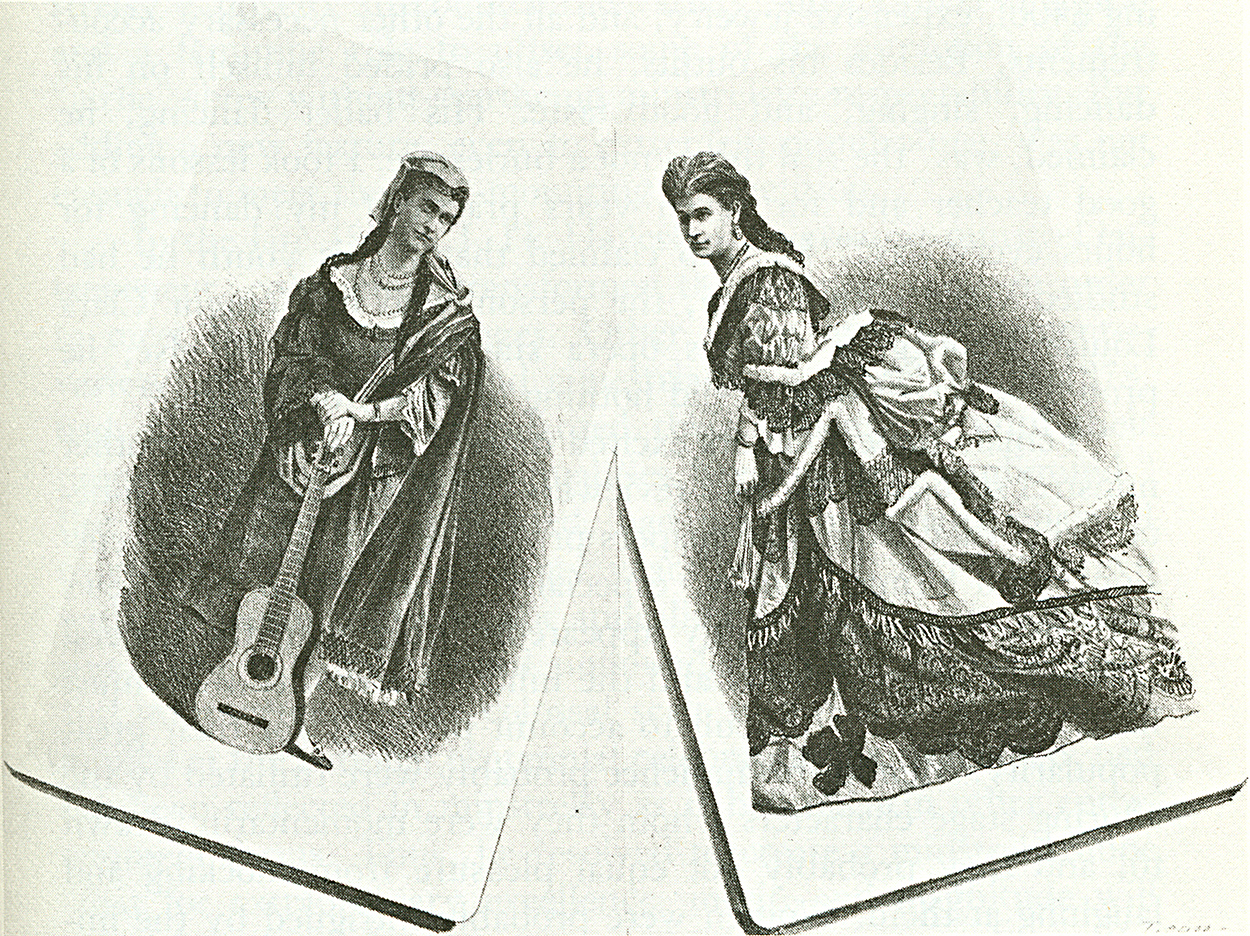

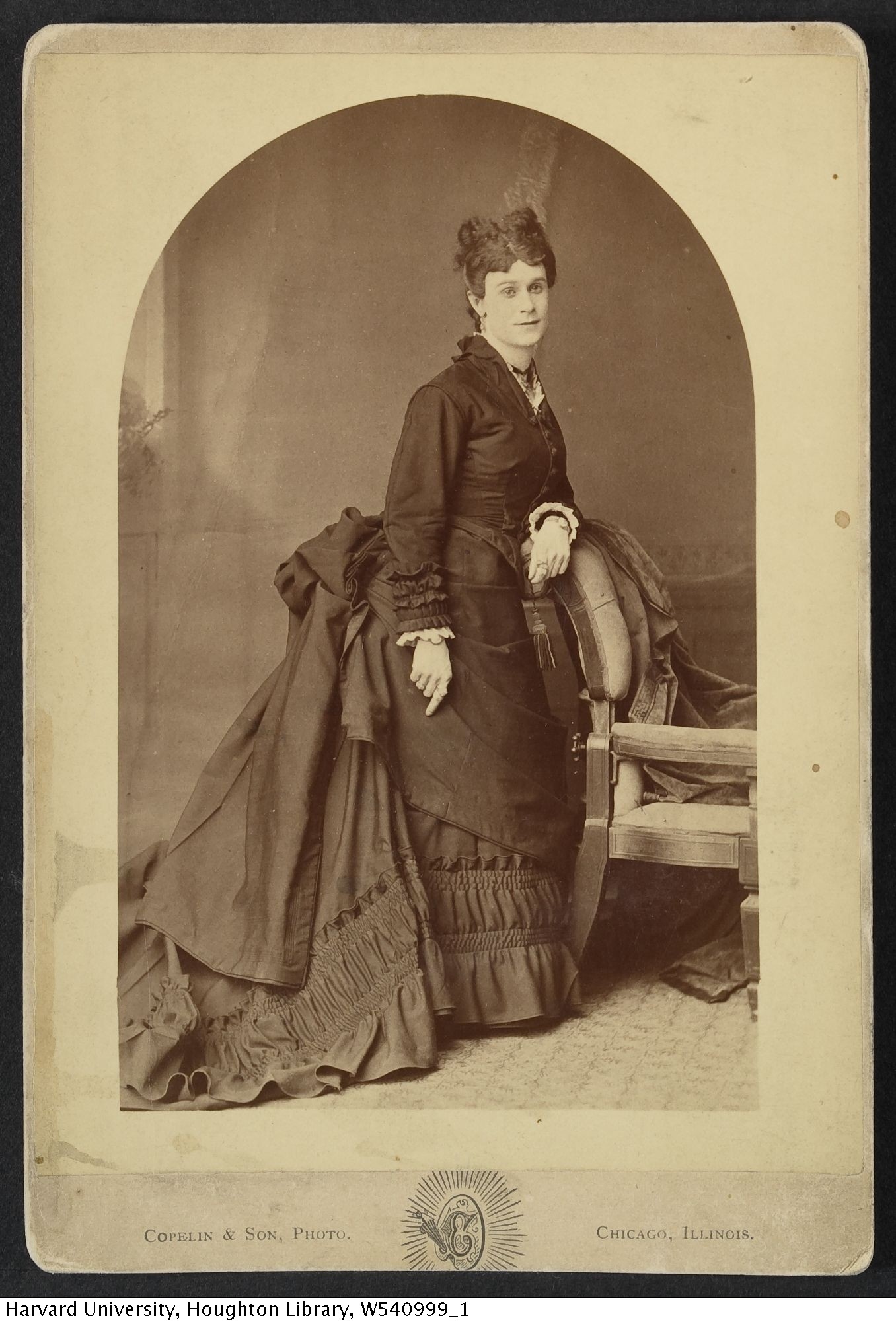

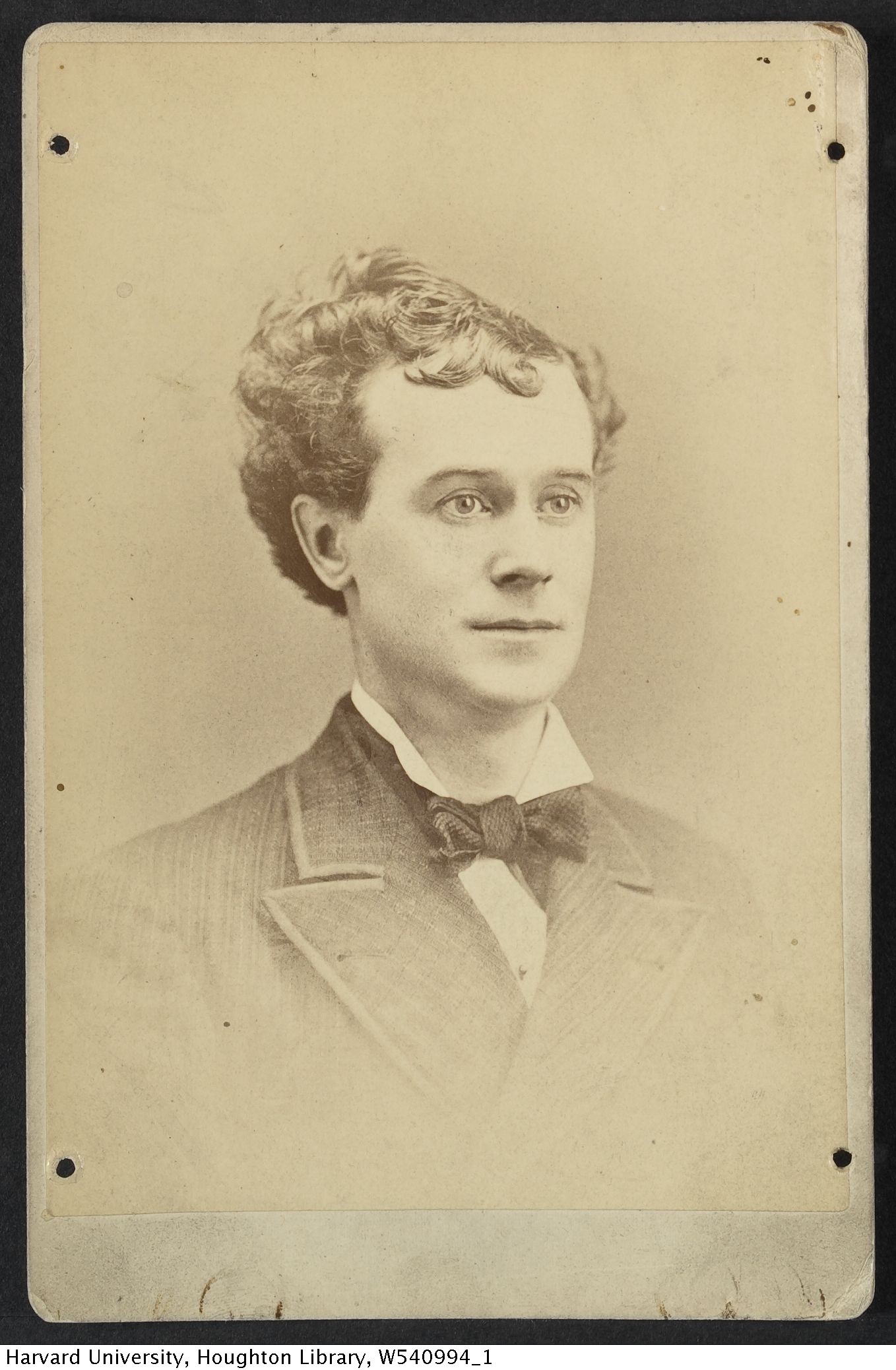
