= Sich a Getting up Stairs =

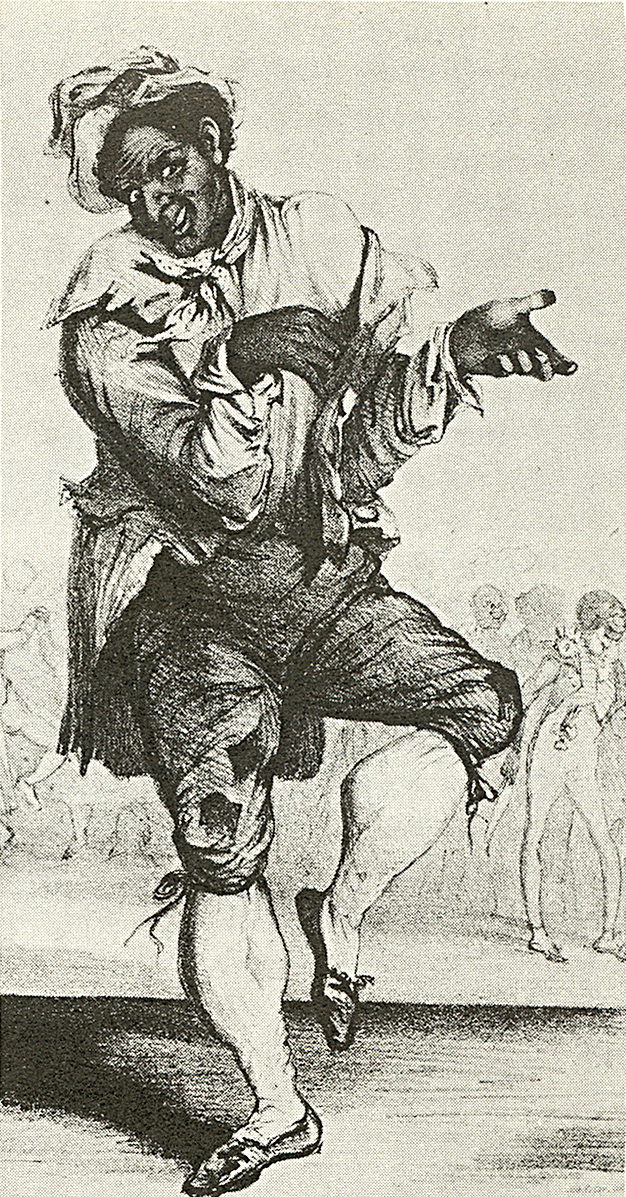
Detail from sheet music cover of "Sich a Getting Up Stairs", featuring Thomas D. Rice.

"Sich a Getting Up Stairs" (and various variant spellings) is an American song that dates to the early 1830s. It was in the repertoire of Thomas D. Rice and other early blackface performers.

Musicologist Hans Nathan calls "Sich a Getting Up Stairs" a descendant of the song "Getting Upstairs", a Border Morris song from England and Wales. Musicologist Dale Cockrell, on the other hand, doubts this, as the copy of "Getting Upstairs" on which Nathan based his comparison dates to after the creation of the American blackface song. "Sich a Getting Up Stairs" was fairly popular in the United States and could thus have influenced later versions of the Morris song.
