= Shingle dancing =

Shingle dancing is a form of solo dancing akin to tap dancing, of African American origin, usually associated with old-time music. A shingle dancer dances on a small wooden platform (typically no more than about 30 inches square), sometimes equipped with a bell or a loose piece of metal to allow additional percussive effects.

In the early 19th century in New York City, African American slaves would shingle dance for spare change on their days off.
