= Jump Jim Crow =

American song about Jim Crow

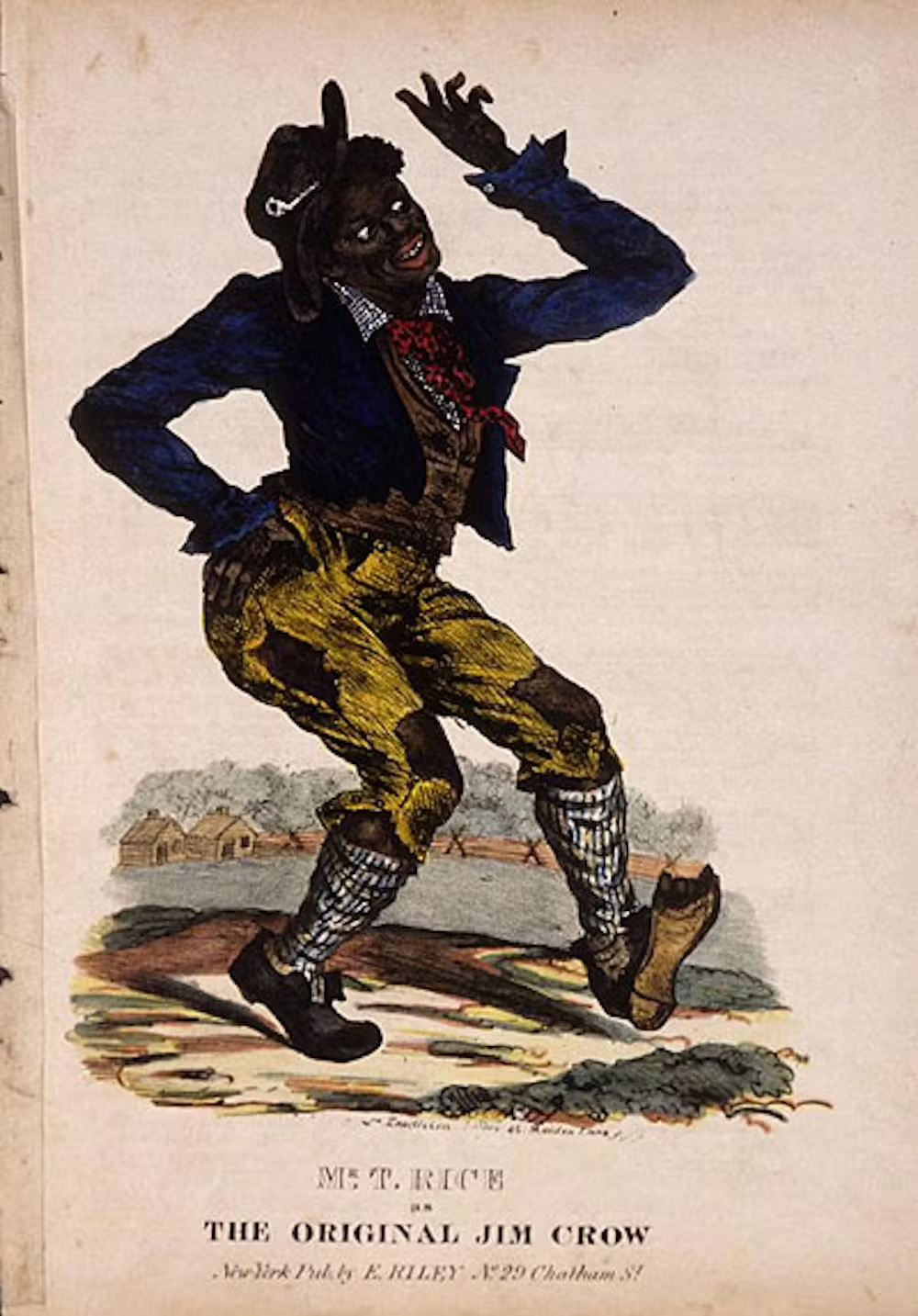
- Cover to an early edition sheet music by Thomas D. Rice, pictured here performing in black face at the Bowery Theatre, Manhattan, illustration by Edward Williams Clay, c. 1832

Song
- Written: 1828
- Published: 1832
- Genre: Minstrel song, folk song, song and dance song
- Songwriter: Thomas D. Rice

"Jump Jim Crow", often shortened to just "Jim Crow", is a song and dance from 1828 that was done in blackface by white minstrel performer Thomas D. Rice. The song is speculated to have been taken from Jim Crow (sometimes called Jim Cuff or Uncle Joe), a physically disabled enslaved African-American, who is variously claimed to have lived in St. Louis, Cincinnati, and Pittsburgh. The song became a 19th-century hit and Rice performed it all over the United States as "Daddy Pops Jim Crow".

"Jump Jim Crow" was a key initial step in a tradition of popular music in the United States that was based on the racist "imitation" of black people. The first song sheet edition appeared in the early 1830s, published by E. Riley. A couple of decades saw the mockery genre explode in popularity with the rise of the minstrel show.

As originally printed, the song contained "floating verses", which appear in altered forms in other popular folk songs. The chorus of the song is closely related to the traditional Uncle Joe / Hop High Ladies; some folklorists consider "Jim Crow" and "Uncle Joe" to be a single, continuous family of songs.

As a result of Rice's fame, the term Jim Crow had become a pejorative term for African Americans by 1838, and from this time onward, the laws of racial segregation became known as Jim Crow laws.

== Lyrics ==
As they are most commonly quoted, the lyrics of the song are as follows:

Come, listen all you gals and boys, Ise just from Tuckyhoe;
I'm goin' to sing a little song, My name's Jim Crow.

CHORUS [after every verse]
Weel about and turn about and do jis so,
Eb'ry time I weel about I jump Jim Crow.

I went down to the river, I didn't mean to stay;
But dere I see so many gals, I couldn't get away.

And arter I been dere awhile, I tought I push my boat;
But I tumbled in de river, and I find myself afloat.

I git upon a flat boat, I cotch de Uncle Sam;
Den I went to see de place where dey kill'd de Pakenham.

And den I go to Orleans, an, feel so full of flight;
Dey put me in de calaboose, an, keep me dere all night.

When I got out I hit a man, his name I now forgot;
But dere was noting left of him 'cept a little grease spot.

And oder day I hit a man, de man was mighty fat
I hit so hard I nockt him in to an old cockt hat.

I whipt my weight in wildcats, I eat an alligator;
I drunk de Mississippy up! O! I'm de very creature.

I sit upon a hornet's nest, I dance upon my head;
I tie a wiper round my neck an, den I go to bed.

I kneel to de buzzard, an, I bow to the crow;
An eb'ry time I weel about I jump jis so.

=== Standard English ===
Other verses, quoted in non-dialect standard English:

Come, listen, all you girls and boys, I'm just from Tuckahoe;
I'm going to sing a little song, My name's Jim Crow.

CHORUS:
Wheel about, and turn about, and do just so;
Every time I wheel about, I jump Jim Crow.

I went down to the river, I didn't mean to stay,
But there I saw so many girls, I couldn't get away.

I'm roaring on the fiddle, and down in old Virginia,
They say I play the scientific, like master Paganini,

I cut so many monkey shines, I dance the galoppade;
And when I'm done, I rest my head, on shovel, hoe or spade.

I met Miss Dina Scrub one day, I give her such a buss [kiss];
And then she turn and slap my face, and make a mighty fuss.

The other girls they begin to fight, I told them wait a bit;
I'd have them all, just one by one, as I thought fit.

I whip the lion of the west, I eat the alligator;
I put more water in my mouth, then boil ten load of potatoe.

The way they bake the hoe cake, Virginia never tire.
They put the dough upon the foot and stick them in the fire.

== Variants ==
As he extended it from a single song into an entire minstrel revue, Rice routinely wrote additional verses for "Jump Jim Crow". Published versions from the period run as long as 66 verses; one extant version of the song, as archived by American Memory, includes 150 verses. Verses range from the boastful doggerel of the original version to an endorsement of President Andrew Jackson (known as "Old Hickory"); his Whig opponent in the 1832 election was Henry Clay:

Old hick'ry never mind de boys
But hold up your head;
For people never turn to clay
'Till arter dey be dead.

Other verses by Rice, also written in 1832, demonstrate anti-slavery sentiments and cross-racial solidarity, sentiments that were rarely expressed in later blackface minstrelsy:

Should dey get to fighting,
Perhaps de blacks will rise,
For deir wish for freedom,
Is shining in deir eyes.

And if de blacks should get free,
I guess dey'll see some bigger,
An I shall consider it,
A bold stroke for de nigger.

I'm for freedom,
An for Union altogether,
Although I'm a black man,
De white is call'd my broder.

The song also condemns Virginia for being the birthplace of George Washington, and the landing place for slaves from Guinea in Africa.

But bress dat Baltimore,
Wid a monument of stun,
Erected to de memory,
Ob great massa Washington.
Dan dare is de state,
Where de niggers lan from guinny,
De birth place ob dat great man,
Tree cheers for ol Virginny.

== Origins ==
The origin of the name "Jim Crow" is obscure but may have evolved from the use of the pejorative "crow" to refer to black people in the 1730s. Jim may be derived from "Jimmy", an old cant term for a crow, which is based on a pun for the tool "crow" (crowbar). Before 1900, crowbars were called "crows" and a short crowbar was and still is called a "jimmy", a typical burglar's tool. The folk concept of a dancing crow predates the Jump Jim Crow minstrelsy and has its origins in the old farmer's practice of soaking corn in whiskey and leaving it out for the crows. The crows eat the corn and become so drunk that they cannot fly, but wheel and jump helplessly near the ground, where the farmer can kill them with a club.

== See also ==
- Uncle Tom
- Minstrel show
- The Twinkle Tales (1905) by L. Frank Baum, a children's fantasy novel featuring a character named Jim Crow who is literally a crow.
- Dumbo (1941), a film by Walt Disney Pictures which also features a literal crow named Jim Crow.

== Sources ==
- Strausbaugh, John (June 8, 2006). Black Like You: Blackface, Whiteface, Insult and Imitation in American Popular Culture. Jeremy P. Tarcher / Penguin. ISBN 978-1-58542-498-6.
