= Errani =

Errani is a surname. Notable people with the surname include:

- Achille Errani (1823–1897), Italian opera singer
- Piero Errani (1936–2024), Italian sports shooter
- Sara Errani (born 1987), Italian tennis player
- Vasco Errani (born 1955), Italian politician
