= Old Corn Meal =

American singer

Old Corn Meal, or Signor Cormeali (died 1842), was an African-American who became famous as a street vendor in New Orleans, Louisiana in the late 1830s for singing and dancing while he sold his wares. He is one of the earliest known African Americans to have had a documented influence on the development of blackface minstrelsy specifically and American popular music in general.

Old Corn Meal was known for walking through New Orleans singing and dancing while he led his horse and cart and sold corn meal. "Fresh Corn Meal", which he composed, was his signature song; he also did popular material from blackface acts like "Old Rosin the Beau" and "My Long Tail Blue". He was a natural baritone, but he could "easily [transform] into a ringing falsetto". His popularity led to an invitation to perform at the St. Charles Theatre in 1837. There he did a solo act alongside his horse and cart. Old Corn Meal performed there at least once more, in 1840.

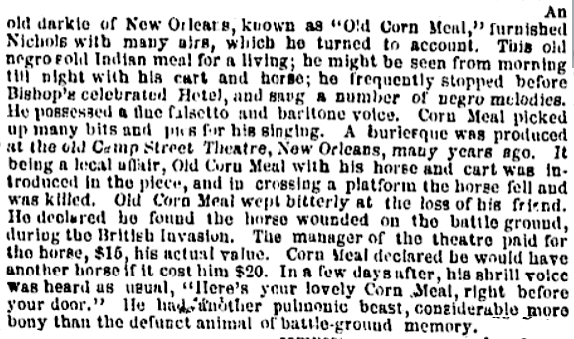
News clipping, November 24, 1860, about white minstrel singer George Nichols and Corn Meal, whose songs Nichols used in his blackface act.

In 1837, "Old Corn Meal" was included in a performance at the recently opened St. Charles Theatre in a melodrama called Life in New Orleans. The newspaper accounts of the performance make clear, Kmen argues, that as a musician he was widely known — he was described in one article as "the celebrated sable satellite," and another mentioned "the popular song Fresh Corn Meal" that he sings. The performance, which featured Old Corn Meal performing on stage the way he did in the street — from his horse-drawn vendor's cart — was such a success that another was organized, though during the second performance his horse fell on stage and was killed. In 1840, he performed at the Camp Street Theater on at least two occasions.

Kmen describes this as "the first appearance of a Negro on the white stage in New Orleans, indeed perhaps in the United States," though at least the latter claim is inaccurate. But his research shows clearly that Old Corn Meal was a much discussed figure, coming up repeatedly in articles in the Picayune during the late 1830s. His death in 1842 was noted in several newspapers. The Bee said: "Poor old Corn Meal . . . is gone. never again shall we listen to his double toned voice — never again shall his corn meal melodies, now grumbled in a bass — now squeaked in a treble, vibrate on the ear. He was a public-spirited a character as any we ever met with, and was as thoroughly known as a popular politician."

== General references ==
- Toll, Robert C. (1974). Blacking Up: The Minstrel Show in Nineteenth-century America. New York: Oxford University Press.
- Watkins, Mel (1994). On the Real Side: Laughing, Lying, and Signifying—The Underground Tradition of African-American Humor that Transformed American Culture, from Slavery to Richard Pryor. New York: Simon & Schuster.
- Kuntz, Andrew. "Fiddle Tune History -- Minstrel Tales: Picayune Butler and Japanese Tommy "Hunky Dory!"". Fiddler Magazine. Archived from the original on 2014-12-13.
