= Thomas D. Rice =

American minstrel performer (1808–1860)

- Born: Thomas Dartmouth Rice; May 20, 1808; New York City, U.S.
- Died: September 19, 1860 (aged 52); New York City, U.S.
- Occupations: Singer, dancer, playwright
- Spouse: Charlotte Bridgett Gladstone (1837–1847)
- Writing career
- Period: 1827–1860

Thomas Dartmouth Rice (May 20, 1808 – September 19, 1860) was an American performer and playwright who performed in blackface and used African-American vernacular speech, song and dance to become one of the most popular minstrel show entertainers of his time. He is considered the "father of American minstrelsy". His act drew on aspects of African-American culture and popularized them with a national, and later international, audience.

Rice's "Jim Crow" character was based on a folk trickster of that name that was long popular among slaves. Rice also adapted and popularized a traditional song of slaves called "Jump Jim Crow". The name became used for the "Jim Crow laws" that enforced racial segregation in the Southern United States between the 1870s and 1965.

== Biography ==
Thomas Dartmouth Rice was born on the Lower East Side of Manhattan, New York. His family resided in the commercial district near the East River docks. Rice received some formal education in his youth, but ceased in his teenage years when he acquired an apprenticeship with a woodcarver named Dodge. Despite this occupational training, Rice quickly made a career as a performer.

By 1827, Rice was a traveling actor, appearing not only as a stock player in several New York theaters, but also performing on frontier stages in the coastal South and the Ohio River valley. According to a former stage colleague, Rice was "tall and wiry, and a great deal on the build of Bob Fitzsimmons, the prizefighter", and according to another account he was at least six feet tall. He frequently told stories of George Washington, who he claimed had been a friend of his father.

== Career ==
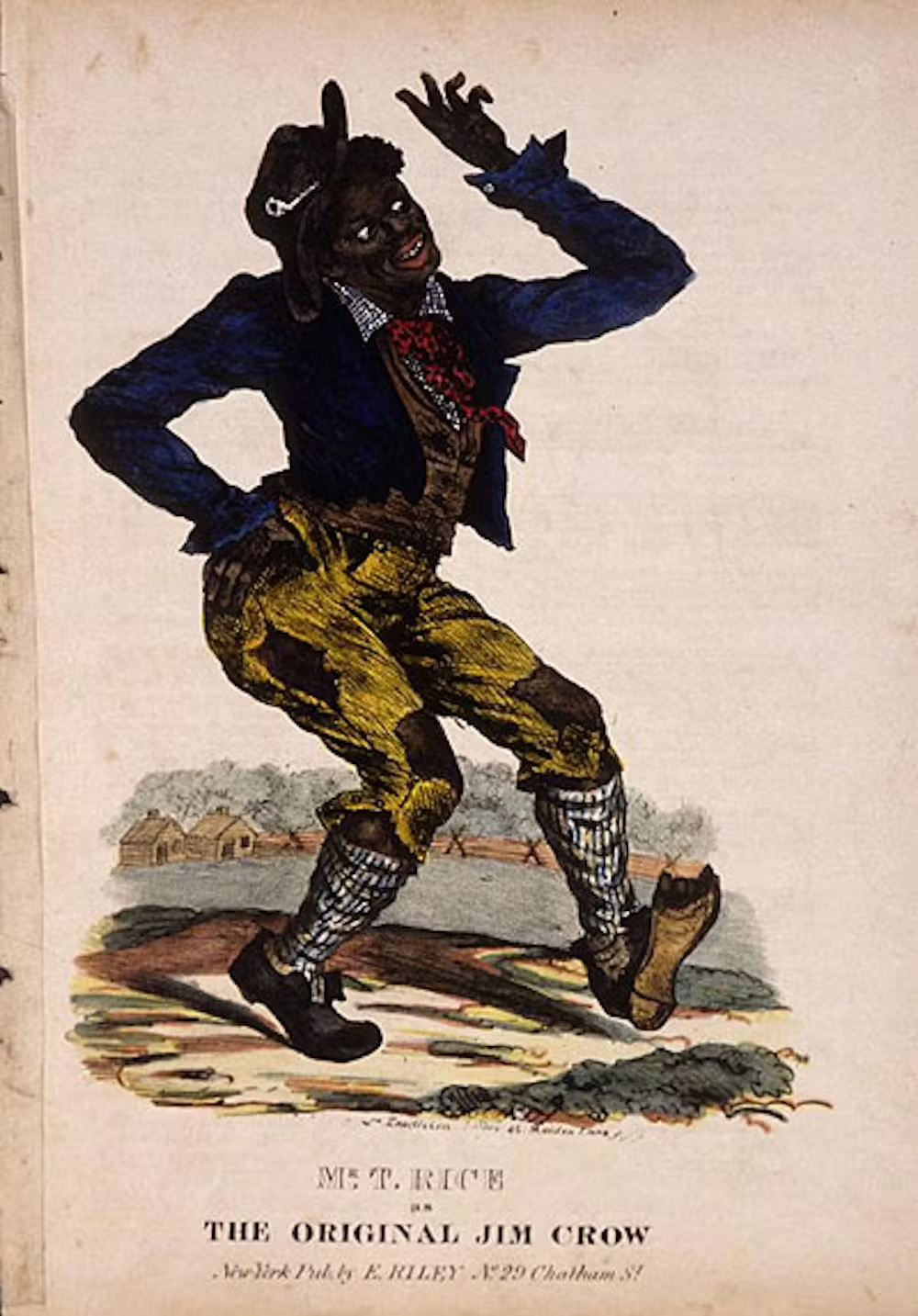
c. 1832 illustration of Rice as Jim Crow

Rice had made the Jim Crow character his signature act by 1832. Rice went from one theater to another, singing his Jim Crow Song. He became known as "Jim Crow Rice". There had been other blackface performers before Rice, however it was Rice who became so indelibly associated with a single character. Rice claimed to have been inspired by a Black stable groom who was crippled, who sang and danced as he did his work, and even claimed to have bought the man's clothes for "authenticity." The time, place and truth of this claim have been disputed.

He soon expanded his repertoire, with his most popular routine being his "shadow dance." Rice would appear on stage carrying a sack slung over his shoulder, then sing the song "Me and My Shadow" (not the better-known 1920s song). As Rice began to dance, a child actor in blackface would crawl out of the sack, and emulate each of Rice's moves and steps. Rice also performed as the "Yankee" character, an already-established stage stereotype who represented rural America and dressed in a long blue coat and striped pants.

Rice's greatest prominence came in the 1830s, before the rise of full-blown blackface minstrel shows, when blackface performances were typically part of a variety show or as an entr'acte in another play.

Rice would sometimes use his songs to spread his personal views, in 1832 he wrote various alternative verses to Jump Jim Crow, one such endorsing Andrew Jackson in the 1832 election and another demonstrating anti-slavery sentiments.

During the years of his peak popularity, from roughly 1832 to 1844, Rice often encountered sold-out houses, with audiences demanding numerous encores. In 1836 he introduced his blackface performances overseas when he appeared in London, although he and his character were known there by reputation at least by 1833.

Rice not only performed in more than 100 plays, but also created plays of his own, providing himself slight variants on the Jim Crow persona—as Cuff in Oh, Hush! (1833), Ginger Blue in Virginia Mummy (1835), and Bone Squash in Bone Squash Diavolo (1835). Shortly after making his first hit in London in Oh, Hush, Rice starred in a more prestigious production, a three-act play at the Adelphi Theatre in London. Moreover, Rice wrote and starred in Otello (1844); he also played the title character in Uncle Tom's Cabin. Starting in 1854 he played in one of the more prominent (and one of the least abolitionist) "Tom shows", loosely based on Harriet Beecher Stowe's book.

"The Virginny Cupids" was an operatic olio and the most popular of the time. It is centered on a song "Coal Black Rose", which predated the playlet. Rice played Cuff, boss of the bootblacks, and he wins the girl, Rose, away from the Black dandy Sambo Johnson, a former bootblack who made money by winning a lottery.

According to Broadbent, "T. D. Rice, the celebrated negro comedian, performed "Jump Jim Crow" with witty local allusions" at Ducrow's Royal Amphitheatre (now The Royal Court Theatre), Liverpool, England.

At least initially, blackface could also give voice to an oppositional dynamic that was prohibited by society. As early as 1832, Rice was singing, "An' I caution all white dandies not to come in my way, / For if dey insult me, dey'll in de gutter lay." It also on occasion equated lower-class white and lower-class Black audiences; while parodying Shakespeare, Rice sang, "Aldough I'm a Black man, de white is call'd my broder."

== Personal life and death ==
On one of his stage tours in England, Rice married Charlotte Bridgett Gladstone in 1837. She died in 1848. They had four children.

Rice enjoyed displaying his wealth, and on his return from London wore a blue dress coat with gold guineas for buttons, and a vest on which each gold button bore a solitaire diamond.

As early as 1840, Rice suffered from a type of paralysis which began to limit his speech and movements, and eventually led to his death on September 19, 1860. His funeral services were at St. Thomas Church and he is interred at Green-Wood Cemetery in Brooklyn, New York. A reminiscence of him in The New York Times suggests his death was alcohol-related, and states that although he had made a considerable fortune in his time, his later years were spent in a liquor saloon and his burial was paid for by public subscription.

== In popular culture ==
In the later half of the 19th century, a wooden statue of Rice in his "Jim Crow" character stood in various New York locations, including outside the Chatham Garden Theatre. It was painted and made in four pieces, with both arms and the right leg below the knee being separate parts screwed to the trunk. Prior to at least 1871 it had stood on Broadway outside "a well-known resort of actors and showmen". According to an article in The New York Times, it had apparently been carved by Rice himself in 1833, although a different account in the same paper says it had been carved by a celebrated figurehead carver called Weeden, and yet another article attributes it to Rice's former employer "Charley" Dodge. It had long been used by Rice as an advertising feature and accompanied him on his successful tour of London.

== Sources ==
- Strausbaugh, John (June 8, 2006). Black Like You: Blackface, Whiteface, Insult and Imitation in American Popular Culture. Jeremy P. Tarcher / Penguin. ISBN 978-1-58542-498-6.
