= List of entertainers who performed in blackface =

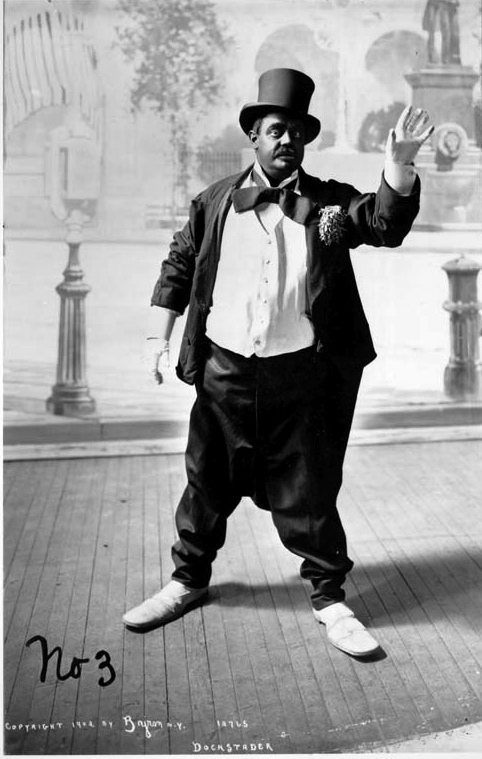
Lew Dockstader

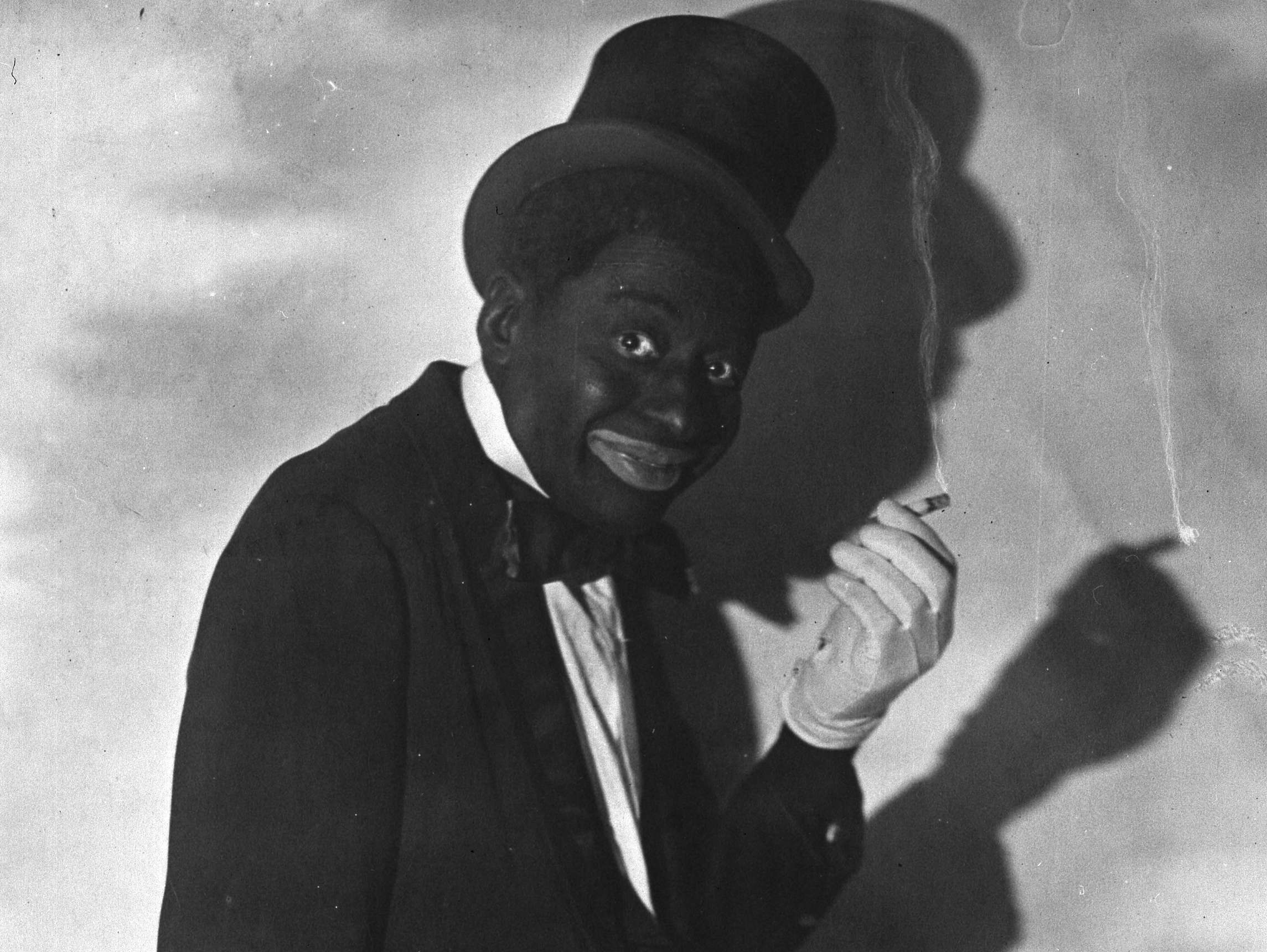
Bert Williams, shown here in blackface, was the highest-paid African-American entertainer of his day.

This is a list of entertainers known to have performed in blackface makeup, whether in a minstrel show, as satire or historical depiction of such roles, or in a portrayal of a character using makeup as a racial disguise, for whatever reason.

== A–C ==
- Roy Acuff, country music singer, performed in blackface in 1930s-40s traveling medicine shows
- Scarlet Adams
- Anne of Denmark, Queen of England, Scotland and Ireland, in The Masque of Blackness
- Ant and Dec, in old Saturday Night Takeaway sketches
- Fred Armisen, impersonating U.S. President Barack Obama on Saturday Night Live in 2008 and 2009
- Clarence Ashley, 1910s-1940s singer and blackface comedian in traveling medicine shows
- Fred Astaire, in Swing Time (1936) and in Easter Parade (1948)
- Gene Autry
- Dan Aykroyd, in Trading Places (1983)
- David Baddiel, while portraying Jason Lee on a 1995 episode of Fantasy Football League
- Rita Baga
- Marcus "Buff" Bagwell, while performing for World Championship Wrestling
- Fay Bainter, as Topsy in a 1933 production of Uncle Tom's Cabin
- Milt G. Barlow, 19th-century American minstrel
- Ethel Barrymore, in the 1930 play Scarlet Sister Mary
- Billy Barty, in Roman Scandals (1933) and Rabbit Test (1978)
- Milton Berle in film Always Leave 'Em Laughing (1949)
- Jack Black, in Be Kind Rewind (2008)
- Sergei Bondarchuk, in Othello (1956)
- John Boulter, lead singer of the long-running Black and White Minstrel Show on the BBC
- Zach Braff, in the Scrubs episodes "My Friend the Doctor" and "My Chopped Liver"
- Frank Brower, 1840s-1860s minstrel performer
- David Byrne, in a promotional video for Stop Making Sense (1984)
- George Burns
- Butterbeans and Susie
- John Byner, in season 3, episode 1 of Soap
- Eddie Cantor, 1912-1927 performances in vaudeville and Ziegfeld Follies
- Luke Carroll, an Aboriginal Australian actor, wore blackface in a dream sequence featured in the movie Stone Bros.
- Judy Carne, in a 1969 episode of Rowan & Martin's Laugh-In
- Graham Chapman
- Dave Chappelle, in a 2006 episode of Chappelle's Show
- George Christy, born George Harrington but became a star with Christy's Minstrels in the 1840s
- J. A. Coburn
- Charles Correll
- Bing Crosby, in Dream House (1932), Mississippi (1935), Road to Singapore (1940), Holiday Inn (1942), Dixie (1943), and Here Come the Waves (1944)
- Billy Crystal, in the "Negro Leagues" skit on Saturday Night Live in 1984 and whenever impersonating Sammy Davis Jr., including at the 84th Academy Awards.

== D–G ==
- Roger Daltrey in the CSI: Crime Scene Investigation episode "Living Legend".
- Ted Danson, at a 1993 Friars Club roast of his then-girlfriend Whoopi Goldberg
- Tommy Davidson in the 2000 film Bamboozled
- Marion Davies in Going Hollywood (1933)
- Shane Dawson, YouTuber, actor, and comedian
- Neil Diamond in The Jazz Singer
- Thomas Dilward, 1850s-1870s dwarf minstrel performer
- George Washington Dixon, 1820s-1830s stage performer
- Lew Dockstader, 1870s-1900s minstrel performer
- Roma Downey in an episode of the television series Touched By An Angel entitled “Black Like Monica”, the character is turned black to better empathize with a community dealing with racial tensions.
- Robert Downey Jr. in the 2008 film Tropic Thunder
- Drake, during a 2007 photo shoot with photographer David Leyes, with one of the photos being used as the cover of Pusha-T's diss track, The Story of Adidon
- Jimmy Durante
- Issi Dye, singer and Al Jolson impersonator
- Harry Enfield, impersonating Nelson Mandela in the television show Harry & Paul, and playing Norbert Smith playing Nelson Mandela in Norbert Smith: A Life.
- The Ethiopian Serenaders, a Boston minstrel troupe who performed at the White House in 1844 and then toured Britain.
- Jimmy Fallon, impersonating Chris Rock on Saturday Night Live
- Benny Fine of the Fine Brothers, in a two-parter Degrassi parody by Shane Dawson where he plays the character of Connor DeLaurier
- Edwin Forrest
- Dai Francis, lead singer of the long-running Black and White Minstrel Show on the BBC
- Leigh Francis
- The Frogs, in the artwork for their album Racially Yours and in their stage attire for the accompanying tour.
- Judy Garland in Babes in Arms
- George Givot, in the play The Constant Sinner (1931)
- Freeman Gosden
- Billy Gould (1869–1950)
- Savion Glover in the 2000 film Bamboozled

== H–L ==
- Bill Hader, while impersonating Al Pacino acting as Dr. Conrad Murray in a biopic on a skit for Saturday Night Live
- Sam Hague
- Masatoshi Hamada, while impersonating Eddie Murphy from the film Beverly Hills Cop for the 2017 New Year's Eve special of Downtown no Gaki no Tsukai ya Arahende!!
- Jon Hamm on an episode of 30 Rock
- Goldie Hawn, in a 1969 episode of Rowan & Martin's Laugh-In
- Bob Height
- Al Herman
- Charles Hicks
- Ernest Hogan
- C. Thomas Howell in the 1986 movie Soul Man
- William A. Huntley Starting 1860. Moved to whiteface in mid-1880s.
- Betty Hutton in The Perils of Pauline (1947) and Somebody Loves Me (1952)
- Dick Powell performed in blackface while singing Al Jolson's "Sonny Boy" in Hard to Get (1938)
- George Jessel
- Al Jolson
- Louis Jordan
- Buster Keaton, in vaudeville in the short film Neighbors (1920), possibly with satiric intent: he alternates in and out of blackface, receiving a very different reaction from a policeman; also in The Playhouse (1921) and College (1927)
- Billy Kersands, 1880s-1900s minstrel performer
- Jimmy Kimmel, impersonating Karl Malone and Oprah Winfrey on The Man Show
- Jane Krakowski twice on 30 Rock
- Wallace King, 1880s minstrel performer
- Joey Lawrence, in season 4, episode 11 of Gimme a Break!, an episode criticizing blackface
- Jennie Lee, in the 1915 film The Birth of a Nation
- Francis Leon, 1870s-80s minstrel performer
- Eddie Leonard, 1890s-1930s minstrel performer, "last of the great minstrels"
- Paul Levesque
- Chris Lilley as Jonah Takalua and S.mouse
- Walter Long, in the 1915 film The Birth of a Nation
- Sophia Loren in Aida (1953)
- Peter Lorre, in the play Weisse Fracht
- Matt Lucas, multiple characters in Little Britain, Precious Little in Come Fly with Me
- Sam Lucas, 1870s minstrel performer

== M–R ==
- Robert Mandan, in season 3, episode 1 of Soap
- Jenna Marbles, in a now-deleted 2011 YouTube video where she impersonates Nicki Minaj
- Pigmeat Markham, performer in 1920s-1950s traveling shows, as well as The Ed Sullivan Show and Rowan & Martin's Laugh-In
- Rob McElhenney on It's Always Sunny in Philadelphia, portraying the character of Mac, a white man portraying the character Roger Murtaugh from the Lethal Weapon franchise in a fanmade home movie
- Joni Mitchell appeared as black dandy "Art Nouveau" at a party, then on the cover of Don Juan's Reckless Daughter in 1977 and on numerous occasions throughout the 1980s (see Joni Mitchell blackface controversy)
- Emmett Miller, an important influence on early country stars like Jimmie Rodgers and Bob Wills
- Flournoy E. Miller
- Irvin C. Miller
- David Mitchell, in season 1, episode 1 of That Mitchell and Webb Look
- Clayton McMichen
- Bill Monroe
- Moran and Mack
- Herbert Wassell Nadal (1873–1957)
- Cornelius J. O'Brien (1869–1954)
- Laurence Olivier in Othello (1965)
- Kaitlin Olson on It's Always Sunny in Philadelphia, portraying the character of Deandra Reynolds, a white woman portraying a black character in a fanmade home movie based on the Lethal Weapon franchise
- Pat Paulsen doing a deadpan condemnation of ethnic humor on The Merv Griffin Show, but it wasn't aired
- Richard Pelham
- Arthur Petersen, in season 3, episode 1 of Soap
- Larry Parks, in the 1946 film The Jolson Story
- Thomas D. Rice
- Jimmie Rodgers
- Mickey Rooney in Babes in Arms (1939)
- Benny Rubin
- Flora Robson, as Angelique Buiton in Saratoga Trunk (1945).

== S–Z ==
- Harry Scott of the comedy duo Scott and Whaley, an African American act working in Britain.
- Ramblin' Tommy Scott
- Leon Schuster, performed in blackface in Mama Jack (2005).
- George Siegmann in character as Silas Lynch in The Birth of a Nation (1915)
- Sarah Silverman, in episode "Face Wars" (2007) of The Sarah Silverman Program
- Gregory Smith (actor) in Krippendorf's Tribe (1998).
- Frank Sinatra, in the Major Bowes short The Big Minstrel (1935) and Ocean's Eleven (1960)
- Grace Slick, The Smothers Brothers Comedy Hour (1968) and Teen Set magazine (1969)
- Bessie Smith
- Hobart Smith
- Mel Smith in season 2, episode 4, of Not the Nine O'Clock News (sketch "Gone With The Wind", April 1980)
- Howard Stern in a series of 1991 skits as Clarence Thomas and in a 1993 New Year's Eve special
- Bert Swor (1878–1943)
- Magda Szubanski, in various sketches for the Australian TV series, Fast Forward, most notably as the housemaid in a parody of Gone With the Wind.
- Shirley Temple in The Littlest Rebel
- Frank Tinney, in vaudeville and Broadway musical comedies
- The Three Stooges
- Lily Tomlin, as R&B singer Pervis Hawkins on CBS special and Saturday Night Live.
- Sophie Tucker
- Tracey Ullman, in a 1989 episode of The Tracey Ullman Show
- Ben Vereen, as a part of the 1981 inaugural celebrations for US President Ronald Reagan
- Glen Vernon Actor who performed in blackface in Hollywood Varieties (1950) with fellow actor Edward Ryan
- Vladimir Vysotsky, as Abram Gannibal in How Czar Peter the Great Married Off His Moor
- Wendy van Dijk, as the character 'Lucretia Martina'.
- Ted Waldman, comedy harmonica player
- David Walliams, as a minstrel, and as character Desiree Devere in Little Britain
- George Walker
- Sean Waltman
- Robert Webb
- Betty White, in The Golden Girls
- Billy Whitlock
- Gene Wilder in Silver Streak
- Barney Williams
- Bert Williams
- Hank Williams
- Slim Williams
- Bob Wills
- Tom Wilson
- Jane Withers in Can This Be Dixie?
- Jo Anne Worley, in a 1969 episode of Rowan & Martin's Laugh-In

== Fictional characters who were depicted in blackface ==
- Bugs Bunny, in the 1942 cartoon Fresh Hare
- Mickey Mouse, in the 1933 cartoon Mickey's Mellerdrammer
- Tom and Jerry (Van Beuren), Not to be confused with the cat and mouse duo. appeared in blackface in 'Plane Dumb' (1932)
- Smith Family Stan, Steve, Hayley and Francine Smith appeared in blackface in 2007 American Dad! episode 'An Apocalypse to Remember'
- Eric Cartman, Depicted in blackface in 1999 movie South Park: Bigger, Longer & Uncut and in episodes of South Park
- Chris Griffin in the Family Guy episode of Halloween on Spooner Street (2010)
- Tom and Jerry, appeared in blackface in 'The Yankee Doodle Mouse' (1943) 'The Milky Waif' (1946) 'Mouse Cleaning' (1948) and 'Casanova Cat' (1951)
- Dirty Dick, Used blackface in a recreation of The Black and White Minstrel Show in the 1972 Dandy Annual
- Sylvester the Cat, appeared in blackface in 'I Taw a Putty Tat' (1948)
- Lyons Tea Minstrels mascots of Lyons Tea. Discontinued sometime in the 1990s
- Ling-Ling, In "Foxxy Vs. The Board Of Education" (2005)

== See also ==
- Examples of yellowface
