= List of blackface minstrel troupes =

This is a list of blackface minstrel troupes, a 19th- and 20th-century American form of musical theater.

== A ==
- Adams and Lee

== B ==
- Backus' Minstrels
- Barlow Bros. Minstrel, later Great Barlow Minstrels
- Barney Fagan's Minstrels
- Brooker and Clayton's Georgia Minstrels
- Bryant's Minstrels
- Buckley's Serenaders (also known as Buckley's Congo Melodists, Buckley's New Orleans Serenaders, New Orleans Serenaders)

== C ==
- Callender's Georgia Minstrels
- Cal. Wagner’s Minstrels
- Campbell's Minstrels
- Carncross' Minstrels
- Chicago Minstrels
- Christy Minstrels (also known as George Christy Minstrels)

== D ==
- Dockstader and Cleveland's
- Duprez & Benedict's Minstrels

== E ==
- Ethiopian Serenaders (also known as Boston Minstrels, Ethiopian Melodists, Ethiopian Minstrels)

== G ==
- Gavitt's Original Ethiopian Serenaders
- George Mitchell Minstrels
- Georgia Minstrels, later Haverly's European Minstrels
- George Thatcher's Greatest Minstrels

== H ==
- Haverly's United Mastodon Minstrels
- Honey Boy Hotchkiss Minstrels

== J ==
- J.A. Coburn's Greater Minstrels, later J.A. Coburn's Minstrels
- Johnson's Dixie Minstrels

== K ==
- Kunkel's Nightingales

== M ==
- Madame Rentz's Female Minstrels
- McNish, Johnson and Slavin's Minstrels

== O ==
- Ole Bull Band of Serenaders
- Ordway's Aeolians

== P ==
- Primrose and Dockstader's Minstrel Men
- Primrose and West's Minstrels

== R ==
- Rice and Barton Company

== S ==
- Sable Brothers and Sisters
- Sable Harmonists
- Sam Hague's Minstrels
- San Francisco Minstrels
- Sanford's Opera Troupe (also known as Sanford's Minstrels)

== T ==
- Thatcher and Ryman's Minstrels

== V ==
- Virginia Minstrels (also known as Virginia Serenaders)

== W ==
- White's Serenaders (also known as White's Minstrels)
- Wood's Minstrels (also known as Christy and Wood's Minstrels)
- W. S. Cleveland and Company

== See also ==
- List of entertainers known to have performed in blackface
