= Horace Weston =

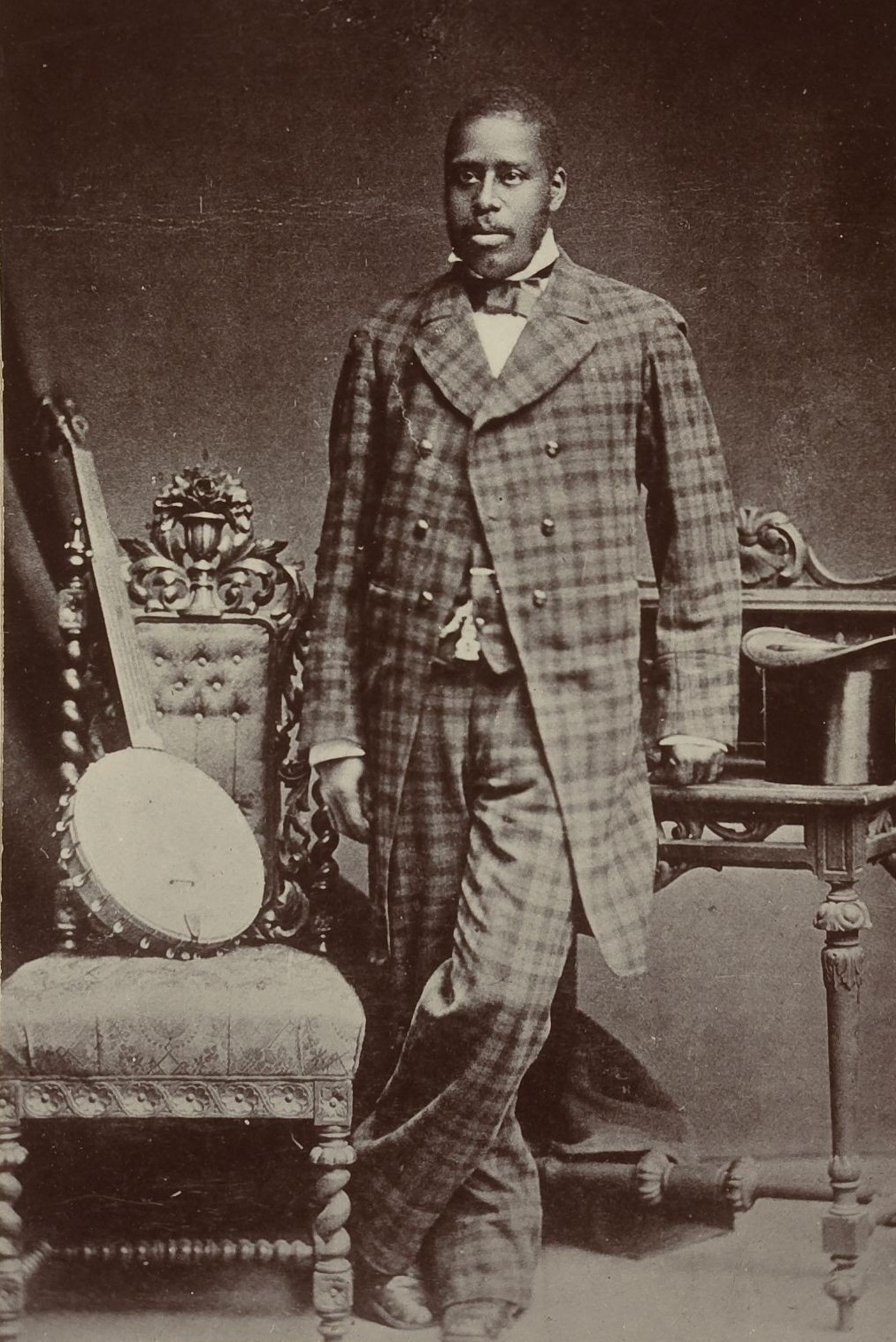

Background information
- Born: c. 1825; Derby, Connecticut, U.S.
- Died: May 22, 1890 (aged 65) Manhattan, New York City, U.S.
- Genre: Minstrelsy
- Occupations: Musician, composer
- Instrument: Banjo
- Years active: 1850s–1890

Horace Weston (c. 1825 – May 22, 1890) was an American musician, regarded as one of the finest banjo players of all time.

== Biography ==
A free-born African American, he was born in Derby, Connecticut, though there is uncertainty over his year of birth. Contemporary obituaries gave his age as 65 and year of birth as 1825, but some researchers suggest a later date. As a child, he moved to Waterbury. His father was a musician, and a music and dancing teacher.

Horace left home as a child, learned several musical instruments when young, including accordion, violin, and guitar, and worked as a dance teacher. He traveled in New York state, and after breaking his guitar began learning the banjo. After a while he began playing banjo in the streets of Hartford, Connecticut. In 1861, he tried but failed to join the United States Army, as no black volunteers were accepted at the time, but joined the U.S. Navy in Boston. He entertained fellow crew members with his banjo playing, before joining the 54th Massachusetts Volunteer Regiment.

He was discharged in 1863, and joined Buckley's Serenaders in Boston. He then played with the Georgia Colored Minstrels in 1867, before working for over a year in theatres in New York City. Over the next few years, he played with various minstrel shows in Boston and New York, and toured Canada, as well as undertaking work in theatres. He was also a popular and successful teacher of the banjo. Regarded as a virtuoso player, he played banjo mainly in the "stroke style", similar to "frailing".

From 1876, he was under contract to producers Henry C. Jarrett and Henry Palmer. He played on the boat Plymouth Rock, and then in the company's production of Uncle Tom's Cabin, which they presented in Europe in 1878. Weston became highly successful in London. He met the Prince of Wales after one performance, and was then invited to perform for Queen Victoria. Though reports at the time claimed that Weston was illiterate and had ignored the written invitation, not knowing its significance, Weston himself later said that, when the letter was retrieved, he saw that the date of the audience had not yet passed and that "we succeeded in patching up the matter". It is not clear whether the performance took place, but it was said that, on a return visit in the 1880s, he was awarded a gold medal by the queen.

After returning to the U.S., he played for several years with Haverly's Georgia Minstrels and other companies in New York and Boston, before touring the U.S. with Callender's Minstrels as far as Oregon. On his return, he played a residency in Philadelphia, before again travelling in touring companies. Towards the end of his career, he performed with the Ringling Bros. and Barnum & Bailey Circus.

He was among the first African Americans to gain a significant reputation as a musician, was a major star of minstrel shows, and was billed as "The World's Greatest Banjoist". He became associated with the S. S. Stewart banjo making firm, who built instruments to his design. He composed several pieces of banjo music, including "Horace Weston's Home Sweet Home," "Horace Weston's New Schottische," "Horace Weston's Old-Time Jig," and "Weston's Great Minor Jig." At the time of his death, he was considered "perhaps the greatest banjoist the world has ever heard."

In later years he was increasingly affected by rheumatism and then by dropsy, which led to his death at his home in Bleecker Street, New York, in 1890. He was buried at Evergreens Cemetery.

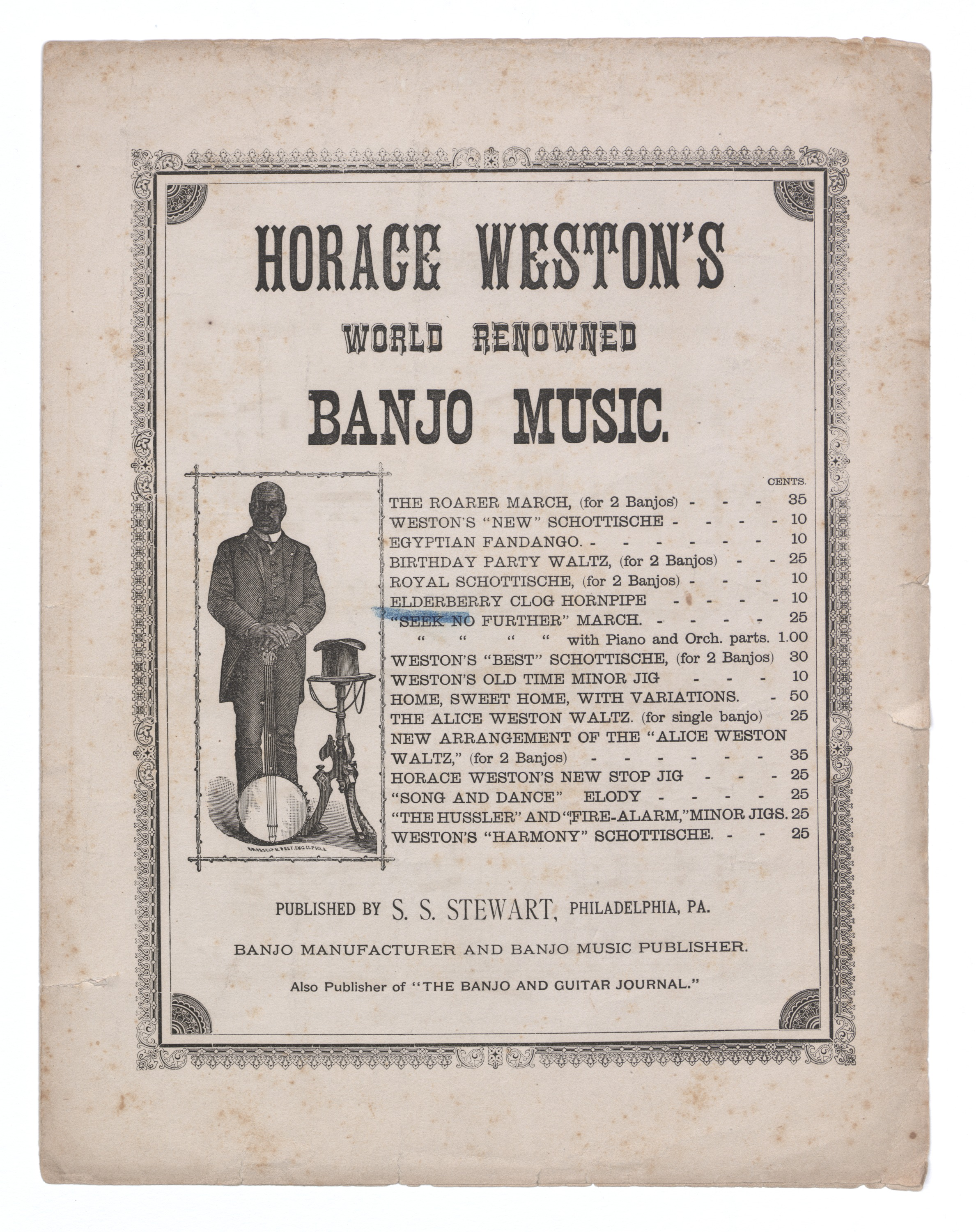
Advertisement listing Horace Weston's banjo compositions.

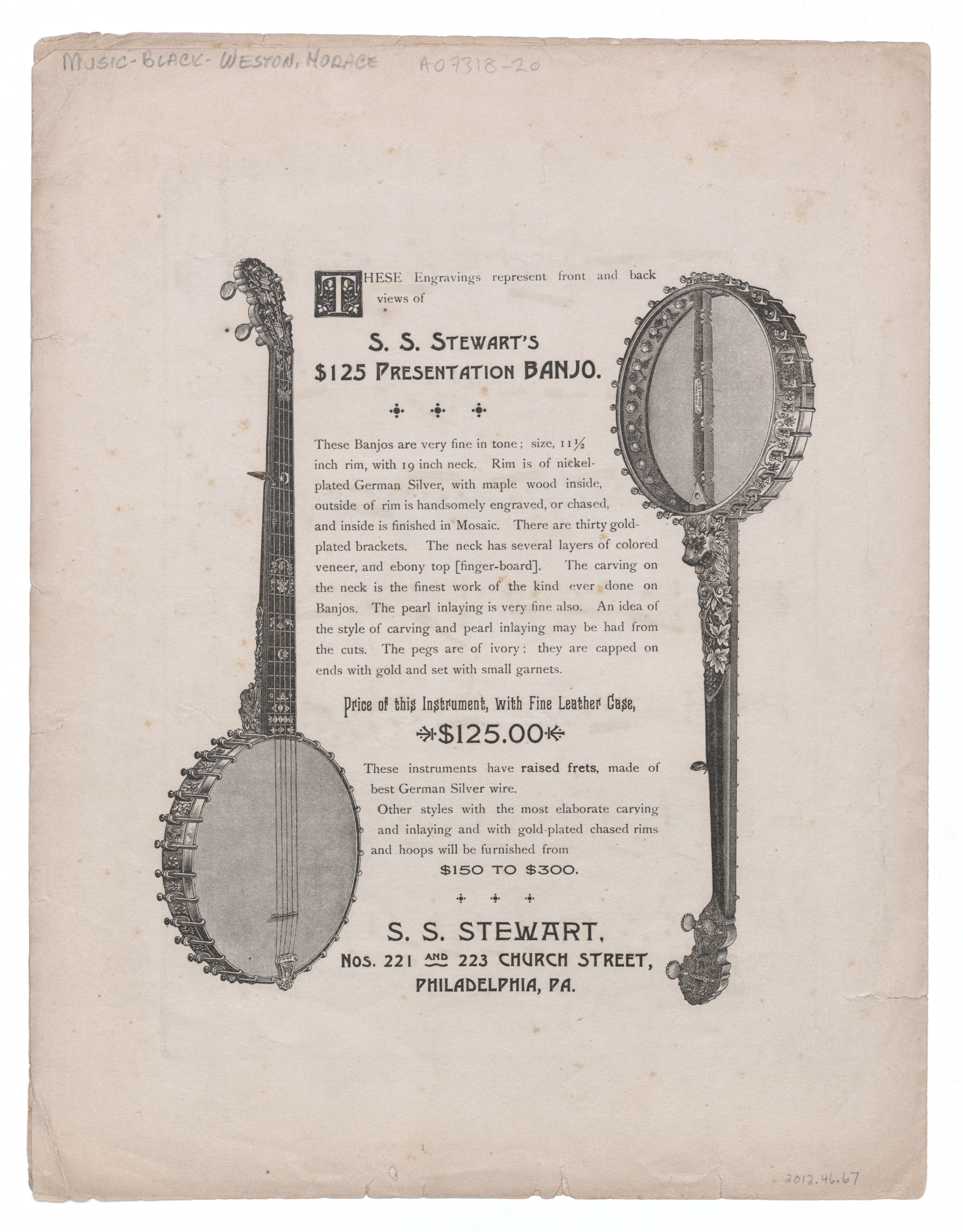
Advertisement: S. S. Stewart's Presentation Banjo, included in Horace Weston's "Seek No Further March" sheet music.

Horace Weston's "Seek No Further March" sheet music.
