= Sam Hague =

British entertainer

Sam Hague (1828 – 7 January 1901) was a British blackface minstrel performer, dancer, and troupe owner. He was a pioneering white owner of a minstrel troupe composed of black members, and the success he saw with this troupe inspired many other white minstrel managers to tour with black companies.

== Early life ==
Hague was born in 1828, in Sheffield, England. In his youth launched a career as a clog dancer.

== Career ==
In 1850, he moved with his brothers Tom and William to America, where they toured as the Brothers Hague Concert Party. He went on to partner two other renowned cloggers, Dublin-born Tim Hayes and fellow Yorkshireman Dick Sands, in the leading minstrel and variety theaters.

He co-managed Wagner and Hague's Pontoon Minstrels, touring the western states, then briefly retired from show business in 1866, opening the Champion Shades bar with his brother Tom opposite the Mechanics Hall theater in Utica, New York. A visit to Utica by W.H. Lee's Slave Troupe of Georgia Minstrels, a company made up of genuinely black minstrels, inspired Hague to purchase the group and launch a tour of England. Hague's troupe, which included variety star Japanese Tommie, debuted at the Theatre Royal, Liverpool. The troupe was initially a failure in both Liverpool and on tour, but business picked up when Hague added white singers and instrumentalists, retaining only a few "colored" specialty performers. The successful combination began an 18-year career based at St. James's Hall, Liverpool.

Sam Hague's Slave Troupe of Georgia Minstrels included both white and black performers, though at each venue they put on separate all-white and all-black performances. In England, Hague eventually counted stars such as Bob Height and Charles Hicks among his troupers. Hague's overseas success lent black minstrelsy a new credibility in the United States, although at least one critic maintained their rise had damaged minstrelsy, and that white blackface minstrels were better at representing black Americans than black Americans were themselves. By the mid-1870s, most successful American black troupes had been bought by white owners who had followed Hague's lead. When the Slave Troupe returned to the United States, Charles Callender purchased the company.

Five years after Hague sold the troupe, on an expedition to the Minstrel Troupe Owners Symposium in October 1879, he was introduced to his future wife, Clare Thiele.

By 1881, Hague owned a white minstrel troupe composed of British players, Sam Hague's Operatic British Minstrels. The British had a reputation in America for not being as apt at portraying caricatured black roles or performing comedy bits. In response, Sam Hague's British Minstrels stressed their musical abilities and their refined costumes and sets. Only the endmen wore blackface, and the troupe did no base comedy. George Primrose and William H. West adopted Hague's idea and sparked a new trend in minstrelsy.

The twice-married Hague died January 7, 1901, at home in Liverpool. He left a wife and adopted daughter.
