= Old Aunt Jemima =

1875 song by Billy Kersands

Song
- Written: 1875
- Genre: Folk
- Songwriter: Billy Kersands

"Old Aunt Jemima" is an American folk song written by comedian, songwriter, and minstrel show performer Billy Kersands. The song became the inspiration for the Aunt Jemima brand of pancakes, as well as several characters in film, television, and on radio, named "Aunt Jemima".

Kersands wrote his first version of "Old Aunt Jemima" in 1875 and it became his most popular song. Author Robert Toll claimed that Kersands had performed the song over 2,000 times by 1877. There were at least three different sets of "Old Aunt Jemima" lyrics by 1889.

Often, "Old Aunt Jemima" was sung while a man in drag, playing the part of Aunt Jemima, performed on stage. It was not uncommon for the Aunt Jemima character to be played by a white man in blackface. Other minstrels incorporated Aunt Jemima into their acts, so Aunt Jemima became a common figure in minstrelsy. Other songs about Aunt Jemima were written, such as "Aunt Jemima Song" and "Aunt Jemima's Picnic Day".

== Lyrics ==
One version of "Old Aunt Jemima" began with a stanza expressing dissatisfaction with the dullness of worship services in white churches, such as a complaint about the length of the prayers. The song ended with the following two stanzas:

The monkey dressed in soldier clothes,
Old Aunt Jemima, oh! oh! oh!
Went out in the woods for to drill some crows,
Old Aunt Jemima, oh! oh! oh!
The jay bird hung on the swinging limb,
Old Aunt Jemima, oh! oh! oh!
I up with a stone and hit him on the shin,
Old Aunt Jemima, oh! oh! oh!
Oh, Carline, oh, Carline,
Can't you dance the bee line,
Old Aunt Jemima, oh! oh! oh!
The bullfrog married the tadpole's sister,
Old Aunt Jemima, oh! oh! oh!
He smacked his lips and then he kissed her,
Old Aunt Jemima, oh! oh! oh!
She says if you love me as I love you,
Old Aunt Jemima, oh! oh! oh!
No knife can cut our love in two,
Old Aunt Jemima, oh! oh! oh!
Oh, Carline, oh, Carline,
Can't you dance the bee line,
Old Aunt Jemima, oh! oh! oh!

Some variants of the song substituted "pea-vine" for "bee line". Another version included the verse:

My old missus promise me,
Old Aunt Jemima, oh! oh! oh!
When she died she-d set me free,
Old Aunt Jemima, oh! oh! oh!
She lived so long her head got bald,
Old Aunt Jemima, oh! oh! oh!
She swore she would not die at all,
Old Aunt Jemima, oh! oh! oh!

Sterling Stuckey maintains that Kersands did not write all of these lyrics, but adapted many of them from "slave songs" (such as field hollers and work songs).

== Sources ==
- Manring, M. M. (1998). Slave in a Box: The Strange Career of Aunt Jemima. University of Virginia Press. ISBN 978-0-8139-1811-2.
- Toll, Robert (1977). Blacking Up: The Minstrel Show in Nineteenth Century America. Oxford University Press. ISBN 0-19-502172-X.
- Witt, Doris (2004) [1999]. Black Hunger: Soul Food And America. Minneapolis, Minnesota: University of Minnesota Press. ISBN 978-0-8166-4551-0.
