= J. A. Coburn =

American minstrel performer, manager (1868–1943)

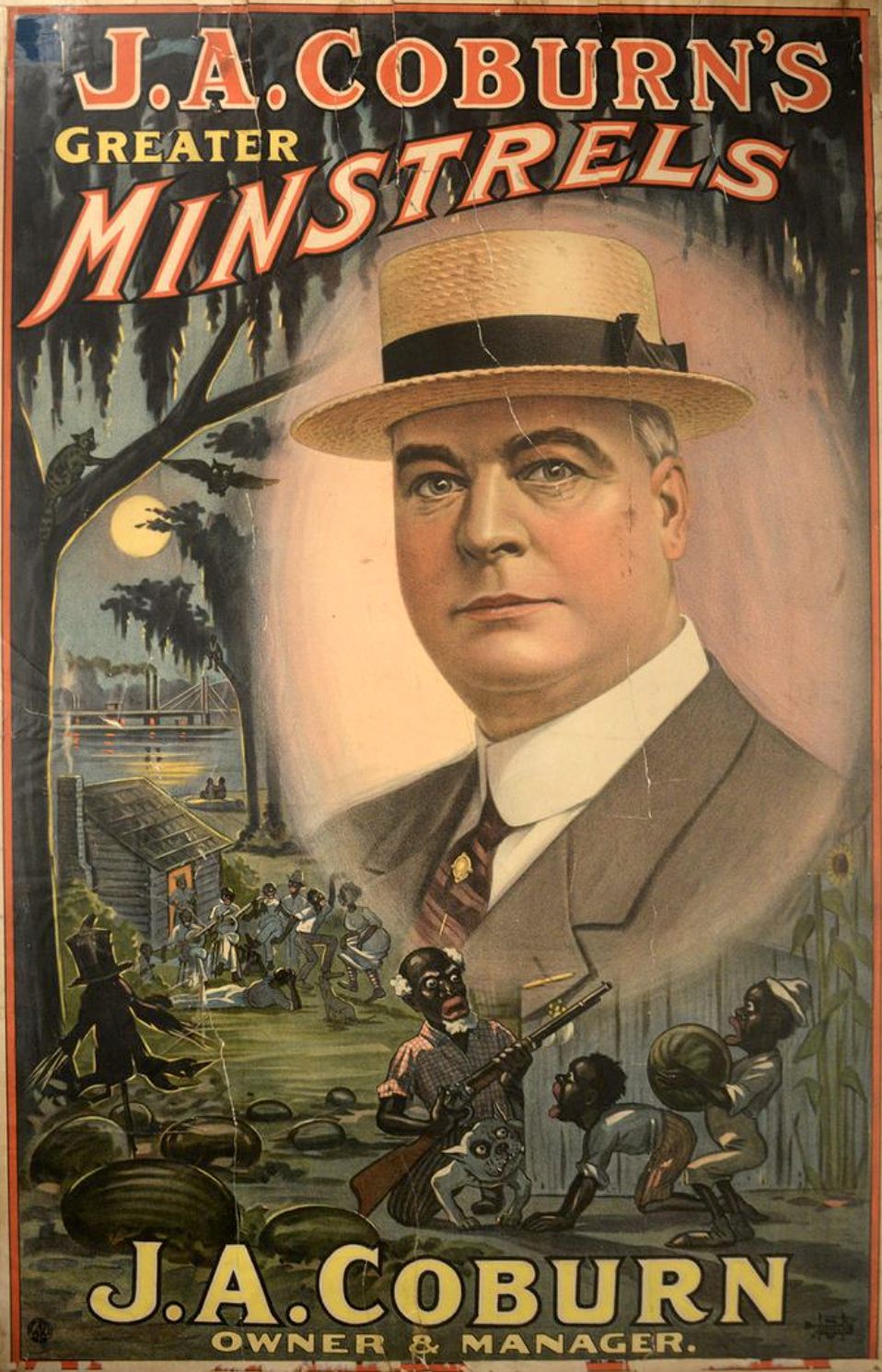
- J. A. Coburn (1890) on a show advertisement poster
- Born: John Arthur Coburn; 1868; Boston, Massachusetts, U.S.
- Died: March 5, 1943; Daytona Beach, Florida, U.S.
- Other names: Cobe Coburn, Joe Coburn, Pop Coburn
- Occupation(s): Minstrel troupe manager, musician, theater company owner, bandleader, comedian, businessman
- Years active: 1886 – c. 1927
- Spouse: Nettie Alice Linville (m. 1939–1943; his death)

John Arthur "Cobe" Coburn (1868 – March 5, 1943), more commonly known as J.A. Coburn, was an American minstrel troupe manager, theater company owner, musician, and businessman. He was known for his traveling Blackface minstrel shows, and had worked as a professional cornetist, and later as a bandleader. He was associated with the Barlow Bros. Minstrel, and J.A. Coburn's Greater Minstrels. Coburn lived in Daytona, Florida.

== Life and career ==
John Arthur Coburn was born in 1868, in Boston. During his early life he was as a cornetist for the Elgin National Watch Company's military band.

In 1886, he started his musical theater career in forming Trewetz and Coburn. This was followed by Coburn joining Louis Baldwin in 1890, for a few years of performances until Baldwin's death in 1903. His first minstrel show was in 1893, with the W. S. Cleveland and Company, led by William S. Cleveland (1860–1923). By 1898, Coburn had formed and directed his own theater company named the Barlow Bros. Minstrel (later known as the Great Barlow Minstrels).

Barlow Bros. Minstrel was re-organized to form J.A. Coburn's Greater Minstrels (later known as J.A. Coburn's Minstrels). Notable performers in the troupe included Singin' Sam, Hank White, Dan Holt, and Charley Gano.

On November 14, 1915, J.A. Coburn's Minstrels paraded in Columbus, Mississippi, which was documented by the Columbus Commercial (1893–1922) newspaper.

Coburn married Nettie Alice Linville in 1939, and together they had one daughter. His daughter Leota Estelle Coburn was a musical performer, who went by the stage name Leota Cordati Coburn.

== See also ==
- List of entertainers who performed in blackface
- List of blackface minstrel troupes
