= Singin' Sam =

American singer and actor

Singin' Sam (January 27, 1888, Springfield, Ohio – June 12, 1948, Richmond, Indiana), also known as Harry Frankel, was an American minstrel performer, vaudevillian and popular personality during the early days of radio. He was best known as "Singin' Sam, the Barbasol Man" for his long association with that company.

== Early life ==
The son of clothing merchant Sol Frankel, Harry grew up in Danville, Kentucky, singing in various quartets, moving with his parents to Richmond, Indiana, when he was nine years old. He joined J.A. Coburn's Minstrels in 1908, and later toured with Al G. Field's Minstrels. Frankel and Joe Dunlevy were known as the "Two Blackbirds" when they performed in vaudeville theaters during the late 1920s.

== Career and personal life ==
When Frankel began in radio in 1930 on WLW (Cincinnati, Ohio), sponsored by the Great States Lawn Mower Company, he started using Singin' Sam as his professional name, and he was also known at that time as "The Lawnmower Man." In New York he began as "Singin' Sam the Barbasol Man" on WABC on July 20, 1931. He disliked New York, and three years later, he returned to Richmond, Indiana, with vocalist Helene "Smiles" Davis, (Note: Helen "Smiles" Davis (né Helen Sylvia Davis; 1890–1981) had earlier been married, from 1908 to 1916, to Ned Wayburn (1874–1972), with whom she had a son, Edward Claudius Wayburn, Jr. (1909–2010).) so named because of her identification with the (then new) song "Smiles" while singing to the troops during World War I. The couple married May 2, 1934, in Richmond and lived first on their 5-acre (20,000 m^{2}) farm, known as Just-a-Mere Farm, ll miles west of town on the National Road (now U.S. Route 40). They later lived on a small farm on the southeast side of Richmond with a large colonial revival house with a pool and several outbuildings. In late 1934, Singin' Sam returned to broadcasting after Barbasol arranged to do his show live from Cincinnati, an easy commute. Frankel was Jewish in an Indiana community where Jews played important social, cultural, and economic roles.

He continued with Barbasol until 1941, and during that time, he also did shows for Coca-Cola, flying to New York on alternate weeks to make transcriptions for his weekly 15-minute Refreshment Time with Singin' Sam, which aired from 1937 to 1942. In total, he made 260 transcriptions for the syndicated program.

He retired about a year before his death.

He died in hospital in Richmond of a heart attack in 1948.

== Others ==
Harry Frankel should not be confused with country singer Singin' Sam Agins (1919–1996) and others who adopted the name.
