= Charles Hicks =

American entertainer

Charles Barney Hicks (died 1902) was an American advance man, manager, performer, and owner of blackface minstrel troupes composed of African-American performers. Hicks himself was a minstrel performer who could sing and play challenging roles such as the minstrel-show interlocutor or endmen. However, he was most interested in the business side of minstrelsy. Over the course of his career, he worked with most successful black minstrel troupes as manager, owner or both. The white-dominated minstrel market proved hostile to a black owner, and Hicks (like his contemporary, Lew Johnson) had to travel abroad or manage for white owners in order to make a reliable living. Nevertheless, both white and black rivals came to respect him. One observer in 1891 wrote, "This man Hicks was a dangerous man to all outside managers and they all were afraid of him." In 1912, Hicks was the sole African American listed on M. B. Leavitt's list of "best known advance agents during the last fifty years".

== Career ==
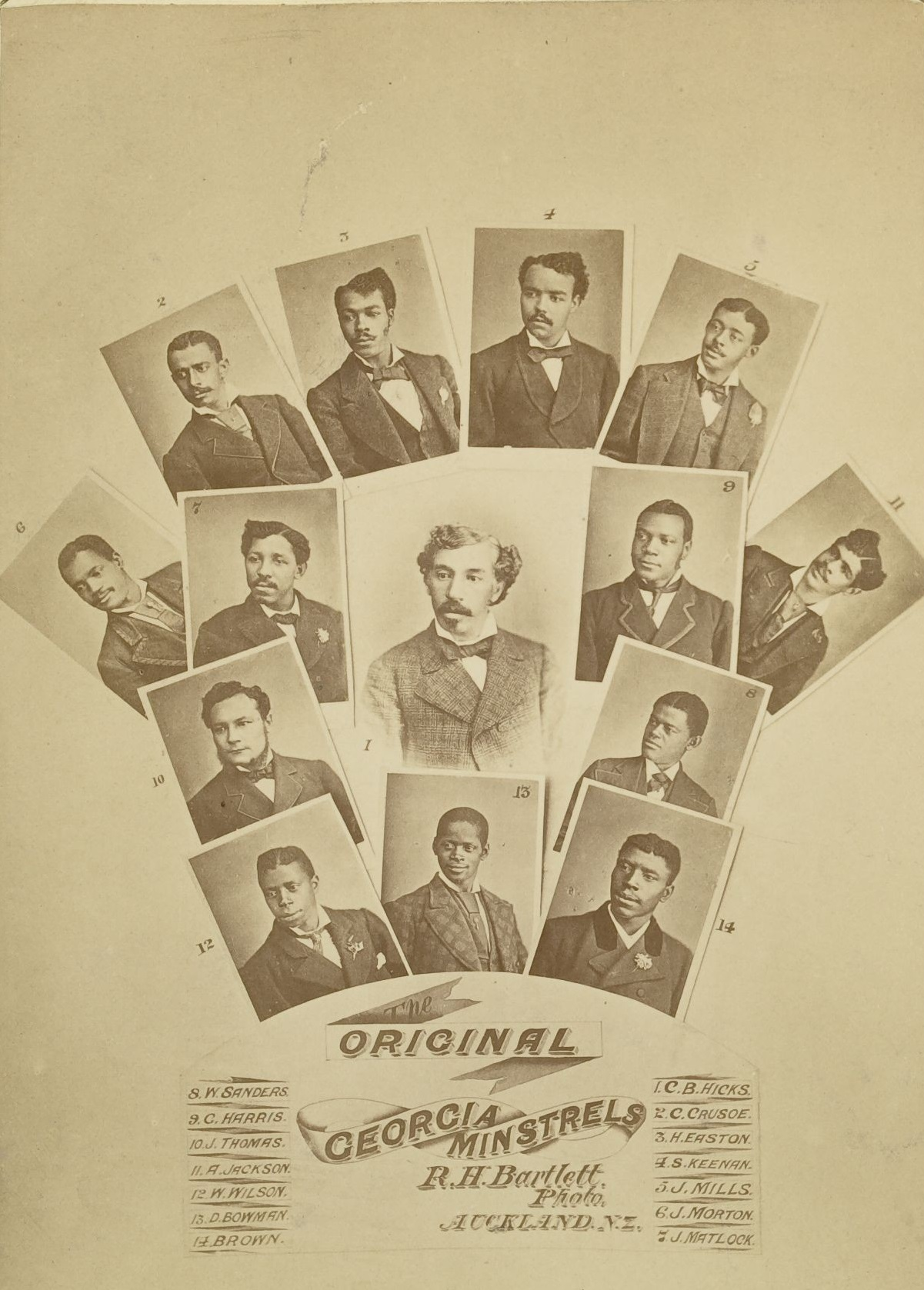
"Original Georgia Minstrels" composite image with founder Charles Hicks at center

Hicks's first major accomplishment was the key role he played in 1865 to form Brooker and Clayton's Georgia Minstrels. He served as the manager and probably performed with them during a tour through the Northeastern United States in 1865-6. Hicks and company became the first black minstrel troupe to have a successful season.

Hicks left Brooker and Clayton's in 1866 to try his hand at owning and managing a company of his own, becoming the first black man to do both simultaneously. Over the next four years, Hicks started and disbanded a number of unsuccessful groups. He played up his black minstrels' connection to legitimate black culture with names like the Slave Troupe or the Georgia Slave Brothers, and evidence suggests that Hicks's companies did draw significant numbers of black viewers. In early 1869, a Pittsburgh newspaper reported that the "colored element of the city turned out en masse" to see Hicks's Georgia Slave Troupe. In 1870, Hicks and his partner Bob Height led Hicks and Height's Georgia Minstrels on tour in Germany, the first black minstrel troupe to perform in that country.

Hicks left mid-tour to star with Sam Hague's Slave Troupe of Georgia Minstrels. He also became a correspondent for the New York entertainment journal, The Clipper, a position he used to tout his accomplishments abroad. Upon their return to the United States in 1872, the troupe was bought by Charles Callender, and Hicks stayed on until 1873 as business manager. He next managed two more ill-fated troupes, Charles Hick's [sic] African Minstrels and Charles Hick's [sic] Georgia Minstrels. His next job was as manager of Sprague and Blodgett's Georgia Minstrels in 1876.

In 1877, Hicks lured a company away from promoter J. H. Haverly and Tom Maguire and called them Hick's [sic] Georgia Minstrels. Within a few months, Hicks led them to a tour in Australia. They played there for three years, during which Hicks wrote again for The Clipper. Hicks also perfected his flair for promotion in Australia. Ads raved, "PIRATES BEWARE! WE ARE STILL ON THE WAR PATH" and "THE HEROES OF MONTREAL, SARATOGA, CHICAGO, SAN FRANCISCO AND NOW AUSTRALIA STILL LIVE!" He advertised his return to U.S. soil in July 1880 with an ad that read, "MISSING MAN TURNS UP HOME AGAIN." Over the next few years, he managed and performed with a number of troupes owned by others.

In late 1881 or early 1882, Hicks persuaded Callender's current black troupe to join him in western New York. On Callender's orders, Gustave and Charles Frohman won them back, possibly by threatening to blacklist the wayward performers. Hicks's later stint as business manager for A. D. Sawyer and Tom McIntosh failed, possibly indicating that Hicks had himself been blacklisted.

In 1885, Hicks managed Billy Kersands's troupe but left after less than a year. He again formed his own company, this time with A. D. Sawyer. They bickered, and within a year, they were managing rival troupes, both under the name Hicks and Sawyer's Consolidated Colored Minstrels. Hicks's portion failed to make money, so he moved to playing dime shows, museums, and other lower-paying venues. Eventually, Hicks formed another troupe and took them to Australia, New Zealand, and other Pacific countries. He died in 1902 in Suraboya, Java.
