= Billy Kersands =

American comedian and dancer (c. 1842–1915)

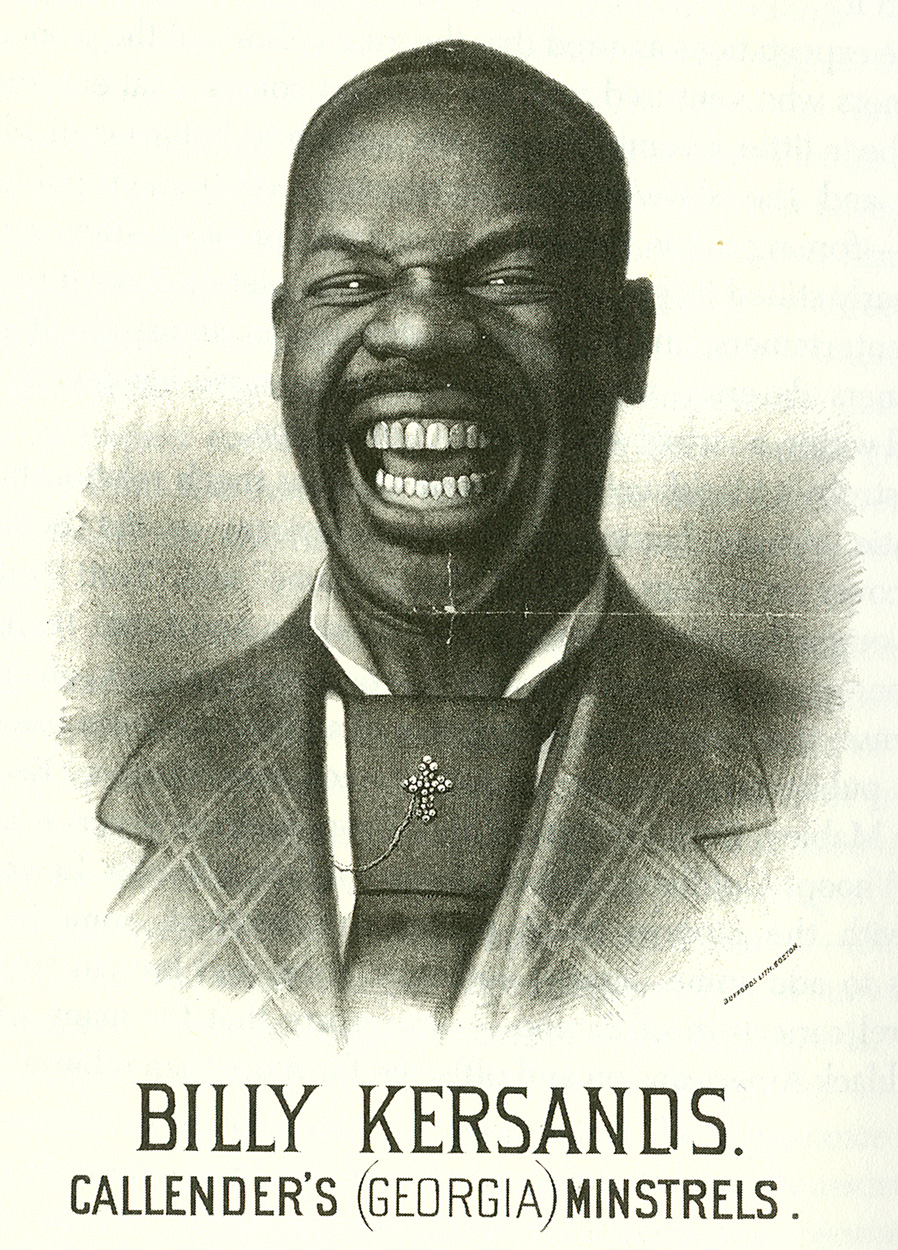
Billy Kersands from a poster for Callender's (Georgia) Minstrels, early 1870s

Billy Kersands (c. 1842 in Baton Rouge, Louisiana – June 30, 1915 in Artesia, New Mexico) was an African-American comedian and dancer. He was the most popular black comedian of his day, best known for his work in blackface minstrelsy. In addition to his skillful acrobatics, dancing, singing, and instrument playing, Kersands was renowned for his comic routines involving his large mouth, which he could contort comically or fill with objects such as billiard balls or saucers. His stage persona was that of the dim-witted black man of the type that had been popularized in white minstrel shows. Modern commentators such as Mel Watkins cite him as one of the earliest black entertainers to have faced the dilemma of striking a balance between social satire and the reinforcement of negative stereotypes.

== Career ==
Kersands began performing with traveling minstrel troupes in the early 1860s. As black minstrelsy gained popularity, Kersands became its biggest star. In 1879, he earned about $15 a week, but by 1882, he was reportedly earning $80, only slightly less than a featured white minstrel. He was known to have earned $250 a week during European Minstrel Tours. He was a hit with both white and black audiences, particularly in the Southern United States. Tom Fletcher wrote that "In the South, a minstrel show without Billy Kersands is like a circus without elephants."

Over his career, Kersands played with many of the major black minstrel troupes. He was a member of Sam Hague's Georgia Minstrels, along with Charles Hicks and Bob Height. When the company returned from an English tour in 1872, Charles Callender purchased the troupe and renamed it Callender's Georgia Minstrels. When Kersands and other popular troupe members demanded higher pay and more favorable treatment, Callender dismissed them. They quit to form their own ensemble, a move Callender characterized as theft. The company did poorly, and Kersands and most of the others returned to Callender. During his years with Callender's Georgia Minstrels, Kersands regularly featured in the military burlesques that regularly ended the first act beginning in 1875 or 1876. These sketches earned him renown for his acrobatic feats of drumming.

In 1885, Kersands began his own minstrel troupe, named Kersands' Minstrels. Charles Hicks was the manager, but he left to form his own group after little more than a year. Kersands' Minstrels was well known for its marching band, and the group led a Mardi Gras parade in 1886. Kersands offered $1000 to any rival who could outmarch them. He also continued to play engagements with other companies, including Richard and Pringle's Georgia Minstrels in 1890 as one of "The Vestibule Car Porters and Drum Majors". In 1902-1903 he organized a touring all-black cast minstrel show whose membership included a young Sydney Kirkpatrick.

In 1904, Kersands performed in an urban, black-produced show in the East. He only stayed for a short time, instead preferring the blackface minstrelsy he knew best. He formed another troupe and took up touring primarily in the South. Kersands answered the inevitable question of why he had not made the move to vaudeville thus: "All of my money came from the people of the South, the white and the colored, while playing down there. Whether they meant it or not, the way I was treated by them, and still am, I feel at home. I also make a good living with no worries."

== Performance ==
Kersands's comedy act centered on his enormous mouth, which he exuberantly contorted into countless shapes. He peppered his songs with these movements and their accompanying noises. One observer remarked, "The slightest curl of his lip or opening of that yawning chasm termed his mouth was of itself sufficient to convulse the audience." He could even fit several billiard balls or a cup and saucer into his mouth and still perform a dance routine or fill the theater with boisterous laughter. Tom Fletcher wrote that while touring in England, Kersands told Queen Victoria that if his mouth was any bigger, his ears would have to be moved.

This physical feature fit well into racist white-created stereotypes of blacks having large lips and mouths. Kersands further embraced such disparaging caricatures by affecting the stage persona of a slow and ignorant Sambo. He also sang songs that reinforced these racist views. In his "Mary's Gone with a Coon", he sang of a black man "lamenting" his daughter's impending marriage to a black man: "De chile dat I bore, should tink ob me no more / Den to run away wid a big black coon." His "Old Aunt Jemima" lent its name to the stereotyped mammy Aunt Jemima that later was developed into an iconic trademark for a brand of pancakes.

Despite Kersands's reinforcement of negative black stereotypes, very few African Americans disdained his act. Part of his appeal for them lay in his mixing of elements of African American folklore into his show in a way that would appeal to his black audience but be ignored or derided by whites. "Old Aunt Jemima", one of his signature songs, serves as a good example. The song exists in three texts, two published 1875 and one in 1880, suggesting that Kersands made up verses as he sang. All three versions begin in a church, a locale that white minstrels tended to avoid. The 1875 texts describe charismatic black worship practices, but the 1880 edition begins with a black character fleeing a white church because they "prayed so long". Verses from the song soon entered the African American tradition and appeared in later collections of folklore. Other songs Kersands performed featured African American elements like talking animals and weak-versus-strong match-ups. His popularity led many theatre owners to relax rules limiting black patrons to specific sections of the playhouse.

Despite weighing over 200 pounds, Kersands was also a talented dancer and acrobat. His trademark dance was Essence of Old Virginia or Virginia Essence, which he may have introduced. The dance later developed into the soft shoe. He was also known for the buck-and-wing. His dance routines helped cement such dance acts as fixtures in later vaudeville and Hollywood routines.

== Death ==
Kersands died shortly after a performance in Artesia, New Mexico at the age of 73.

== Songs ==
- "Old Aunt Jemima"
