= Barbasol =

American shaving brand

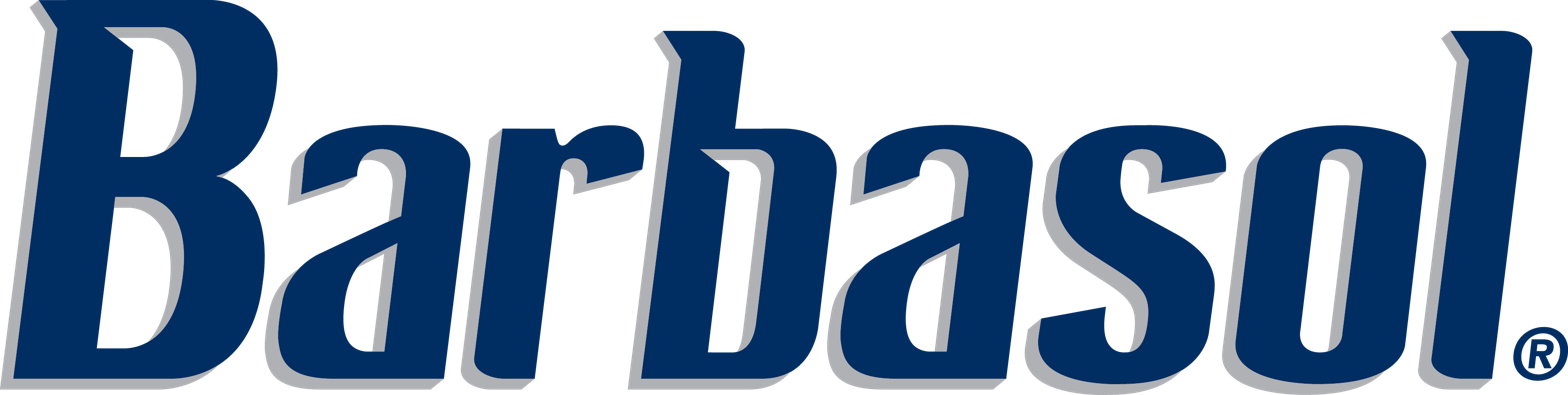
- Type: Shaving cream
- Manufacturer: Barbasol LLC
- Origin: United States
- Introduced: 1919; 107 years ago
- Variants: Original, Soothing Aloe, Sensitive Skin, Arctic Chill, Pacific Rush, Mountain Blast, Skin Conditioner and Therapeutic
- Website: barbasol.com

Barbasol is an American brand of shaving cream, aftershave, and disposable razors created by MIT Professor Frank Shields in 1919 in Indianapolis. It is currently owned by Perio, Inc.

== Invention ==
MIT Professor Frank Shields set out to create a product that would provide for a less irritating shave. In 1919, he succeeded with the invention of Barbasol – a shaving cream that did not have to be worked into a lather. The original formula was a thick lotion that was still manufactured until 2019 when Barbasol 1919 Classic Shaving Cream replaced it.

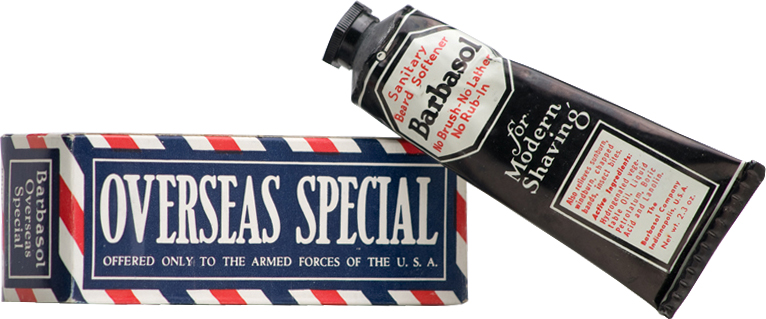
Overseas Special for members of the Military supplied by Barbasol

== Brand history ==
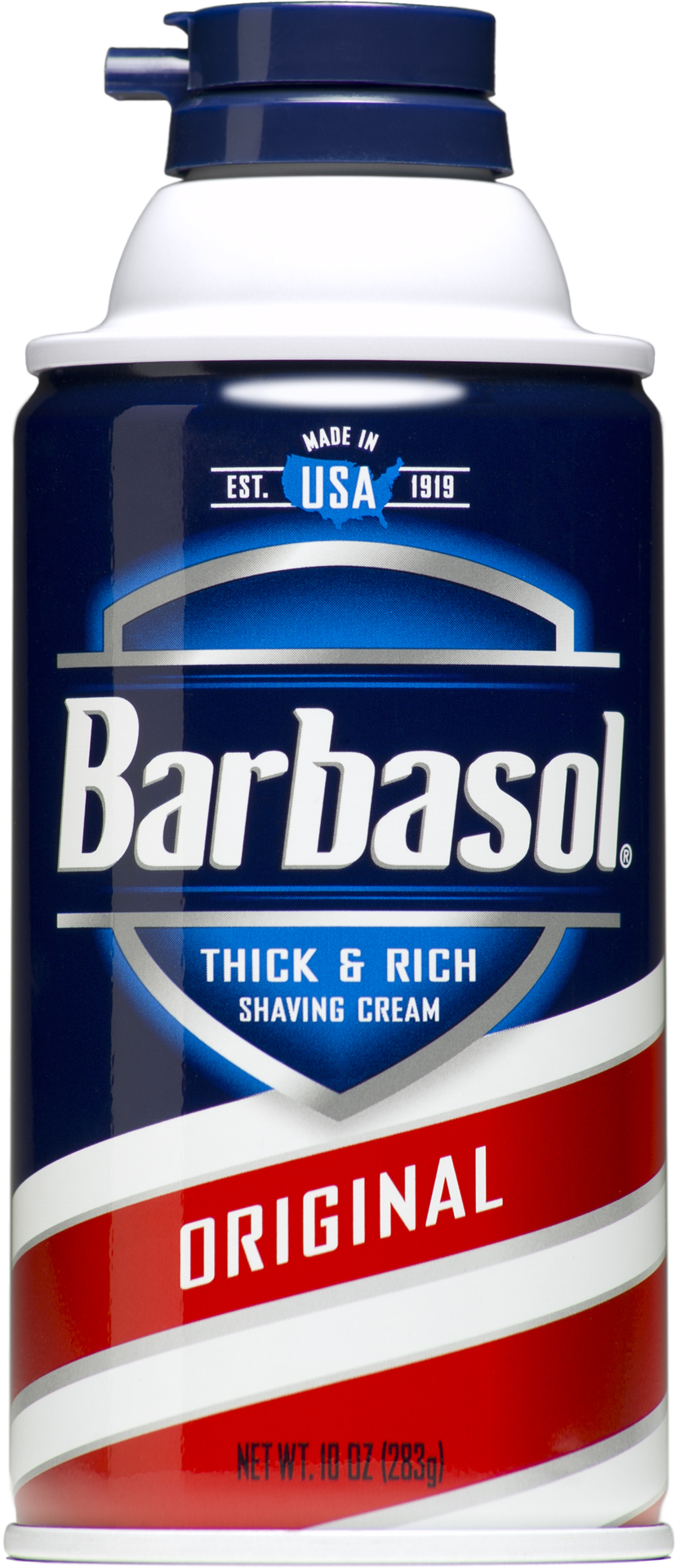
Photo of new Barbasol can design

=== Napco Corporation ===
Barbasol was first manufactured under the Napco Corporation name, a company Frank Shields started before inventing Barbasol. After the shaving cream sales increased, they outgrew Napco, and The Barbasol Company was created.

=== The Barbasol Company ===
Frank Shields established The Barbasol Company in 1920, which owned the brand for 42 years. In the mid-1950s, design engineer Robert P. Kaplan of Rochester, NY invented and patented the first aerosol shaving cream can, and the Barbasol Company changed the formula from the thick cream in a tube to the soft, fluffy foam familiar in the aerosol cans today. The can design mimicked a barber's pole, and is still the trademark design used today.

=== Pfizer ===
In 1962, Pfizer bought The Barbasol Company and brought Barbasol into the portfolio. During this time, they developed many additional versions of Barbasol to complement the original formulation, including Soothing Aloe, Skin Conditioner, Sensitive Skin, Extra Protection, Cool Menthol and Lemon Lime.

As gels became popular, Pfizer created gel versions of Barbasol in the Original, Soothing Aloe, Sensitive Skin, and Extra Protection varieties.

In the 1980s, Pfizer made Barbasol Glide Stick, a deodorant.

By the 1990s, Barbasol brand equity had diminished. Sales had slowed. Pfizer, primarily a pharmaceutical company, looked to sell the brand.

=== Perio, Inc. ===
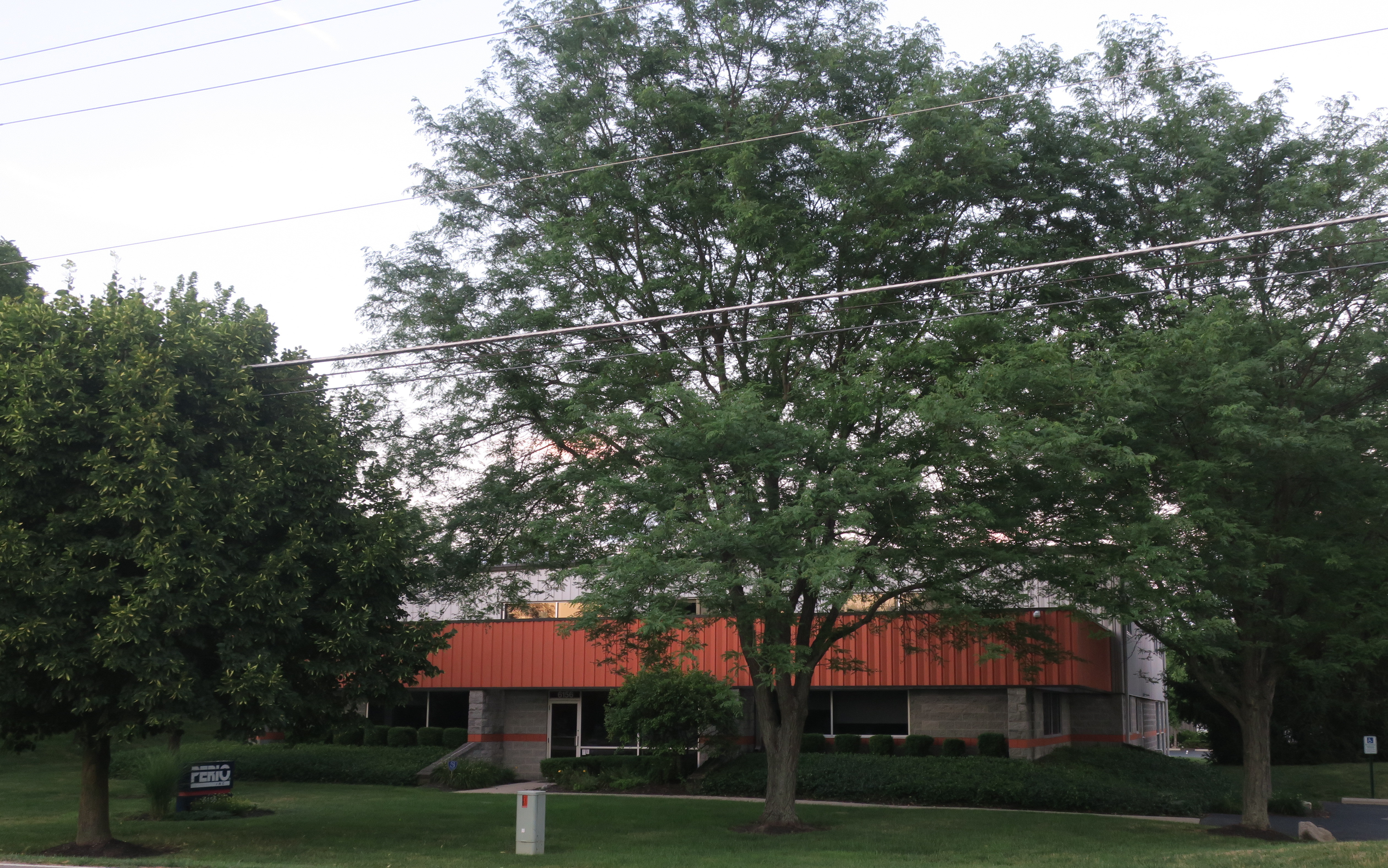
Perio, Inc. headquarters in Dublin, Ohio

Perio, Inc., based in Dublin, Ohio, bought the Barbasol brand from Pfizer in 2001, and has sought to revitalize it. They consolidated the Barbasol line to Original, Soothing Aloe, and Skin Conditioner, and added Pacific Rush.

A non-aerosol cream that simulated the original product was created in 2003, but it was reformulated to the Barbasol Non-Aerosol Therapeutic Shave Cream in 2006 (Pfizer also had a similar simulation of the original Barbasol cream, but discontinued it in 1999). This was discontinued in 2019 and replaced by the 1919 Classic Shaving Cream for the brand's 100th anniversary.

Later, Barbasol released Sensitive Skin, Mountain Blast (a new fragrance), and Arctic Chill (menthol) to its line of shaving creams. Several aftershave products have been introduced under the Barbasol brand name. Still later, Barbasol introduced disposable razors in twin-blade, three-blade, and six-blade versions.

== Advertising ==
=== Early advertising ===
Barbasol became a very popular shaving cream after its introduction. Throughout the 1920s and 1930s, many print advertisements were used to support its growth. Many of the print ads featured men and women in situations that would be considered risqué for their time.

The company also used several famous spokesmen in their print ads through the years, including actors Douglas Fairbanks Jr. and Joe Cook, musician Vincent Lopez, baseball players Babe Ruth and Rogers Hornsby, as well as football legend Knute Rockne.

In 1938, Barbasol sponsored a car in the Indianapolis 500, and painted it to look like a tube of the cream. Driven by George Bailey, the car made it to lap 166 of 200 before suffering clutch problems. The following year, the Barbasol car finished in tenth place. The team got involved as a sponsor in the NASCAR Busch Series in the late 1990s, sponsoring Dick Bown's team and drivers Chuck and Jim Bown, Jim Sauter, and Greg Biffle in eleven races in 1996, then going to Akins Motorsports and drivers Glenn Allen Jr. and Elton Sawyer starting in 1997.

The tagline throughout this time was "No brush, no lather, no rub in."

=== Singin' Sam, the Barbasol Man ===
One of the most nostalgic figures in Barbasol's history was Singin' Sam the Barbasol Man, whose real name was Harry Frankel.

Frankel got his start as a vaudevillian, and eventually became the spokesperson for a lawnmower company and began broadcasting out of Cincinnati. The Barbasol Company soon heard him and, in 1931, signed him on as Singin' Sam the Barbasol Man, where he made famous the Barbasol jingle, "Barbasol, Barbasol ... No brush, no lather, no rub-in ... Wet your razor, then begin."

=== Advertising since 2001 ===
Barbasol's advertising since 2001 is not as suggestive as its 1920s counterparts. Many television ads from 2001 to 2009 have featured a close-call situation, followed by one person saying "Close shave!" and another person responding with "Better buy Barbasol!" The "close shave" double entendre has been replaced with the more patriotic tagline "Close Shave America, Close Shave Barbasol." (This can be heard, for example, on the Fred Thompson Show radio podcast). The related advertising relies less on tongue-in-cheek humor and associates the brand more with a warm, homey feeling.

In February 2012, Barbasol signed a five-year agreement with Major League Soccer side Columbus Crew that would see the brand become the club's shirt sponsor.

Barbasol is a main sponsor of radio network Westwood One, with its radio commercials (most of which featured former NFL quarterback Boomer Esiason, who was an analyst for the network) being heard during sporting events broadcast on Westwood One.

The Barbasol Championship is a professional golf tournament scheduled that was played for the first time on the PGA Tour in 2015 as an alternative event for the 2015 Open Championship. The tournament is played on the Grand National course of the Robert Trent Jones Golf Trail in Opelika, Alabama.

Barbasol has created a social media presence, including a Twitter-based sweepstakes.

== Legacy ==
Barbasol's longevity in the American marketplace has made it an unmistakable icon for shaving. It is often the representative for a can of shaving cream, simply for its recognizable packaging, and can be seen in such movies as Jurassic Park, Dead Men Don't Wear Plaid, and Evan Almighty. In the 1993 science-fiction film Jurassic Park, an embryo cryopreservation container is hidden in a modified Barbasol can. The brand was used to market the 2015 sequel Jurassic World. Special dinosaur-themed cans were released, along with a promotion offering a trip to an archaeological excavation in Wyoming.

The image on the cover for the Dead Kennedys album Give Me Convenience or Give Me Death is a composite of a 1950s Barbasol shaving cream ad and a 1946 famine in Calcutta.

== North American distribution ==
Barbasol is distributed throughout North America.

Country	Distributor
Canada	Today's Concepts
Mexico	Global Tradings, S.A. de C.V.
USA	Perio, Inc. (owner)
