= Cemetery of the Evergreens =

Historic cemetery in New York City

- The Evergreens Cemetery
- U.S. National Register of Historic Places
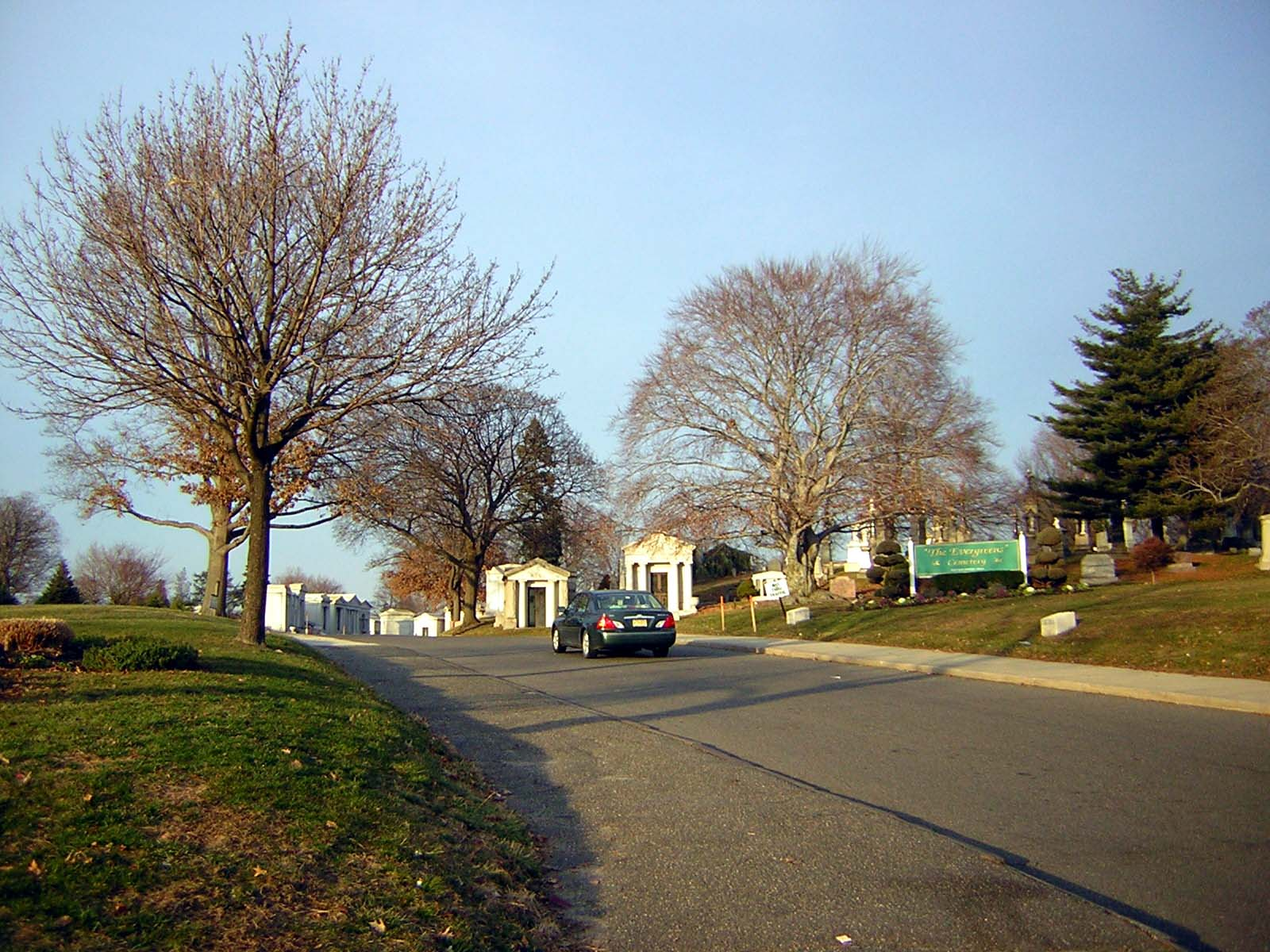
- Southern (Bushwick Avenue) entrance

- Location within New York City Location within New York Location within the United States
- Location: 1629 Bushwick Ave., Brooklyn, New York
- Coordinates: 40°41′2.0″N 73°54′4.3″W
- Area: 225 acres (91 ha)
- Built: 1849
- Architect: Vaux, Calvert; etc
- NRHP reference No.: 07001192
- Added to NRHP: November 15, 2007

The Cemetery of the Evergreens, also called The Evergreens Cemetery, is a non-denominational rural cemetery along the Cemetery Belt in Brooklyn and Queens, New York City. It was incorporated in 1849, not long after the passage of New York's Rural Cemetery Act spurred development of cemeteries outside Manhattan. For a time, it was the busiest cemetery in New York City; in 1929 there were 4,673 interments. Today, the Evergreens is the final resting place of more than 526,000 people.

The cemetery borders Brooklyn and Queens and covers 225 acres (0.91 km^{2}) of rolling hills and gently sloping meadows. It features several thousand trees and flowering shrubs in a park-like setting. Cypress Hills Cemetery lies to its northeast. The Most Holy Trinity Cemetery (established in 1851), which is known for having metal headstones, borders the cemetery on the northwest in the Bushwick neighborhood of Brooklyn.

== History ==
The Evergreens was built on the principle of the rural cemetery. Two of the era's most noted landscape architects, Andrew Jackson Downing and Alexander Jackson Davis, were instrumental in the layout of the cemetery grounds.

The Evergreens has a monument to six victims of the Triangle Shirtwaist Factory fire of March 25, 1911 who were unidentified for nearly a century. In 2011, Michael Hirsch, a historian, completed four years of research that identified these victims by name (see § Group monument).

There are also seventeen British Commonwealth service personnel buried in the cemetery: thirteen from World War I and four from World War II.

The cemetery was listed on the National Register of Historic Places on November 15, 2007. In 2025, cemetery officials announced plans to spend $20 million on a stargazing observatory, since amateur astronomers frequently met there.

== Notable burials ==
=== Individual graves ===
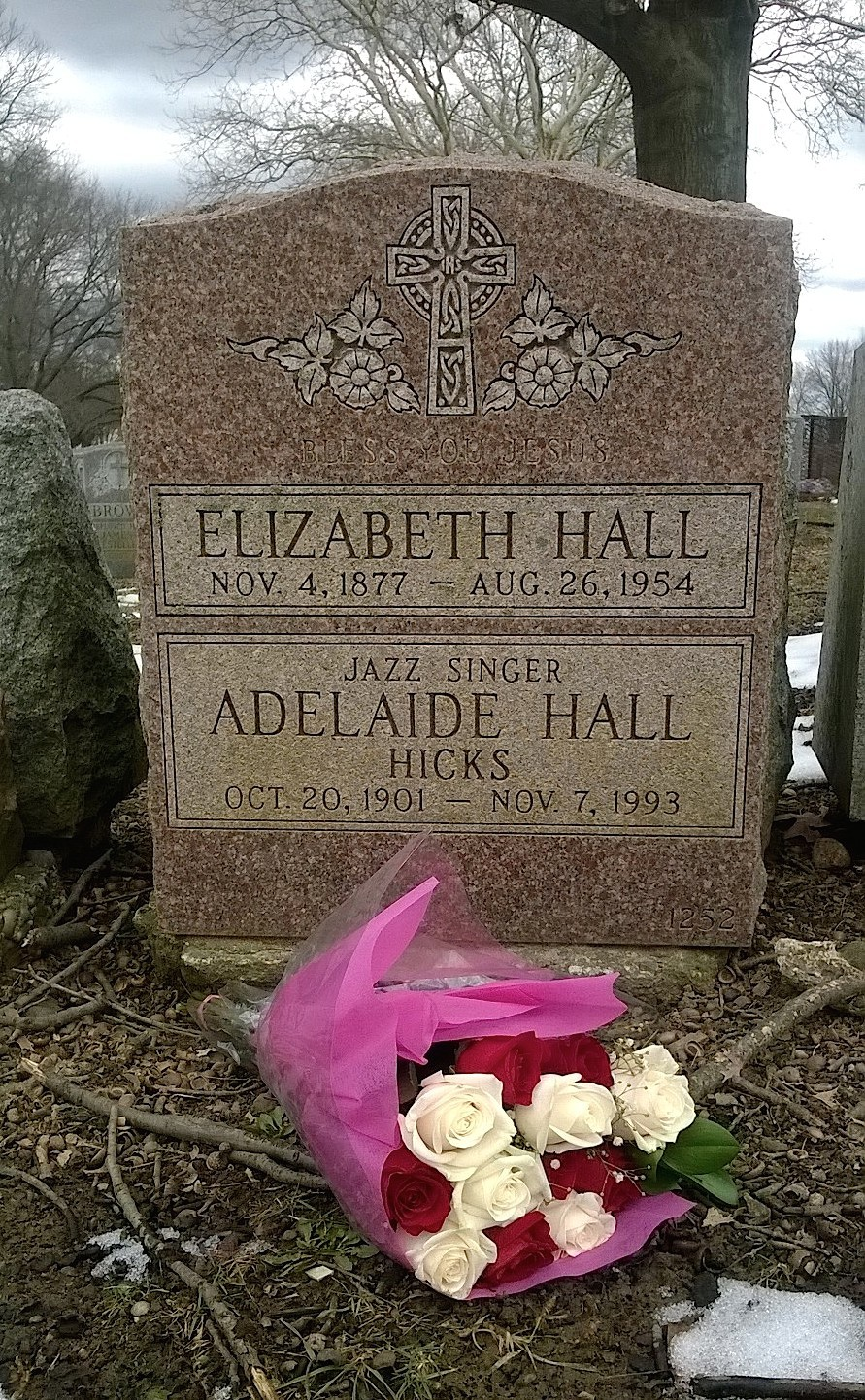
Adelaide Hall's grave at Cemetery of the Evergreens

- John Bunny (1863–1915), actor
- George C. Bennett (1824–1885), newspaper publisher and New York State assemblyman
- Albert Levi Burt (1843–1913), eponymous founder of the publisher A. L. Burt
- Anthony Comstock (1844–1915), censor (see Comstock Law)
- William C. Cooper (1853–1918), silent-film actor
- Edward Copland (1793–1859), mayor of Brooklyn
- Bill Dahlen (1870–1950), Major League Baseball player, one of the outstanding early 20th century players. Lies in an unmarked grave
- James E. Davis (1962–2003), New York City councilman (he was originally interred in Green-Wood Cemetery, but after it was realized that his assassin was also interred there, he was moved to the Cemetery of the Evergreens)
- Thomas Dilward (1817–1887), Minstrel performer credited with having invented the word "hunky-dory"
- George Henry Ellis (1875–1898), A chief yeoman on the USS Brooklyn
- Alice Fleming (1882–1952), actress, stage and screen
- Effie Germon (1845–1914), Stage actress descended from the Germons of Baltimore, an old theatrical family
- Adelaide Hall (1901–1993), singer, actress, dancer, nightclub chanteuse
- George Hall (1849–1923), Major League Baseball player, banned from baseball for life
- Yusef Hawkins (1973–1989), murder victim
- Martin Johnson Heade (1819–1904), artist
- Lucille Hegamin (1894–1970), singer, female pioneer of the Blues
- Nelson H. Henry (1855–1923), member of the New York State Assembly, Adjutant General of New York
- William Hickey (1927–1997), actor
- Martin Hildebrandt (1825–1890), early tattoo artist
- Fanny Janauschek (1829–1904), Czech-born stage actress
- Ernest A. Janson (1878–1930) highly decorated United States Marine, earned two Medals of Honor for his heroic actions in World War I
- Joseph Forsyth Johnson (1840–1906), landscape architect and great-grandfather of Bruce Forsyth
- George H. Lindsay (1837–1916), congressman
  - George W. Lindsay (1865–1938), congressman, his son
- Winsor McCay (1872–1934), cartoonist and animated cartoon pioneer
- Antonio "Tony" Pastor (1837–1908), vaudevillian
- Charles A. Read (1837–1865), American Civil War Medal of Honor recipient
- Bill "Bojangles" Robinson (1878–1949), tap dancer
- Stephen A. Rudd (1874–1936), congressman
- Assotto Saint (1947–1994), poet, publisher and performance artist
- Joseph Thuma Schenck (c. 1891–1930), vaudevillian, better known as "Joe" Schenck, of the comedy singing team Van and Schenck
- Gardiner Spring (1785–1873), American minister and author
- William Steinitz (1836–1900), world chess champion
- Bob Thiele (1922–1996), record producer
- Amy Vanderbilt (1908–1974), journalist, etiquette authority
- Oscar Walker (1854–1889), Major League Baseball player
- John William Warde (c. 1912–1938), his widely publicized suicide inspired the movie Fourteen Hours.
- Horace Weston (1825–1890), banjo player
- Thomas "Blind Tom" Wiggins (1849–1908), musician
- Lester Young (1909–1959), jazz musician

=== Group monument ===
- Triangle Shirtwaist fire – the bodies of six victims of the 1911 fire to be identified were buried under a monument of a kneeling woman. They could not be identified after the inferno because they were burned beyond recognition, and had been buried without names. A century after the tragedy, in 2011, they were identified by historian Michael Hirsch as Maria Giuseppa Lauletti, Max Florin, Concetta Prestifilippo, Josephine Cammarata, Dora Evans, and Fannie Rosen.

== See also ==
- List of United States cemeteries
