= Lew Johnson =

American minstrel show manager

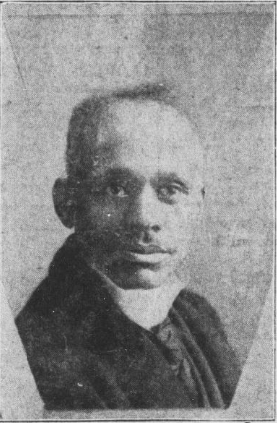
Lew Johnson

Lew Johnson (c. 1840–1910) was an African-American owner and business manager of blackface minstrel troupes composed of African-American performers. His career began in the mid-1860s and spanned 25 years. Johnson is the only black minstrel-troupe owner to have enjoyed any consistent success (others, such as Charles Hicks, were constantly fluctuating between success to failure). This was due to his keeping well away from the lucrative markets dominated by white owners. He primarily toured in the Midwestern and Western United States, playing countless one-nighters in rural settlements. The people in these areas could be racist (perhaps more than in the East), which made the itinerant lifestyle a hard one for Johnson and his minstrels. Johnson made a brief venture into the Eastern market in 1886, but his troupe fared poorly and fled back west.

Johnson's troupes had between six and twenty members, with an average of twelve. None became famous (though they were popular where they played). This allowed him to change their names to keep up with trends. Troupes he owned and managed include:

- Lew Johnson's Minstrels (1866)
- Lew Johnson's Plantation Minstrels (1870)
- The Plantation Minstrel Slave Troupe (1875)
- Bishop's Female Georgia Minstrels (1879, as manager)
- Lew Johnson's Original Tennessee Jubilee Singers (1881)
- Lew Johnson and William Smallwood's Colored Combination (1881)
- The Black Baby Boy Minstrels (1886)
- The Refined Colored Minstrels and Electric Brass Band (1890)
