= Charles A. Read =

Union Navy sailor in the American Civil War

- Civil War era Navy Medal of Honor
- Born: October 23, 1837; Sweden
- Died: May 7, 1865 (aged 27); New York City, US
- Burial place: Cemetery of the Evergreens
- Military career
- Allegiance: United States; Union
- Branch: United States Navy; Union Navy
- Rank: Coxswain
- Unit: (United States Navy) USS Kearsarge
- Conflicts: American Civil War: Battle of Cherbourg (1864)
- Awards: Medal of Honor

Charles A. Read (born Johan A. Linderoth, October 23, 1837 – May 7, 1865) was a Union Navy sailor in the United States Navy who received the Medal of Honor for valor in action during the American Civil War.

== Military service ==
Read was born in Sweden in 1837. On June 19, 1864, he was serving as a Coxswain on the sloop of war USS Kearsarge when she sank the commerce raider CSS Alabama off Cherbourg, France. He was awarded his Medal of Honor for gallantry under fire exhibited while crewing the ship's pivot gun.

== Medal of Honor citation ==
Rank and organization: Coxswain, U.S. Navy. Born: 1837, Sweden Accredited to: Ohio. G.O. No.: 45, December 31, 1864.

Read's official Medal of Honor citation reads:

Served as coxswain on board the U.S.S. Kearsarge when she destroyed the Alabama off Cherbourg, France, June 19, 1864. Acting as the first sponger of the pivot gun during this bitter engagement, Read exhibited marked coolness and good conduct and was highly recommended for his gallantry under fire by his divisional officer.

== Death and burial ==
Medal of Honor recipient Charles A. Read died on May 7, 1865, of an apparent suicide and was buried in the Cemetery of the Evergreens, Brooklyn, New York City, New York.

Read's death notice in the May 9, 1865, New York Herald newspaper read:

Suicide By Taking Poison - At a late hour on Sunday night officer Tucker, of the Fourteenth precinct, was called to the house No. 98 Mott street to take charge of Mr. Charles Reed, who, he was informed, had swallowed a dose of laudanum while suffering from temporary derangement of mind, for the purpose of terminating his existence. Mr. Reed, being in a state of insensibility at the time, was conveyed to the New York Hospital, where he soon afterwards died. Deceased was about thirty years of age and a native of Sweden. He had been following the sea for a living. Coroner Wildey was notified to hold an inquest.

== See also ==
- List of American Civil War Medal of Honor recipients: Q–S
