= Cornelius J. O'Brien =

Vaudeville performer

Cornelius J. O'Brien (1869 - January 14, 1954) was known professionally as Neil O'Brien. He was a vaudeville performer and a minstrel show performer. He worked with Lew Dockstader.

== Biography ==
He was born in 1869 in Port Dickinson, New York. He joined a minstrel show and later appeared with Lew Dockstader for a few years. He next performed in vaudeville then he started the Neil O'Brien Minstrel Company in 1913. He toured from 1913 to 1925. He next teamed up with James J. Corbett, the boxer to tour as a vaudeville comedy act. He retired in 1929.

He died on January 14, 1954, at Mount Vernon Hospital in Mount Vernon, New York, at age 85.
