= Haverly's United Mastodon Minstrels =

American blackface minstrel troupe

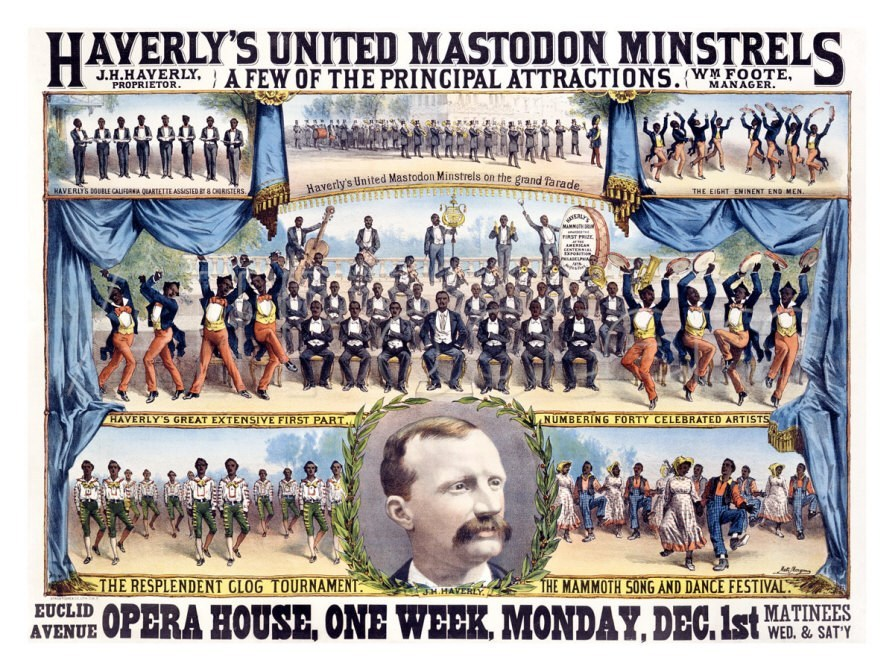
Poster featuring Haverly and his United Mastodon Minstrels

Haverly's United Mastodon Minstrels was a blackface minstrel troupe created in 1877, when J. H. Haverly merged four of the companies he owned and managed.

== Promotion ==
Borrowing techniques from showmen like P. T. Barnum, Haverly advertised the Mastodons in broadsides, newspapers, and playbills: "FORTY—COUNT 'EM—40—FORTY—HAVERLY'S UNITED MASTODON MINSTRELS". Another ad read, "Forty is a magical and historical number. In the time of Noah it rained forty days and forty nights. The Children of Israel wandered forty years in the wilderness. Haverly's famous forty are just as important."

== Showmanship ==
The Mastodons entered every new town in two columns, spread out as far as possible and led by a brass band. Beginning in 1878, a drum corps joined their ranks so that they could tour one part of a city while the band played in another. After sufficient marching, the two units joined up and led intrigued spectators into the theater. The company's manager, Charles Frohman, showed off a three-foot-tall iron safe when the troupe arranged for accommodations, with a golden "Haverly's Mastodon Minstrels" blazoned on its side; only the troupe knew that the safe rarely held anything of value.

The United Mastodon Minstrels and the aura that surrounded them were all about size. In one 1879 production in Chicago, the curtain raised to reveal 19 minstrels. Behind them was another curtain, this one featuring a female figure representing "Dance". This went up and added another group of men, these standing in front of the figure of "Music". As this curtain lifted, the audience saw yet more men backed by the figure of "Art". This in turn rose, to complete the ensemble. The final backdrop was an image of two of Haverly's theaters.

In addition to size, the Mastodons' shows emphasized lavish scenery and extravagant expense. The program for an 1880 show addressed the audience: "The attention of the public is respectfully called to the magnificent scene representing a Turkish Barbaric Palace in Silver and Gold." The sketch began with minstrels portraying Turkish soldiers on a mountain. The scenery then changed to a royal palace, the scene of a dancing contest. For the finale, a number of unrelated scenes appeared, representing "Base-Ball", "The Dying Athlete", "The Strong Defending the Weak", and "United We Stand". The third act consisted of a circus burlesque, called "PEA-TEA-BAR-NONE'S KOLLOSAL CIRKUSS, MUSEUM, MENAGERIE AND KAYNE'S KICKADROME KAVALKADE". The segment featured acrobats, bareback riders, clowns, tightrope walkers, and minstrels in elephant costumes.

== Success ==
Haverly's United Mastodon Minstrels saw great success, and the impact on minstrelsy was profound. Other troupe owners rushed to compete, mimicking the Mastodons' elaborate sets and large number of players. Ultimately, many smaller companies folded or were forced to travel further from the established minstrel circuits in order to survive.
