= Lew Dockstader =

American singer, comedian, and vaudeville entertainer (1856-1924)

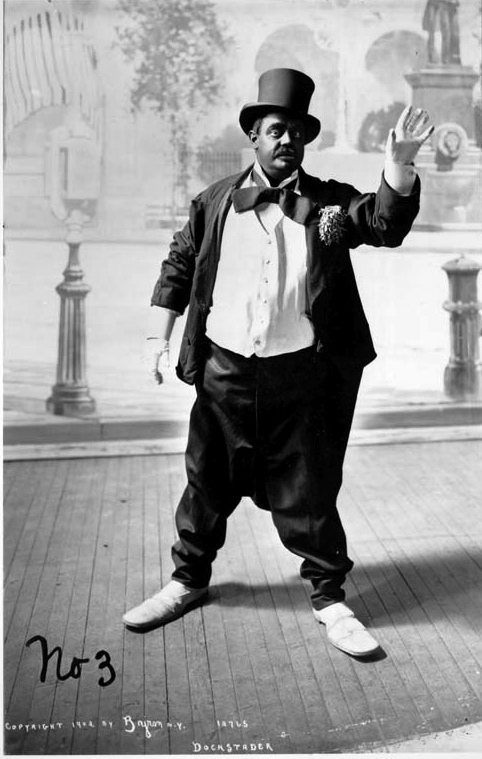
- Dockstader in blackface, 1902
- Born: George Alfred Clapp; August 7, 1856; Hartford, Connecticut, U.S.
- Died: October 26, 1924 (aged 68); New York City, U.S.

Lew Dockstader (born George Alfred Clapp; August 7, 1856 – October 26, 1924) was an American singer, comedian, and vaudeville star, best known as a blackface minstrel show performer. Dockstader performed as a solo act and in his own popular minstrel troupe.

== Biography ==
He was born George Alfred Clapp on August 7, 1856, in Hartford, Connecticut, to Chester Clapp and Sarah Reed. He married Lucin Brown on December 20, 1883, in Hartford and had a daughter, Mildred Havlin Clapp, who married Warren Palmer. He legally changed his name to Lew Dockstader on April 20, 1887.

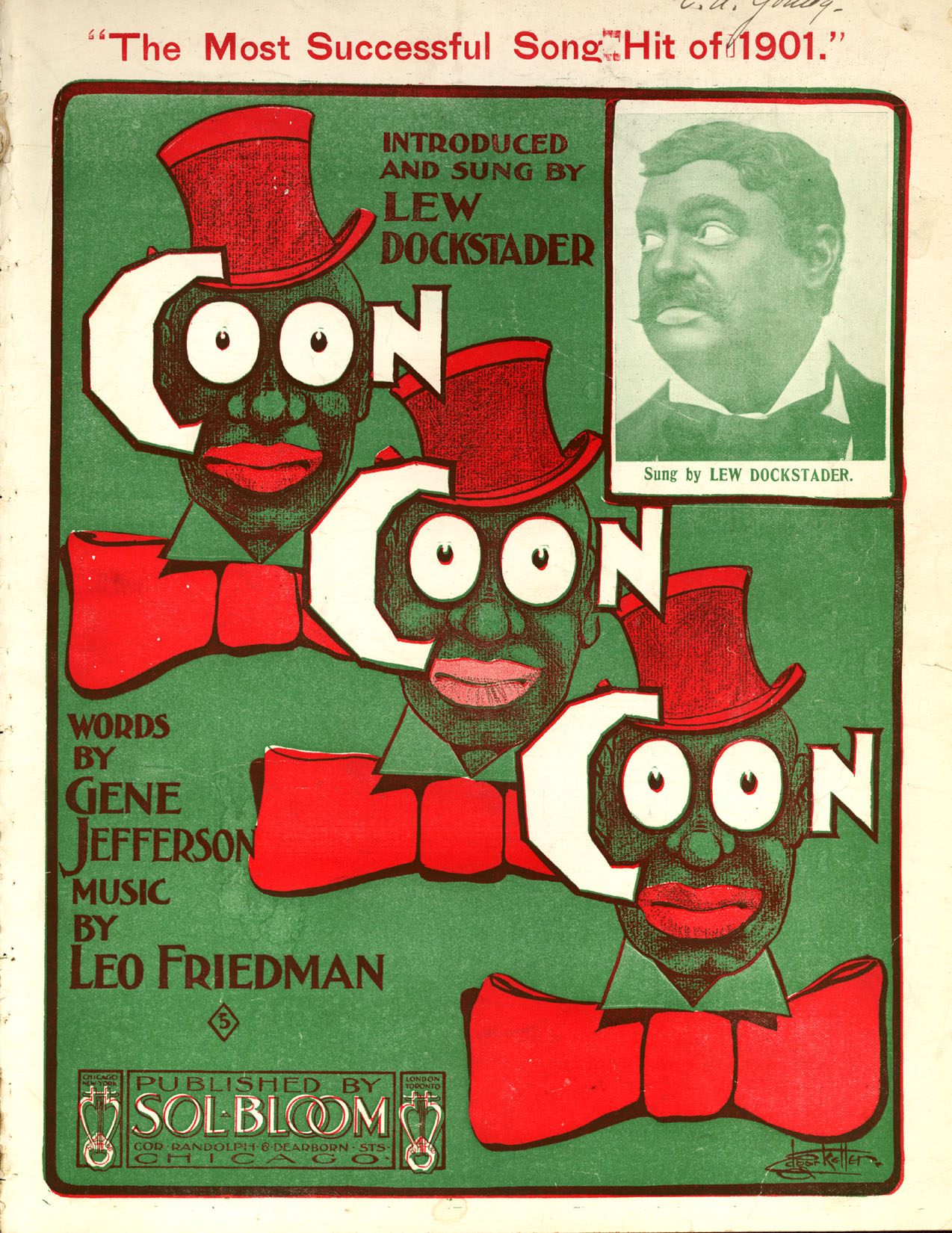
Songsheet cover for "Coon, Coon, Coon" from 1901 with photograph of Lew Dockstader in blackface inset

In 1898 he teamed up with George Primrose to form Primrose and Dockstader's Minstrel Men, which toured the vaudeville circuit till 1904. He appeared on film in a number of comedy shorts from 1904 to 1907.

On May 20, 1904 Dockstader was detained by the New York City Police Department for attempting to distribute a film "intended to caricature President Theodore Roosevelt and the office you hold." The film was "in the possession of the Edison Kinetoscope people and, if they had not been taken in hand at once, would undoubtedly have had a wide circulation through the various agencies and mechanism of that large organization." Dockstader agreed to surrender the film to the New York City Police in exchange for the charges against him being dropped.

Unfazed by his detention in 1904, in 1906 Dockstader began impersonating Theodore Roosevelt as part of his vaudeville show. He said Roosevelt had personally given him permission to do the impression.

Three years later, while Roosevelt was in British East Africa as part of the Smithsonian–Roosevelt African Expedition Dockstader commissioned a writer to prepare a sketch entitled "Dockstader in Africa, or Rescuing Roosevelt." He failed to pay the writer and was sued for non-payment. The sketch was never performed.

He played the title role in the 1914 feature silent film Dan.

His wife died in 1920. In January 1923 he was injured in a fall in New Brunswick, New Jersey, from his nascent cancer. His last performance was at Keith's Star Theater in December 1923. He died on October 26, 1924, in New York City of bone cancer on his left leg, at age 68. His funeral was at All Angels' Church and he was buried in Kensico Cemetery.

== Performers with Dockstader's Minstrels ==
- Will Oakland
- Al Jolson
- Cornelius J. O'Brien
