= Gustave Frohman =

American film producer (d. 1930)

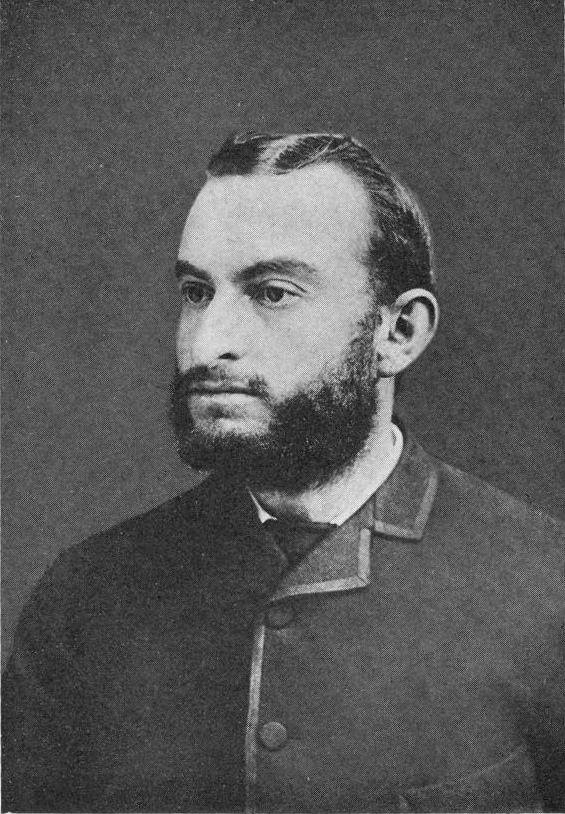
- Born: c. 1854; Sandusky, Ohio, US
- Died: August 16, 1930 (aged 76); New York City, US
- Occupation: Theatre producer
- Spouse: Marie Hubert
- Children: 3, including Philip Hubert Frohman
- Family: Charles Frohman (brother); Daniel Frohman (brother); Philip Gengembre Hubert (father-in-law)

Gustave Frohman (c. 1854 – August 16, 1930) was a theatre producer and advance man. He was one of three Frohman brothers who entered show business and he worked for most of his career alongside his brother, Charles Frohman. These two financed a number of theatre productions, often featuring African American actors. For instance, in 1878, they starred Sam Lucas in the first serious stage production of Uncle Tom's Cabin with a black man in the lead role.

== Biography ==
Frohman was born to a Jewish family in Sandusky, Ohio. He saw his greatest success in blackface minstrelsy. In 1881, he and his brother bought Callender's Consolidated Colored Minstrels, a small African-American troupe, from Charles Callender. They kept the valuable Callender's name but focused on ornamenting their sets and costumes; the troupe eventually became the most lavishly produced black troupe in the world. Their success was so great that by 1882 the Frohmans were able to buy J. H. Haverly's Genuine Colored Minstrels and merge it with theirs. The new troupe's size was so big and the Frohmans' grasp on the market so tight that Gustave and Charles Frohman split the troupe into three so as to allow them to tour more widely.

In 1915, the three Frohman brothers created The Frohman Amusement Corp. as a motion picture production company but Charles died a few months later in the sinking of the RMS Lusitania. Gustave and Daniel assumed control of the theatre operations plus ran the film production company until 1920.

== Personal life ==
Frohman was married to a former actress, Marie Hubert (1858-1939) a daughter of architect Philip Gengembre Hubert and Cornelia Doisy. Gustave and Marie had at least three children, Gustave Jr. who died at three; Philip Hubert Frohman, an architect who designed the Washington National Cathedral; and Louis Henry Frohman. He died in New York City in 1930.
