= Thomas Dilward =

American actor and singer (c.1817–1887)

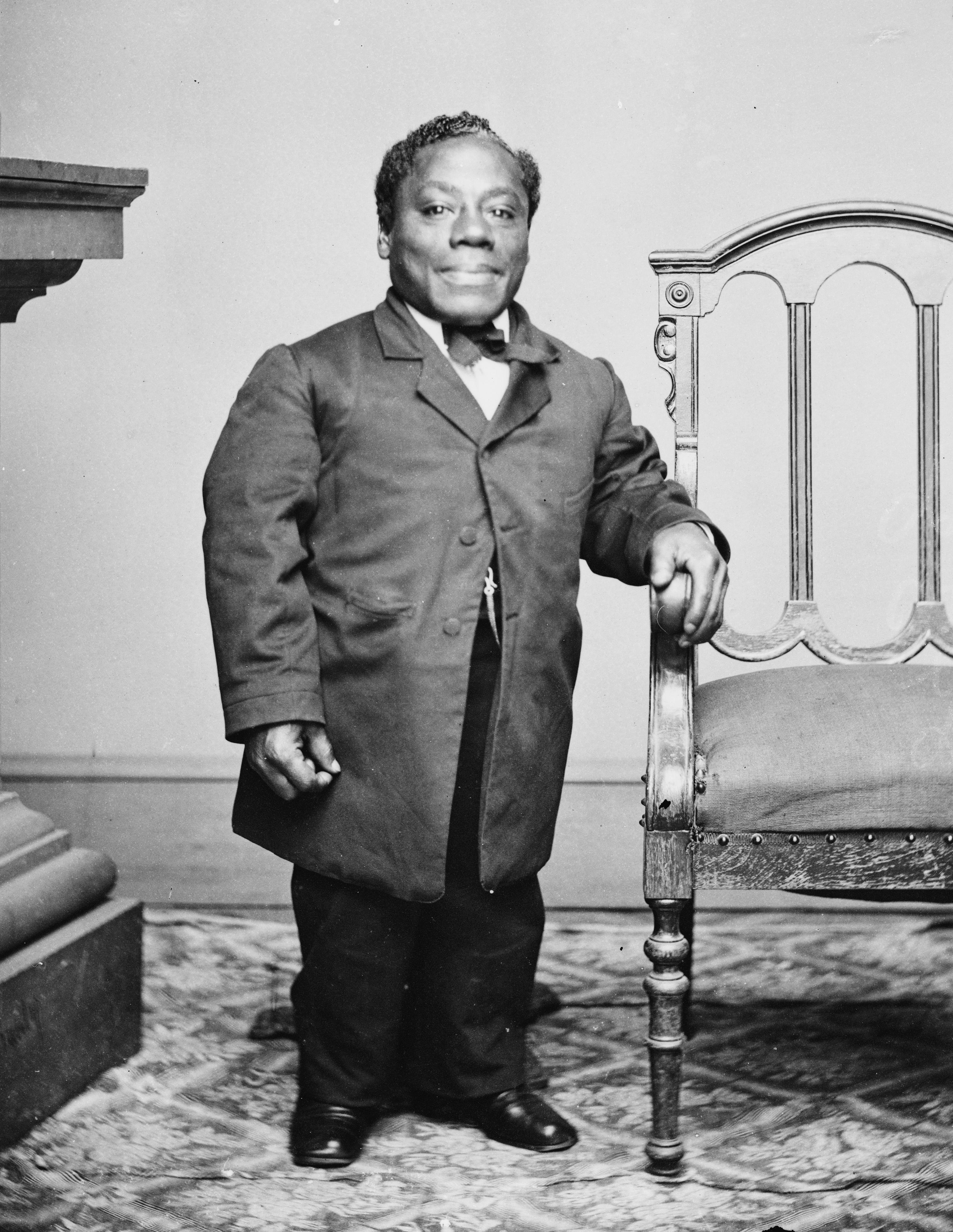
- Dilward c. 1860
- Born: Thomas Dilverd c. 1817; Brooklyn, New York, US
- Died: July 9, 1887 (aged 70)
- Resting place: Cemetery of the Evergreens
- Other names: Thomas Dilverd, Thomas Durand
- Occupation: Entertainer

Thomas Dilward (c. 1817 – July 9, 1887) was an entertainer who appeared in blackface minstrel shows from 1853 until the early 1880s under the name Japanese Tommy. He was also sometimes billed as "The African 'Tom Thumb'" and the "African Dwarf Tommy". Dilward is one of only two known African-Americans to have performed with white minstrel companies before the American Civil War (the other being William Henry Lane).

Dilward's size, between 23 and 36 in (58–91 cm) in height, made him a "curious attraction" and allowed him to take to the stage with white entertainers at a time when almost no black men did; in addition, his stage name may have been intended to hide his ethnic background. He was famous for his skills at singing, dancing, and playing the violin. He has also been credited in John Russell Bartlett's 1877 Dictionary of Americanisms with having invented the word hunky-dory (spelled in apparent Japanese fashion, Hunkidori, and mentioning Yeddo), meaning "Superlatively good" or "everything is all right". (Note: However, Nicoline van der Sijs provides evidence of the phrase gaining popularity in the US via multiple channels, and the likely primary origin is as a variation on the Dutch word hunk used in children's games meaning "home base". This may demonstrate that Dilward popularized the term rather than inventing it.) In 1887, the Indiana State Sentinel newspaper stated that Dilward was of Native American and African American ancestry.

== Background ==
Dilward was born in Brooklyn, New York c. 1817. (Note: Dilward's obituary from 1887 stated that he died at the age of 70. The difference between the year 1887 and the age 70 provides an approximate birth year of 1817.) He first performed with George Christy in 1853, possibly as a response to General Tom Thumb, a dwarf appearing in productions staged by P. T. Barnum. Into the late 1860s, Dilward performed with Dan Bryant's Minstrels, Wood's Minstrels, the Morris Brothers' Minstrels, and Kelly and Leon's Minstrels. Beginning in the 1860s, he appeared with a number of black minstrel troupes. Between 1866 and 1873 he had a successful career in Britain initially with Sam Hague's Slave Troupe, then with other people and companies, including George Christy's Minstrels. He went to Australia and New Zealand, returning to Britain with an Australian minstrel company in 1880. At the end of this British tour in 1881, he returned to America, where he died in 1887.

Modern writers, such as Mel Watkins, cite Dilward (Note: However, his name appears as Dilverd in primary sources, like the 1881 British census and his obituaries.) as possibly being one of the first black entertainers to present some element of authentic black dance on the white American stage. He would also have had opportunity to present some degree of black comedy and song, but he probably did not stray far from the traditional, white-defined material.

== Career ==
Reports of Dilward's height ranged from just under 2 to 3 ft (61 to 91 cm) tall. He quickly developed talents to entertain people because this was the most promising plan to support himself. He could sing, dance, act, and play violin. Dilward went on to perform in blackface minstrelsy, which was considered a low form of entertainment, even in the mid-19th century. Most of these shows featured white people using "blackface" to imitate African-Americans and consisted of comic skits, dancing, and music, but for most of the time relied on humor was at the expense of African Americans. Frederick Douglass, who was a contemporary social reformer, said of these minstrel shows that they comprised "filthy scum of white society, who have stolen from us a complexion denied to them by nature, in which to make money and pander to the corrupt taste of their fellow citizens."

Dilward's stage name was Japanese Tommy. The reasons for the name are unknown, but it is rumored that it was created to conceal his identity as an African-American because audiences did not want to pay to see a black person perform. The name may also have been assumed to capitalize on a diplomat from Japan whose arrival caused a sensation in America. The diplomat himself was referred to as Japanese Tommy. Dilward was one of the only two known African-Americans to have performed with white minstrel companies before the American Civil War. These black minstrel troupes made appearances around the mid-1850s. These groups advertised themselves as genuine but mostly used burnt cork to cover their face and make it black. Once African-Americans started to appear on stage without blackface, audiences were surprised at the variety of skin colors that existed. (Knowles)

Even though Dilward faced extreme inequality and discrimination, he made the best of his situation and embraced his size and race in order to benefit himself financially. He was permitted to perform in these white minstrel shows because he was considered an "oddity" due to his height. The demand to see him was very high. In the Lewiston Evening Journal of 1871 there is an advertisement for the Morris Brothers minstrel show, which features him and his "enormous salary" of $200 per week in gold. In many other newspapers during the mid-19th century that had advertisements for minstrel shows, Japanese Tommy usually headlined their advertisement. Advertisers went as far as referring to him as "The Wonderful Japanese Tommy". Dilward performed in a number of different minstrel shows including Dan Bryant's Minstrels, Wood's Minstrels, Morris Brothers' Minstrels, and Kelly & Leon's Minstrels.

Some modern historians such as Mel Watkins cite Dilward as possibly being one of the first black entertainers to present some element of authentic black dance on the white American stage. The first of these minstrel shows started to debut in the mid-1800s. Most all of these shows consisted of white performers using blackface. Once people realized the success these groups were having, minstrel groups began forming that consisted of entirely black performers. This became an outlet for African American performers to benefit financially. In general, though, these shows exhibited high levels of racism and discrimination that were used as comedic material. These minstrel shows had overall probably a negative effect on civil rights and African Americans in general. The only beneficial factor of these shows for African Americans was probably the financial compensation for only a very few black performers such as Dilward.

Thomas Dilward was a pioneer in African American culture as well as the entertainment industry. His artistic value triumphed any physical feature that was used as comedy. As advertisers used Japanese Tommy as their headliner and often did not indicate his height or race may be proof that Dilward's singing, dancing, and musicianship were superior so that these were enough to attract audiences. However it may also indicate that his reputation was well known. Regardless, others like a Frenchman named Millet cashed in on his fame, while he was abroad

Dilward's career in Great Britain and its then-colonies of Australia and New Zealand gave him the opportunity to appear in less racist societies, although they were not completely free of prejudice. In those locations, his colour was not, it appears, a major feature in his various acts; his height was what was emphasized. One of the most popular elements of his act in Britain was a song, “The Mulligan Guard”, which had an Irish theme.

== Death ==
Dilward died in Manhattan on July 9, 1887; he was buried three days later in his hometown of Brooklyn at the Cemetery of the Evergreens.
