= Slave in a Box =

1998 book by Maurice M. Manring

- Title page for Slave in a Box: The Strange Career of Aunt Jemima (1998)
- Author: Maurice M. Manring
- Language: English
- Subject: Aunt Jemima
- Genre: Non-fiction
- Publisher: University of Virginia Press
- Publication date: 1998
- Publication place: United States

Slave in a Box: The Strange Career of Aunt Jemima is a 1998 non-fiction book by Maurice M. Manring, published by University of Virginia Press. It covers Aunt Jemima.

According to Publishers Weekly, the book focuses more on how marketing used desires from White Americans to sell products and less on a history of Aunt Jemima. Manring stated that Aunt Jemima was used a form of nostalgia for housewives who were unable to have servants but wanted them.

Andrea Higbie, in The New York Times, stated that the book shows how Aunt Jemima is "a damaging racial image."

== Background ==
Manring was an independent scholar. He resided in Columbia, Missouri when the book was released.

== Reception ==
Myrtle Gonza Glascoe of Gettysburg College wrote that the work is "a must read" for people wishing to explore how capitalist countries have concepts about class, gender, and race.
