= Ted Waldman =

American vaudeville entertainer (1899–1987)

- Born: Theodore Waldman; February 12, 1899; Birmingham, Alabama, U.S.
- Died: February 1, 1987 (aged 87); Los Angeles, U.S.
- Occupations: Vaudeville entertainer, harmonicist
- Years active: c. 1911–1950s

Theodore Waldman (February 12, 1899 – February 1, 1987) was an American vaudeville entertainer and harmonica player.

== Life and career ==
Born in Birmingham, Alabama, Ted Waldman learned harmonica during his childhood and first performed to his customers when working at a cafe in Charlotte, North Carolina. In about 1911, he joined a touring tab show and played in vaudeville houses. He was successful and signed for a mainstream vaudeville company, where he teamed up with comedian Ned Norworth. After a few years, he was heard in New York City by popular entertainer Eva Tanguay, who invited him to join her act. He remained with Tanguay for four years, playing harmonica while she changed outfits, and engaging with her in repartee.

In the 1920s, he worked with his brother Al Waldman in an act called Blue-O-Logy. They both performed in blackface, and Ted Waldman played eleven different mouth organs of different sizes. He claimed to be the first person to play blues on harmonica, and was known for his "clowning and trickery with the garden variety harmonica". The brothers worked together until the late 1930s, when Al retired and Ted's wife Priscilla joined in his place, playing ukulele. During World War II, the couple toured with the USO in Australia and elsewhere. A Billboard review in 1941 said: "Ted Waldman kept them laughing with his harmonica imitations and off-key strayings. He offers a novel closing by playing the instrument without use of hands, running up the scale and drawing It in as he goes until it seems he must swallow the harmonica to hit the top note....".

After retirement, Waldman and his wife did voluntary work at the Motion Picture Country House in California. He died in Los Angeles in 1987 at the age of 87.
