= Bob Height =

African American comedian and dancer

Bob Height was an American 19th-century African-American blackface minstrel performer. He was a standout talent in the companies with which he performed, although frustrations eventually drove him to pursue a career in Europe. Later writers have compared him to his contemporary, Bert Williams.

Height joined with Charles Hicks in the late 1860s to form Hicks and Height's Georgia Minstrels. This company proved quite popular among African Americans, particularly in the Washington, D.C. area. Eventually, both Hicks and Height joined Sam Hague's Slave Troupe of Georgia Minstrels. Height became a featured talent and accompanied the troupe on a European tour in the early 1870s.

Upon the troupe's return to the US in 1872, Charles Callender purchased it and changed the name to Callender's Original Georgia Minstrels. The new owner helped lead the company to great success, and Height enjoyed high billing alongside Billy Kersands and Pete Devonear. Before long, however, Height and several other performers quit Callender's in a dispute over pay and recognition. They formed a new company, but it saw little success; most of the players soon rejoined Callender's troupe. Height instead emigrated to Europe, where he performed for many years.
