= Brooker and Clayton's Georgia Minstrels =

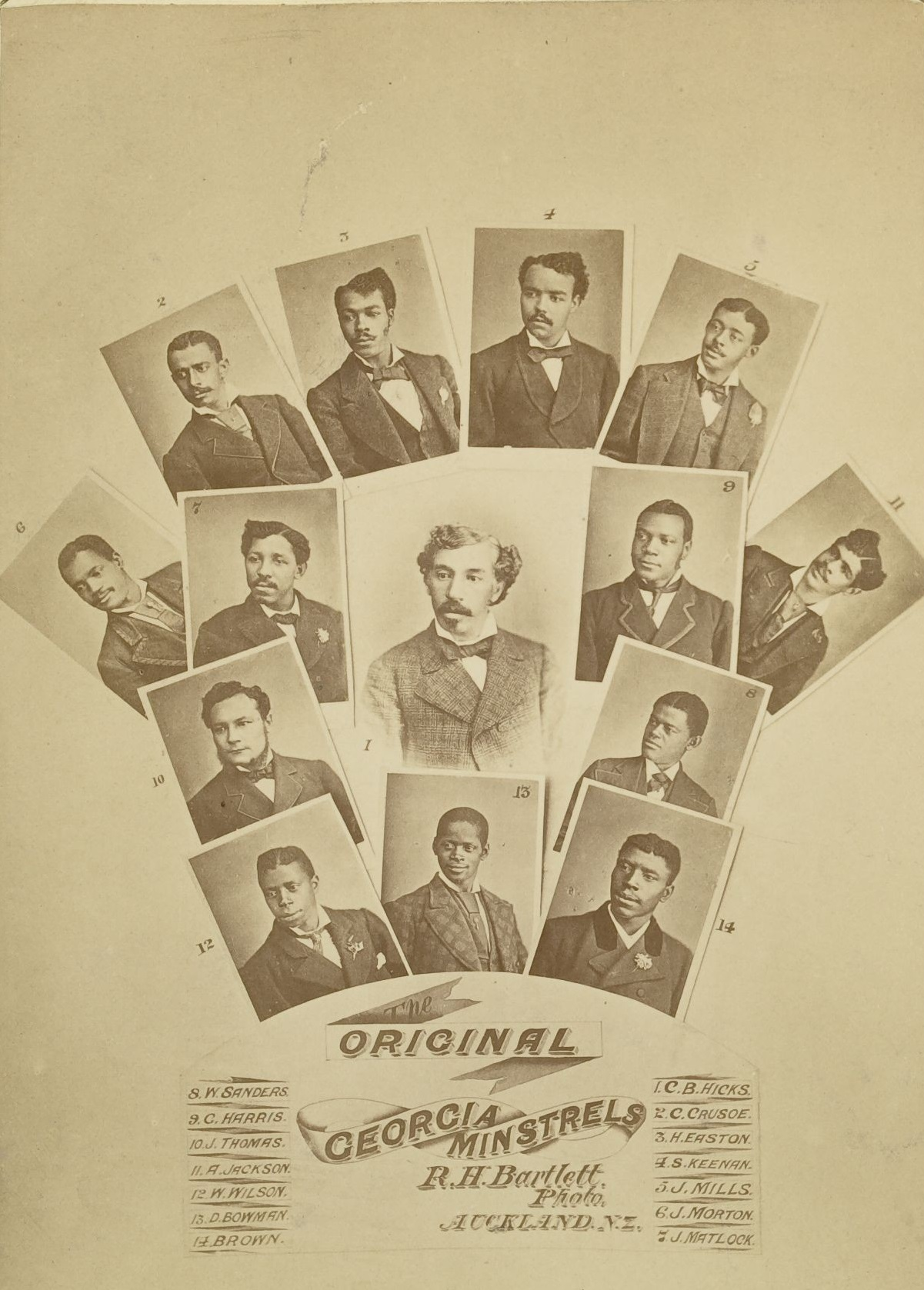
"Original Georgia Minstrels" composite image with founder Charles Hicks at center

Brooker and Clayton's Georgia Minstrels was the first popular African American blackface minstrel troupe. The company was formed in 1865. Under the management of Charles Hicks, the company enjoyed success on tour through the Northeastern United States in 1865 and 1866. They billed themselves as "The Only Simon Pure Negro Troupe in the World" and their act as an "authentic" portrayal of black plantation life. One ad claimed their troupe was "composed of men who during the war were SLAVES IN MACON, GEORGIA, who, having spent their former lives in Bondage . . . will introduce to their patrons PLANTATION LIFE in all its phases." For their part, the public and press largely believed them. One New York newspaper called them "great delineators of darky life" and said that they presented "peculiar music and characteristics of plantation life."

The Georgia Minstrels gained fame and success, and large crowds watched them perform in many cities. They repeatedly outperformed both black and white rivals throughout 1866. Trade journals and theatergoers came to regard them as in the same category as successful all-white companies, and "Georgia" came to signify "Colored" when used in the title of a minstrel troupe. Perhaps most significantly, the success of the Georgia Minstrels spawned many imitators. Other black troupes found greater success and acceptance, and black minstrelsy took off as a genre in its own right.
