= Charles Callender =

19th-century American ministrel troupe owner

Charles Callender was the owner of blackface minstrel troupes that featured African-American performers. Although a tavern owner by trade, he entered show business in 1872, when he purchased Sam Hague's Slave Troupe of Georgia Minstrels.

Renaming them Callender's Original Georgia Minstrels, he and his business manager, Charles Hicks, followed the lead of other showmen such as J. H. Haverly and advertised the troupe far and wide. Callender's Minstrels played to packed houses and positive reviews in the Midwest and Northeast. Over time, the Callender name came to signify "black minstrelsy", and when rival troupes tried to appropriate it, Callender persuaded The Clipper to refrain from writing about them.

Despite the revenues brought in by his star performers, including such talents as Bob Height, Billy Kersands, and Pete Devonear, Callender ignored their demands for more pay and better recognition. Some of them quit to form their own company, an action Callender claimed was tantamount to theft.

The issue came to public attention for its racial implications, and most of the performers who had left eventually returned to Callender. The company stayed at the top of black minstrelsy through the mid-1870s. In 1874 or 1875, Callender organized a second troupe of black minstrels that would tour secondary circuits, such as the Midwest. After a bad year in 1877, he sold his main troupe to J. H. Haverly. He continued to operate his secondary troupe until 1881, when he sold it to Charles and Gustave Frohman.

Callender eventually got back into minstrelsy with new black troupes and stakes in others. He funded non-minstrel fare, such as a staging of Uncle Tom's Cabin starring the Hyers Sisters, Emma Hyer and Anna Hyer. Minstrelsy remained his main draw, and he owned troupes into the 1890s.
