= J. H. Haverly =

American theatre manager and promoter of blackface minstrel shows

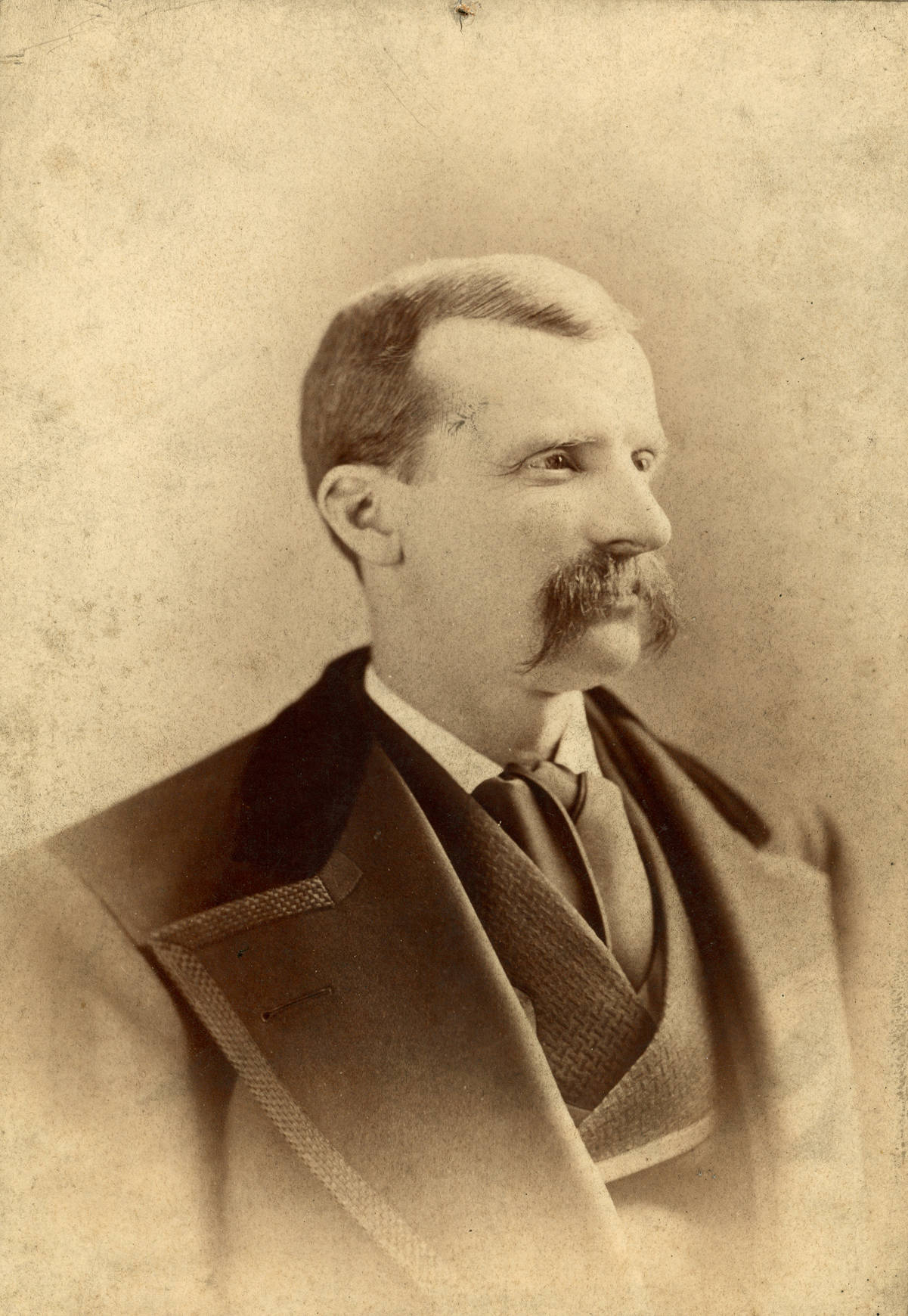
Jack Haverly

Christopher Haverly (June 30,1837– September 27,1901), better known as J. H. Haverly or John H. "Jack" Haverly, was an American theatre manager and promoter of blackface minstrel shows. During the 1870s and 1880s, he created an entertainment empire centered on his minstrel troupes, particularly Haverly's United Mastodon Minstrels and Haverly's Colored Minstrels. Under his guidance, these troupes grew to impressive sizes and featured elaborate sets and costumes. They toured widely, enlarging minstrelsy's audience to encompass the entire United States as well as England. Haverly's methods sparked a revolution in minstrelsy as other troupes scrambled to compete. As the costs of minstrelsy increased, many troupes went out of business.

== Early endeavors ==
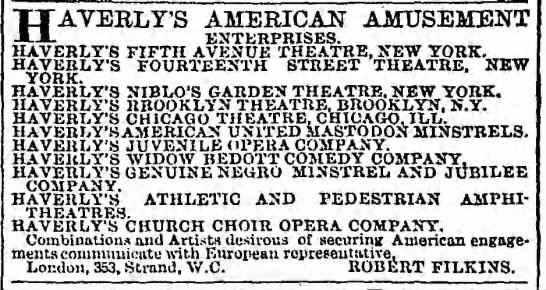
1880 advertisement detailing J. H. Haverly's business enterprises.

Christopher Haverly was born near Bellefonte, Pennsylvania, on June 30, 1837, to parents Christopher and Eliza Haverly (née Steel). In his youth he was known as "Jack" or "Kit", and was apprenticed to a tailor before entering show business.

Haverly was one of a new wave of theater troupe owners and managers who had not entered the profession as a performer himself. He borrowed the techniques of famous showmen like P. T. Barnum to promote his theater companies. In the late 1870s, he turned his eye to the lifeless minstrel show, observing that other entertainments, such as stage plays, operas, and variety shows, had "increased and enlarged their dimensions until their proportions and attractive qualities [had] appeared unlimited." Minstrelsy, on the other hand, had remained much as it had been in the days of the Virginia Minstrels and Ethiopian Serenaders.

His answer would be a company of minstrels "that for extraordinary excellence, merit, and magnitude [would] astonish and satisfy the most exacting amusement seeker in the world." He gathered up a large pool of talented performers and combined them into a single troupe. Aiming his advertisements at the family market and emphasizing his shows' freedom from base humor, they toured the whole United States, not just the Northeastern circuit to which minstrelsy had previously been mostly limited.

Haverly's success in minstrelsy allowed him to finance other ventures. At the height of his fortune, he owned and managed three minstrel troupes and four comic theater groups, in addition to three theaters in New York and one in each of Brooklyn, Chicago, and San Francisco, three mining and milling companies, as well as stock in many others. Haverly's stock investments did not perform as he had wished, and by the end of 1877, he was in debt by as much as $104,000. However, he tried to skirt bankruptcy with another gamble.

== Haverly's United Mastodon Minstrels ==
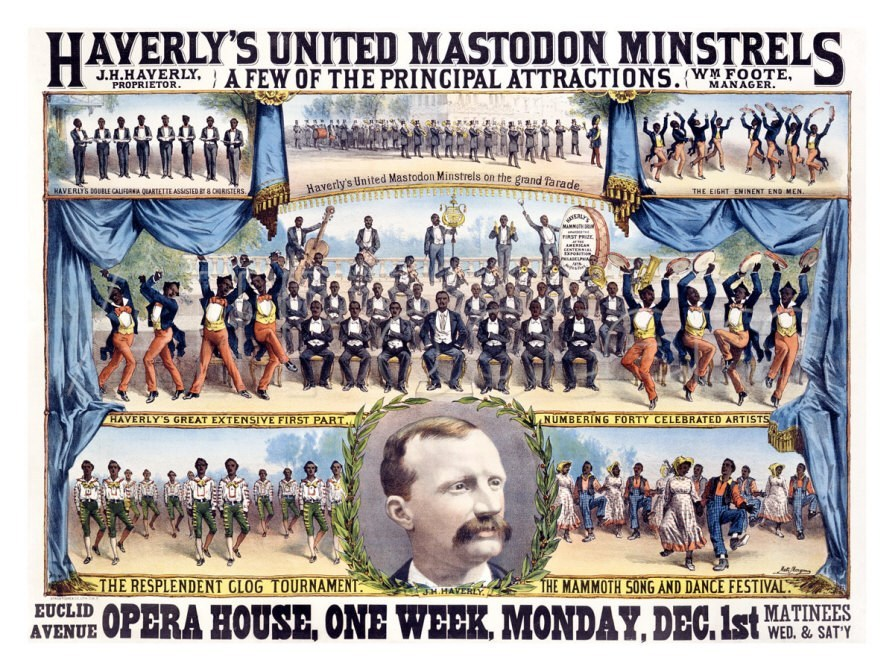
Poster featuring Haverly and his United Mastodon Minstrels

With four minstrel companies as his raw materials, he created a single troupe, dubbed Haverly's United Mastodon Minstrels. He flooded New York with posters and newspaper advertisements twice the size of the ads placed by other troupes. These trumpeted the Mastodons' size: "FORTY—COUNT 'EM—40" members. He paraded his minstrels through every city they played, preceded by a brass band. In 1878, he added a drum corps that could play simultaneously in another section of town. He found other ways to emphasize the troupe's size, one being a series of curtains pulled back in succession, each revealing more than a dozen men standing behind it.

Haverly's shows were also more visually stunning than anything that had preceded them. One program read, "The attention of the public is respectfully called to the magnificent scene representing a Turkish Barbaric Palace in Silver and Gold", and the production delivered what had been promised. In addition, a lavish royal palace appeared at one point, followed by a succession of non-connected scenes: "Base-Ball", "The Strong Defending the Weak," "United We Stand," and "The Dying Athlete". The show ended with a circus-like production in the tradition of Barnum. The show represented Haverly's mantra as a producer: "I've got only one method, and that is to find out what the people want and then give them that thing . . . . There's no use trying to force the public into a theater."

Haverly's shows were different, and he took every opportunity to emphasize this in his advertisements. He stressed the high costs of production. He continued to purchase minstrel troupes throughout the 1870s and 80s and to absorb them into the Mastodons. The troupe had over 100 members at one point.

== Haverly's Colored Minstrels ==
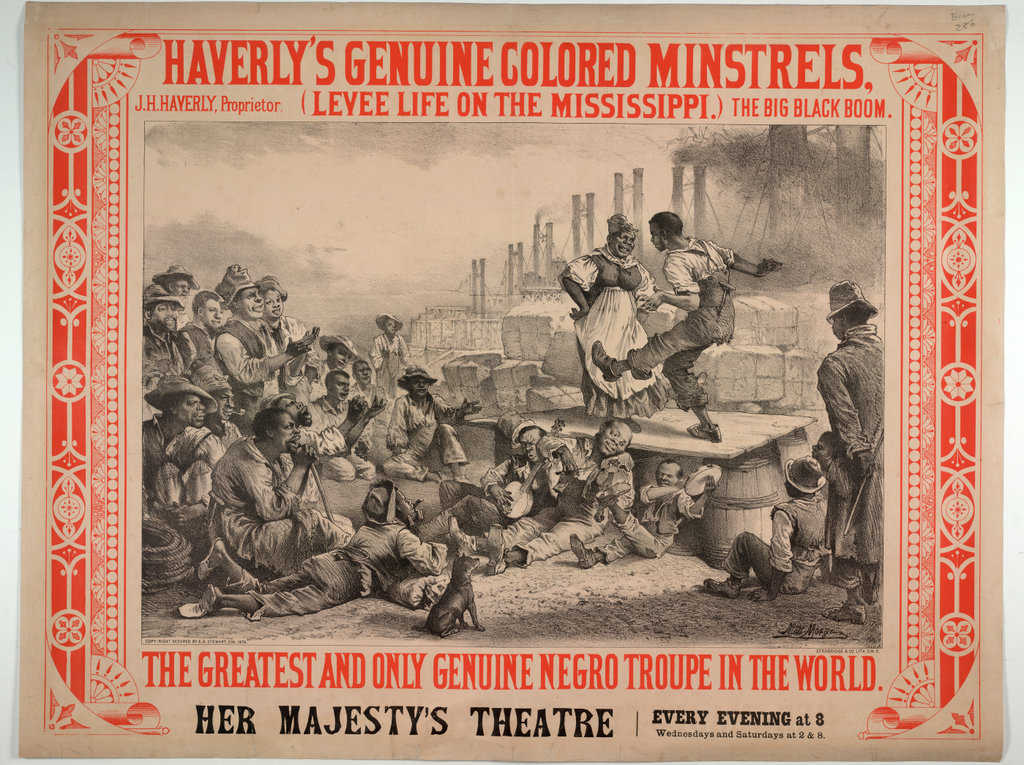
Poster showing a part of the Colored Minstrels performance. In the summer of 1881, Haverly's Genuine Colored Minstrels performed in London at Her Majesty's Theatre. The newspaper advertised that these would not be men in blackface, as the Mastodon Minstrels had been the year before.

Meanwhile, Haverly entered the market of black minstrelsy and bought Charles Callender's Original Georgia Minstrels in 1878, renaming them Haverly's Colored Minstrels. Haverly promoted the troupe with the same panache he employed for the Mastodons, and he bought other black troupes to increase their size. He also reinforced the belief that black minstrels were authentic portrayers of African American life by moving to a format of almost all plantation-themed material. In place of Turkish baths, audiences got "THE DARKY AS HE IS AT HOME, DARKY LIFE IN THE CORNFIELD, CANEBRAKE, BARNYARD, AND ON THE LEVEE AND FLATBOAT". In 1880, he even went so far as to create a mock plantation in a Boston field with over a hundred black actors in costume, including "overseers, bloodhounds and darkies at work ... indulging in songs, dances [and] antics peculiar to their people" On July 31, 1881, the 60-strong Haverly's Colored Minstrels opened at Her Majesty's Theatre in London, where The Times wrote: "There can be no doubt of the spontaneity of the outbursts of sound, or of the enjoyment with which the performers take part in the dances and frolics of the evening. The heartiness of their fun seems to communicate itself to the audience." Peter Fryer notes: "There were 20 dancers, a banjo orchestra, and 8 players of bones and 8 of tambourines -16 musicians who sat in two rows on the stage and made 'a most picturesque display in unison'." The huge troupe was successful, but Haverly found it difficult to manage both them and the Mastodons. He sold the Georgia Minstrels to Charles and Gustave Frohman in 1882.
