= John Thomas Douglass =

American composer, violinist, conductor and teacher (1847–1886)

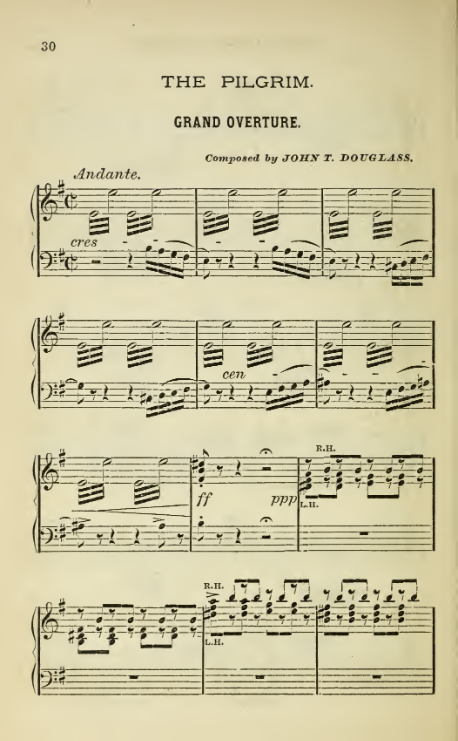
First page of The Pilgrim: Grand Overture by Douglass

John Thomas Douglass (1847–1886) was an American composer, virtuoso violinist, conductor and teacher. He is best known for composing Virginia's Ball (1868), which is generally regarded as the first opera written by an African-American composer. The work is now lost, and his only extant composition is The Pilgrim: Grand Overture (1878) for piano. His biography from James Monroe Trotter's Music and Some Highly Musical People (1878)—in which The Pilgrim survives—reports that he wrote many now lost pieces for piano, orchestra and particularly guitar, which he was known to play.

A highly regarded violinist, Douglass's violin playing received high praise during his lifetime. In addition to his solo career, he traveled with various groups throughout the 1870s, including the Hyers Sisters. He settled in New York by the 1880s and conducted both a music studio and string ensemble. Later in life he led a teaching studio, and among his students was David Mannes who became the concertmaster of the New York Symphony Orchestra. Nearly 30 years after Douglass's death at age 38–39, Mannes founded the Colored Music Settlement School in the memory of his teacher.

== Life and career ==
John Thomas Douglass was born in New York City in 1847. Virtually nothing else is known about his early life, though it is thought that during his youth—due to a wealthy patron—he was able to study in Europe.

He settled in New York by the late 1860s. His three-act opera Virginia's Ball premiered in New York, at the Stuyvesant Institute on Broadway; the music is now lost. The work was registered with the United States Copyright Office in 1868, and musicologist Eileen Southern presumes that it had been performed the same year.

In the 1870s he began performing widely, touring with ensembles such as the Georgia Minstrels and the Hyers Sisters. With the Hyers Sisters, the sisters' father, Samuel B. Hyers, organized a company which included Douglass, tenor Wallace King, John W. Luca of the Luca Family Singers and pianist Alexander C. Taylor. He returned to New York in the 1880s, where he conducted a music studio and a string ensemble, the latter of which played for various public entertainments, such as dances. Contemporary sources describe Douglass as "very justly ranked with the best musicians of [the United States]"; "the master violinist"; and "one of the greatest musicians of the race". The Encyclopedia of African American Music (2010) notes that Douglass, along with his contemporaries Walter F. Craig and Joseph Douglass—all active in New York—joined their older contemporary Edmond Dédé in the pantheon of major Black violinists of the time. (Note: Joseph Douglass is unrelated to John Thomas Douglass.) Craig and John Thomas Douglass in particular obtained a "high level of virtuosity". He was also known to have played guitar.

Douglass managed a teaching studio; as Southern explains, "like many concert artists of the time, Douglass could not earn a living solely [performing] with his violin." His violin students included both David Mannes and Albert Mando. Mannes was later a violinist and then concertmaster of the New York Symphony Orchestra, founding the Colored Music Settlement School in 1916 in the memory of Douglass. Douglass died in 1886 at the age of 38–39 and did not live to see the creation of the school.

He has a short biography in James Monroe Trotter's historical study, Music and Some Highly Musical People (1878), written while Douglass was in his thirties.

== Works ==
The first few pages of The Pilgrim: A Grand Overture

Only two works of Douglass's are known, Virginia's Ball and The Pilgrim: Grand Overture—only The Pilgrim has survived. He supposedly wrote numerous other works, based on Trotter's assertion that "He has also composed many fine pieces for orchestras and for piano." Trotter also reported that Douglass arranged and composed a "great deal of music" for guitar.

Works by other Black composers of this period have generally not survived. Like Douglass, Frederick Elliott Lewis (1846–18?) and Jacob J. Sawyer (1856–1885) only have a single surviving keyboard work, (Note: Free scores by Frederick Elliott Lewis at the International Music Score Library Project (IMSLP). Free scores by Jacob J. Sawyer at the International Music Score Library Project (IMSLP).) all published in Music and Some Highly Musical People. (Note: While the surviving keyboard works by Douglass (The Pilgrim: Grand Overture), Lewis (Scenes of Youth: Fantasia for Piano), and Sawyer (Welcome to the Era) are in Music and Some Highly Musical People, Sawyer has a multitude of other works that have survived, while Douglass and Lewis only have their respective keyboard work.)

=== Virginia's Ball ===
Virginia's Ball was an opera in 3 acts by John Thomas Douglass. It was premiered in 1868 at the Stuyvesant Institute on Broadway and is only known to have been performed once; it is now lost. It is generally considered to be the first opera by a Black composer. However, Southern notes that Harry Lawrence Freeman may be considered the first significant Black composer of opera, as he wrote 14 and had five performed from 1893 to 1947 during his lifetime. (Note: Louisa Melvin Delos Mars was the first Black female composer to write an opera and have it performed. This occurred with her operetta Leoni, the Gypsy Queen, premiered in Providence, Rhode Island in 1889.) (Note: Throughout the 20th century, Freeman was thought to be the first Black composer to write an opera, until Southern's The Music of Black Americans: A History (1971) revealed Douglass's contribution.)

Musicologists Mellonee V. Burnim and Portia K. Maultsby note that in the late 19th-century African Americans were working to associate themselves with the "lavish forms of entertainment" in the vein of noted opera composers such as Wolfgang Amadeus Mozart, Gioachino Rossini and Giuseppe Verdi. The profit from works like Virginia's Ball was likely minuscule.

=== The Pilgrim ===
Douglass's The Pilgrim: Grand Overture for piano was published by the Lee & Shepard firm in 1878 for Trotter's study. According to Trotter, Douglass wrote the piece in his twenties (1867–1876). The piece is 173 bars, in the key of E minor and marked Andante initially, but has many tempo changes throughout: Andante, Allegro Vivace, Adagio, Allegro, Lento and Allegro. The regular use of scales, tremolos and embellishments evokes the sense of a piano transcription from an orchestral score.
