= Nico Schüler =

German-American Music Scholar

- Born: May 5, 1970 (age 56); Roßlau, Bezirk Halle, East Germany
- Education: University of Greifswald (MA), Michigan State University (PhD)
- Occupations: music theorist, musicologist, composer, educator
- Notable work: Computer-Assisted Music Analysis
- Title: University Distinguished Professor at Texas State University
- Musical career
- Genres: World music, Popular music, contemporary music, classical music
- Instruments: piano, vocalist
- Website: www.nicoschuler.com

Nico Schüler (born 5 May 1970) is a German-American music theorist, musicologist, composer, and university professor, whose scholarly work has been reviewed in peer-reviewed journals. He is listed in the Biography and Genealogy Master Index, in Who's Who in America and in Who's Who of Emerging Leaders.

== Life ==
Born in Roßlau, in the Bezirk Halle of East Germany, Schüler grew up in Greifswald and studied music education, musicology, philosophy, and computer science at the University of Greifswald and at Humboldt University of Berlin. In 2000, he received a Ph.D. in music theory from Michigan State University with a dissertation on computer-assisted music analysis. After two years of teaching at Central Michigan University (1999-2001), he joined Texas State University as Assistant Professor and Coordinator of Music Theory in 2001. He was promoted to associate professor in 2006, to professor in 2009, and named University Distinguished Professor of Music Theory and Musicology in 2017.

== Academic activities ==
Schüler's publications are focussed on the rediscovery of forgotten or underrepresented musicians (e.g., Jacob J. Sawyer, Sam Lucas, The Hyers Sisters, Billy Kersands, Wallace King, Gussie Davis, Cornelia Schröder-Auerbach), computer-applications in music research, methodology of music research, music of the 20th century (e.g., Dietrich Erdmann, Hanning Schröder, Kurt Schwaen, Burkhard Meier, or Peter Harlan), music theory pedagogy, and music historiography. He is the co-editor of the international book series Methodology of Music Research. Schüler is an editorial board member of the scholarly journal New Sound, and he was a keynote speaker at the 13th Biennial International Conference on Music Theory and Analysis in Belgrade in 2019. Further, he served as president of the American Musicological Society Southwest Chapter (2016-2019) and president of the College Music Society South Central Chapter (2007-2009 and 2017-2019). As a composer, he has written piano and electronic music, and he has been an officer of the Texas Chapter of the National Association of Composers USA (NACUSA).

== Publications ==
- Acquavella-Rauch, Stefanie, Birger Petersen, and Nico Schüler (Eds.). Transatlantic Perspectives on Hidden Late 19th Century Music Cultures. Berlin, New York: Peter Lang, 2026. ISBN 978-3631868690.
- Schüler, Nico. "Computerunterstützte Musikanalyse", Handbuch Musikanalyse: Pluralität und Methode, ed. by Ariane Jeßulat, Oliver Schwab-Felisch, Jan Philipp Sprick, and Christian Thorau. Kassel: Bärenreiter, 2025. pp. 378-390. ISBN 978-3-7618-2065-0. https://doi.org/10.1007/978-3-476-06006-8
- Schüler, Nico. "Digital Humanities", MGG Online, edited by Laurenz Lütteken, New York, Kassel, Stuttgart: Bärenreiter, et al., September 2023, https://www.mgg-online.com/mgg/stable/499900.
- Schüler, Nico. "The Degree of Rubato in Performances of Bach’s Invention No. 9: Two Case Studies", Softwaregestützte Interpretationsforschung, Grundsätze, Desiderate und Grenzen, edited by Julian Caskel, Frithjof Vollmer, and Thomas Wozonig. Würzburg: Königshausen u. Neumann, 2022. pp. 167–179. ISBN 978-3-82-607433-2.
- Schüler, Nico. "Toward a Higher Accuracy of Note Onset Detection", Softwaregestützte Interpreta-tionsforschung, Grundsätze, Desiderate und Grenzen, edited by Julian Caskel, Frithjof Vollmer, and Thomas Wozonig. Würzburg: Königshausen u. Neumann, 2022. pp. 419–424. ISBN 978-3-82-607433-2.
- Schüler, Nico. "Online Research Methods for Rediscovering Forgotten Composers: Using Online Databases and Archives", Music in the Disruptive Era, edited by David Hurwitz and Pedro Ordóñez Eslava. Turnhout: Brepols, 2022. pp. 97–112.
- Schüler, Nico. "Orientation Processes and Perspectivism in the Spatiality of Music-Theoretical Research: Reflections on the Plurality of Modern Methods and Methodology of Music Analysis", Music and Space: Theoretical and Analytical Perspectives, ed. by Ivana Ilić, Jelena Mihajlović-Marković, and Miloš Zatkalik. Belgrade, 2021. pp. 38–58. ISBN 978-86-81340-30-1.
- Schüler, Nico. "Otto Laske and the Visualization of Electro‐Acoustic Music: Laske’s Visual Music Animations", Emille, the Journal of the Korean Electro-Acoustic Music Society 18 (2020): 61–67.
- Schüler, Nico. "Modern Approaches to Teaching Sight Singing and Ear Training", Facta Universitatis – Visual Arts and Music 6/2 (2020): 83–92.
- Schüler, Nico. "Contextuality and Interdisciplinarity in Digital Music Research: History, Current Projects, and A Case Study," Contextuality of Musicology – What, How, Why and Because, edited by Tijana Popović Mladjenović, Ana Stefanović, Radoš Mitrović, and Vesna Mikić. Belgrade, Serbia: Faculty of Music, 2020. pp. 86–96. ISBN 978-86-81340-25-7.
- Schüler, Nico. "Expressive Timing at the Beginning of Beethoven’s Piano Sonata op. 2 no. 1," Musica Movet: Affectus, Ludus, Corpus, edited by Milena Medić. Belgrade, Serbia: University of Arts, 2019. pp. 177–186. ISBN 9788681340073.
- Schüler, Nico. "The Development of Computing Technology and Its Influence on Music-Analytical Methods and Encoding: 1940s through 1980s," Music Encoding Conference Proceedings 2017: 131-133. [published in 2019]
- Schüler, Nico. "New Discoveries on African-American Composer Jacob J. Sawyer (1856-1885)," South Central Music Bulletin XVII (2018-2019): 23-36.
- Schüler, Nico. "Current Research Methodologies For Rediscovering Forgotten Composers: Using Commercial Genealogy And Newspaper Databases And Other Online Archives", Music in Society 2018: 369–386.
- Schüler, Nico. "Analytical Observations of Duality in Time by James (Jim) C. Scully," New Sound: International Journal of Music 50 (2018): 189-196.
- Schüler, Nico, Chris Walton, and Marcel Cobussen. "Virtual Panel Discussion," New Sound: International Journal of Music 50 (2018): 17-23.
- Schüler, Nico. "Computer-Assisted Music Analysis: Historical Reflections, Recent Approaches, and Common Methods", MusikTheorie – Zeitschrift für Musikwissenschaft 32/4 (2017): 317–329.
- Schüler, Nico. "Rediscovering Forgotten Composers with the Help of Online Genealogy and Music Score Databases: A Case Study on African-American Composer Jacob J. Sawyer (1856-1885)", Musicological Annual 51/2 (2015): 85–97.
- Schüler, Nico. Computer-Assisted Music Analysis (1950s-1970s): Essays and Bibliographies. Frankfurt / New York: Peter Lang, 2014. ISBN 978-3-631-39764-0.
- Stefanija, Leon, and Nico Schüler (Eds.): Approaches to Music Research: Between Practice and Epistemology. Frankfurt / New York: Peter Lang, 2011. ISBN 978-3-631-59200-7.
- Stefanija, Leon, Nico Schüler, Tuomas Eerola, Reiko Graham, Vanessa Nering, and Mirjana Veselinović-Hofman: Musical Listening Habits of College Students in Finland, Slovenia, South Africa, and Texas: Similarities and Differences. Frankfurt / New York: Peter Lang, 2010. ISBN 978-3-631-57268-9.
- Schüler, Nico. [Ed.] On Methods of Music Theory and (Ethno-) Musicology: From Interdisciplinary Research to Teaching. Frankfurt / New York: Peter Lang, 2005. ISBN 978-3631543900.
- Schüler, Nico. "On Continuity and Innovation in Contemporary Music," New Sound: International Magazine for Music 22 (2003): 77-78.
- Schüler, Nico. "Towards a History of Computer-Assisted Music Analysis: Developments since 1989," Journal of the Institute for Music Research at Kyunghee University [South Korea] I (October 2003): 325-342.
- Schüler, Nico. [Ed.] Computer-Applications in Music Research: Concepts, Methods, Results. New York: Peter Lang, 2002. ISBN 978-3631390320.
- Schüler, Nico. "Music Analysis of the Next Generation? Recent Development in Computer-Assisted Music Analysis," New Sound. International Magazine for Music 20 (2002): 34-47.
- Schüler, Nico. "A Reader Responds [Curricular Ideas for Ear Training and Sight Singing]," The College Music Society Newsletter May 2002: p. 5.
- Schüler, Nico. Hanning Schröder. Dokumente und Kritisches Werkverzeichnis [Hanning Schröder. Documents and Critical Catalog of Works], Verdrängte Musik vol. 15, Hamburg: von Bockel, 1996. ISBN 978-3928770675.
- Schüler, Nico. [Ed.] Zwischen Noten- und Gesellschaftssystemen. Festschrift für Cornelia Schröder-Auerbach zum 95. Geburtstag und zum Andenken an Hanning Schröder anläßlich seines 100. Geburtstages, Frankfurt/ M., New York: Peter Lang, 1996. ISBN 978-3631498323.
- Ochs, Ekkehard, and Nico Schüler (Eds.). Festschrift Kurt Schwaen zum 85. Geburtstag. Frankfurt/M., New York: Peter Lang, 1995. ISBN 978-3631475522.
- Schüler, Nico. Zum Problem und zu Methoden von Musikanalyse [On the Problem and on Methods of Music Analysis]. Hamburg: von Bockel, 1996. ISBN 978-3928770798.
- Schüler, Nico. Erkenntnistheorie, Musikwissenschaft, Künstliche Intelligenz und der Prozeß: Ein Gespräch mit Otto Laske, Peenemünde: Dietrich, 1995. ISBN 3-930066-14-9.
- Schüler, Nico, and Dirk Uhrlandt: MUSANA 1.0 / 1.1 - ein Musikanalyseprogramm: Programmdokumentation, Peenemünde: Axel Dietrich, 1994 / 1996 [with a PC disc]. ISBN 3-930066-24-6.
- Schüler, Nico, and Lutz Winkler (Eds.): [On Inter-Regional Music Cultural Relations in the Baltic Area. Papers of the Academic Colloquium within the Scope of the Greifswald Music Days on November 29th, 1992] Zu interregionalen musikkulturellen Beziehungen im Ostseeraum. Referate des wissenschaftlichen Kolloquiums im Rahmen der Greifswalder Musiktage am 29. November 1992. Greifswald, 1993.
- Schüler, Nico (Ed.): [Chamber Music Today 3. Composers, Works, Analyses, Interview] Kammermusik Heute 3. Komponisten, Werke, Analysen, Interview. Greifswald, 1993.
- Schüler, Nico (Ed.): [Chamber Music Today 2. Composers, Works, Analyses, Interviews, Methods] Kammermusik Heute 2. Komponisten, Werke, Analysen, Interviews, Methoden. Greifswald, 1992.
- Schüler, Nico, and Lutz Winkler (Ed.). [Wolfgang Amadeus Mozart. Papers of the Academic Colloquium of the Greifswald Mozart-Days on Dezember 3rd, 1991] Wolfgang Amadeus Mozart. Referate des wissenschaftlichen Kolloquiums der Greifswalder Mozart-Tage am 3. Dezember 1991. Greifswald, 1992.
- Schüler, Nico, and Manfred Vetter (Eds.). [Chamber Music Today. Composers, Musicians, Works, Analyses, Methods] Kammermusik Heute. Komponisten, Interpreten, Werke, Analysen, Methoden. Greifswald, 1991.
