= Jacob J. Sawyer =

American composer, pianist, and conductor (1856–1885)

Jacob J. Sawyer (1856–1885) was an American composer, pianist, songwriter, and conductor. His Welcome to the Era March (1877) was included in James Monroe Trotter's Music and Some Highly Musical People (1878).

== Life and career ==
Jacob J. Sawyer was born in Boston on 5 November 1856. He toured with different groups, such as the Hyers Sisters, the Louisiana Jubilee Singers, and Haverly's Colored Minstrels (owned and managed by Jack Haverly). After a 5-month tour to England with Haverly's Colored Minstrels, Sawyer returned to Boston in late 1881, where he started working at the Boston branch of the bank and brokerage firm T. Brigham Bishop & Co. He later performed with the Virginia Jubilee Singers, the Sam Lucas Jubilee Songsters, the Maryland Jubilee Singers, and the Slayton Ideal Company (a jubilee troupe by African-American actor and singer Sam Lucas). In 1884, he became the musical director of the Nashville Students. He died from tuberculosis on 3 June 1885.

== Works ==
- Sawyer, Jacob J. Out of Bondage Waltz for piano [op. 2], Cincinnati 1879.
- Sawyer, Jacob J. Seventh Exposition Grand March for piano [op. 3], Cincinnati 1879.
- Sawyer, Jacob J. All the Rage (Grand March) for piano, Boston 1880.
- Sawyer, Jacob J. Up in a Corner (Schottisch) for piano, Philadelphia 1881.
- Sawyer, Jacob J. Return of Spring (Polka) for piano, New York 1882.
- Sawyer, Jacob J. The Bijou March for piano, New York 1882.
- Sawyer, Jacob J. Etta Polka for piano, New York 1882.
- Sawyer, Jacob J. Jersey Lily Waltzes for piano, Boston 1882.
- Sawyer, Jacob J. Little Sweetheart (Schottische) for piano, New York 1882.
- Sawyer, Jacob J. Lotta Schottisch for piano, Boston 1882.
- Sawyer, Jacob J. Old "49" Schottische for piano, New York 1882.
- Sawyer, Jacob J. Rosebud (Gavotte) for piano, New York 1882.
- Sawyer, Jacob J. Cambridge Pretty Girls for piano, New York 1882.
- Sawyer, Jacob J. Bob-o-link (Mazurka) for piano, Chicago 1883.
- Sawyer, Jacob J. The Rankins' March for piano, Detroit 1883.
- Sawyer, Jacob J. Passion Flower Waltzes for piano, Detroit 1884.
- Sawyer, Jacob J. Bicycle Waltzes for piano, New York 1885.
- Jubilee Songs and Plantation Melodies, arr. by Jacob J. Sawyer. Chicago, IL: H. B. Thearle, 1884.

== Sources ==
- Bean, Annemarie; Hatch, James V.; Brooks, McNamara, eds. (1996). Inside the Minstrel Mask: Readings in Nineteenth-Century Blackface Minstrelsy. Middletown: Wesleyan University Press. ISBN 978-0-8195-6300-2.
- Burnim, Mellonee V.; Maultsby, Portia K. (2014). African American Music: An Introduction. Abingdon-on-Thames: Taylor & Francis. ISBN 978-1-317-93442-4.
- Glaser, Matt; Shipton, Alyn; Barnett, Anthony (2003) [2002]. "Violin, jazz". Grove Music Online. Oxford: Oxford University Press. doi:10.1093/gmo/9781561592630.article.J468100. ISBN 978-1-56159-263-0. (subscription, Wikilibrary access, or UK public library membership required)
- Graham, Sandra Jean (2015) [2013]. "Hyers Sisters". Grove Music Online. Oxford: Oxford University Press. doi:10.1093/gmo/9781561592630.article.A2284679. ISBN 978-1-56159-263-0. (subscription, Wikilibrary access, or UK public library membership required)
- Kirk, Elise K. (2001). American Opera (Music in American Life). Champaign: University of Illinois Press. ISBN 978-0-252-02623-2.
- Koskoff, Ellen, ed. (2000). Garland Encyclopedia of World Music. Vol. 3: The United States and Canada. New York: Garland Publishing. ISBN 978-0-8240-4944-7. (subscription required)
- de Lerma, Dominique-René (Spring 1990). "A Musical and Sociological Review of Scott Joplin's "Treemonisha"". Black Music Research Journal. 10 (1). University of Illinois Press: 153–159. doi:10.2307/779549. JSTOR 779549.
- Martin, Sherrill (1988). Feel the Spirit: Studies in Nineteenth-century Afro-American Music. Santa Barbara: Greenwood Press. ISBN 978-0-313-26234-0.
- Price III, Emmett G.; Kernodle, Tammy L.; Maxile, Horace, eds. (2011). Encyclopedia of African American Music. Vol. 1. Santa Barbara: ABC-CLIO. ISBN 978-0-313-34200-4.
- Schüler, Nico (2014) [2013]. "Sawyer, Jacob J.". Grove Music Online. Oxford: Oxford University Press. doi:10.1093/gmo/9781561592630.article.A2267610. ISBN 978-1-56159-263-0. (subscription, Wikilibrary access, or UK public library membership required)
- Southern, Eileen (1983) [1971]. The Music of Black Americans: A History. New York: W.W. Norton & Co. ISBN 9780393952797. OCLC 1036776225.
- Southern, Eileen (1982). Biographical Dictionary of Afro-American and African Musicians. Westport, Connecticut .: Greenwood Press. ISBN 9780313213397. OCLC 902119012.
- Southern, Eileen (2001). "Freeman, (Harry) Lawrence". Grove Music Online. Oxford: Oxford University Press. doi:10.1093/gmo/9781561592630.article.10187. ISBN 978-1-56159-263-0. (subscription, Wikilibrary access, or UK public library membership required)
- Trotter, James M. (1878). Music and Some Highly Musical People. Boston: Lee and Shepard. OCLC 1157161991.
