= Music and Some Highly Musical People =

Book by James M. Trotter

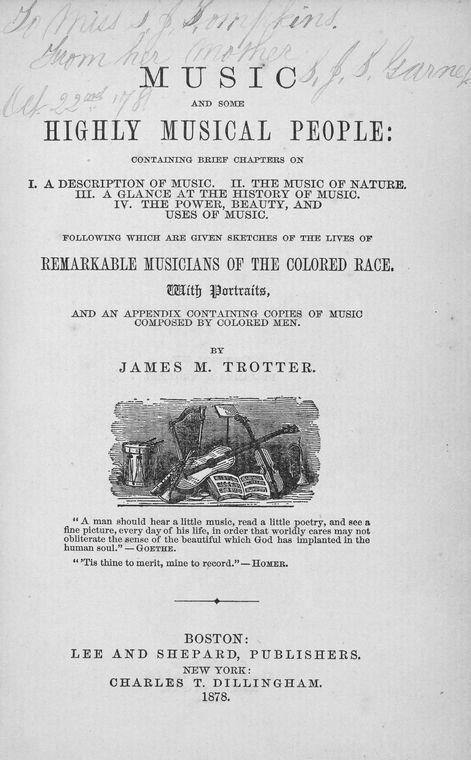
Cover page

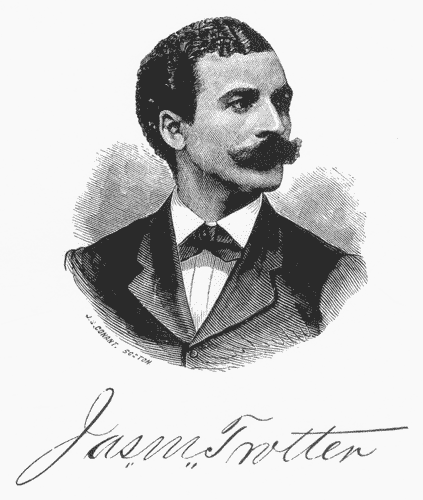
Author, James Monroe Trotter from title page of book.

Music and Some Highly Musical People is a history of African-American music by James Monroe Trotter first published in 1878. It represents perhaps the first attempt to assess American music across multiple genres in a single volume.

The book includes biographies of more than forty African-American musicians and touring groups. Notable inclusions were Elizabeth Taylor Greenfield, Henry F. Williams, Thomas J. Bowers, Thomas Greene Bethune, Rachel M. Washington, Sarah Sedgewick Bowers, the Jubilee Singers of Fisk University, and the Georgia Minstrels.

== Reception ==
The book is an example of a number of works of that era for which "uplifting the race" was a main goal. As with other works, this task was done while traits such as "character, modesty, and industry" were emphasized as a way to "assure whites" that blacks were not a threat. This balance is exemplified by the work of Booker T. Washington, who was at that time beginning his career. Reception of the book initially followed the color line, with most white music critics and historians, especially outside of Trotter's home city of Boston, ignoring the book. Black historians, biographers, and encyclopedists quoted and borrowed freely from the work.

== Contents ==
Trotter's work is highly reflective of the society in which it was written. In his discussion of, for example, Elizabeth Greenfield, Trotter is unable to examine problematic coverage of the singer lest he alienate a white audience which would not recognize the negative effects of stereotyping of black musicians. For instance, he quotes with some approval reviews of Greenfield describing her talent as "untaught" and "innate", subordinating Greenfield to white, civilized, educated musicians. Historian Lawrence Schenbeck describes how Trotter's work shows examples of the Culture of Dissemblance, that is, rejection of a stereotype by becoming the exact opposite of that stereotype. As an example, Trotter's description of Greenfield emphasized childlike moral perfection.

On the other hand, Trotter's work was itself not immune to the scientific racism of the period, for instance he praises lightness of skin and repeats arguments of phrenologists about the relationship between character and cranium shape.

Trotter's coverage of classical music was influenced by a movement to raise classical music and its performance to the level of religious service. A leader in this movement was white journalist John Sullivan Dwight. With this reverence on classical music, Trotter's description of classical soloists such as Thomas Wiggins and Sisieretta Jones become examples of racial culture and uplift through the musical genre itself. However, instead of reassuring whites, encroachment by blacks on white cultural territory described in the book was sometimes at best seen as a curiosity and at worst an affront.

Trotter also covered vernacular music. Trotter covered gospel musicians with much approval, particularly the Fisk Jubilee Singers. On the other hand, Trotter agreed that minstrelsy was usually "disgusting...buffoonery". Even so, the book was the first revisionist look at black minstrelsy, an approach which suggests that out of the racist stereotyping and caricature of the style came the chance for musical expression, employment, and audience happiness. As an example, the book discusses the work of the Georgia Minstrels.

== Influence ==
Eileen Southern calls the book, "the first time that anyone, black or white, had attempted to assess a body of American music that cut across genres and styles".

The book fits into a body of literature of that era and later. In 1883, white composer Frederic Louis Ritter published a similar book about American music as a whole, Music in America, which acknowledges Trotter's research on the contributions by African-Americans to vernacular and classical music. The book more directly influenced many later works on African-American music, especially by black authors, including Penman Lovinggood Sr.'s Famous Modern Negro Musicians in 1921. In 1936, two publications by black authors, Alain LeRoy Locke's, The Negro and His Music and Maud Cuney Hare's Negro Musicians and Their Music, as well as more recent publications such as the work of Eileen Southern, who published The Music of Black Americans: A History in 1971 (second edition in 1983) and began editing the journal The Black Perspective in Music in 1973. Another major, related journal is Black Music Research Journal founded in 1980.

== List of individuals with biographies in anthology ==
- Joseph G. Anderson
- William Appo
- Dennis Auguste
- Basile Bares
- Thomas Greene Bethune
- William Brady
- Nellie E. Brown
- Sarah Sedgewick Bowers
- Thomas J. Bowers
- James Caseras
- Colored American Opera Company
- Walter F. Craig
- Edmond Dédé
- James Gloucester Demarest
- Marice J. B. Doublet
- John T. Douglass
- Dupre Family
- Fisk Jubilee Singers
- Georgia Minstrels
- Elizabeth Taylor Greenfield
- Justin Holland
- Hyers Sisters
- Samuel W. Jamison
- Frank Johnson
- Lambert Family
- Frederick Elliot Lewis
- Luca Family Singers
- Samuel Lucas
- E. V. Macarty
- Thomas Martin
- Charls Martinez
- John Moore
- Peter P. O'Fake
- Samuel Snaer
- William H. Starr
- G. H. W. Stewart
- Rachel M. Washington
- Joseph White
- A. P. Williams
- Henry F. Williams

== Sources ==
- Schenbeck, Lawrence. Racial Uplift and American Music, 1878-1943. Univ. Press of Mississippi, 2012.
- Southern, Eileen. The music of black Americans: A history. WW Norton & Company, 1997.
