= Carve Dat Possum =

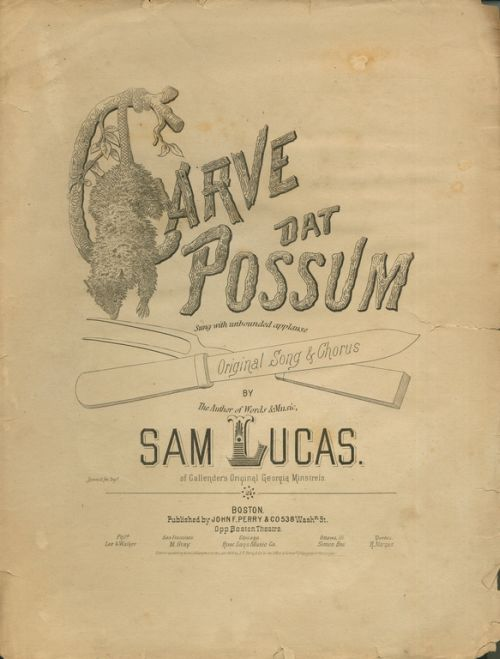
- Cover of "Carve Dat Possum", 1875

Song
- Language: English
- Published: 1875
- Songwriter(s): Sam Lucas

"Carve Dat Possum" is a minstrel song attributed to Sam Lucas in 1875. Very popular in its time, it tells of hunting and preparing a possum to eat. The chorus:

Carve dat possum, carve dat possum, children,
Carve dat possum, carve him to de heart;
Carve dat possum, carve dat possum, children,
Carve dat possum, carve him to de heart.

The song, as published by Lucas, is in 2/4 time.

Although the song was first performed by Lucas, The Pacific Appeal (San Francisco, October 25, 1879) notes that "it was only after a long epistolary discussion that Henry Hart obtained a public acknowledgement that he was the genuine author."

== Bibliography ==
- Johnson, James Weldon. Black Manhattan: Account of the Development of Harlem. New York: Alfred A Knopf (1930).
- Lucas, Sam. "Carve Dat Possum" (sheet music). Boston: John F. Perry & Co. (1875).
