= Out of Bondage (disambiguation) =

Out of Bondage is an autobiography by Linda Lovelace written with Mike McGrady.

Out of Bondage may also refer to:

- Out of Bondage, an 1876 musical written by Joseph Bradford
- Out of Bondage and other stories, a collection of shortstories published by Rowland Robinson in 1905
- Out of Bondage (film) a two-reeler produced in 1915 starring Dorothy Gish
- Out of Bondage: the Story of Elizabeth Bentley, a 1951 autobiography by Elizabeth Bentley
- Out of bondage; Christ and the Indian villager by Stephen Neill (1900–1984) published in 1930
