= Joseph Bradford (playwright) =

American playwright

- Born: William Randolph Hunter; October 24, 1843; Nashville, Tennessee
- Died: April 13, 1886 (aged 42); Boston, Massachusetts
- Writing career
- Pen name: Jay Bee
- Notable work: Out of Bondage

Joseph Bradford (1843–1886) was an American playwright who most famously helped write a landmark production, Out of Bondage, the first African American musical comedy. The show's cast included Pauline Hopkins and the Hyers Sisters, debuting in 1876. The production featured Sam Lucas, a famous minstrel performer of the era.

A White Bostonian, Bradford was also an actor, poet and journalist. He wrote for the Boston Courier as "Jay Bee".

== Works ==
- New German (1872)
- Law in New York (1873)
- 20,000 Leagues Under the Sea (1874) Libretto
- The Conditional Pardon (1875)
- Fritz's Brother (1875)
- Out of Bondage (1876)
- In and Out of Bondage (1877)
- Our Bachelors (1877) OCLC 44017470
- A.A. 1900 (1879)
- John Mishler (1882)
- One of the Finest (1883)
- A Wonderful Woman (1883)
- Cherubs (1885)
- Rose and Coe (1886)
