= Francis Johnson (composer) =

American musician (1792–1844)

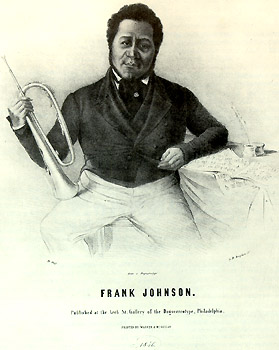
- Posing in Philadelphia

Background information
- Also known as: Frank Johnson
- Born: June 16, 1792; Philadelphia, Pennsylvania, U.S.
- Died: April 6, 1844 (aged 51) Philadelphia, Pennsylvania, U.S.
- Occupations: Musician, teacher
- Instruments: bugle, violin, piano
- Years active: 1810s–1844

Francis Johnson (June 16, 1792 – April 6, 1844) was an American musician and prolific composer during the Antebellum period. African American composers were rare in the U.S. during this period, but Johnson was among the few who were successful. Performing as a virtuoso of the (now rare) keyed Kent bugle and the violin, he wrote more than two hundred compositions of various styles—operatic airs, Ethiopian minstrel songs, patriotic marches, ballads, cotillions, quadrilles, quicksteps and other dances. Only manuscripts and piano transcriptions survive today.

Johnson was among the first African American composers to have his works published as sheet music. He also was the first African American to give public concerts and the first to participate in racially integrated concerts in the United States. He led the first American musical ensemble to present concerts abroad, and he introduced the promenade concert style to America.

== Biography ==
Francis "Frank" Johnson was born in Philadelphia, Pennsylvania, on June 16, 1792, and baptized three months later at St. Paul's Episcopal Church on September 23. He directed military bands and society dance orchestras, taught music, and performed on the violin and keyed bugle. His early career consisted of performing for balls, parades, and dancing schools. He first became widely known in 1818 when George Willig published Johnson's Collection of New Cotillions. His career flourished in the 1820s, as he performed arrangements of "fashionable" music for most of the major dance functions in Philadelphia. In 1837 Johnson and a small ensemble of African American musicians sailed to England to take part in the celebrations surrounding the ascent of Queen Victoria to the British throne. While there, he was exposed to the promenade concert style. When Johnson returned from England in 1838 he introduced this new style of concert in Philadelphia during the Christmas season.

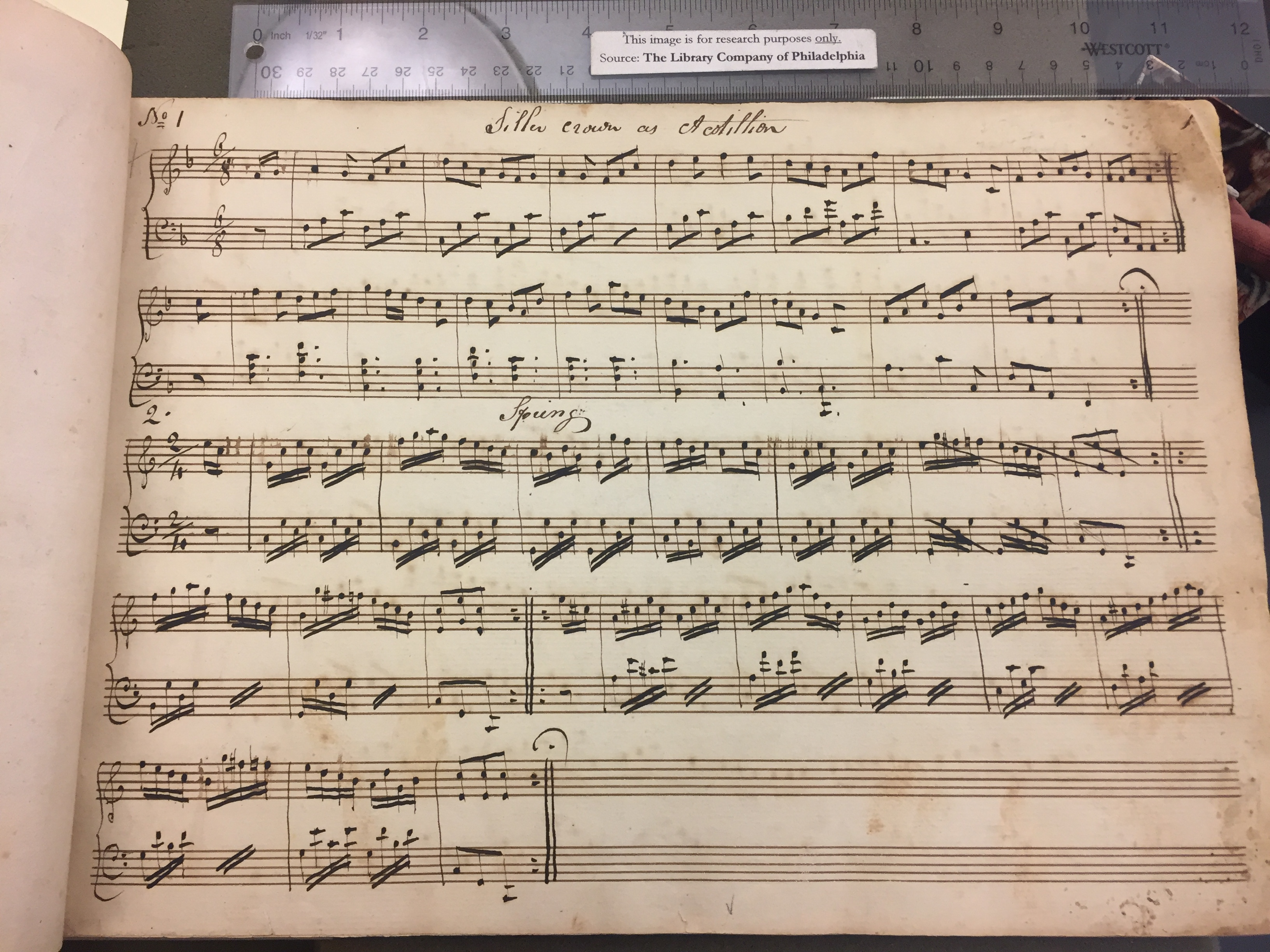
Frank Johnson piano manuscript, 1820. The Library Company of Philadelphia.

Johnson's Voice Quadrilles, a musical work performed in London and in major U.S. cities, was well received and successful. His work New Cotillions and March was performed for General LaFayette, as America celebrated LaFayette's visit in 1824. A townsman in Philadelphia noted that nothing would be more natural than for a master such as Johnson to perform at the grand LaFayette Ball. This notoriety is a hint as to why Johnson's music was included in compilations alongside Beethoven, Bellini, Brahms, Burgmüller, Czerny, Donizetti and Weber. When his Philadelphia brass band toured England in 1838, Johnson was able to play for Queen Victoria. After playing for Queen Victoria, she presented him with a silver bugle.

Johnson successfully rivaled white musical organizations, receiving patronage from the public in spite of the considerable racial discrimination of the time. Available accounts show that his composition and playing must have had qualities which cannot be reconstructed from the surviving manuscripts. Historical accounts suggest that his performances infused stylistic rhythmic changes, differing from the written versions, which were either inferred by performers or instructed verbally. This is presumed to be similar to the improvisations made by jazz musicians today, although the current practices and idioms are probably vastly different from the ones used by Johnson. He was able to create interesting music, harmonies, and effects that differed from the diatonic harmonies and triadic melodies that were popular at that time.

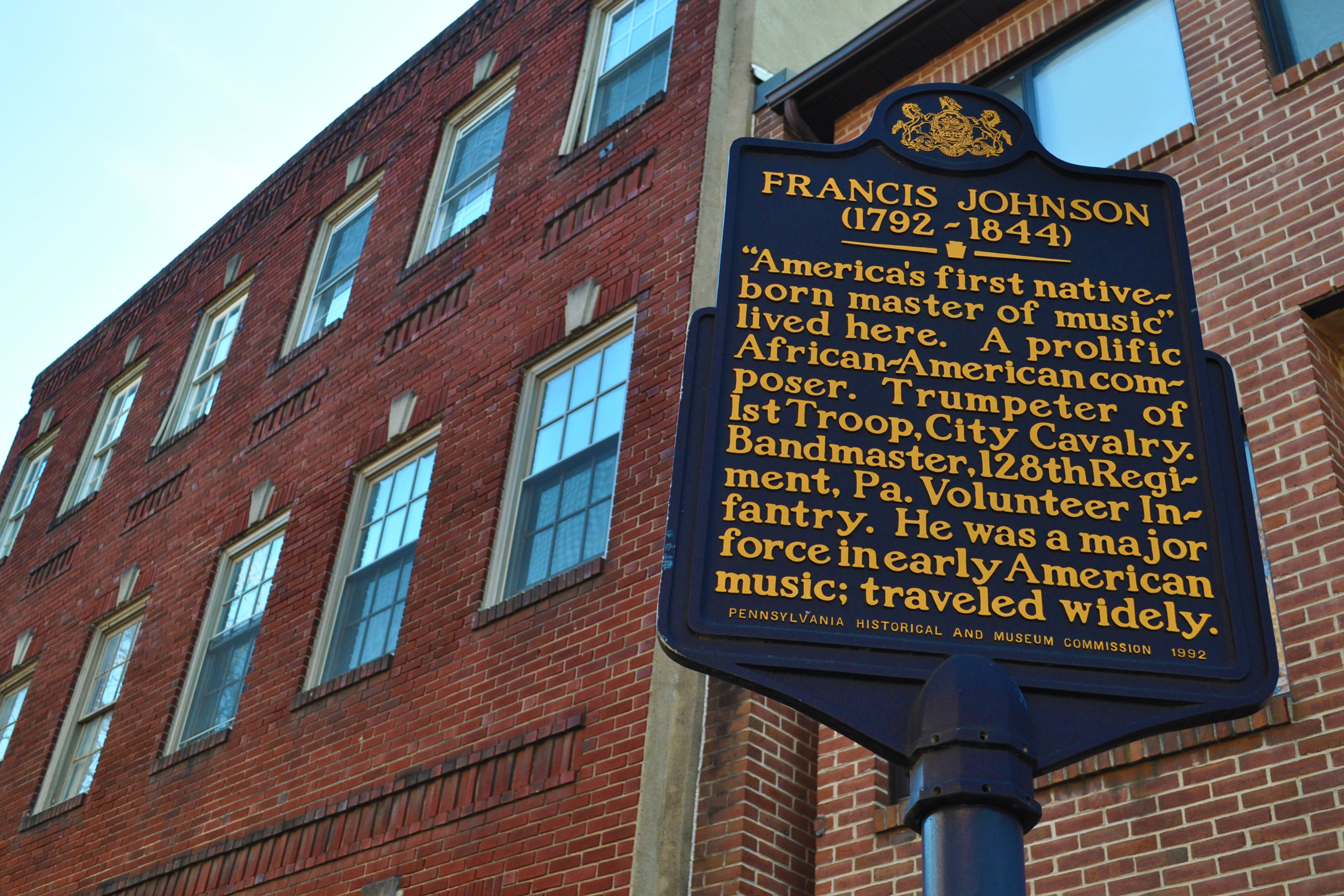
Francis Johnson Historical Marker, Philadelphia PA

Johnson also performed sacred music at black churches in Philadelphia, New York, and Boston. He staged a performance of Creation in March 1841 at the First African Presbyterian Church in Philadelphia, and later repeated the performance at a European-American church.

Johnson served as a teacher to wealthy European-American students, one of whom wrote that the teacher's studio walls were covered with images of instruments, various instruments could be found around the room, and shelves were laden with thousands of musical collections. The student noted that Johnson's spot for composing contained unfinished manuscripts, with pen and ink ready for use.

After Johnson's death, the Frank Johnson Orchestra continued to play under that name led by Joseph Anderson Sr. with music arrangements by Henry F. Williams.

== Music ==
=== Musical innovations ===
The Philadelphia Public Ledger newspaper reported that Johnson introduced the extended technique of singing while playing, which has become more common today as a way of providing wind instrumentalists a means of producing harmonies. The use of flute obbligato to imitate the chirping of canaries in his "Bird Waltz" was "so natural that the keenest perception cannot discover the difference." Composers Claude Debussy and Maurice Ravel may have been influenced by Johnson's techniques. The orchestral version of Ravel's "Ma Mère l'Oye" (Mother Goose) features a similar effect in the "Tom Thumb" movement, where flutes depict the chirping birds that steal the breadcrumb trail.

The work Philadelphia Fireman's Quadrille astounded audiences as Johnson's bugle was heard to "distinctly cry, 'Fire!' 'Fire!'" Johnson became associated with such dramatic effects, and imitations by his contemporaries were said to be far less effective. Program music became popular during this period, particularly works that depicted battle. Johnson arranged Frantisek Kotzwara's The Battle of Prague, impressing the audience with realistic effects. Johnson's New Railroad Gallop began with the sound of steam, continued with the sound of passengers entering the cars, then concluded with the sound of the train reaching full speed.

=== Musical style ===
Only reviews from newspaper critics, audience members and programs survive to tell of the sounds produced by Johnson. During this period, it was common to not write a complete score, since works were in such demand that this time-consuming task was best left as notes; the performers could more easily be taught to produce the desired sound. Arrangements were commonly published for amateurs in order to increase the demand for the original band or orchestra. Only surviving today are the piano arrangements requested by publishers, along with skeleton guides of Johnson's other arrangements. Johnson's elaborate and extended effects were apparently more important than his straightforward compositions. Foreshadowing the jazz era, his actual music was simple, allowing the composer to instruct the performers in developing more musically complex versions.
