= Albert Mando =

Musician, composer, and director

Albert Francis Mando (June 18, 1846 - October 10, 1912) was a musician in the United States. He was a composer, conductor, and educator. The New York Age profiled him in 1907.

Mando was born June 18, 1846, in Schaghticoke, New York, and lived there until he was nine years old when he moved with his family to Lansingburgh. He came to New York in 1868 where he studied violin under John Thomas Douglass and various other musical disciplines under various teachers. Over the years, he authored several musical compositions and conducted concerts in several large cities.

In 1883 he founded the Mando Mozart Conservatory of Music located in New York City, a classical music school for African Americans.
