= Schaghticoke, New York =

Schaghticoke
- Town
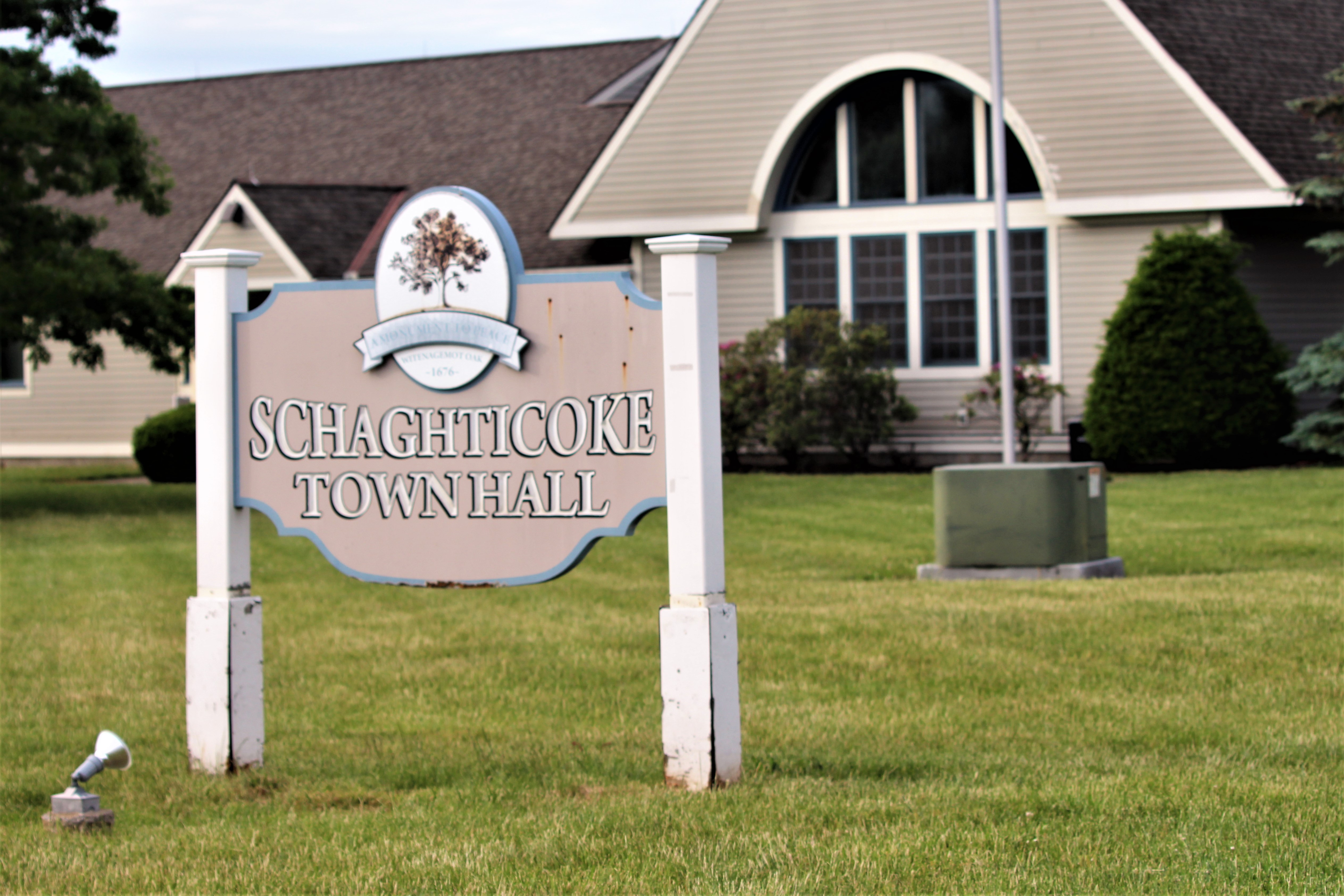
- Town hall

- Location in Rensselaer County and the state of New York.
- Coordinates: 42°52′50″N 73°36′35″W
- Country: United States
- State: New York
- County: Rensselaer
- Settled: 1668
- Incorporated: 1788

Government
  - Town Clerk: Jennifer Molesky

Area
  - Total: 51.86 sq mi (134.32 km^{2})
  - Land: 49.75 sq mi (128.85 km^{2})
  - Water: 2.12 sq mi (5.48 km^{2})
- Elevation: 377 ft (115 m)

Population (2020)
  - Total: 7,445
  - Density: 149.7/sq mi (57.78/km^{2})
- Time zone: UTC-5 (Eastern (EST))
  - Summer (DST): UTC-4 (EDT)
- ZIP code: 12154
- Area code: 518
- FIPS code: 36-65486
- GNIS feature ID: 0979467
- Website: Town of Schaghticoke, NY

Schaghticoke (/ˈskætɪkoʊk/ SKAT-ih-kohk) is a town in Rensselaer County, New York, United States. The population was 7,445 at the 2020 census. It was named for the Schaghticoke, a Native American tribe formed in the seventeenth century from an amalgamation of remnant peoples of eastern New York and New England. The tribe has one of the oldest reservations in the United States, located in what is now Litchfield County, Connecticut. It has been recognized by the state of Connecticut but has not yet achieved federal recognition.

The town is on the northern border of the county, north of Troy. The town contains a village, also called Schaghticoke, and part of the village of Valley Falls.

== History ==
This area was historically occupied by the Mohican tribe, and later by a mixed group of Mohicans, and remnants of numerous New England tribes who had migrated west seeking to escape European encroachment.

In 1675, Governor Andros, governor of the colony of New York, planted a tree of Welfare near the junction of the Hoosic River and Tomhannock Creek, an area already known as Schaghticoke, "the place where the waters mingle." This tree symbolized the friendship between the English and the Dutch, and the Schaghticoke Indians. The Native Inhabitants were Mohican refugees from New England welcomed to Schaghticoke because they agreed to help protect the English from the French and the Iroquois. They stayed until 1754.

Prior to the proclamation of colonial independence, Schaghticoke was part of the colony of New York with most of its citizens governed by the city of Albany, which owned the land they rented.

Originally, Schaghticoke was a dangerous place to live because they were frequently raided by the Tories. This led to the slow settlement of the Schaghticoke land. Once the land was fully settled it was a part of Albany County, until 1791 when Rensselaer County was formed.

After the revolution many immigrants came from England and Ireland to settle in Schaghticoke. The town flourished near the water powered mills created in the town on the Hoosic River. The town was mainly agricultural. There were many farmers residing in Schaghticoke who made crops for local industries.

The Knickerbocker Mansion was listed on the National Register of Historic Places in 1972.

As of the early decades of the 21st century, Schaghticoke still has a strong agricultural presence but is also characterized by increasing residential development, and contends with related political, social, and economic issues.

== Geography ==
According to the United States Census Bureau, the town has a total area of 51.9 square miles (134.3 km^{2}), of which 49.9 square miles (129.3 km^{2}) is land and 2.0 square miles (5.1 km^{2}) (3.76%) is water.

The northern town boundary is the border of Washington County, and the western town line, defined by the Hudson River, is the border of Saratoga County.

The Hoosic River flows through the town to the Hudson River at the western town line.

== Demographics ==
Historical population
Census	Pop.	Note	%±
1790	1,833		—
1800	2,355		28.5%
1810	2,492		5.8%
1820	2,522		1.2%
1830	3,002		19.0%
1840	3,389		12.9%
1850	3,290		−2.9%
1860	2,929		−11.0%
1870	3,125		6.7%
1880	3,591		14.9%
1890	3,059		−14.8%
1900	2,631		−14.0%
1910	2,780		5.7%
1920	2,177		−21.7%
1930	3,006		38.1%
1940	3,246		8.0%
1950	4,019		23.8%
1960	5,269		31.1%
1970	6,220		18.0%
1980	7,094		14.1%
1990	7,574		6.8%
2000	7,456		−1.6%
2010	7,679		3.0%
2020	7,445		−3.0%
U.S. Decennial Census

As of the census of 2000, there were 7,456 people, 2,714 households, and 2,103 families residing in the town. The population density was 149.4 inhabitants per square mile (57.7/km^{2}). There were 2,823 housing units at an average density of 56.6 per square mile (21.9/km^{2}). The racial makeup of the town was 97.57% White, 1.26% Black or African American, 0.17% Native American, 0.36% Asian, 0.13% from other races, and 0.50% from two or more races. Hispanic or Latino of any race were 0.66% of the population.

There were 2,714 households, out of which 35.8% had children under the age of 18 living with them, 64.2% were married couples living together, 8.7% had a female householder with no husband present, and 22.5% were non-families. 17.7% of all households were made up of individuals, and 8.1% had someone living alone who was 65 years of age or older. The average household size was 2.75 and the average family size was 3.12.

In the town, the population was spread out, with 26.3% under the age of 18, 6.5% from 18 to 24, 29.3% from 25 to 44, 25.5% from 45 to 64, and 12.5% who were 65 years of age or older. The median age was 38 years. For every 100 females, there were 98.7 males. For every 100 females age 18 and over, there were 95.3 males.

The median income for a household in the town was $48,393, and the median income for a family was $57,423. Males had a median income of $40,574 versus $27,078 for females. The per capita income for the town was $20,673. About 3.4% of families and 4.7% of the population were below the poverty line, including 4.0% of those under age 18 and 8.3% of those age 65 or over.

== Communities and locations in the town ==
- East Schaghticoke – A location south of Schaghticoke village.
- Grant Hollow – A hamlet northeast of Troy and Spiegletown on Route 40.
- Hemstreet Park – A location at the western town line at the Hudson River that is a suburb of Mechanicville.
- Melrose – A hamlet northeast of Grant Hollow on Route 40.
- Pleasantdale – A suburban community north of Troy.
- Reynolds – A hamlet in the western part of the town.
- Schaghticoke – A village.
- Schaghticoke Hill – A hamlet south of Schaghticoke village on Route 40.
- Speigletown – A hamlet northeast of Troy on Route 40.
- Valley Falls – A village, a small part of which is located in the town near Schaghticoke village.

== Notable residents ==
- Albert Francis Mando, musician
- Jack Barsky, German-American author, IT specialist and former sleeper agent of the KGB (until 2016)
- Kenny Shoemaker, Hall of Fame auto racing driver
