= Knickerbocker Mansion =

Historic house in New York, United States

- U.S. National Register of Historic Places
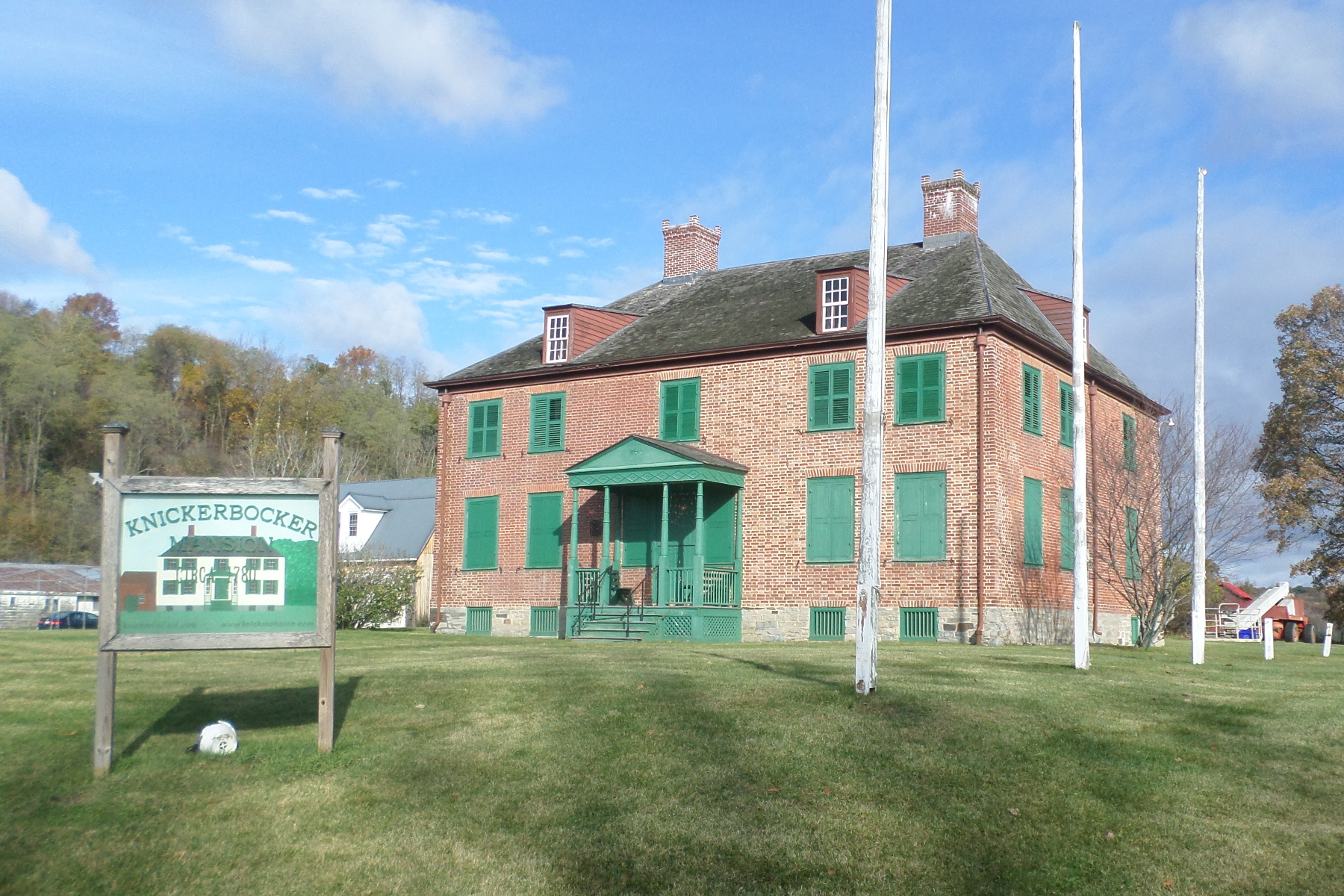
- Knickerbocker Mansion in 2016

- Location within New York Location within the United States
- Interactive map showing the location of Knickerbocker Mansion
- Location: Knickerbocker Rd., Schaghticoke, New York
- Coordinates: 42°54′18″N 73°39′8″W
- Area: 2.5 acres (1.0 ha)
- Built: 1770
- Architect: Knickerbocker, Johannes III
- NRHP reference No.: 72000906
- Added to NRHP: December 11, 1972

Knickerbocker Mansion is a historic home located at Schaghticoke in Rensselaer County, New York.

The property was occupied by the Knickerbocker family for nearly 250 years, from about 1707 until 1946. The mansion was built by Johannes Knickerbacker III around 1770. It was acquired in 1964 by the Knickerbocker Historical Society and is operated as a local history museum. The Knickerbocker Historical Society (KHS) have almost entirely restored the mansion.

The Knickerbocker Mansion grounds were the location of the “Witenagemot Oak,” planted in 1676 to commemorate the signing of a treaty between New York governor Edmund Andros and the local Mahican people and native refugees from King Philip's War. The oak stood until 1948.

The house was built about 1770 and is a 2 1/2-story, rectangular brick building. It has a hipped roof, covered in slate, that curves slightly at the eaves. The front facade once featured a one-bay, pedimented entrance portico.

It was listed on the National Register of Historic Places in 1972.
