= Kurt Schwaen =

German composer (1909–2007)

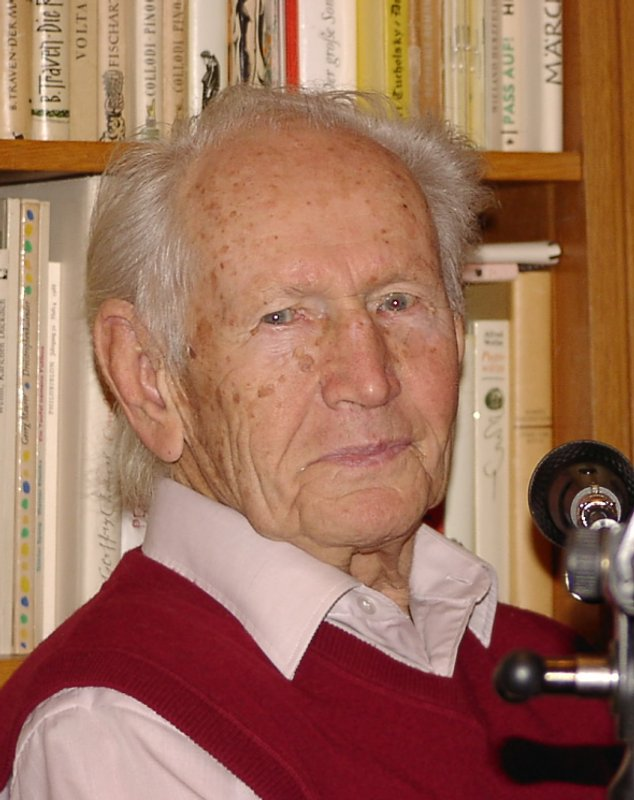
- Kurt Schwaen (2003)
- Born: June 21, 1909; Kattowitz, German Empire
- Died: October 9, 2007 (aged 98); Berlin, Germany
- Education: Royal Friedrich Wilhelm University of Berlin; University of Breslau; Marxist Workers' School
- Spouse: Ina Iske-Schwaen
- Website: http://www.kurtschwaen.de

Kurt Schwaen (June 21, 1909 in Katowice – October 9, 2007 in Berlin) was a German composer.

== Professional career ==
Schwaen studied piano, organ and composition under Fritz Lubrich. From 1929 to 1933 he studied at the universities of Berlin and Breslau, where his teachers included Curt Sachs and Arnold Schering. In 1930 he met Hanns Eisler who had a profound impact on his compositional style. After becoming active in an anti-fascist student group, he joined the Communist Party of Germany; from 1935 to 1938 he was imprisoned because of his political views.

After the war he returned to Berlin and spent much of his time working to rebuild the musical culture of that city by writing compositions for amateur music groups, choirs, music schools and chamber ensembles, publishing and serving as a musical advisor. Between 1953 and 1956 he worked with Bertolt Brecht who had a profound impact on his future compositions. He also worked with Ernst Busch. He composed in several genres, producing a cantata for children entitled King Midas. In 1961 he became a member of the DDR Akademie der Künste, where he was head of the music department from 1965 to 1970. From 1962 to 1978 he was president of the East German National Folk Music committee. Between 1973 and 1981 he directed the children's musical theatre in Leipzig. His awards include an honorary doctorate from Leipzig University (1983) and several state awards. Schwaen's extensive oeuvre comprises over 620 titles. A number of works, such as the Piano Concerto no.2 (1987), show the influence of his several visits to Vietnam. Later works include the collaborative musical poem Potsdamer Platz (1998). His works, such as König Midas, were published by the Friedrich Hofmeister Musikverlag.

Schwaen later settled in Berlin-Mahlsdorf, where he died at the age of 98. His widow, Ina Iske-Schwaen, maintains an archive dedicated to his works in his Mahlsdorf home.

== Musical works ==
=== Orchestral ===
- Sinfonietta KSV 142 (1957)
- Sinfonietta piccola KSV 374 (1974, rev. 1977)
- 3 Tanzsuiten (Nr.1 KSV 14, 1947, Nr.2 KSV 67, 1952, Nr.3 KSV 200, 1960)
- Ostinato 56 KSV 122 (1956)
- Jeu parti KSV 482 (1985)
- Piano Concerto no.1 KSV 259 (1963, rev. 1964)
- Piano Concerto no.2 "Vietnamesisches Konzert" KSV 515 (1987)
- Concert pour la jeunesse KSV 620 (1999)
- Violin Concerto KSV 433 (1979)
- Concerto for Clarinet, Trumpet and Orchestra KSV 174 (1959)

=== Operas ===
- Die Horatier und die Kuratier (children's opera) KSV 104 (1955/56)
- Pinocchios Abenteuer (children's opera), KSV 322 (1969/70, rev. 1997)
- Fetzers Flucht KSV 167 (1959)
- Leonce und Lena KSV 204 (1960/61)

=== Other ===
- König Midas (cantata) KSV 144 (1958)

=== Chamber music ===
- Volksliederstreichquartett KSV 143 (1958)
- Quartettino für Streichquartett KSV 615 (1998), rev. als Divertimento KSV 656 (2005)
- Piano Trio Nr.1 KSV 319 (1969)
- Piano Trio Nr.2 KSV 413 (1969/78)
- Piano Trio Nr.3 KSV 460 (1982)
- Piano Trio Nr.4 KSV 474 (1983)
- Piano Trio Nr.5 "en miniature" KSV 509 (1987)
- „Tänzerische Impressionen“ KSV 522 (1988)
- „Fern und nah. Neue Nationaltänze“ KSV 556,1 (1991)
- „Concertino. Hommage à Bartók“ für Violoncello und Klavier KSV 558 (1991)
- zahlreiche andere Werke für unterschiedliche Besetzungen

=== Piano music ===
- 5 Tanzbilder KSV 8 (1940)
- Movimenti KSV 457 (1957–82)
- Vietnamesische Impressionen KSV 546 (1990/91)
- Nocturne lugubre KSV 568 (1992)
- Nachlese KSV 638 (2002)
- Duo carattere KSV 601 (1997)

== Sources ==
- Rosemarie Groth. The New Grove Dictionary of Opera, edited by Stanley Sadie (1992), ISBN 0-333-73432-7 and ISBN 1-56159-228-5
- Ekkehard Ochs and Nico Schüler (Eds.): Festschrift Kurt Schwaen zum 85. Geburtstag. Frankfurt/M., New York: Peter Lang, 1995. ISBN 978-3631475522.
- Gesine Schröder: Volksnähe. Nähe zu welchem Volk? Paradoxien der frühen DDR-Musik, dargestellt am Beispiel von Kurt Schwaen, PDF (in German), 1,5 MB. In: Zeitschrift ästhetische Bildung 2015/1.
