= John F. Perry & Co. =

John F. Perry & Co. (c. 1875 - c. 1883) was a publisher of sheet music in Boston, Massachusetts in the mid-19th century.

== Images ==
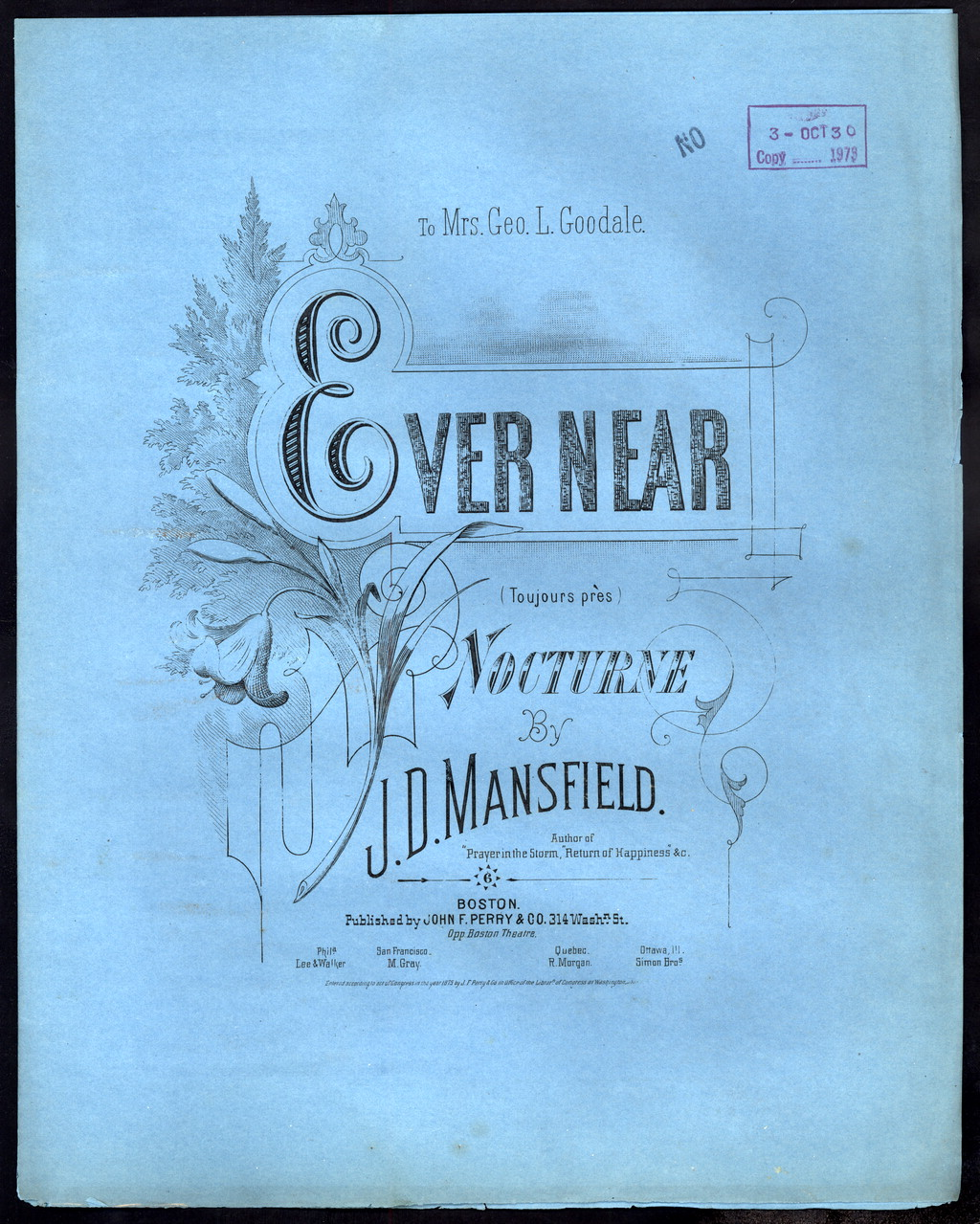
Ever Near by J.D. Mansfield, 1875 (Library of Congress)

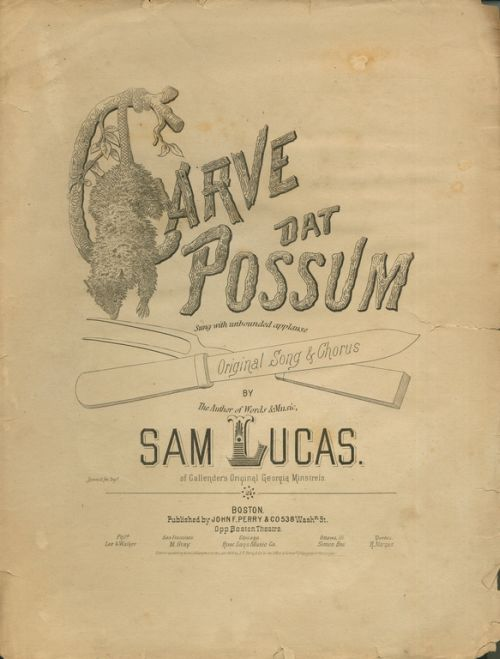
Carve dat Possum by Sam Lucas, 1875

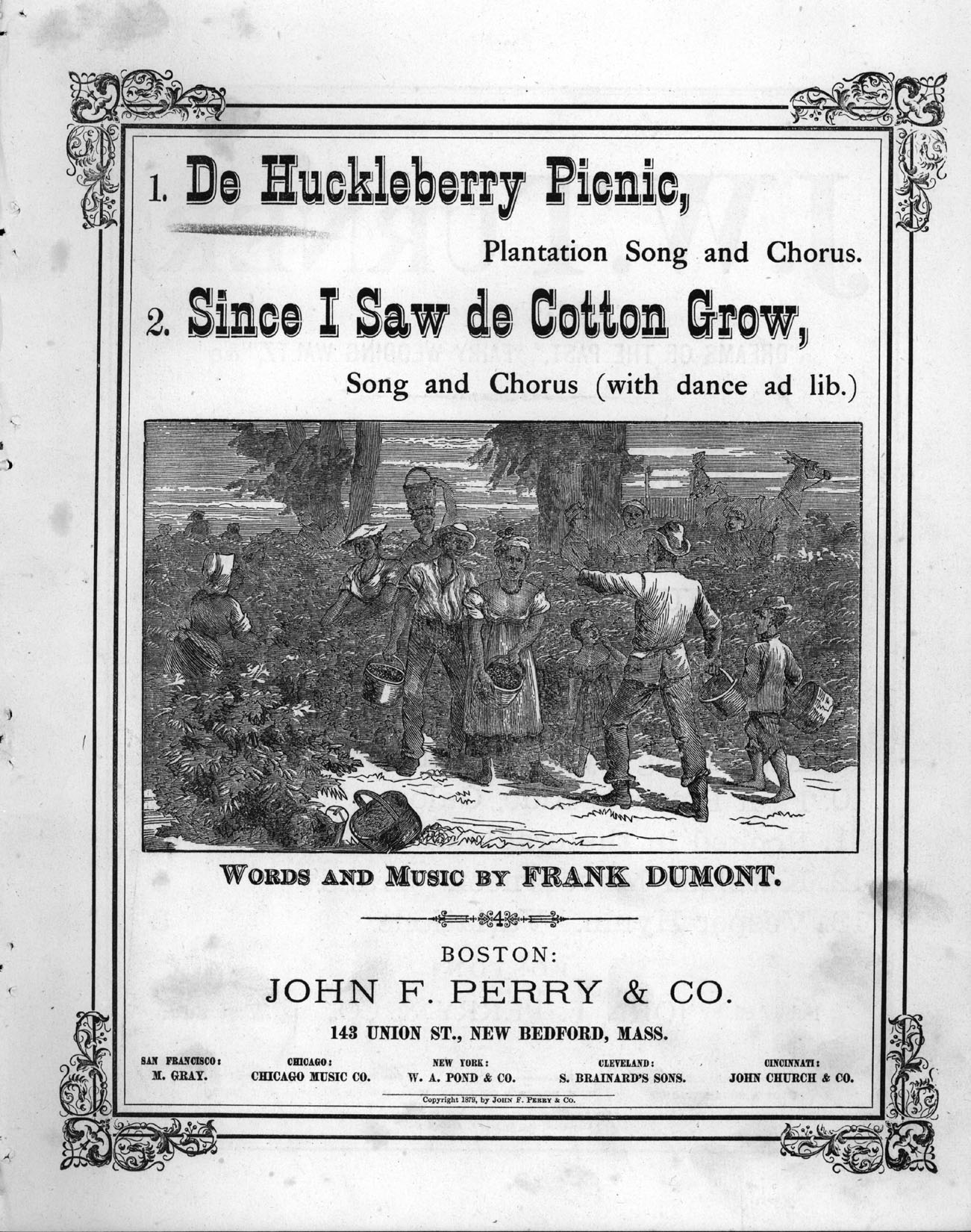
De Huckleberry Picnic by Frank Dumont, 1879 (Library of Congress)

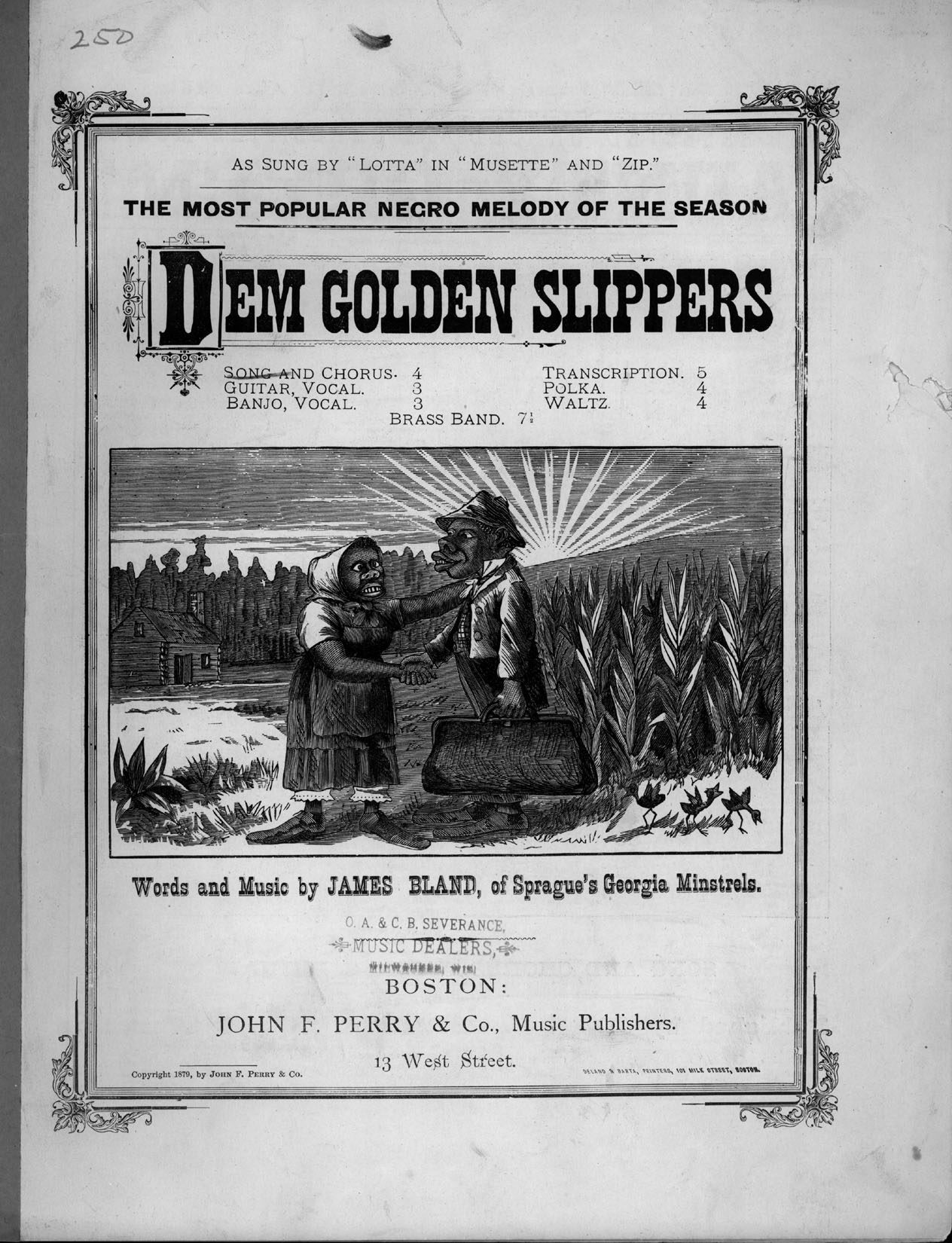
Dem Golden Slippers by James A. Bland "of Sprague's Georgia Minstrels," 1879 (Library of Congress)

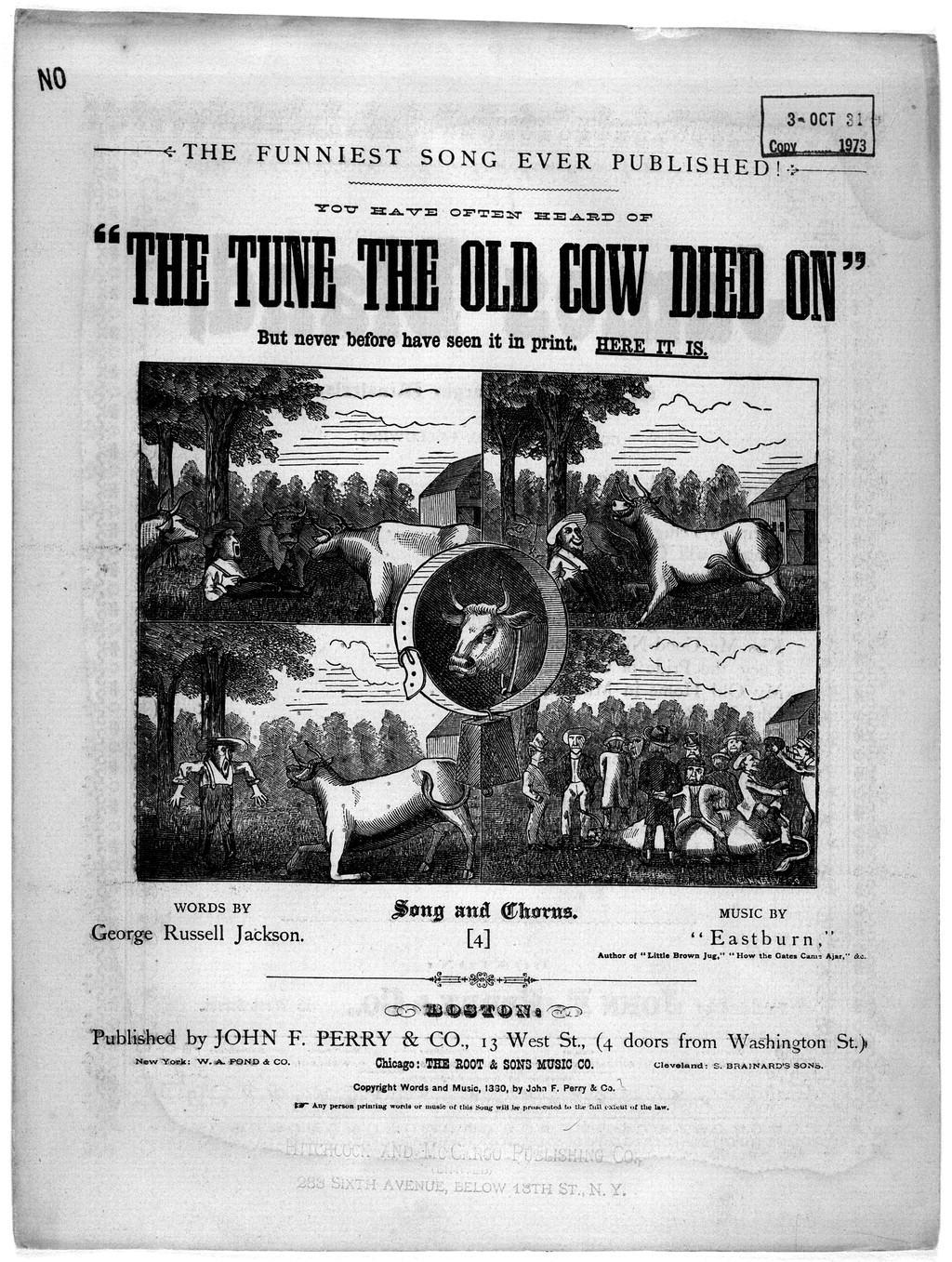
The Tune the Old Cow Died on by Eastburn, lyrics by George Russell Jackson, 1880 (Library of Congress)
