= Henry Hart (musician) =

American singer

Henry Hart (1839–1915) was an American composer, singer, and violinist. He led the Henry Hart Minstrels, was proclaimed a "social necessity" in Indianapolis, Indiana, and was the leader of a family musical group that Emma Lou Thornbrough called "the best-known group of colored entertainers in the state."

== Early years (1839–1866) ==
Henry Hart was born on June 8, 1839, in Frankfort, Kentucky. His father, Frederick Hart, was born at Fort Boonesborough, Kentucky, and his mother, Judith Brown, in Frankfort. One archival source of this parental information is Henry Hart's death certificate.

One nineteenth-century source of information about Hart's early years is an article in The Pacific Appeal, San Francisco, California, October 25, 1879. (The article is noted as copy from the Indianapolis News, but no date is given.)

The composer of some of the most popular plantation songs of the latter day negro minstrels well known in this city [Indianapolis] as Henry Hart, the colored violinist and Bee Line freight office messenger ... Henry Hart was born ... of free parents. In 1853 he left Frankfort and went to Cleveland. There he learned to play the violin, and was a member of Stanton's band of white musicians. In 1864 he left for New Orleans, playing his way down the river on one of the fine steamers. In that city he played for several months as first violinist in Prescott's Museum. He there married his wife, who was a professional pianist, and who played with him in various places in that city until 1867, when he removed to Evansville [Indiana].

The 1850 US Census for Franklin County, Kentucky, lists Frederick Hart, age 70, mulatto, and Judy Hart, 40, mulatto, and the 1860 US Census, Lorain County, Columbia Township, Elyria Post Office, June 1, 1860, lists Frederick Hart, 80, and Juda Hart, 40. (Perhaps "Juda Hart" was "Judy Hart", and there was a mistake regarding her age in the 1860 census.) These census records indicate that in 1860 the Hart family lived near Cleveland in Lorain County, and they imply that Henry Hart had moved to the Cleveland area in connection with his father's move. (Henry Hart's name is missing from the 1850 and 1860 censuses.)

The 1866 city directory of New Orleans lists Henry Hart as living at 98 Felicity Street. It seems likely that in 1866, the full name of Prescott's Museum, where Henry was a violinist, was Burnell & Prescott's Museum and Zoological Institute, as advertised in New Orleans newspapers.

Henry Hart's wife, Sarah F. Hart, was born September 6, 1849. According to her death certificate, she was born in Indiana to John Smith, birthplace unknown, and Angline Mason, born in Arkansas. (Other records indicate that the correct spelling is Angeline.)

== Evansville years (1867–1878) ==
During the years that Henry Hart resided in Evansville, his compositions were published. These are listed here with comments:

Those Charming Feet, song and dance, piano; Kunkel Brothers, St. Louis, Missouri, 1870

The composer's name is given as Henry Hart, and no name is given explicitly as author of the words, so that they may have been by Hart. The title page is headed by the name Billy Emerson with a large picture of Emerson. Beneath are titles of four songs, of which the fourth is "Those Charming Feet." Billy Emerson (1846-1892), born William Emerson Redmond in Belfast, Northern Ireland, was a minstrel song and dance performer, having made his New York debut in 1866, as noted in The New Grove Dictionary of American Music. "Those Charming Feet" can be downloaded from

American Sheet Music, Library of Congress.

My Thoughts Are of Thee, song and chorus, piano; Root & Cady, Chicago, 1871

The front cover indicates that the words are by Frank Manson Gilbert, as sung by Fred D. Goslee. Both Gilbert and Goslee were well known residents of Evansville. Indeed, Gilbert (1846-1916) was a humorist, local historian, editor, and in two cases, owner of Evansville newspapers. "My Thoughts Are of Thee" can be downloaded from

American Sheet Music, Library of Congress.

Idlewild Mazurka, piano solo; Root & Cady, Chicago, 1871

Dedicated to Capt. Gus Fowler. In 1874, Fowler was captain of the riverboat Robert Mitchell, owned by the Evansville and New Orleans Packet Co. The title refers to a location near Ligonier, Indiana, near the Ohio River. It became Idlewild Park in 1878. "Idlewild Mazurka" can be downloaded from American Sheet Music, Library of Congress.

Good Sweet Ham, song and chorus, piano; J. L. Peters, New York, 1873

The front cover indicates that both the words and melody are by Henry Hart, arranged by James E. Steward, as sung by George Wilson. Hart's words were formerly selected as an example of minstrel lyrics in The Learning Page (teacher resources), Library of Congress:

You may talk about good eating, Of your oysters and your chowdered clam, But it's when I'm awful hungry, Then just give me good old sweet ham; Now some folks may differ with me, But their talk 'tis nothing but a sham, For to touch this darkie's palate, Oh! Just give me good old sweet ham.

This piece is listed in 1873 in music and can be downloaded from American Sheet Music, Library of Congress.

On the Beautiful Lake Erie, three waltzes for piano; Balmer & Weber, St. Louis, 1873

These waltzes can be downloaded from American Sheet Music, Library of Congress.

7:30-11: Galop, piano; Balmer & Weber, St. Louis, 1873

Dedicated to John E. Martin, Esp., Sec'y of E&C R.R. The railroad was the Evansville and Crawfordsville, of which Martin later became president. This galop (a popular 19th century dance) can be downloaded from Google Books:

Gipsey Queen Waltzes, piano; Balmer & Weber, St. Louis, 1872

Dedicated to Miss Lizzie Hudnall of Salt Lake City. These two waltzes can be download from the University of Virginia:

The Evansville Favorite Waltz, piano; P. J. Dittoe, Evansville, 1874

It seems likely that this piece was performed at the opening of the St. George Hotel in Evansville, located on Locust Street near Henry Hart's barber shop. To quote Frank M. Gilbert,

The eventful night [Feb. 17, 1874] came and the new hotel which in those days was far ahead of anything that had been anticipated by the community, was ablaze with light ... The hotel was beautifully adorned with plants, etc., while in the large dining room the band of Henry Hart, a colored man who at that time was considered by our people to be the very king of music, was screened behind potted plants at the back end. The dance began at nine o'clock and lasted until daylight.

The inaugural ball at the St. George Hotel was possibly the most extravagant social event in the nineteenth-century history of the city of Evansville, as attested by coverage in the February 17 and 18 issues of The Evansville Journal. "The Evansville Favorite Waltz" can be downloaded from American Sheet Music, Library of Congress.

Daffney Do You Love Me, song and chorus, piano; White, Smith & Company, Boston, 1875

The words are by Sam Lucas, and the music was "sung with immense success by Sam Lucas of Callender's Original Georgia Minstrels." Lucas (1840-1916) was born in Washington, Ohio, where he became a barber and self-taught guitarist. He then spent many years in minstrel acts as a singer and actor. Southern writes that "Lucas was regarded by his contemporaries as the 'dean of the colored theatrical profession' and was called 'Dad'. "Daffney Do You Love Me" can be downloaded from American Sheet Music, Library of Congress.

Carve dat Possum, song and chorus, piano; John F. Perry & Co., Boston 1875

The cover states that the author of words and music was Sam Lucas. However, it appears that they were actually by Henry Hart. To understand what happened it is helpful to quote from the 1879 article in The Pacific Appeal:

In 1874 [Hart] organized a negro minstrel company, in which were some of the best artists in their line that were ever on the stage. Sam Lucas, ... , Jake Hamilton the banjoist, Brown and Mills ... were with him. They made one trip through Ohio, Illinois, Kentucky and Indiana, and then disbanded. It was during this season that Henry wrote his best songs, and they were first sung under his own leadership by his own singers. They were greeted with considerable applause and attracted some attention, especially among other minstrel singers ... Soon after the company disbanded, but long before the songs were published, Col. Wagner, Milt. Barlow, and other celebrated end men, had obtained copies from the composer, and sung them with great success throughout this country. "'Keahve dat' possum" was first sung by Sam Lucas. After he left the company he had it published in Boston by John F. Perry, and claimed it as his own, and it was only after a long epistolary discussion that Henry Hart obtained a public acknowledgement that he was the genuine author.

"Carve dat Possum" may have been Hart's best known melody. It is listed at Wikipedia in the 1875 article under Sam Lucas's name instead of Hart's. The song has been arranged and performed many times since 1875. It can be downloaded from American Sheet Music, Library of Congress.

The 1870 United States Census for Vanderburgh County, Indiana, shows that four members of the Hart family resided together. Aside from Henry and Sarah, there is Estela (correct spelling: Estella), age 4, born in Louisiana, and Archeline Selten (correct spelling: Angeline Selden), age 43, born in Indiana. The next household listed includes Moses Selden, age 61, born in Kentucky. Other records imply that Angeline was Sarah's mother; the relationship to Moses Selden is uncertain.

The 1870-71 Evansville City Directory shows that Henry Hart was a barber, with shop located at 25 Locust Street and residence on Oak Street between 7th and 8th Streets. The latter property matches a deed dated June 25, 1870, for real estate sold to Henry Hart for $1300.00. The card catalogs for Vanderburgh County Grantee Index of Deeds and Grantor Index of Deeds show that during the years 1870 to 1908 there were several property transactions in which individual grantors were Henry, Sarah, and Angeline.

In 1870, a daughter named Lillian was born to the Harts, but she did not survive infancy. Lillian was buried at Oak Hill Cemetery in a family lot which now includes Henry, Sarah, and several of their daughters, as well as Angeline Selden, who died in New Orleans in 1875. Moses Selden, who died in 1889, was buried elsewhere in the same cemetery.

Within nineteenth-century minstrelsy, there were white minstrels who used "burnt cork," but there were also African-American minstrels such as Henry Hart. As already noted, in 1874, Hart organized his own minstrel troupe and performed in four states. Here is what a reviewer wrote for The Kokomo Democrat:

Henry Hart's original colored minstrels gave the best entertainment of the kind last Friday night ever put on the boards in this city. Their representation of the Southern plantation negro's is without precedent. To the lovers of "burnt cork" everywhere we would say, there is nothing of vulgarity or low slang in the performances of this troupe to give offence to the most fastidious of refined society.

== Indianapolis years (1879–1915) ==
It appears that Henry Hart published no further compositions after moving his family to Indianapolis in 1878 or 1879. In the capital city, his musical and social skills led to his rise as a social musician. As his daughters were born, he, and probably also Sarah, taught them to play instruments.

In 1901, The Indianapolis News paid tribute to Hart in an article captioned "A Social Necessity." About half of the article is quoted here:

Any one in Indiana who has not danced to the fascinating measures of Henry Hart's violin has missed a treat. It's an open secret that when a dance is contemplated the first person visited in regard to arranging a date for it is Henry Hart. If there is an anniversary approaching, "Henry," as every one calls him, must be secured, and if it happens to be in the social season, say from the middle of September to the middle of February, or just after Easter, or in June, when the weddings begin to bloom ...

Mr. Hart alone is not all of "Henry Hart's music." He has a family of interesting daughters, and as they grow up to young womanhood, and even when quite small, they take their part in the orchestra. First, there were Myrtle and her father, with piano and violin. The harp is a fine instrument for dances, and it was decided that Myrtle must learn to play it. Several weeks in Chicago under a good master followed ...

Then Miss William [listed as Willie in census records] learned to play the piano [and 'cello]. Hazel was the next daughter. She learned the piano ... and became an expert on the smaller instruments, the trap drum, xylophone and bells. [Then] there is little Clothilde, who plays the drum. The combination of instruments played in the Hart family furnishes the best possible music for a dance. Mr. Hart adds a cornet, and sometimes a viola.

[Hart] is on the most friendly terms with the prominent people of the Hoosier capital. He played for Governors Williams, Porter and Mount, and for the inaugurals of Governors Gray and Hovey. He provided the music for the inaugural ball given by Governor Durbin, at Tomlinson Hall, in January. Hart was engaged for the opening receptions of the Columbia Club, the Country Club, the Commercial Club, the Canoe Club, the Propylaeum, the Brenneke Academy, the Americus Club and the University Club.

He was the musician to furnish music on the occasion of the visits of Presidents Rutherford B. Hayes, Grover Cleveland, and Benjamin Harrison. "It's pretty good honor to have played for three kings," said Henry ...

== Myrtle Hart ==
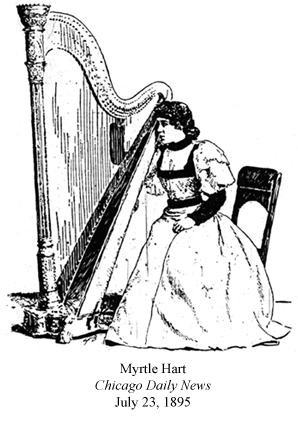

Myrtle Hart became a professional harpist. An article in The Indianapolis World describes her as "the only colored harpist in this country," in connection with her concert in Washington, D.C., at the Metropolitan A. M. E. Church.

Perhaps the most insightful account of Myrtle's fine harp is given her father's obituary in The Indianapolis News:

Hart's Orchestra, as it was called, was of stringed instruments and composed of members of his own family. In 1893, the year of the world's fair at Chicago, Hart sadly wanted a harp for one of his daughters ... There was such a harp on exhibit at the world's fair ... , a magnificent instrument, priced at nearly $1,000 ... The late Colonel Eli Lilly, informed of Hart's desire, bought the harp and gave him unlimited time in which to pay for it ... This addition to the orchestra made the Hart family aggregation more than ever in favor and it was not long before the debt was liquidated.

An earlier account from the Chicago Daily News is also informative:

... She came here with her father, Prof. Henry Hart, took part in a musical program at Quinn Chapel last night, and returned this evening to Wawasee, Ind., where she and her father and sister nightly furnish music for the entertainment of the guests at Wawasee Inn [built with the support of Col. Eli Lilly].

Miss Hart [was] born in Evansville and raised and educated in Indianapolis. [She had previously played in Chicago] in the British exhibit at the World's Fair and the costly instrument upon which she performed last night at Quinn chapel was exhibited by its manufactures in the Columbian exposition.

All the members of the family are musicians, and the father, Prof. Henry Hart, is one of the best-known colored violinists in the United States. Besides, he performs upon several other instruments, and was his daughter's first teacher on the harp ... Miss Hart came to Chicago and studied for three years under Edmund Schuecker [correct spelling Schuëcker], formerly professor of the harp at Leipzig, Germany, and is now harp soloist in Theodore Thomas' orchestra [which became the Chicago Symphony Orchestra).

A Daily News reporter found Miss Hart very approachable just before her rehearsal at Quinn chapel yesterday. She said, "I have been playing since my babyhood - almost. I play only by inspiration. I can do nothing unless inspired ... Miss Hart is a beautiful and accomplished young woman ... She is tall and very graceful, and her eyes dance with girlish merriment ..."

The Myrtle Hart Society was an Internet-based music research and educational resource committed to illuminating the historical and contemporary accomplishments of classical musicians of color.

== Hazel Hart Hendricks ==
Henry and Sarah Hart's daughter Hazel became a teacher in Indianapolis. In 1928 she became principal of school #37, and the 1930-31 Butler University Bulletin shows that she received a Bachelor of Arts Degree in Education. On Sept. 5, 1935, she led a group of twenty-four members of a "novelty band" from her school in a performance in the central auditorium in Frankfort, Indiana. The band was returning in a bus when an accident occurred. Hazel died the next morning. The Indianapolis Star described the accident and included a tribute by Daniel T. Weir, assistant superintendent of schools:

She was an accomplished musician ... The band ... is unique in that none of the instruments used are musical instruments. It was organized by her at the request of a few pupils of the school after they had demonstrated to her that they could produce good entertainment although the music might not be of the highest quality. It was the pleasure which it gave the children which led her to carry on this work. She always went with the band to its engagements and played the piano accompaniment for it while one of the youthful members wielded the baton and announced the numbers. Many will recall the pleasure they had in hearing and seeing this band in its numerous performances throughout this and neighboring cities ...

The school of which Hazel was principal was renamed the Hazel Hart Hendricks School. It was closed in 2008.
