= Henry F. Williams =

American musician and composer

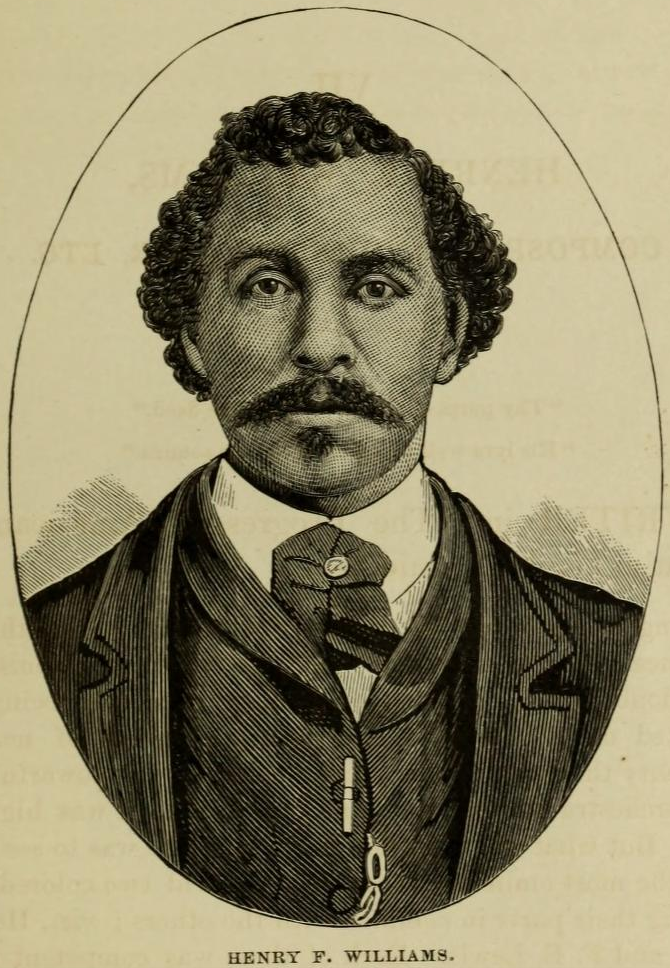
- Image of Williams from 1887
- Born: August 13, 1813; Boston, Massachusetts, U.S.
- Died: c. 1903 (aged 89–90); Boston, Massachusetts, U.S.
- Education: New England Conservatory of Music
- Occupations: Musician, educator

Henry F. Williams (August 13, 1813 – c. 1903) was a musician and composer in Boston, Massachusetts, in the late 19th century. He was one of two black musicians to play in the orchestra at the 1872 National Peace Jubilee. His arrangements received widespread popularity. Later in his life he was primarily a music teacher. Williams has been called the second best known black composer of his time after Frank Johnson, with whom he worked.

== Early life ==
Henry (Harry) F. Williams was born in Boston, Massachusetts, on August 13, 1813. He began to study music at the age of seven. As a young man, he studied with Peter Albrecht von Hagen Jr. and, until the age of 21 along with Alfred Howard and Henry Thacker. He was later a graduate of the New England Conservatory of Music in Boston, which opened its doors in 1867. In the early 1840s, he ran a music studio in Boston.

== Career ==
Williams primarily played the violin, double bass, and cornet, favoring the violin and cornet, but he also played the violoncello, baritone trombone, piano-forte, trombone, and tuba. On most of these instruments he also taught. He was also a noted composer and arranger of music. His Thanksgiving anthem, O Give Thanks, was seen by some in Boston as beyond the ability for a black person to compose. Music educator, Lowell Mason, was among those who held this belief but was eventually convinced. He was invited to travel to Liberia by Mason to perform there to gain recognition he was not accorded in the United States, but refused.

He was connected with Francis Johnson's Band in Philadelphia, arranging music for the band after Johnson's death in 1844 when Joseph Anderson Sr. led the group.

Williams frequently arranged music for Patrick Sarsfield Gilmore's Band. Williams on the double bass and Frederick E. Lewis on violin were the only black members of the grand orchestra consisting of two thousand musicians at the National Peace Jubilee in Boston in 1872 at the close of the Franco-Prussian War. They were examined by organizers J. Thomas Baldwin and Gilmore. Williams included performance on the double bass Richard Wagner's Tannhäuser and the William Tell Overture.

He also worked with the Boston Cadet Band, arranging a quickstep for the group and he wrote an overture for the Park Theatre Orchestra. In 1880, Williams joined J. H. Haverly's colored minstrels in Portsmouth Later in the 1880s, he moved to Illinois, where he became dean of the Illinois College of Music After 1888 he moved to Boston and was still writing music, although suffering from rheumatic pain. He may have been living at the Boston Almshouse and Hospital in 1900.

== Noted works ==
A number of arrangements received wide acclaim. The ballad "Lauriette", published in 1840, was one of his first pieces that was widely sold. The song is sentimental and simple. Parisien Waltzes, published in 1854, was a noted set of five numbers and also did well. This piece is, perhaps, his best known work and was republished in 1867. He also published a religious anthem ("O, Give Thanks"), a number of polka-redowas, mazurkas, quadrilles, overtures, ballads, and marches.

=== List of compositions ===
- Lauriette (1840)
- Come, Love, and List Awhile (1842)
- Croton Waltz (1844)
- O Give Thanks (c1846)
- Sunny Side Polka (1852)
- Campanello Polka (1852)
- Rose Schottische (1852)
- Climax polka (1853)
- Chitarra Polka (1853)
- Parisien Waltzes (1854)
- It was by Chance we Met (1866)
- I Would I had Never met Thee (The Coquette) (1876)
- Keep Me Near to Thee (1884)
- Safe in Christ (1884)
- Pass Back the Light (1884)
