= Hyers Sisters =

Black musical theater pioneers

Hyers Sisters Anna Madah Hyers Emma Louise Hyers
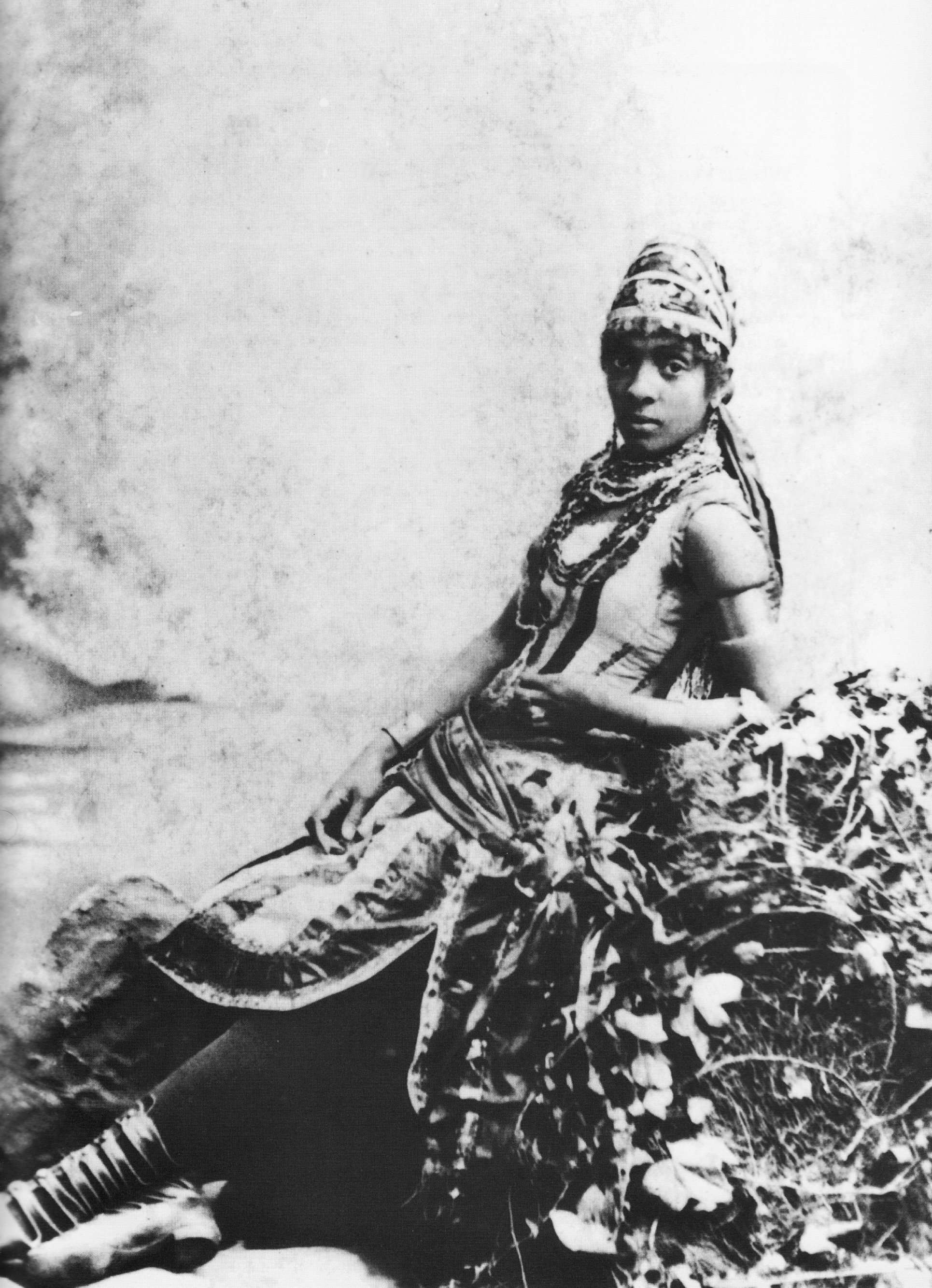
- Anna Madah Hyers dressed as "Urlina" in the opera Urlina the African Princess (1879)

Background information
- Genres: Black musical theater.
- Years active: 1867–1920s

The Hyers Sisters, Anna Madah (ca. 1855 – 1929) and Emma Louise (ca. 1857 – 1901), were singers and pioneers of black musical theater. With Joseph Bradford and Pauline Hopkins, the Hyers Sisters produced the "first full-fledged musical plays... in which African Americans themselves comment on the plight of the slaves and the relief of Emancipation without the disguises of minstrel comedy." Their first play was Out of Bondage (also known as Out of the Wilderness).

== Life ==
Their father, Samuel B. Hyers, came west to Sacramento, California, with their mother, Annie E. Hyers (née Cryer), after the Gold Rush. He made sure his daughters received both piano lessons and vocal training with German professor Hugo Sank and later opera singer Josephine D'Ormy and they performed for private parties before making their professional stage debut on April 22, 1867 at Sacramento’s Metropolitan Theater. Anna was a soprano and Emma a contralto. Under their father’s management, they embarked on their first transcontinental tour in 1871. On August 12, 1871, they performed in Salt Lake City to much acclaim.

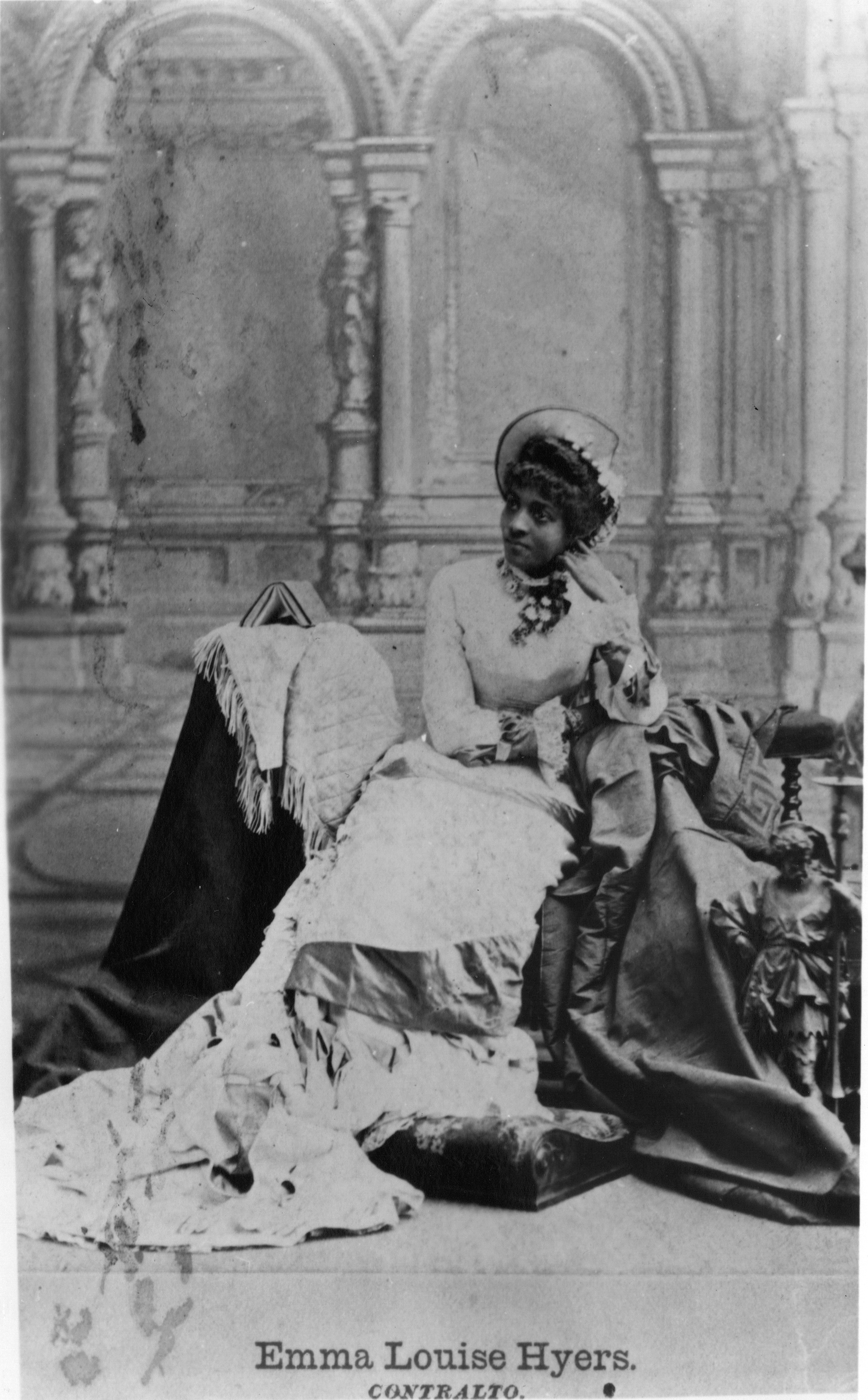
Emma Louise Hyers

They were later called "a rare musical treat" by the Daily \Herald of Saint Joseph, Missouri, and earned equal praise in Chicago, Cleveland, and New York City. Their tour reached Worcester and Springfield, Massachusetts, as well as New Haven and Providence. They visited Boston, which was known to be extremely critical of new acts, and were also well-received, performing in the 1872 World Peace Jubilee which was one of, if not, the first integrated major musical production in the country.

The Hyers’ family organized a theater company, where they produced musical dramas starring Anna and Emma, including Out of Bondage, written by Joseph Bradford and premiered in 1876, Urlina, the African Princess written by E. S. Getchell and premiered in 1879, The Underground Railway, by Pauline Hopkins in July 1880, and Hopkins' stage version of Uncle Tom’s Cabin in March 1880. Additionally, they performed Colored Aristocracy by Hopkins. Overall, they had at least six shows between the late 1870s and 1880s. They set the path for black musical theater and performance in the years that followed. They traveled until the mid-1880s with their own shows and continued to appear on stage into the 1890s. Though Emma Louise had died, in 1901, Anna Madah continued to travel with a show of John Isham.

The sisters collaborated, and often toured, with a number of African American musicians, including singers Wallace King and John Luca; composer and violinist John Thomas Douglass; as well as pianists Alexander C. Taylor, and Jacob J. Sawyer.

== Sources ==
- Engle, Ron; Miller, Tice L. (1993-05-06). The American Stage. Cambridge University Press. ISBN 9780521412384.
- Buckner, Jocelyn L. (Fall 2012). ""Spectacular Opacities": The Hyers Sisters' Performances of Respectability and Resistance". African American Review. 45 (3): 309–323. doi:10.1353/afa.2012.0044. S2CID 152800374.
- "The Hyers Sisters". susheel-bibbs.
