= Mellonee Burnim =

American ethnomusicologist (b. 1950)

- Born: Mellonee Victoria Burnim; 1950 (age 75–76)

Academic background
- Education: North Texas State University University of Wisconsin-Madison Indiana University Bloomington

Academic work
- Discipline: Ethnomusicology
- Sub-discipline: African American music
- Institutions: Indiana University

Mellonee Victoria Burnim (born 1950) is an American ethnomusicologist. A professor emerita at Indiana University Bloomington who specializes in African American gospel music, she previously served as director of the university's Archives of African American Music and Culture.

== Early life and education ==
Burnim grew up in rural Teague, Texas in the 1950s and 1960s. She attended all-Black schools and churches, where she sang gospel music. By the age of 12, Burnim was the pianist for three different church choirs in her community.

Burnim attended North Texas State University, majoring in music education with a concentration in piano. During her studies, she continued to play piano for a Black Baptist church choir on Sundays. Burnim went on to complete a master's degree at the University of Wisconsin-Madison, with a thesis on songs in Mende folktales.

Burnim was recruited to Indiana University Bloomington to complete her PhD and to found the university's African Choral Ensemble in 1976. She earned her doctorate in ethnomusicology in 1980, with a dissertation titled The Black Gospel Music Tradition: Symbol of Ethnicity.

== Career ==
Following her graduation, Burnim continued at Indiana University, joining the faculty of the Department of Afro-American Studies (now the Department of African American and African Diaspora Studies). She went on to chair the department. She transferred to the Department of Folklore and Ethnomusicology in 1999. She served as director of the Archives of African American Music and Culture from 2014 to 2016. As of 2017, Burnim holds professor emerita status.

Burnim is recognized as a pioneer and expert in the study of African American gospel music. She was a "prolific" researcher who published and lectured widely on the history and practice of Black religious music.

Burnim co-edited two textbooks with her Indiana University colleague Portia K. Maultsby: African American Music: An Introduction (2006) and Issues in African American Music: Power, Gender, Race, Representation (2016). A collection of Burnim's papers and audiovisual materials can be found in the Indiana University archives.

== Selected works ==
=== Books ===
- African American Music: An Introduction (co-edited with Portia K. Maultsby), 2006; ISBN 9781317934431
- Issues in African American Music: Power, Gender, Race, Representation (co-edited with Portia K. Maultsby), 2016; ISBN 9781315472072

=== Journal articles ===
- Burnim, Mellonee (1980). "Gospel music research". Black Music Research Journal. 1: 63–70. doi:10.2307/779294. JSTOR 779294.
- Burnim, Mellonee (1983). "Gospel music: Review of the literature". Music Educators Journal. 69 (9): 58–61. doi:10.2307/3396274. ISSN 0027-4321. JSTOR 3396274. S2CID 194025688.
- Burnim, Mellonee (1985). "Culture bearer and tradition bearer: An ethnomusicologist's research on gospel music". Ethnomusicology. 29 (3): 432–447. doi:10.2307/851798. JSTOR 851798.

=== Book chapters ===
- Burnim, Mellonee V.; Maultsby, Portia K. (1987). "From backwoods to city streets: The Afro-American musical journey". In Gay, Geneva; Baber, Willie L. (eds.). Expressively Black: The Cultural Basis of Ethnic Identity. Praeger. pp. 109–136. ISBN 0-275-92465-3. OCLC 925039627.
- Burnim, Mellonee (2013). "Tropes of continuity and disjuncture in the globalization of gospel music". In Dueck, Jonathan; Reily, Suzel Ana (eds.). The Oxford Handbook of Music and World Christianities. pp. 469–486. doi:10.1093/oxfordhb/9780199859993.013.16. ISBN 9780199859993.
