= Portia K. Maultsby =

American ethnomusicologist, educator (b. 1947)

Portia Katrenia Maultsby
- Born: June 11, 1947 (age 79); Orlando, Florida, U.S.
- Title: Professor emerita

Academic background
- Education: University of Wisconsin, Madison

Academic work
- Discipline: Ethnomusicology
- Sub-discipline: African American music
- Institutions: Indiana University

Portia Katrenia Maultsby (born June 21, 1947) is an American ethnomusicologist and educator. She is a professor emerita at Indiana University Bloomington and specializes in African-American music. She founded the university's Archives of African American Music and Culture in 1991.

== Biography ==
=== Early life and education ===
Maultsby was born in Orlando, Florida, to Maxie C. and Valdee Maultsby (later Maultsby-Williams), and grew up in the segregated American South. Her older brother was psychiatrist Maxie C. Maultsby, Jr. (1932–2016). She also had a twin brother, Casel Hayes Maultsby (1947–1988), a pilot.

Maultsby graduated from Jones High School in Orlando in 1964. She attended Mount St Scholastica College (now Benedictine College) in Atchison, Kansas, on a music scholarship, graduating in 1968 with a bachelor's degree in piano, theory, and composition. The following year, she earned a master's degree in musicology from the University of Wisconsin-Madison. In 1974, she was awarded a PhD in ethnomusicology from the University of Wisconsin-Madison; she was the first African American to be awarded that degree in the United States.

=== Career ===
Maultsby began lecturing at Indiana University in 1971, while still a graduate student. She was recruited by Dr. Herman Hudson and became the founding director of the Indiana University Soul Revue, a student ensemble dedicated to Black music. By 1975, she was an assistant professor in the Department of African-American Studies. In 1977 Maultsby produced a song called "Music is Just a Party" for her ensemble. This song would be selected as Billboard's top single in the First-Time-Around category. She went on to become chair of the department (1985–91), then professor in the Department of Folklore and Ethnomusicology (from 1992).

Maultsby's specialization in African-American music spans genres, including funk, soul, rhythm and blues, and spirituals. She founded the university's Archives of African American Music and Culture in 1991, and served as its director from 1991 through 2013. The archives started as Maultsby's personal collection and grew to include more than 10,000 pieces of music and music-related items (including interviews, photographs, and recordings) by 2003.

Maultsby co-edited two textbooks with her Indiana University colleague Mellonee V. Burnim: African American Music: An Introduction (2006) and Issues in African American Music: Power, Gender, Race, Representation (2016). She wrote the foreword to the 2018 book Black Lives Matter and Music: Protest, Intervention, Reflection, edited by Fernando Orejuela and Stephanie Shonekan.

In 2011, Maultsby received an award from National Association for the Study and Performance of African American Music. Maultsby has also served as a consultant for museums (including serving as a senior scholar at the Smithsonian Institution in 1985) and as a researcher documentary films (including the PBS documentary series Eyes on the Prize). She has consulted on various different projects such as The Motown Sound, Wade in the Water, and Chicago’s Record Row: The Cradle of Rhythm and Blues.

== Selected works ==
=== Books ===
- African American Music: An Introduction (co-edited with Mellonee V. Burnim), 2006. ISBN 9781317934431
- Issues in African American Music: Power, Gender, Race, Representation (co-edited with Mellonee V. Burnim), 2016. ISBN 9781315472072

=== Book chapters ===
- Maultsby, Portia K. (1992). "The impact of gospel music on the secular music industry". In Reagon, Bernice Johnson (ed.). We'll Understand It Better By and By: Pioneering African American Gospel Composers. Washington, DC: Smithsonian Institution Scholarly Press. pp. 19–33.
- Maultsby, Portia K. (2018). "Foreword". In Orejuela, Fernando; Shonekan, Stephanie (eds.). Black Lives Matter & Music: Protest, Intervention, Reflection. Bloomington, IN: Indiana University Press. pp. ix–xiv. ISBN 978-0-253-03843-2. OCLC 1062301971.

=== Articles ===
- Maultsby, Portia K. (1975). "Music of Northern Independent Black Churches during the Ante-Bellum Period". Ethnomusicology. 19 (3): 401–420. doi:10.2307/850793. JSTOR 850793.
- Maultsby, Portia K. (1976). "Black spirituals: An analysis of textual forms and structures". The Black Perspective in Music. 4 (1): 54–69. doi:10.2307/1214403. JSTOR 1214403.
- Maultsby, Portia K. (1983). "The use and performance of hymnody, spirituals, and gospels in the Black church". The Western Journal of Black Studies. 7 (3): 161–171.
- Maultsby, Portia K. (1983). "Soul music: Its sociological and political significance in American popular culture". The Journal of Popular Culture. 17 (2): 51–60. doi:10.1111/j.0022-3840.1983.1702_51.x.
