= Sam Lucas =

American entertainer (d. 1916)

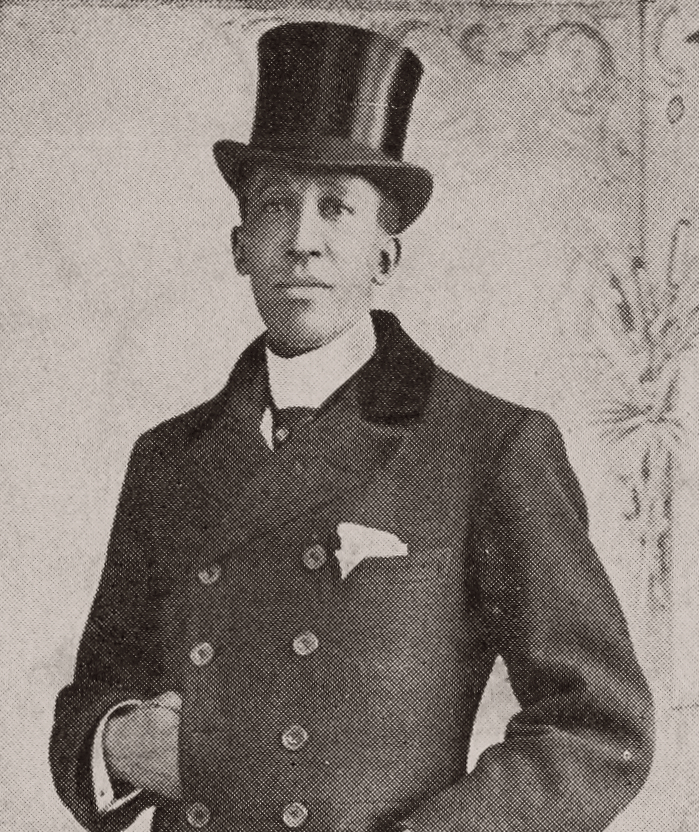
1901 portrait of Lucas

Sam Lucas (August 7, 1840 – January 10, 1916) was an American actor, comedian, singer and songwriter. His birth year has also been reported as 1839, 1841, 1848 and 1850.

Lucas' career began in blackface minstrelsy, but he later became one of the first African Americans to branch out into more serious drama, with roles in seminal works such as The Creole Show and A Trip to Coontown. He was the first black man to portray the role of Uncle Tom on both stage and screen. James Weldon Johnson described him as the "Grand Old Man of the Negro Stage". He was vocal about liberating himself from the minstrel profession and was the only composer of spirituals in his time to present them consistently within the context of jubilee concerts.

== Early career ==
Lucas was born Samuel Mildmay Lucas (or Samuel Lucas Milady) in Washington Court House, Ohio to free black parents. He showed a talent for guitar and singing as a teenager. While working as a barber, his local performances gained him a positive reputation.

In 1858 he began his career as a performer with the traveling African-American minstrel companies. Over the next five years, he sang and acted on stage and riverboats, and composed music for his shows. Meanwhile, he found ways to integrate his African-American roots into the mostly white form; for instance, his tune "Carve Dat Possum" borrowed its melody from a black religious song, although Henry Hart (musician) may have been the source. As black minstrelsy grew popular with the general public, Lucas became one of its first celebrities, particularly known for his portrayals of pitiable, comic characters.

His fame allowed him to choose his engagements and he performed with some of the best black minstrel troupes, never as leader, including Lew Johnson's Plantation Minstrels (1871–73), Callender's Georgia Minstrels (1873–74, 1875–76) and Sprague's Georgia Minstrels (1878–79) in Havana, Cuba. After his time as a minstrel performer, he began to work vaudeville.

As a writer and performer of jubilee songs, Lucas was unique in branding himself a "jubilee singer" and in forming a jubilee group in 1881 to highlight the popular songs of black composers, as well as his own character songs. His jubilee troupe never performed jubilee songs in the original sense of arranged traditional spirituals. Instead, he mixed commercial spirituals, cultivated songs, instrumental selections and comedy, forging a new kind of concert that was part variety, part band concert and part art music. Besides his own ensemble, "Mr. Sam Lucas and quartet", he was involved with numerous other jubilee ensembles such as the Norfolk Jubilee Singers, the Harper's Ferry Jubilee Singers, the Original Nashville Singers, the Southern Jubilee Singers and the Hyers Sisters, among others.

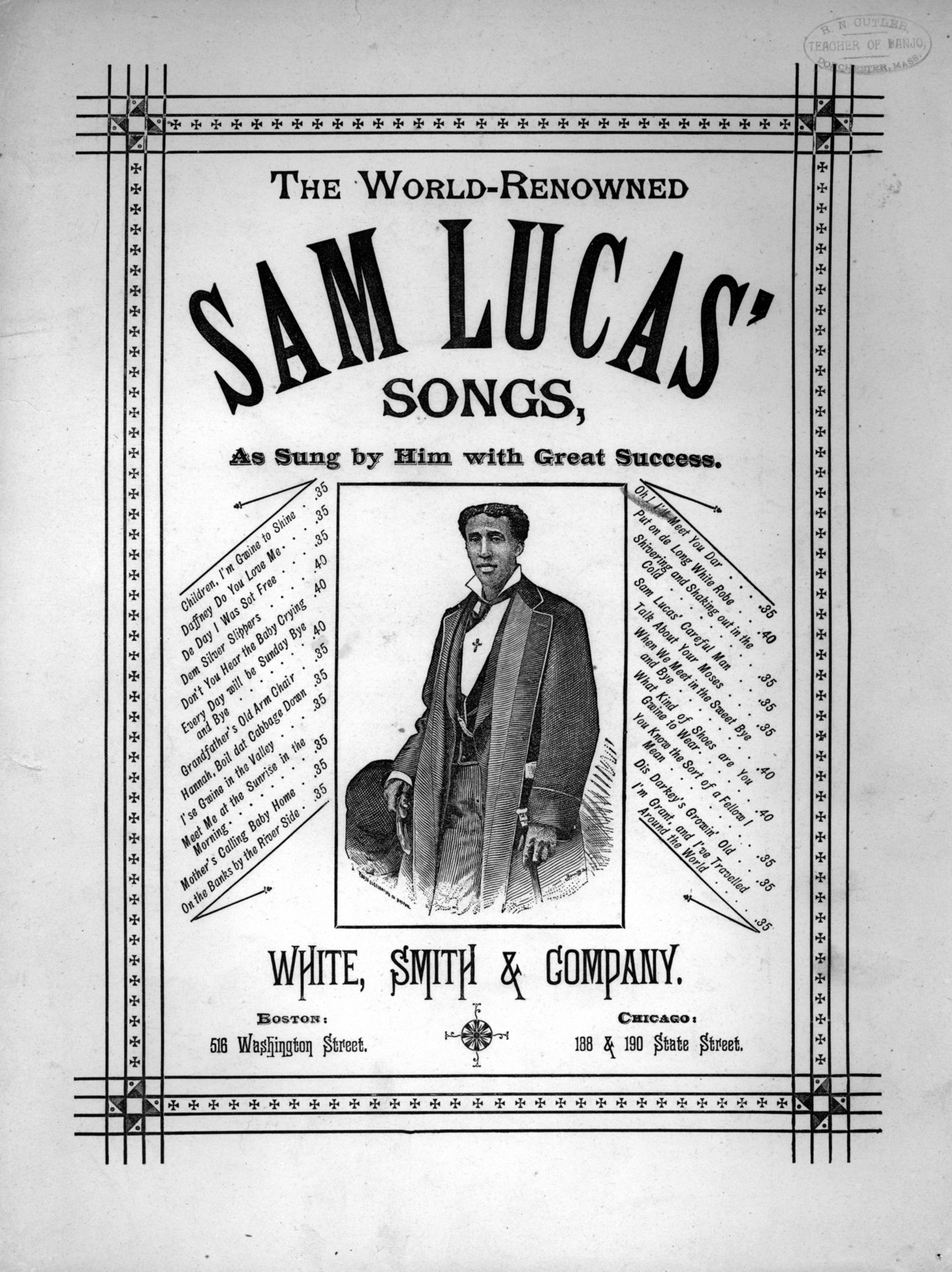
Cover for Sam Lucas' Songs

== Dramatic roles ==
Meanwhile, Lucas attempted to branch out into non-minstrel material. In 1875, for instance, he performed alongside Emma and Anna Hyers in Out of Bondage, a musical drama about a freed slave who is made over to fit into upper-class, white society. He followed this by another stint in black minstrelsy and, in 1876, was playing with Sprague's Georgia Minstrels, alongside both James A. Bland and Billy Kersands.

In 1878, Charles and Gustave Frohman needed an advertising gimmick to help rescue a poorly performing comedy troupe. Their answer was to stage a serious production of Uncle Tom's Cabin with a black man in the lead role. Lucas's reputation as an actor was well known, as was his wealth. Gustave wired Charles: "Get me an Eva and send her down with Sam Lucas. Be sure to tell Sam to bring his diamonds."

Lucas became the first USA born African American to play Uncle Tom in a serious production in the US, sometime after July 1878 (John W. Frick, Uncle Tom's Cabin on the American Stage and Screen, 121.) He was preceded by the Melbourne, Australia, production on June 8, 1878 ( Melbourne Argus, June 8, 1878) featuring USA born Hosea Easton. West Indian born Hackett Coulthurst had performed it earlier still, in Australia at Ballarat's Theatre Royal (Ballarat Star, June 12, 1867). Lucas's show fared poorly in Richmond, Virginia, and not even a change of venue to Lucas's home state of Ohio could save the production. The problems seem to have been many. One critic remarked that "little" Eva was so large that she nearly flattened St. Clair when she sat in his lap. Lucas had to hock his stash of diamonds to pay the troupe's transport back to Cincinnati.

Lucas rejoined the Hyers Sisters for The Underground Railroad, only to go back to blackface acts after its run. He also continued to write. Much of this output shows a more African American perspective when compared to work of other black composers, such as James Bland. For example, the lyrics to "My Dear Old Southern Home" say:

I remember now my poor wife's face,
Her cries ring in my ear;
When they tore me from her wild embrace,
And sold me way out yere.
My children sobbed about my knees,
They've all grown up since then,
But bress de Lord de good time's come;
I'se freed by dose Northern men.

Another Lucas tune declares: "I nebber shall forget, no nebber, / De day I was sot free."

== Later career ==
In 1890, Lucas served as an endman in Sam T. Jack's The Creole Show, often cited as the first African American production to show signs of breaking the links to minstrelsy. He married during its run, before he and his wife played a succession of variety houses, vaudeville stages and museums. In 1898, he performed in Boston in A Trip to Coontown, produced by Bob Cole. This was the first black production to use only African American writers, directors and producers, and the first black musical comedy to make a complete break with minstrelsy.

From 1905 to 1906, he starred in Rufus Rastus, which was directed by Ernest Hogan. In 1907, Lucas starred in the second showing of an original musical comedy from Cole and Johnson, The Shoe-Fly Regiment, which ran from June 3, 1907, to August 17, 1907. This production showed at the Grand Opera House in New York City from June 6–8, 1907 and at the Bijou Theatre, which was also located in New York, from August 6 to 17, 1907. The Shoe-Fly Regiment was a three-act musical, with Acts One and Three taking place in the Lincolnville Institute in Alabama and act two taking place in the Philippines. Lucas played Brother Doolittle, who was a member of the Bode of Education.

Lucas later performed in another original musical comedy The Red Moon, portraying Bill Webster, a barber. The Red Moon ran from May 3, 1909, to May 29, 1909. The Red Moon was also a three-act musical, but set in fictional "Swamptown, Virginia".

In 1908, Lucas became a charter member of the professional theatrical club The Frogs, participating in 1913's The Frog Follies.

In 1913, Lucas starred in the unfinished film, Lime Kiln Field Day, produced by the Biograph Company and Klaw and Erlanger. The footage of the unfinished film was assembled in 2014 by the Museum of Modern Art, which had rescued the film cans from a Biograph film storage vault in 1938.

In 1914, Lucas revived his role of Uncle Tom in William Robert Daly's film adaptation of Harriet Beecher Stowe's Uncle Tom's Cabin. He is generally credited as the first black man to portray Uncle Tom, a character that had typically been played by white actors in black face. The film was released on August 10, 1914, by the World Film Company.

This silent film was shot on location in the South with scenes of its fields of cotton and Mississippi river boats. Its screening was accompanied by organs or other instruments at local theatres. It was an inductee to the 2012 National Film Registry list.

== Personal life ==
Lucas was married no fewer than three times; his second wife was Carrie Melvin, whom he married in Boston, Massachusetts on August 11, 1886. She was a violinist, coronetist and actress. They had one daughter together, Marie Lucas (1891–1947). Marie went on to become a successful pianist, trombonist, arranger and conductor. Sam and Carrie performed together in vaudeville, but they divorced in 1899. Marie and Sam later worked together.

== Death ==
After completing Uncle Tom's Cabin, Lucas died in 1916 from pneumonia, following liver disease for many years.

== Songs ==
- "Carve Dat Possum" (1875)
- "Grandfather's Old Arm Chair" (1877)
- "White Kid Slippers" (1883)
- "De Coon's Salvation Army"
- "Daffney Do You Love Me?"
- De Day I Was Sot Free"

== See also ==
- 1883 in music

== Bibliography ==
- Graham, Sandra Jean (2013). "The Songs of Sam Lucas", Center for Popular Music, Middle Tennessee State University.
- Graham, Sandra Jean (2018). Spirituals and the Birth of a Black Entertainment Industry, pp. 171–175, 210–216, 233–248. University of Illinois Press, 2018.
- Graham, Sandra Jean (2018). "Composing in Black and White: Code-Switching in the Songs of Sam Lucas", in Patricia Hall (ed.), The Oxford Handbook of Music Censorship, pp. 559–92. Oxford University Press.
- Toll, Robert C. (1974). Blacking Up: The Minstrel Show in Nineteenth-century America. New York: Oxford University Press.
- Watkins, Mel (1994). On the Real Side: Laughing, Lying, and Signifying—The Underground Tradition of African-American Humor that Transformed American Culture, from Slavery to Richard Pryor. New York: Simon & Schuster.
