= Luca Family Singers =

African-American singing group

The Luca Family Singers were an African-American singing group, originally from New Haven, Connecticut, in the 19th century, the most famous such singing family modeled after the popular Hutchinson Family Singers. Like the Hutchinsons, the Lucas were active in abolitionism, and began performing in 1850 at abolitionist meetings.

The Luca Family consisted of Alexander C. Luca Sr. (1805–85), a Congregationalist choir director, and his sons, Alexander C. Luca Jr. (second tenor), Simeon G. Luca (first tenor)(1836–54), John W. Luca (bass or baritone) (1834-1910) and Cleveland O. Luca (soprano) (1827–72). In addition to singing as a quartet, they were also instrumentalists. Alexander Sr.'s wife, Lisette Lewis Luca (1810–56), and his sister Diane Luca also performed with the group on some occasions.

Cleveland Luca was a well-known pianist who left the family after being hired by Liberia to teach music there.
