= Wallace King =

American entertainer

Wallace King was an African American minstrel performer from the 19th century. He played with Callender's Georgia Minstrels, and in 1882 was second to only Billy Kersands in pay and popularity. King was a "Sweet Singing Tenor" and known for his emotional, romantic ballads.

King came to London, England, in 1881 with Haverly’s Coloured Minstrels. He was described as “a gentleman with a very dark complexion and a long black beard to match”. The public loved the sentimental songs he sang in his powerful tenor. This troupe toured Britain, then went back to America in 1882. King returned to Britain in April 1884 with a company made up from the amalgamation of Haverly’s company and another called Callender’s Coloured Minstrels which toured Britain until August 1885. He was popular enough to have a (rather successful) racehorse named after him.

His colour was very rarely mentioned in the British press and subsequently in newspapers in Australia and New Zealand. By 1895 he was in Australia, where he spent six years as the ‘favourite tenor’ at the Tivoli Theatre in Sydney. He went to New Zealand in 1901 and in May was appearing in Christchurch where he was simply billed as ‘The World-famed Silver Tenor Vocalist of the Minstrel Stage’. He appeared with the Dix Company in New Zealand at least until December 1902 when he returned to America. He died a few months later in 1903 in Oaklands, California.
