= James Unsworth =

James Unsworth may refer to:

- James Unsworth (cricketer)
- James Unsworth (entertainer)
