= William A. Huntley =

American composer, music teacher, and banjo player (1843–1929)

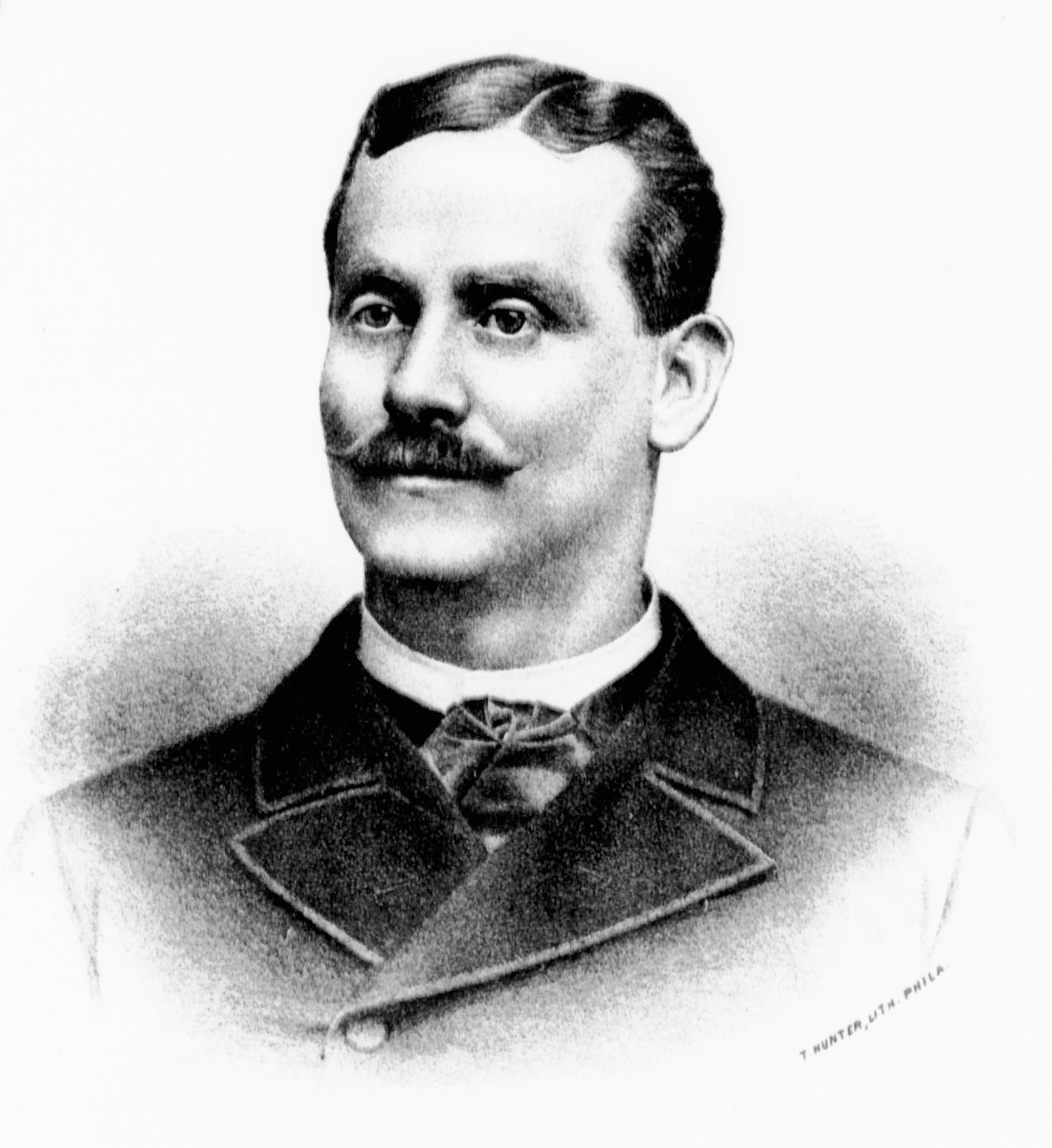
- William A. Huntly, from his 1883 sheet music, Little one whisper you love me

Background information
- Born: William A. Penno; November 2, 1843; Providence, Rhode Island, US
- Died: March 26, 1929 (aged 85) Providence, Rhode Island, US
- Genres: parlor music, classic-banjo instrumentals
- Occupations: performer music teacher, composer
- Instruments: 5-string banjo, piano, vocalist
- Years active: 1860–1893
- Formerly of: 1860 Mead's Euterpean Minstrels; c. Oct 1870 – Jan. 1871 Campbell and Huntley's Minstrels; 1871 solo performances for two weeks; 1871 Lauri English Pantomime Troupe; 1871–1874 Martinetti French Ravel Pantomime Company; 1873 Rogers and McKee Minstrels; 1874 Huntley's Minstrels; 1874–1880 solo performances variety theaters; 1880 J. H. Haverly's Mastodon Minstrels; 1881–1884 Whitmore and Clark's Minstrels; c. 1884–1887 John H. Lee; 1884–1893 independent performances, teaching

William A. Penno (1843–1929), known by his stage name William A. Huntley, was a composer, music teacher, and vocal and instrumental performer in minstrel and vaudeville traditions. Playing his 5-string banjo before crowds that came to number in the low thousands, he sang in a high tenor and played his banjo bare fingered, picking the strings in a style today named "classic banjo." His published compositions include banjo instrumentals and parlor music. Huntley spent his working life performing and teaching in the off season. He performed throughout the United States and toured Europe as a part of several different minstrel groups. A highlight of his performing career was to play before the Prince and Princess of Wales, about 1880 at Her Majesty's Theatre in London. He moved away from minstrel shows by the 1880s, and "took pride" that he could perform without blackface stage makeup. He focused on building respectability for the banjo, through teaching, composition, and performance recitals. He was featured in the S. S. Stewart Company's catalog (showing that art-banjo promoter Stewart recognized his talent) and began to play the company's banjeaurine. In 1888 he performed before a crowd of 2,000 people in his hometown, Providence, Rhode Island.

== Career, minstrelsy to parlor music ==
Huntley first performed onstage in a play in Providence at the age of six. He played the part of "little Tom Bruce" in the play Nick of the Woods. His first minstrel engagement was in 1860 or 1862 with Mead's Euterpean Minstrels at New London, Connecticut.

He worked as a clerk in Providence, recorded in the state census and city directory in 1865.

Two biographies written during his lifetime are vague about the start of his musical career from 1865 to 1869; authors Edward Le Roy Rice and Samuel Swaim Stewart published generalized timelines of his activities. The two give different years for his work with Mead's Euterpean Minstrels. He was reported by Le Roy Rice to have joined the Campbell and Huntley Minstrels in 1865, and to have played with them for several years. However, news clippings indicate that group was formed in November 1870. Between 1868 and 1870 he was reported to have opened a music-teaching academy in Providence in which he gave banjo socials once a week, his "first attempt at edging the banjo into high society." However, he was not listed in the Providence, Rhode Island city directory from 1866 to 1869. He re-appeared in the Providence city directory in 1870 both as William A. Penno, music teacher, and William A. Huntley, musician.

Newspaper accounts in 1870 may be the earliest record of his music career. In October 1870, he became business partners with Charles Austin, John D. Hopkins and George W. Huntley to form Campbell, Huntley and Austin's minstrels, sharing profits. They became Campbell and Huntley's Minstrels in the midst of a November and December fallout between Austin and Hopkins in the newspapers. Originally planned to be together for four weeks, the group was still intact in January 1871.

William A. Huntley began receiving his mail as a performer independent of Campbell and Huntley's Minstrels in February 1871. He and George (later "Dr. Geo. W.") Huntley continued to associate repeatedly into the 1880s. George Huntley became a successful manager and agent (organizing shows in towns ahead of the arrival of the minstrels), working with the Huntley Minstrels, the Martinetti-Ravel Pantomime Company and Whitmore and Clark's Minstrels.

By September, Huntley was performing on his own at the Howard Athenaeum in Boston, performing as a solo banjoist and making his first "whiteface" appearance on stage. William joined the Lauri English Pantomime Troupe by October 1871 and the Martinetti French Ravel Pantomime Company from December 1871-July 1872. In early 1873 he joined the McKee and Rogers Company, and afterwards rejoined the Martinetti Troupe. In 1874 he became co-partner with George W. Huntley again, in the management of Huntley's Minstrels, and performed in the principal theaters of the country for the next four years.

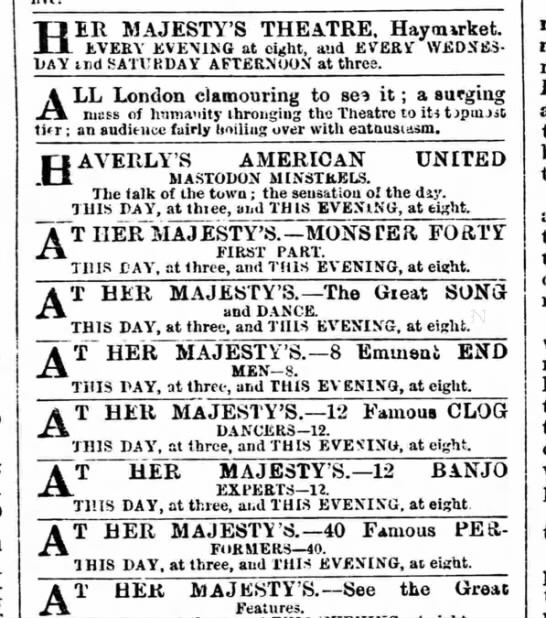
Advertisement for Haverly's Mastodon Minstrels in London 1880. Huntley was one of the 12 banjo experts.

Huntley was especially engaged to play banjo for the blackface Haverly's United Mastodon Minstrels in London, and led the group's big banjo act in which twelve performers appeared at one time. He gave a first performance at Her Majesty's Theatre on July 31, 1880 and remained three months. During this period, Huntley had the honor of appearing before the Royal Family. Afterward, he played in the principal cities of England and in Paris. He left Europe later in 1880 and arrived in Memphis, Tennessee on December 30, to fill out his contract with Mr. Haverly's "New Mastodon Minstrels."

From 1881 to 1884 Huntley performed with Whitmore and Clark's Minstrels, and later formed a partnership with John H. Lee. The two men opened a banjo teaching-studio in Providence and performed together, Lee on the 6-string banjo and Huntley on the banjeaurine.

Lee left for California in June 1887, while Huntley continued to teach and perform.

=== Blackface vs. whiteface, a change of image ===
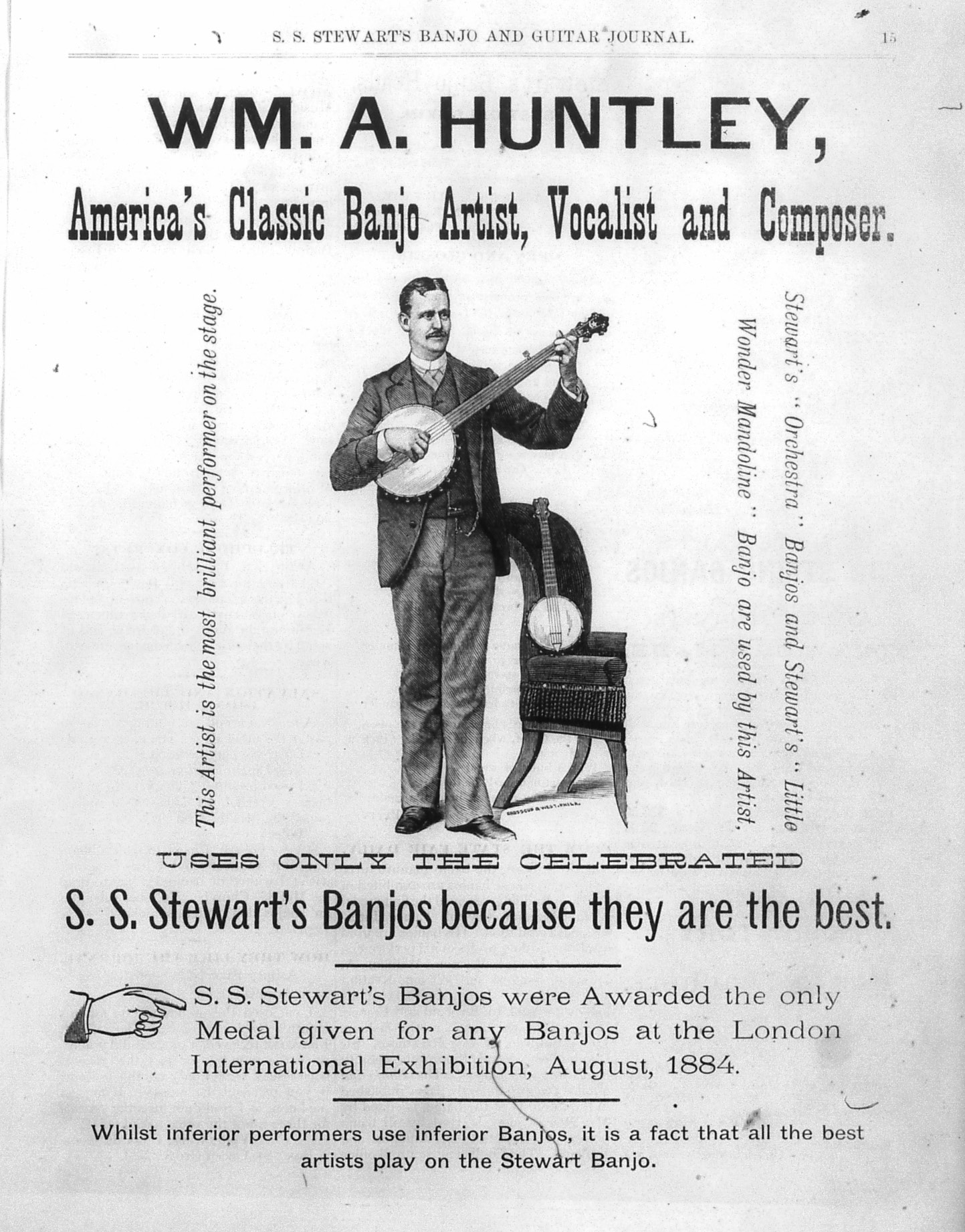
William A. Huntley, from S. S. Stewart's Banjo and Guitar Journal, Oct.—Nov. 1884.

Description of a William A. Huntley performance

"Will A. Huntley gave a pleasing musical setting to a number of my songs, which met with favor in several cases and here, I recall another incident. He opened an engagement at Miner's Bowery Theatre. He was an artistic banjo player and a sweet tenor singer. At first, the manager told him he was afraid a Bowery audience would not stand for his appearing in full evening dress—swallow tails and all—and make the stage, with things thrown, look like a delicatessen shop. 'Don't you care. I'll sweep up,' said Huntley. It was a hot night and over a thousand of the audience were in shirt waists or the like. But the kids and the 'gods' were nice and recalled Huntley twice [for encores]. Then he gave them our, "When the birds nave gone to sleep." The instrumentation and voicing carries with it a flute obbligato imitating the pretty song and twitter of birds at twilight. That brought out an applause that sprained the roof. I was there and heard the sprain."

— Arthur Wells French, songwriter for "When the birds have gone to sleep", for which Huntley composed music,

The minstrelsy show-business of the 1860s, when Huntley was breaking into his career, meant performing in blackface. However Huntley also engaged with performing groups that labeled themselves vaudeville and with pantomime groups. He performed his solo act in variety shows, where he had more control over how he presented himself.

Huntley performed at Tony Pastor's. Starting in the mid-1860s, impresario Tony Pastor capitalized on middle class sensibilities and spending power when he began to feature "polite" variety programs in his New York City theatres. Pastor used the term "vaudeville" in place of "variety" in early 1876, hoping to draw a potential audience from female and family-based shopping traffic uptown by barring liquor in his theatres and bawdy material from his shows.

Huntley had been experimenting with a different image from the early 1870s. He was characterized by minstrel Edward LeRoy Rice as having been successful performing in whiteface. It is not completely certain whether Rice meant his performances used white facepaint in the tradition of pantomime clowns, or if Huntley performed without any makeup at all.

An 1884 news article made it likely he was performing without stage makeup. The reviewer said, "Mr. Wm. A. Huntley is the only banjo artist in the country that has ever made a success in white face."

Huntley was among the first to use the term classic banjo to describe his music. The phrase today means a style of playing the banjo bare fingered, picking out the notes with two fingers and a thumb. For Huntley, the term spoke of quality and he used it throughout the 1870s. Huntley became associated with Samuel Swaim Stewart, a banjo centered entrepreneur, and former blackface performer, who was trying to move the banjo toward greater respectability. Huntley was featured regularly in the S. S. Stewart Banjo and Guitar Journal, starting 1883, and Stewart published some of his music.

Huntley took to the idea of a refined image for the banjo, and modified an idea used by J. H. Haverly and other large minstrel performance companies. Some of their advertising posters showed them marching in solidarity, in formal dress and in white face. However, their performers would perform in blackface, still formally dressed. Huntley would show up as himself, dressed in full evening dress, to perform that way even in rough places like the Bowery.

From 1887 to 1893, he also performed at concerts organized by Fairbanks and Cole, high-end banjo manufacturers in competition with S. S. Stewart.

== Works ==
=== Methods ===
- Complete School of Harmony for the Banjo, Philadelphia: The W. F. Shaw Co., Wm. H. Keyser & Co., 1887

=== Compositions ===
==== Musical score, voice and piano ====
LOC are scores preserved at the Library of Congress. LSMC are scores preserved at the Lester M. Levy Sheet Music Collection. BERK are scores at the California Sheet Music Project at the Berkley Library.

He composed many song with lyrics by other musicians including Samuel N. Mitchell, Arthur W. French (1846-1919), Jerry Cohan (father of George M. Cohan), George Birdseye and Ernest Hardenstein.

- 1871 LOC Addie Alleen. Words by Samuel N. Mitchell, music by William A. Huntley.
- 1871 LOC Come sing to me Addie again. Words by Sam N. Mitchell, music by William A. Huntley.
- 1871 LOC Down the meadow, 'neath the clover. Words by Sam N. Mitchell, music by William A. Huntley.
- 1871 LOC Goodbye, dear Mother! Words by Sam N. Mitchell, music by William A. Huntley.
- 1871 LOC Oh Nixie, that's too thin. Words by Sam N. Mitchell, music by William A. Huntley.
- 1871 LOC Our sweet little rosebud has flown. Words by Sam N. Mitchell, music by William A. Huntley.
- 1871 LOC When the moon is rising, Allie. Words by Samuel N. Mitchell, music by William A. Huntley.
- 1872 LOC Bring the absent back to me. Words by Samuel N. Mitchell, music by William A. Huntley.
- 1872 LOC Down among the daisies. Words by Arthur W. French, music by William A. Huntley.
- 1872 LOC Kiss me, love, before I go. Words by Arthur W. French, music by William A. Huntley.
- 1872 LOC Under the silvery stars. Words by Arthur W. French, music by William A. Huntley.
- 1873 LOC Close the door softly, for mother's asleep. Words by Samuel N. Mitchell, music by William A. Huntley.
- 1873 LOC Down beside the crimson meadow. Words by Samuel N. Mitchell, music by William A. Huntley.
- 1873 LOC Down the vale where Lillie sleeps. Words by Samuel N. Mitchell, music by William A. Huntley.
- 1873 LOC Just try it once for luck. Words by Samuel N. Mitchell, music by William A. Huntley.
- 1873 LOC Let me kiss him ere I go. Words by Samuel N. Mitchell, music by William A. Huntley.
- 1873 Mamma, come sing me to sleep. Words by Samuel N. Mitchell, music by William A. Huntley.
- 1873 LOC My button hole boquet. Words by Samuel N. Mitchell, music by William A. Huntley.
- 1873 LOC 'Neath the rose leaves on the hillside. Words by Samuel N. Mitchell, music by William A. Huntley.
- 1873 LOC The girl that took my eye. Words by Jerry Cohan, music by William A. Huntley.
- 1873 LOC Under the buttercups. Words by Samuel N. Mitchell, music by William A. Huntley.
- 1873 LOC Where have the dear children gone?. Words by Samuel N. Mitchell, music by William A. Huntley.
- 1874 LOC Oh just you wait and see. Words by Samuel N. Mitchell, music by William A. Huntley.
- 1874 LOC We met by chance, sweet Jenny. Words by Samuel N. Mitchell, music by William A. Huntley.
- 1875 LOC When the purple lilacs blossom. Words by Samuel N. Mitchell, music by William A. Huntley.

===== Alcoholism =====
- 1872 LOC Mother and I have been waiting. Words by Samuel N. Mitchell, music by William A. Huntley.

===== Death =====
- 1878 LOC Our Willie died this morning. Words by Samuel N. Mitchell, music by William A. Huntley.

===== Flirtation =====
- 1878 LOC Just to please the boys. Words by Jerry Cohen, music by William A. Huntley.

===== Goodbye to a love =====
- 1880 BERK Bye and bye you will forget me. Words by Arthur W. French, music by William A Huntley.

===== Home =====
- 1875 LOC LSMC Take me back to home and mother. Words by Arthur W. French, music by William A. Huntley.
- 1879 IMSLP BERK Some Day I'll Wander Back Again. Words by Arthur W. French, music by William A. Huntley.
- 1883 LOC Must we leave the old home, mother?. Words by Arthur W. French, music by William A Huntley.

===== Hunger =====
- 1874 IMSLP Hush, My Little Darling. Words by Samuel N. Mitchell, music by William A. Huntley.

===== Love at a distance =====
- 1878 LOC Black eyed Binie's gone to rest. Words by Arthur W. French, music by William A. Huntley.
- 1883 LOC Waiting a letter from overseas. Words and music by William A. Huntley.

===== Minstrelsy =====
- 1879 LOC LSMC I'm going home to Clo. Words by Samuel N. Mitchell, music by William A. Huntley.

===== Money =====
- 1878 LOC Your pocket book's your friend. Words by William S. Austin, music by William A. Huntley.

===== Religious theme =====
- 1871 LOC The angels are calling me, Mother. Words by Samuel N. Mitchell, music by William A. Huntley.
- 1871 LOC They are calling me to join them. Words by Samuel N. Mitchell, music by William A. Huntley.
- 1885 LOC Raise me, Jesus, to thy bosom. Words by George Birdseye (1844-1919), music by William A. Huntley.

===== Romance =====
- 1872 When the song bird says good night. Words by Samuel N. Mitchell, music by William A. Huntley.
- 1878 LOC When the birds have gone to sleep. Words by Arthur W. French, music by William A. Huntley.
- 1880 LOC Come and meet me, Rosa darling. Words by Samuel N. Mitchell, music by William A. Huntley.
- 1883 LOC Little one, whisper you love me. Words by Arthur W. French, music by William A Huntley.

===== Romance and marriage =====
- 1885 LOC Say but that tender word, Yes. Words by Ernest Hardenstein, music by William A. Huntley.
- 1885 LOC She's as pretty as the roses in the morning. Words and music by William A. Huntley.

==== Musical score, banjo instrumentals ====
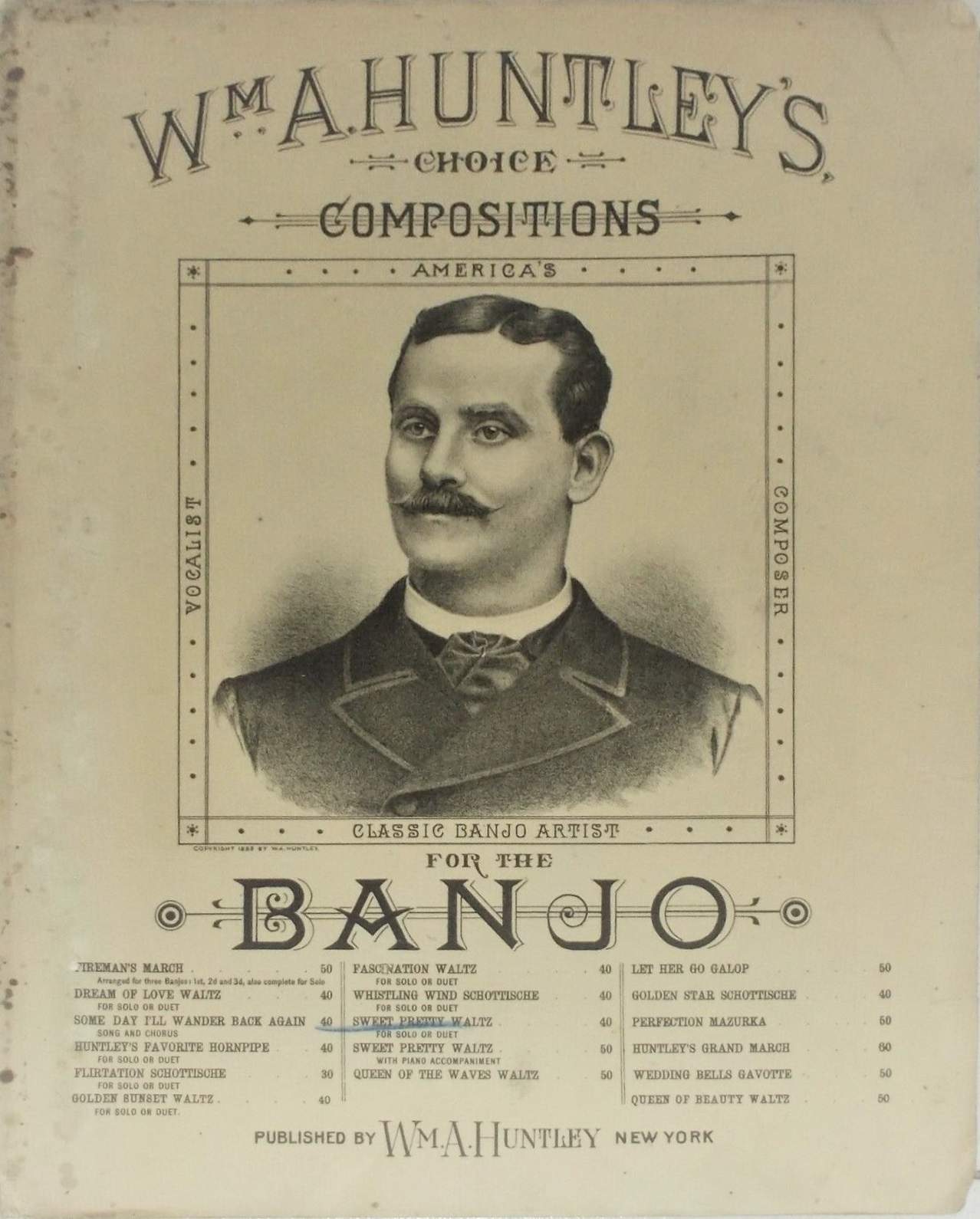
1883. Sweet Pretty Waltz. Shows published banjo compositions.

- Fireman's March, arranged by William A. Huntley
- Dream of Love Waltz
- Some Day I'll Wander Back Again
- Huntley's Favorite Hornpipe
- Flirtation Schottische
- Golden Sunset Waltz
- Queen of the Waves Waltz
- Let Her Go Galop
- Golden Star Schottische
- Perfection Mazurka
- Huntley's Grand March
- Wedding Bells Gavotte
- Queen of Beauty Waltz
- 1883 Rocky Point Schottische.
- 1884 Central Park Polka.
- 1884 Mandoline Schottische. Composed by William A. Huntley.
- 1884 Sweet Pretty Waltz.
- 1885 Fascination Waltz.
- 1885 Rocky Point Schottische for banjo and piano.
- 1885 Whistling Wind Schottische.

==== Musical score, piano instrumentals ====
- 1872 LOC Mitchell Waltz. Written to honor Samuel N. Mitchell.
- 1883 Flirtation Schottische
- 1883 Our Brigade, Grand March

==== Huntley's works arranged by other artists ====
- 1877 The Girl That Took My Eye, schottische. Music by William A. Huntley, arranged for piano by J. S. Knight.
- 1880 LOC Take me back to home and mother [instrumental]. Words by Arthur W. French, music by William A. Huntley, transcription for piano by Francis Florentine Hagen.
- 1883 LOC Some Day I'll Wander Back Again. Transcribed for piano by Adam Geibel.
- 1884 Take me back home to mother. Arranged for Cornet by Thomas A. Becket. Published by W F Shaw. Galveston, Tex. : Thos. Goggan & Bro., 1884.
- 1885 LOC Some Day I'll Wander Back Again. Arranged for cornet and piano by Thomas A. Becket, Jr.
- 1906 LSMC Some Day I'll Wander Back Again, fantasia for piano. Adam Geibel.

==== Compositions recorded by other artists ====
Huntley's compositions were recorded by artists between 1898 and 1926 on Berliner, Victor, Columbia and Edison labels. Examples include:

- Bye and bye you will forget me. William A Huntley; Arthur W French; S H Dudley; Roger Harding. New York : E. Berliner's Gramophone, 1898.
- Some day I'll wander back again. Clarence Whitehill; Arthur W French; William A Huntley. Camden, N.J. : Victrola, [1917]
- Take me back to home and mother. William A Huntley; Clarence Whitehill; Arthur W French. Camden, N.J. : Victor, [1917]
- When the twilight comes to kiss the rose good night Robert F Roden; H W Petrie; Elsie Baker; Frederick J Wheeler; William A Huntley. Camden, N.J. : Victor Record, [1913]
- Will you love me when I'm old? Margaret Keyes; Joseph Ford; William A Huntley; Columbia Stellar Quartette. New York : Columbia, [1916]
