= John H. Lee (musician) =

John Haley
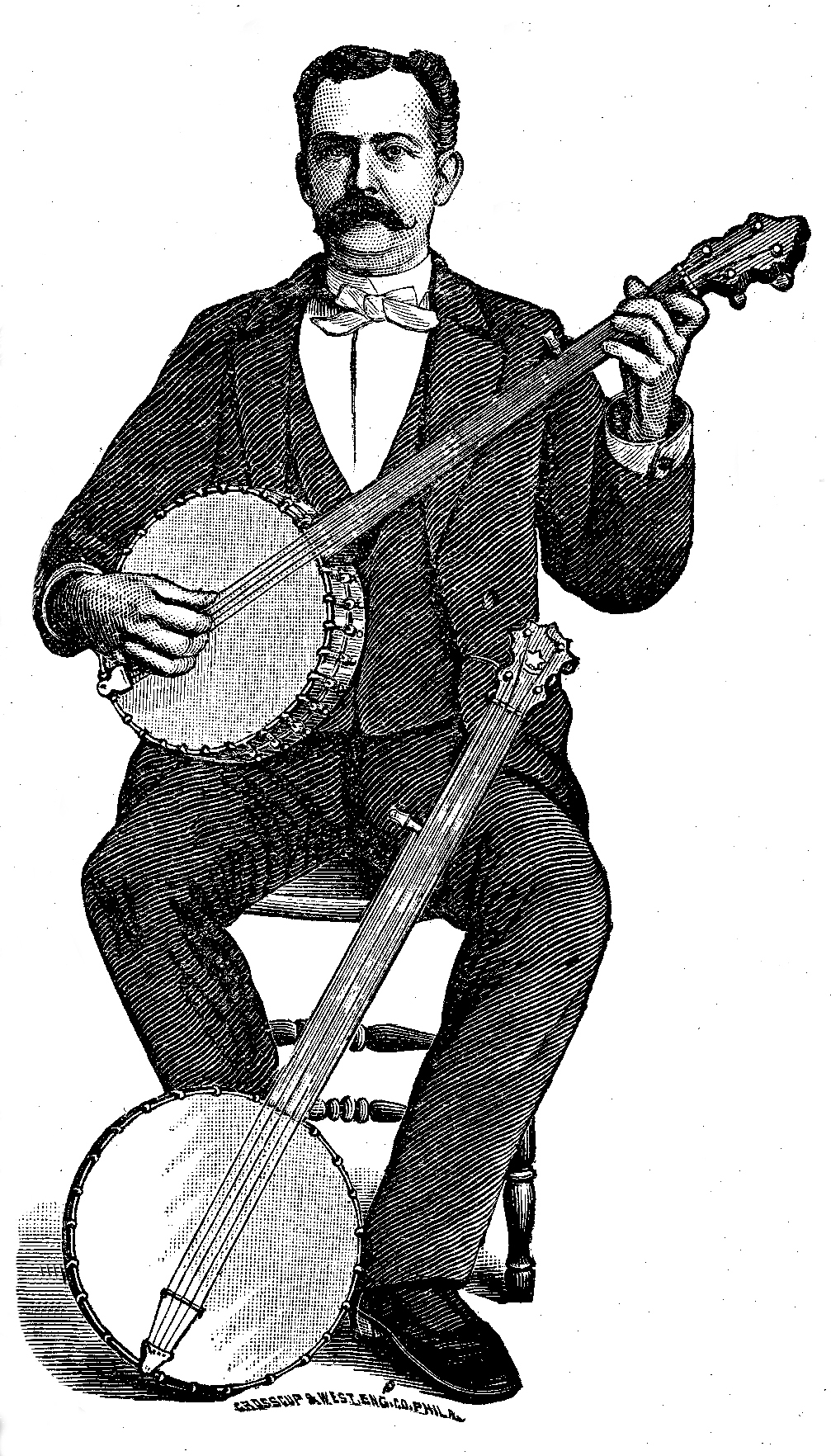
- John H. Lee, 1886.

Background information
- Also known as: John H. Lee
- Born: 1847; Phillipsburg, New Jersey
- Died: September 7, 1890 (aged 42–43) San Diego, California
- Genres: minstrel, instrumental
- Occupations: composer, performer
- Instruments: 5-string banjo, 6-string banjo, banjeaurine

John H. Lee (1847 – September 7, 1890) was the stage name for John D. Haley, an American banjoist, composer and author of the late 19th century. He was known as a harmonist, writing lessons for playing harmony on the five-string banjo and employing "remarkeable fingering" to construct chords. He promoted three new types of banjo for S. S. Stewart, the banjeaurine, Little Wonder picolo banjo, and six-string banjo, performing on the instruments alongside William A. Huntley.

== Biography ==
Prior to working in the music business, John Haley lived in San Francisco, California, where he made shoes, "but having musical talent of the highest order, he decided to make it his business." In 1873 he won a small "silver banjo" for his playing in a local community social event. He left San Francisco after 1873, not appearing in the San Francisco city directory after then. Lee's next steps haven't been documented, but he is known to have worked as a treasurer at Madison Square Theatre in New York City.

As early as 1875, he performed with James E. Adams in a minstrel show known as "Adams and Lee." The two became headliners in other acts, including Bryant's Minstrels by 1875 and Haverly's minstrels by 1878. While performing with Haverly's in the United States, he "directed a team of 14 banjoists." In 1879, he joined the J. H. Haverly's Minstrels group that performed in England in 1880. He and Adams stayed with Haverly's into 1883 after returning to the United States.

He met banjoist William A. Huntley while with Haverly's. The two performed together later as a duo from 1885 to 1887, and he taught with Huntley in Providence, Rhode Island. He edited a method book for Huntley, titled Wm. A. Huntley’s Complete School of Harmony, Embracing Chord Construction and Modulation for the Banjo, published in 1887. About the same time he had his own banjo methods published by S. S. Stewart: Chord Construction for the Banjo was published as a serial in Stewart's Banjo and Guitar Journal, and The Eclectic School for the Banjo was published as sheet music.

His partnership with Huntley lasted until June 24, 1887, when Lee formed a banjo trio with Dan Emerson and L. A. Burrit in New York. Less than a year later, his health began to deteriorate and he became a patient at St. Vincent's Asylum in New York in September 1888. However he was transferred to National City, California, in hope that the more congenial climate would help him to recover. He moved to San Diego, California where he started the "San Diego Banjo and Guitar Club." He died from tuberculosis September 7, 1890 in San Diego.

== Playing style ==
Lee was characterized by banjo educator Thomas A. Armstrong as a "harmonist devoted to the interest of the banjo" whose "playing consists almost entirely of difficult compositions of his own, abounding in chords and remarkable fingering for the left hand".

He played his banjo with what was then "the usual way", a bare-fingered technique of playing known today as classic banjo. The technique used the right-hand fingertips or pads of the first two fingers and thumb to fingerpick the strings. Lee also used his thumbnail for the deep bass notes "that are required to be played with force," to sound the string "clearer and louder."

== Gallery ==
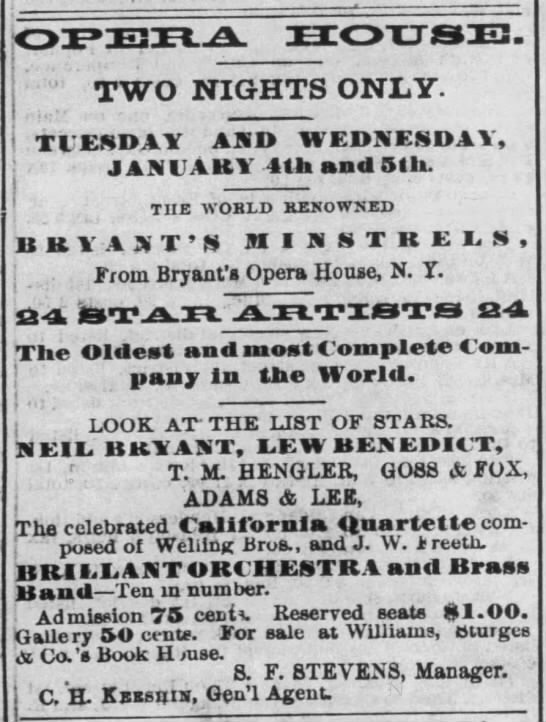
1875. Adams and Lee toured with Bryant's Minstrels in 1875.

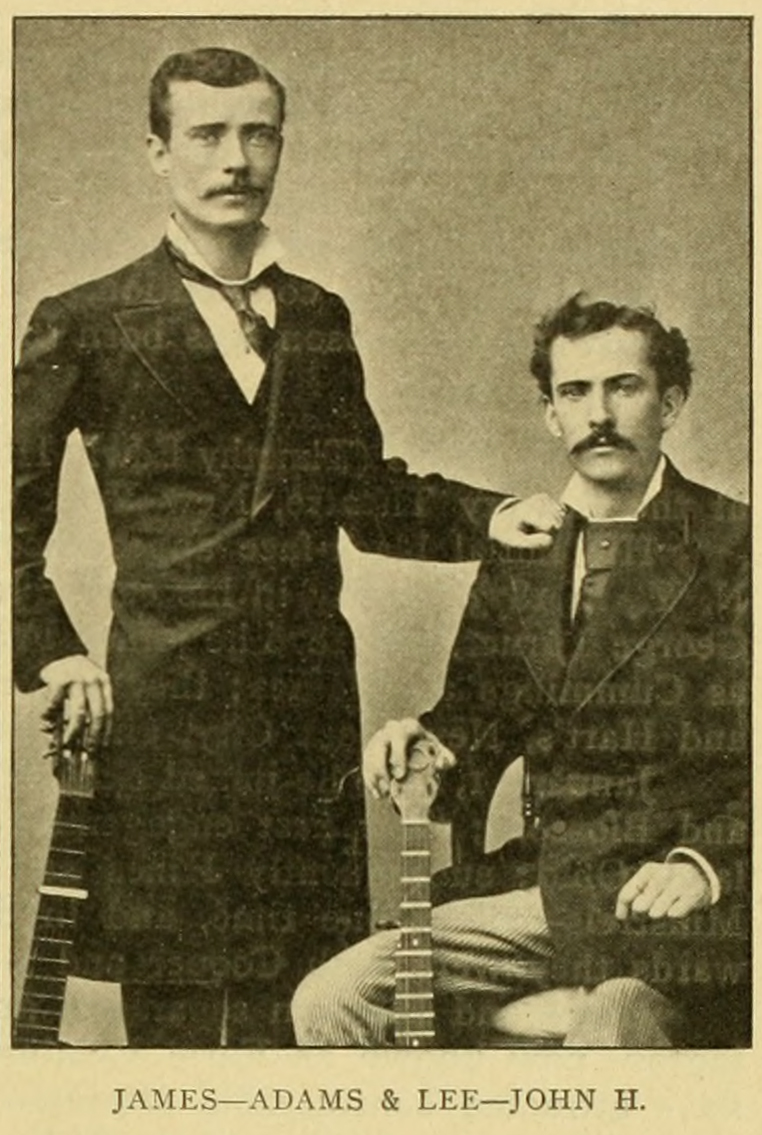
1870s. James E. Adams and John H. Lee. After Haverly's, Lee left the group. Adams performed as a soloist with Barlow, Wilson and Rankin's Mammoth Minstrels in 1886.

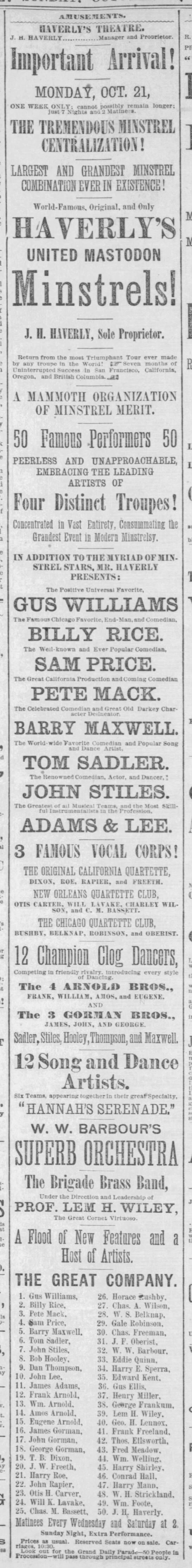
October 1878. Adams and Lee played with Haverly's United Mastodon Minstrels.

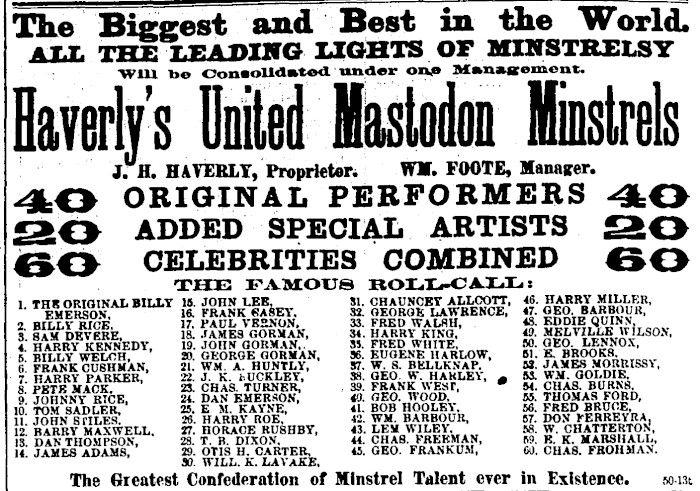
March 1880. John H. Lee and James Adams, William A. Huntley and Dan Emerson, whom he performed with elsewhere.

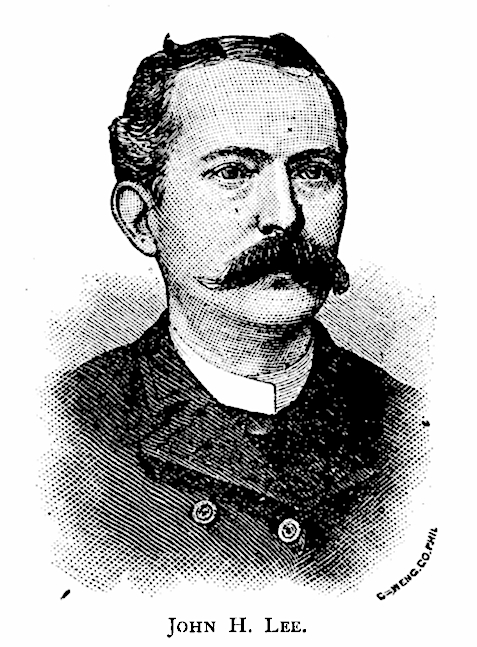
John H Lee, S.S.Stewart's Banjo and Guitar Journal, August 1886.

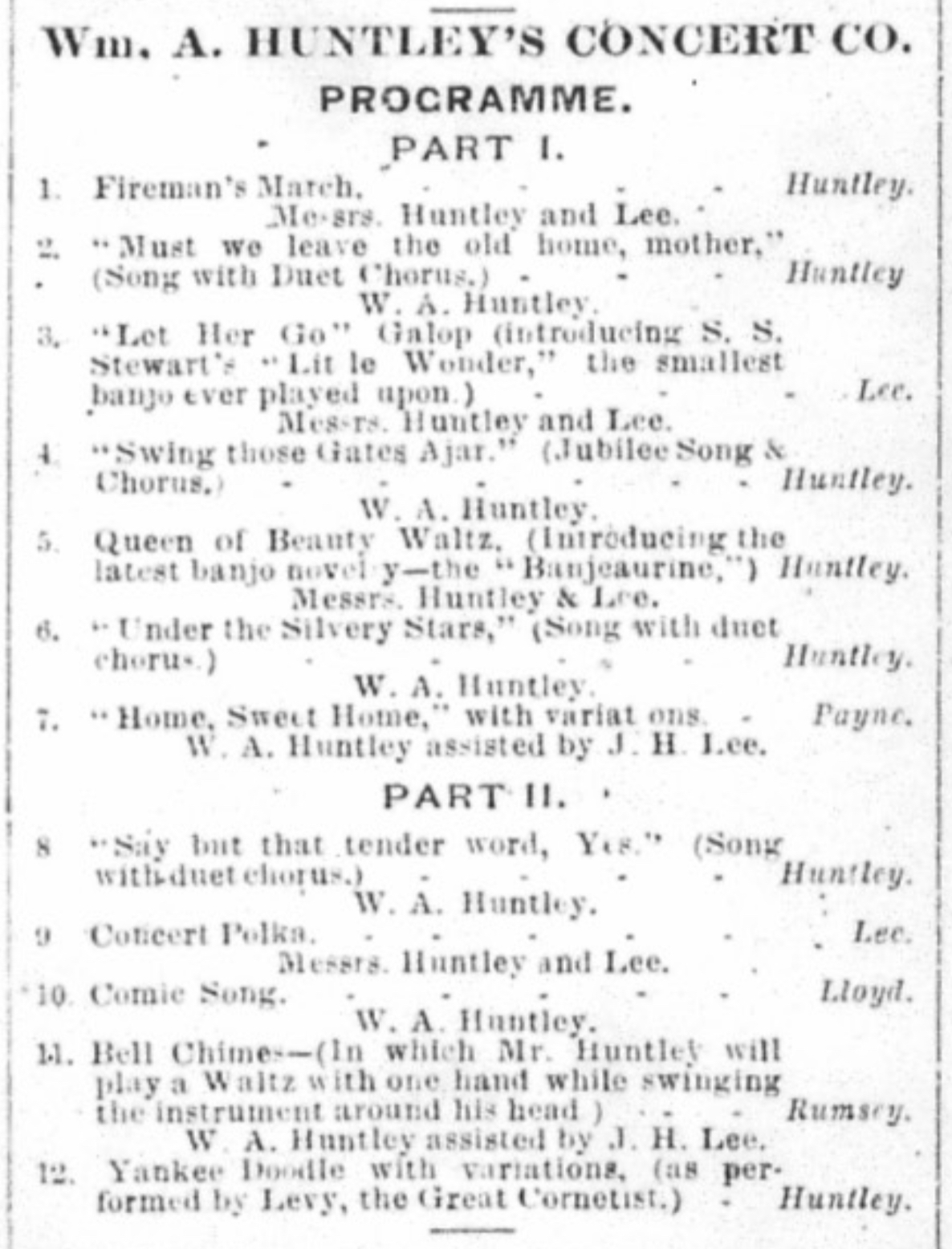
1886. Program, William A. Huntley's Concert Company.

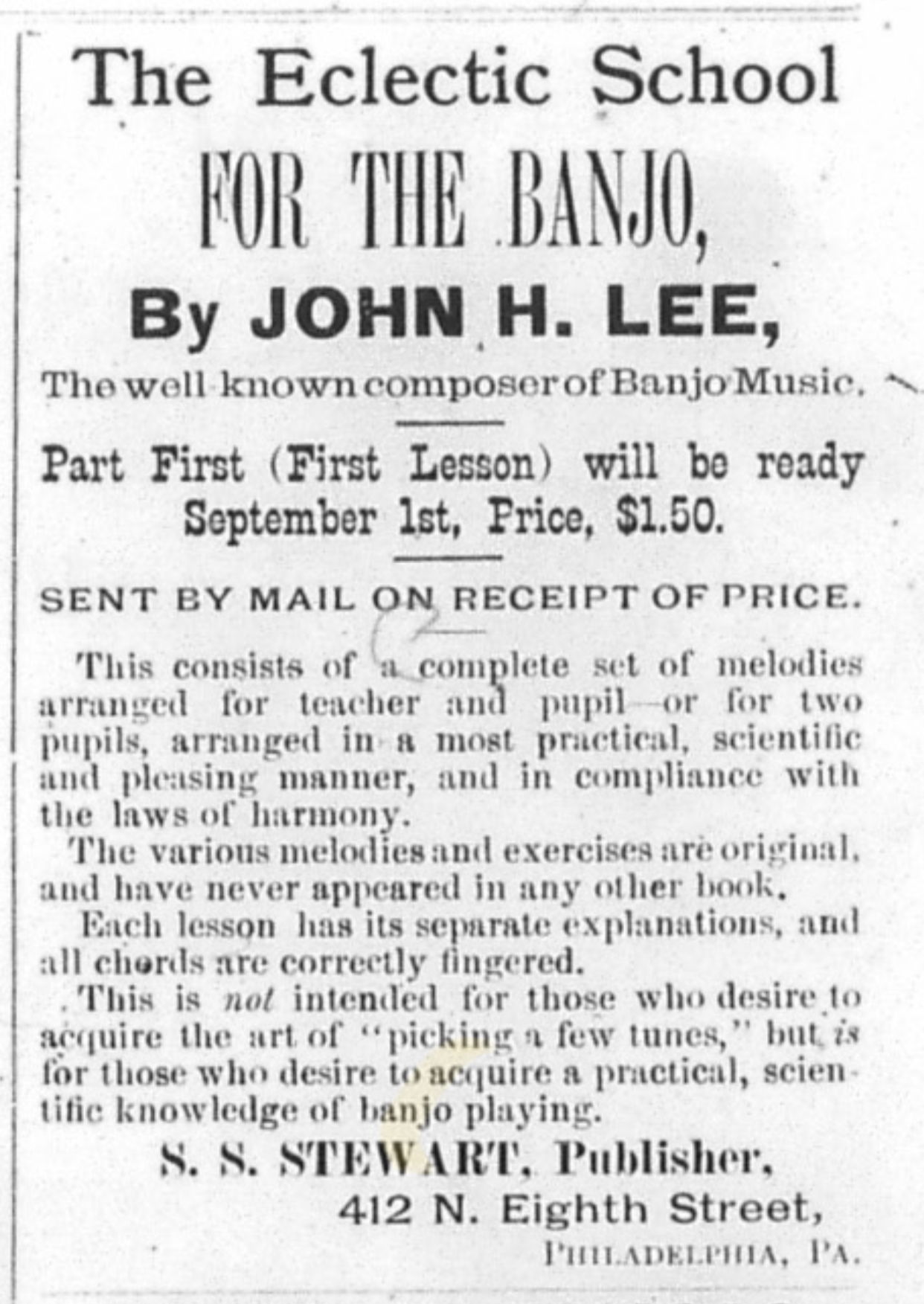
1886. Eclectic School for the Banjo, part 1.

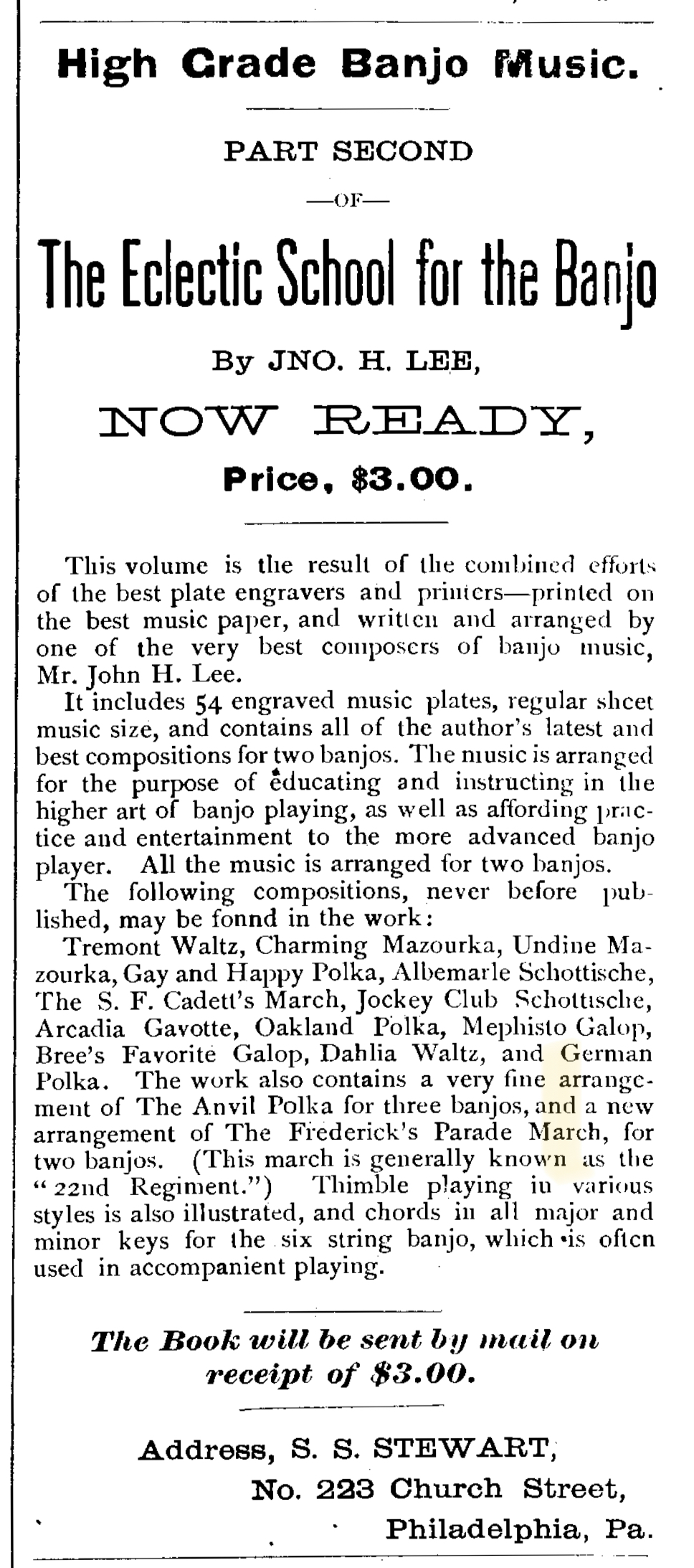
1887. Eclectic School for the Banjo. S. S. Stewart published this work and many of Lee's compositions.

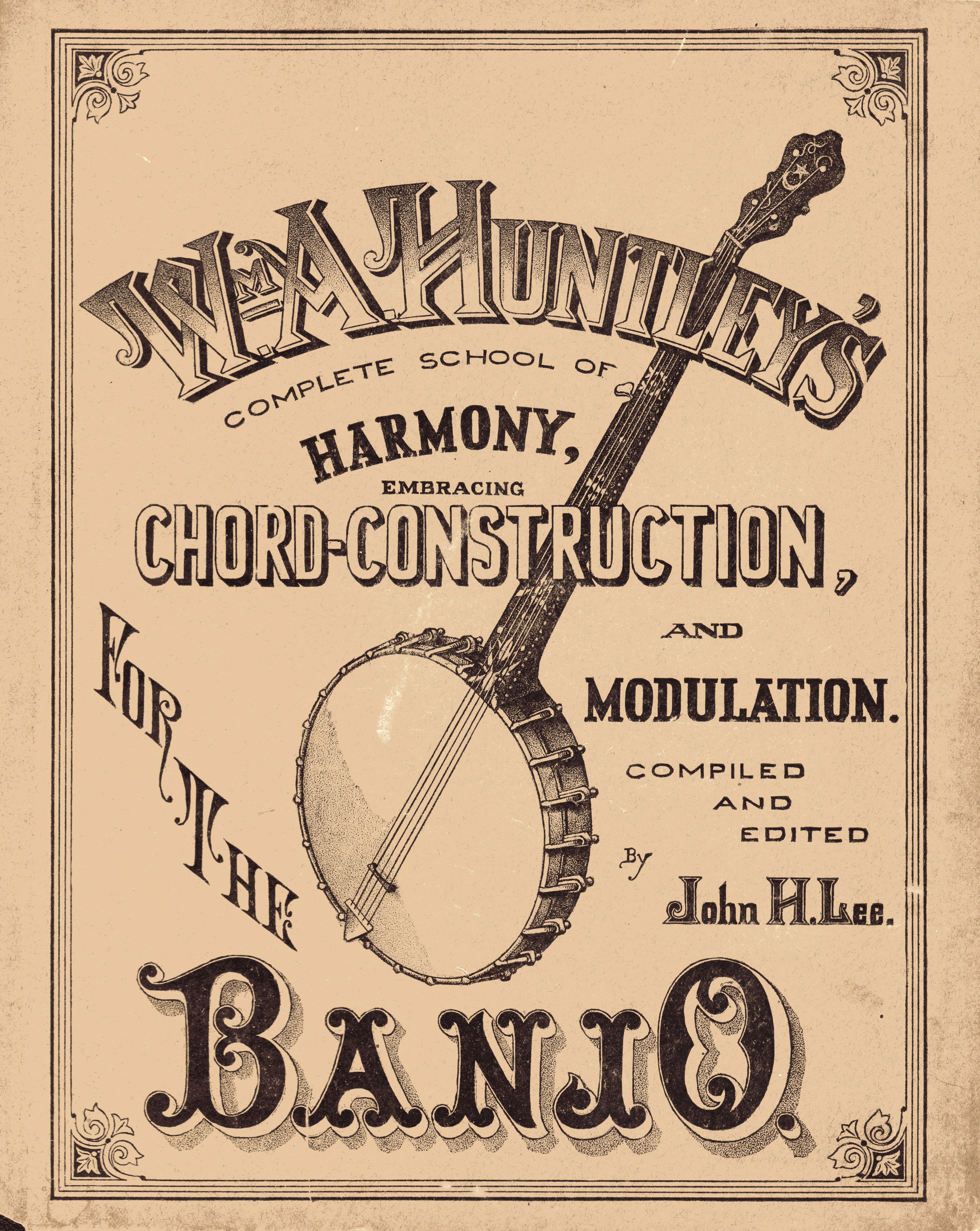
1887. W. A. Huntley's Complete School of Harmony for the Banjo, compiled and edited by John H. Lee

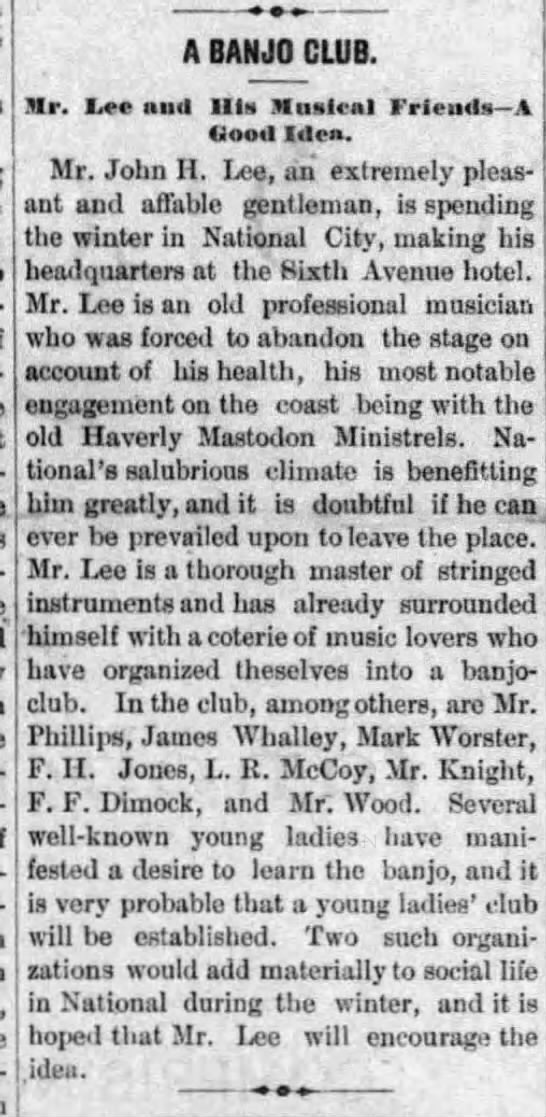
November 1888. Banjo club at National City, California

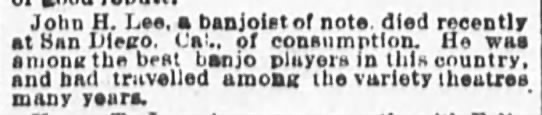
Death announcement for banjoist John H. Lee.

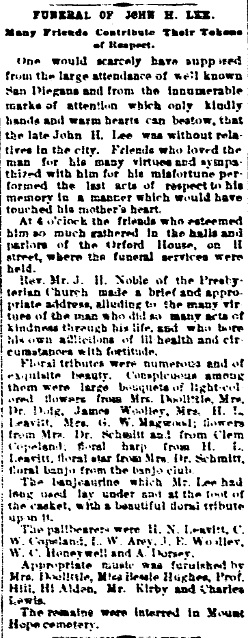
Funeral, John H. Lee, San Diego, 9 September 1890. Members of the San Diego Banjo Club were present.

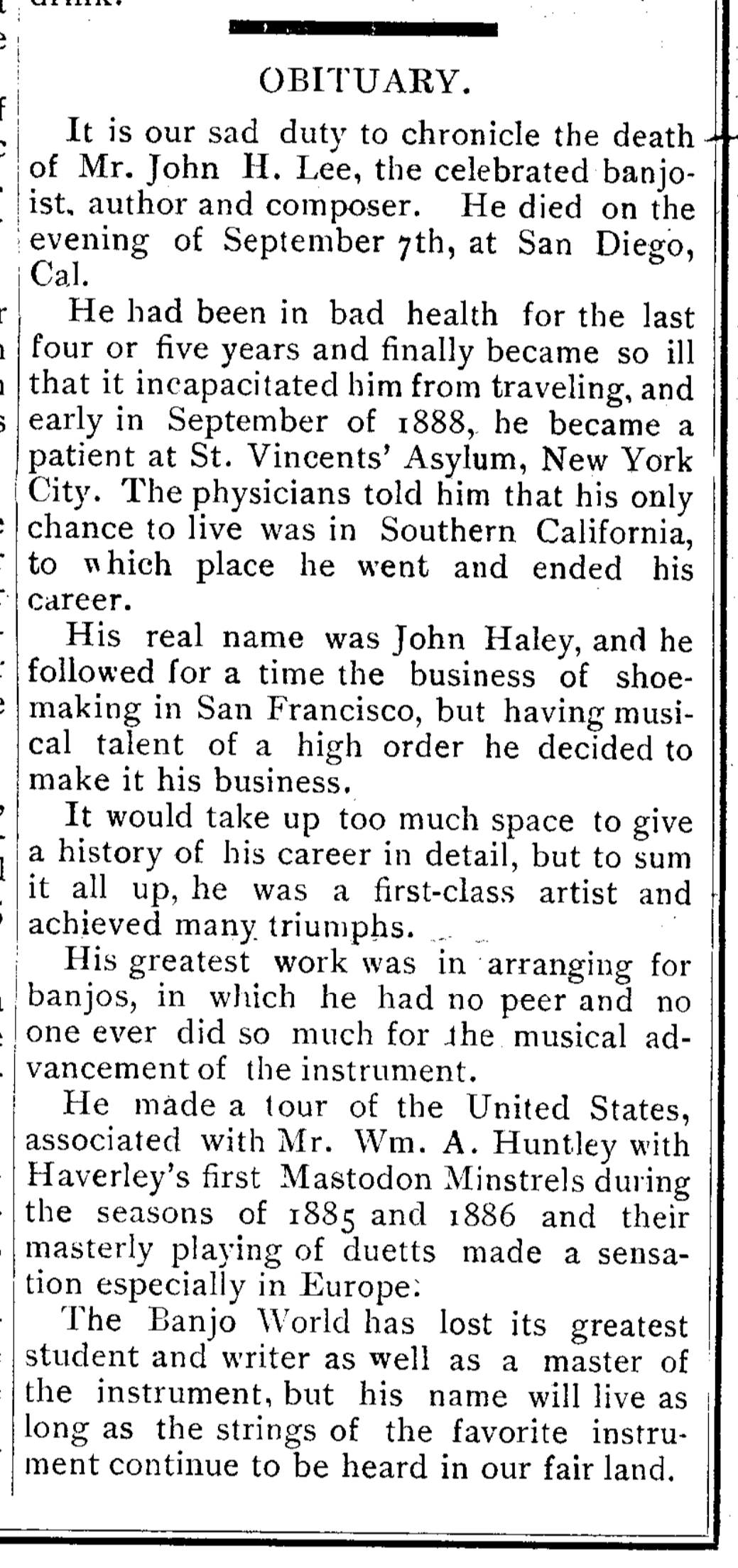
1890. Obituary John H. Lee, Catcomb's Banjo and Guitar Journal

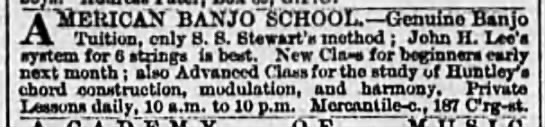
1891. Advertisement in Sydney, Australia, for banjo classes using materials by S S Stewart, John H Lee and William A Huntley.

== Works ==
=== Books and instructional works ===
- 1886 Chord Construction for the Banjo, series published in S. S. Stewart's Banjo and Guitar Journal
  - April–May 1886. Chapter 1: Degrees of scale, doctrine of intervals, the construction of simple triads
  - August–September 1886. Chapter 3: Brief rules for all chords in all keys
  - October–November 1886. Chapter 4: Chords in keys of E major and C♯ minor
- September 1886. Eclectic School for the Banjo part 1, published by S. S. Stewart
- 1887. Eclectic School for the Banjo part 2, published by S. S. Stewart
- 1887 W. A. Huntley's Complete School of Harmony for the Banjo, compiled and edited by John H. Lee

=== Sheet music ===
- 1876 I'se gwine home. Words by Sam. Murdy, music by John H. Lee.
- 1882 Mastodon Waltz. Music for banjo by John H. Lee.
- 1883 Florence Polka. Music for banjo by John H. Lee.
- 1883 J. E. Brewster's Waltz. Arranged for banjo by John J. Lee.
- 1885 Amy Schottische. Music for banjo by John H. Lee.
- 1885 Claudine Waltz. Music for banjo by John H. Lee.
- 1885 Damon and Pythias Polka. Composed for banjo by John H. Lee.
- 1885 "Frisco" galop. Music for banjo by John H. Lee.
- 1885 Marie March. Arranged for banjo by John H. Lee
- 1885 Winifred Waltz. Composed by John H. Lee for nanjo with piano accompaniment by Thomas J. Armstrong.
- 1886 Banjo duet. Arranged by John H. Lee.
- 1886 Picanniny Jig. By John H. Lee.
