= Sanford's Opera Troupe =

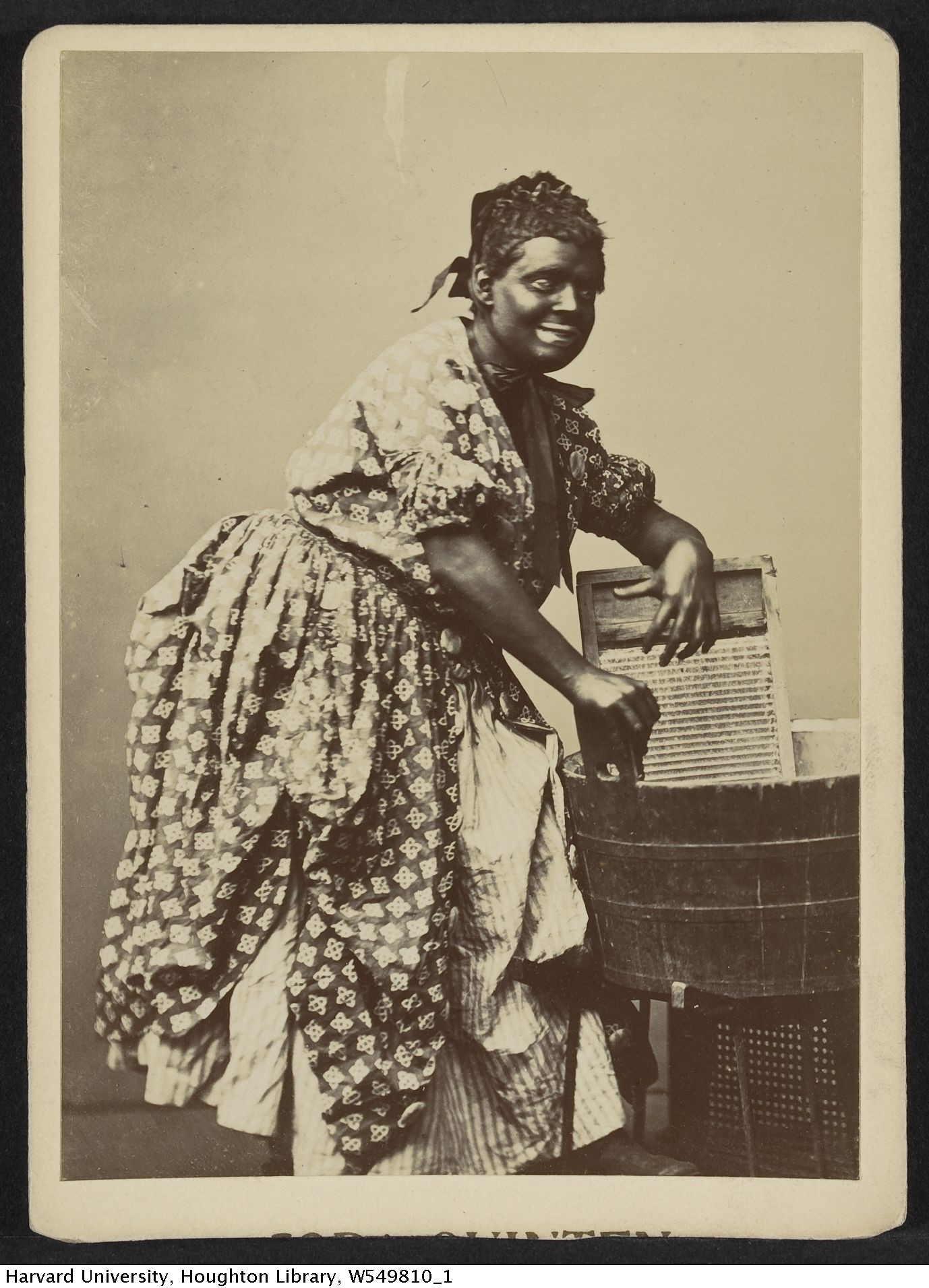
Samuel S. Sanford as a minstrel character

Sanford's Opera Troupe was an American blackface minstrel troupe headed by Samuel S. Sanford (1821–1905). The troupe began in 1853 under the name Sanford's Minstrels. The name changed that same year to Sanford's Opera Troupe. The lineup changed in 1856 and again in 1857, when they disbanded.

S. S. Sanford Minstrels of Philadelphia performed and Sanford was described as the oldest living minstrel manager.

He and his minstrel group were advertised at a Sanford's "New Opera House".

== See also ==
- John Hodges (minstrel)
- James Unsworth (entertainer)
