= James Unsworth (entertainer) =

English blackface comedian, banjo player and songwriter

- Born: 2 July 1835; Liverpool, England
- Died: 21 February 1875 (aged 39); Liverpool, England
- Occupations: Blackface comedian and entertainer
- Years active: c. 1850–1875

James Unsworth (2 July 1835 – 21 February 1875) was an English blackface comedian, banjo player and songwriter, who performed in Britain, Canada and the United States.

== Career ==
Unsworth was born in Liverpool, England, and grew up in Griffintown, Montreal, Canada, a predominantly Irish Catholic neighbourhood. He started performing in blackface in a minstrel show in about 1850, and joined S. S. Sanford's Minstrels in Philadelphia. He toured widely in the U.S. and Canada, with several minstrel shows including Bryant's Minstrels and Campbell's Minstrels.

Described as an "Ethiopian Comedian", Unsworth sang Irish songs and played the banjo. Theatre critic T. Allston Brown described him as "a good end man, a merry handler of the banjo, a good comic singer, quick at an impromptu repartee, and a successful performer in broad burlesque". According to the minstrel show producer and historian Edward Le Roy Rice: "[He] was one of those rare performers who were concededly away ahead of the times in which they flourished. The word 'great' may be truly applied to him, for while he excelled in all he undertook, he was famous for his stump speeches, for his banjo solos, and for his singing of Irish songs...".

From 1860, he worked with a female impersonator, Eugene D'Amali. Escaping the Civil War, they performed in Britain and Europe between 1861 and 1868, with Unsworth leading his own troupe of minstrels well as joining several other companies. Unsworth became best known as "The Stump Orator", lecturing his audiences in comic fashion, often incorporating topical allusions, banging the table and the ground with an umbrella, and ending with "Am I right, or any other man?", which became a popular catchphrase.

He continued to tour after going back to America. After returning to England in 1874, he toured with Sam Hague's Minstrels. According to Richard Anthony Baker, he had been "virtually forgotten" in England at that time.

He died in Liverpool in 1875, aged 39, and was buried in Liverpool Roman Catholic Cemetery at Ford, Bootle.
