= Samuel Swaim Stewart =

American musician and banjo maker (1855–1898)

S. S. Stewart
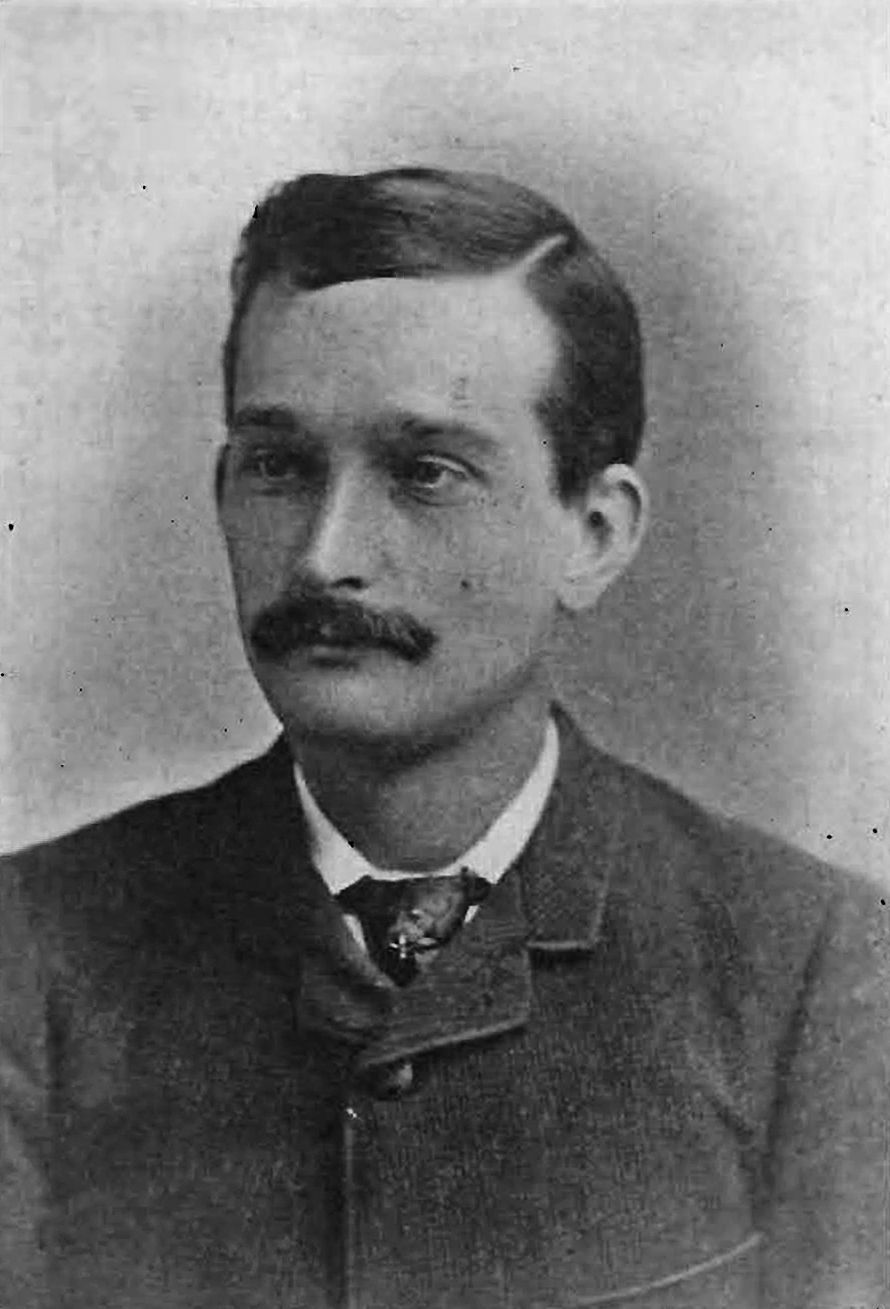
- Samuel Swaim Stewart in 1898

Background information
- Also known as: Samuel Swaim Stewart
- Born: January 8, 1855; Philadelphia, Pennsylvania
- Died: April 6, 1898 (aged 43) Philadelphia, Pennsylvania
- Genres: parlor music, classic-banjo instrumentals
- Occupations: musical instrument manufacturer, composer, performer
- Instruments: 5-string banjo, violin, piano, organ, flute
- Years active: 1878-1898

Samuel Swaim Stewart (January 8, 1855 – April 6, 1898), also known as S. S. Stewart, was an American musician, composer, publisher, and manufacturer of banjos. He owned the S. S. Stewart Banjo Company, which was one of the largest banjo manufacturers in the 1890s, manufacturing tens-of-thousands of banjos annually. He also published the S. S. Stewart Banjo and Guitar Journal from 1882 to 1902. He is known today for his efforts to remake the banjo into an instrument of cultural sophistication and for his high-quality banjos. For Stewart, that sophistication included learning to properly sight-read music, so as to be able to play the "proper repertoire" for middle-class citizens.

== Childhood ==
Stewart's father was a physician and "medical director" for Swaim's Panacea, a patent medicine. His family was well off and pushed Stewart toward a music career. He began training on the violin when he was 12 under Professor Carl Gaertner.

Stewart was inspired to play the banjo by hearing banjoist Lew Simmons play at a concert, when Stewart was a boy. He purchased a tack-head banjo (banjo with skin sound-table nailed to the instrument's head with tacks) to learn to play and was disappointed with the instrument's quality, especially when comparing it to his violin. Although discouraged by his initial banjo experience, he got instruction in 1872 from George C. Dobson of Boston and Joseph Ricket of Philadelphia. With his earlier training toward a classical-violin career, he didn't need much musical instruction; he became a good enough player, that after "several lessons, " he himself began teaching others to play.

== Teaching, publishing and sales career built on standards ==
When Stewart began learning and teaching the banjo, the instrument was embedded in an era of the blackface-minstrel and variety shows. Initially, he taught what was standard for banjo performing repertoire, organizing a minstrel show. Then he took a step away from the minstrel music that was the popular music of its day, embracing European music and society culture and envisioning the banjo in that setting. He pushed European music as proper for the banjo, to make it the equivalent of the violin. In his efforts to change the banjo's image, he was facing an established culture which he considered "vulgar", the banjo frequently being the instrument of the "variety parlors and drinking saloons" and dance halls instead of in middle-class homes with ladies and gentlemen. Using his S.S. Stewart's Banjo and Guitar Journal he promoted performances and recitals.

As he began selling his banjos and publishing, Stewart began competing to with his former teacher George Dobson, who had come out with a simplified way of teaching people to play. Dobson's method didn't teach students to read sheet music, and Stewart felt they would be struck at the level of picking out simple songs. He felt students should learn to read sheet music from the beginning so that they could progress into more complex and satisfying songs.

== Building an S. S. Stewart banjo ==
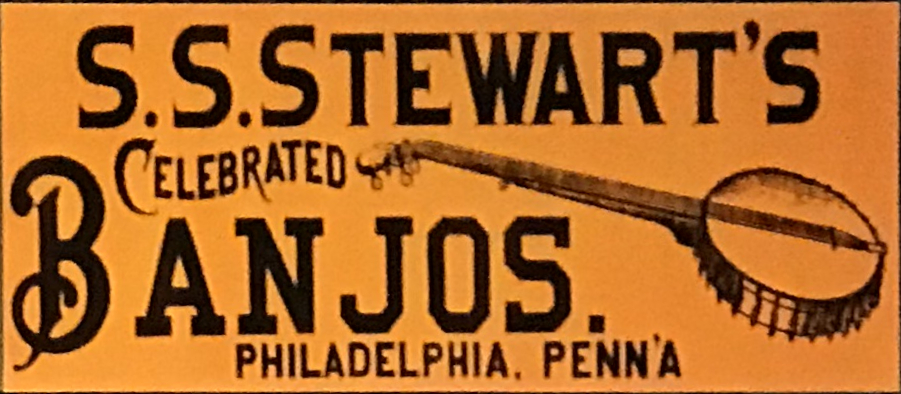
S. S. Stewart sheet-metal sign, used by musical instrument shops.

Alongside teaching, he began making banjos. His banjo rims were made of a layer of German silver outside of a wooden layer. The silver folded over a wire on top of the wooden rim, and the silver and wire were sandwiched between the wood rim and the skin. Stewart felt that the silver-and-wood combination would produce the best tone, a combination of the silver ring of metal with pure tones from wood. Having arrived at this conclusion, he committed to it, while his competition continued to develop their banjos, which eventually may have reached a quality to surpass his.

His company became a major manufacturer, competing with Lyon and Healy, A. C. Fairbanks and William A. Cole. These men and their companies were producing some of the highest quality banjos of the Classic Era (1880s-1910s).

Stewart and his company were part of a larger movement to create the banjo into an instrument of concert halls. Others participating in this movement included Fred Van Eps, Vess Ossman, Frederick J. Bacon, Alfred A. Farland and George W. Gregory. These players were to take on European works by Beethoven, Paganini and Mendelssohn. He associated with some of the better banjo players of his time, including E. M. Hall, Horace Weston, John H. Lee and William A. Huntley, promoting them in his journal and printing their endorsements of his products.

== Gallery ==
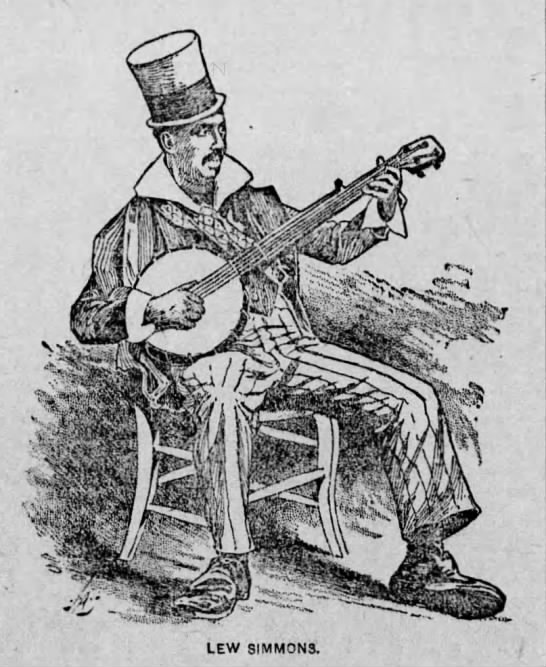
Lew Simmons, a 19th-century musician who played blackface minstrel music inspired Stewart to learn the banjo

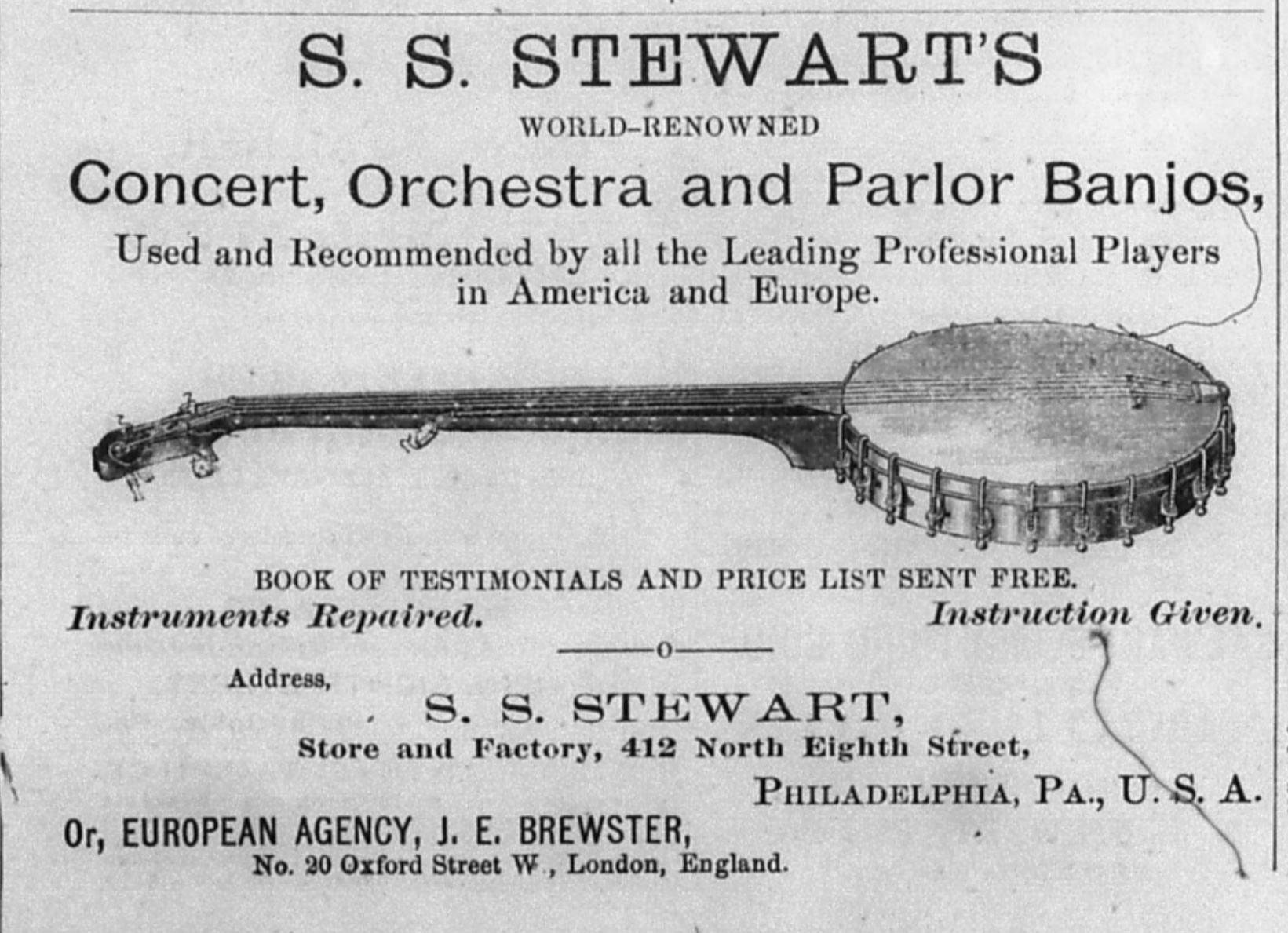
1884. Stewart declares the intended venues of his instruments, concert halls, orchestra music and women's parlors.

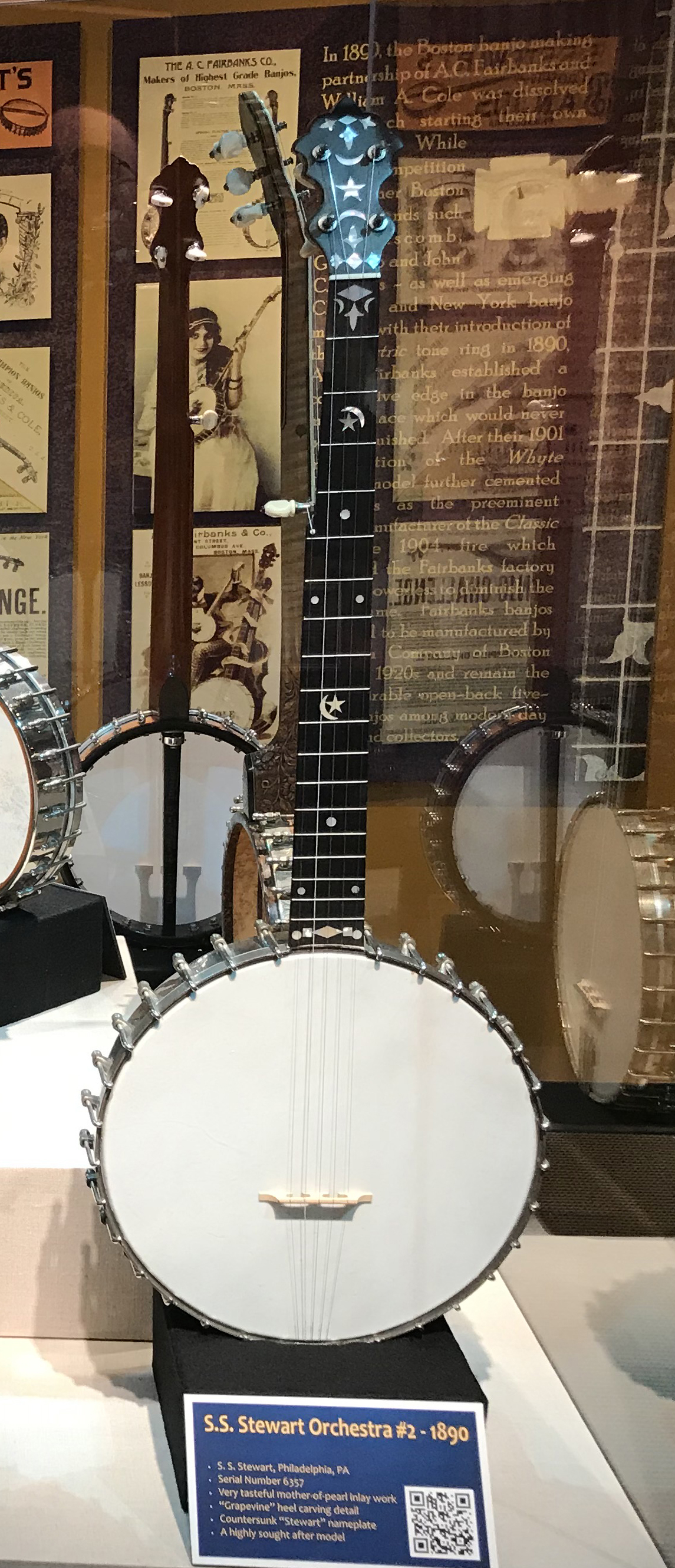
S. S. Stewart orchestra banjo #2, at the American Banjo Museum.

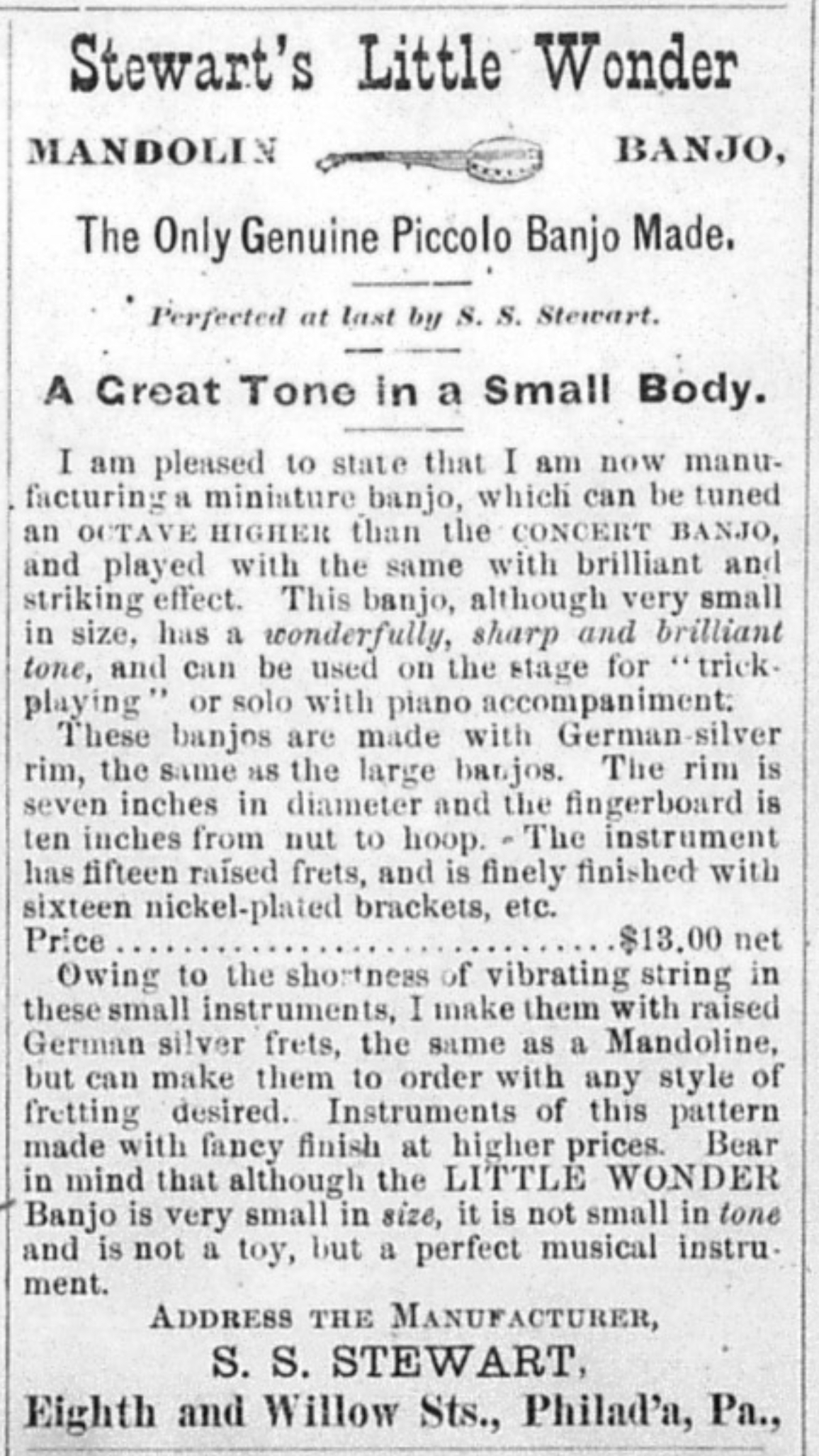
S. S. Stewart's Little Wonder Piccolo Banjo or Mandolin Banjo

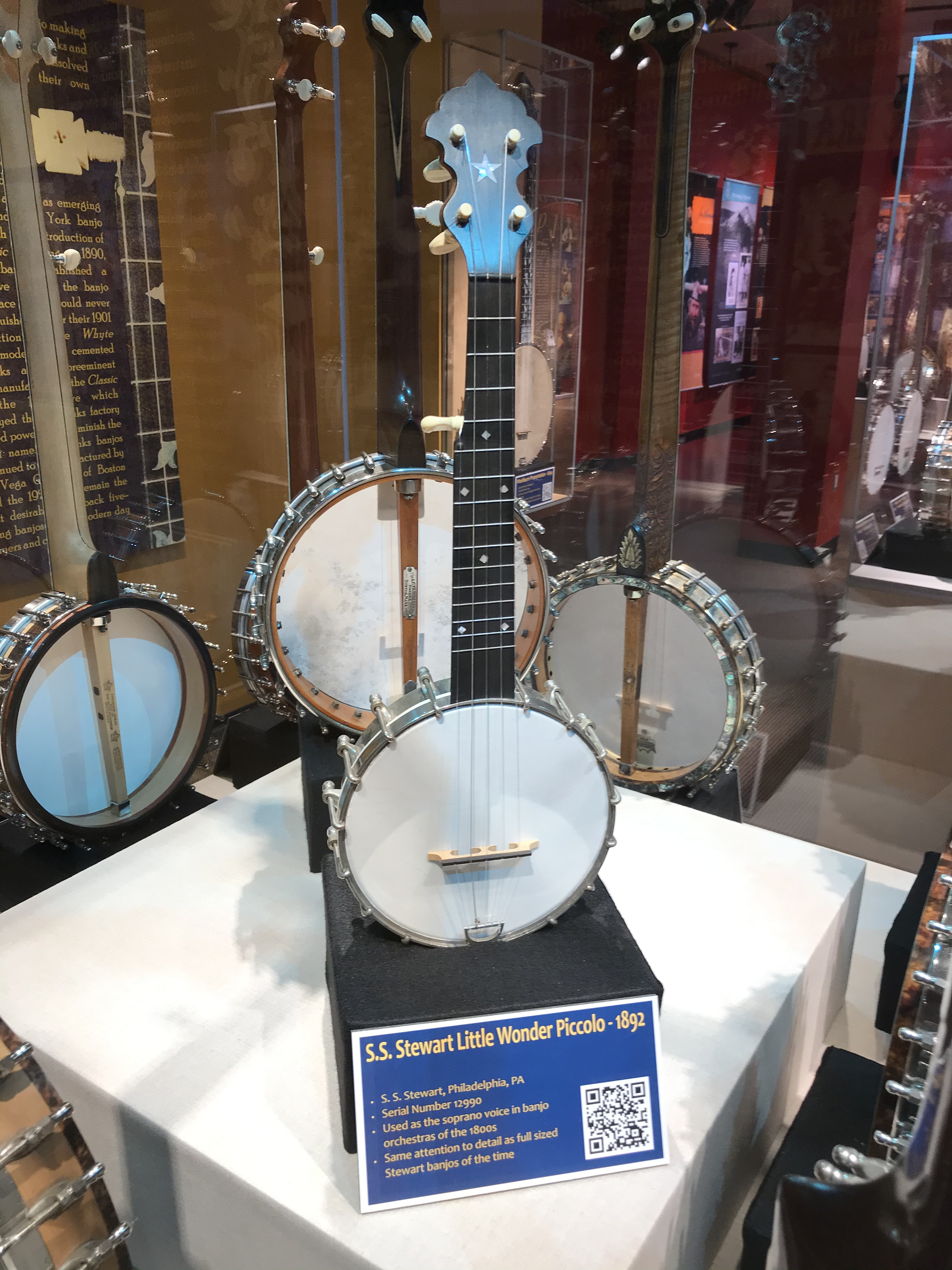
Stewart designed the Little Wonder piccolo banjo to play very high notes in a banjo orchestra.

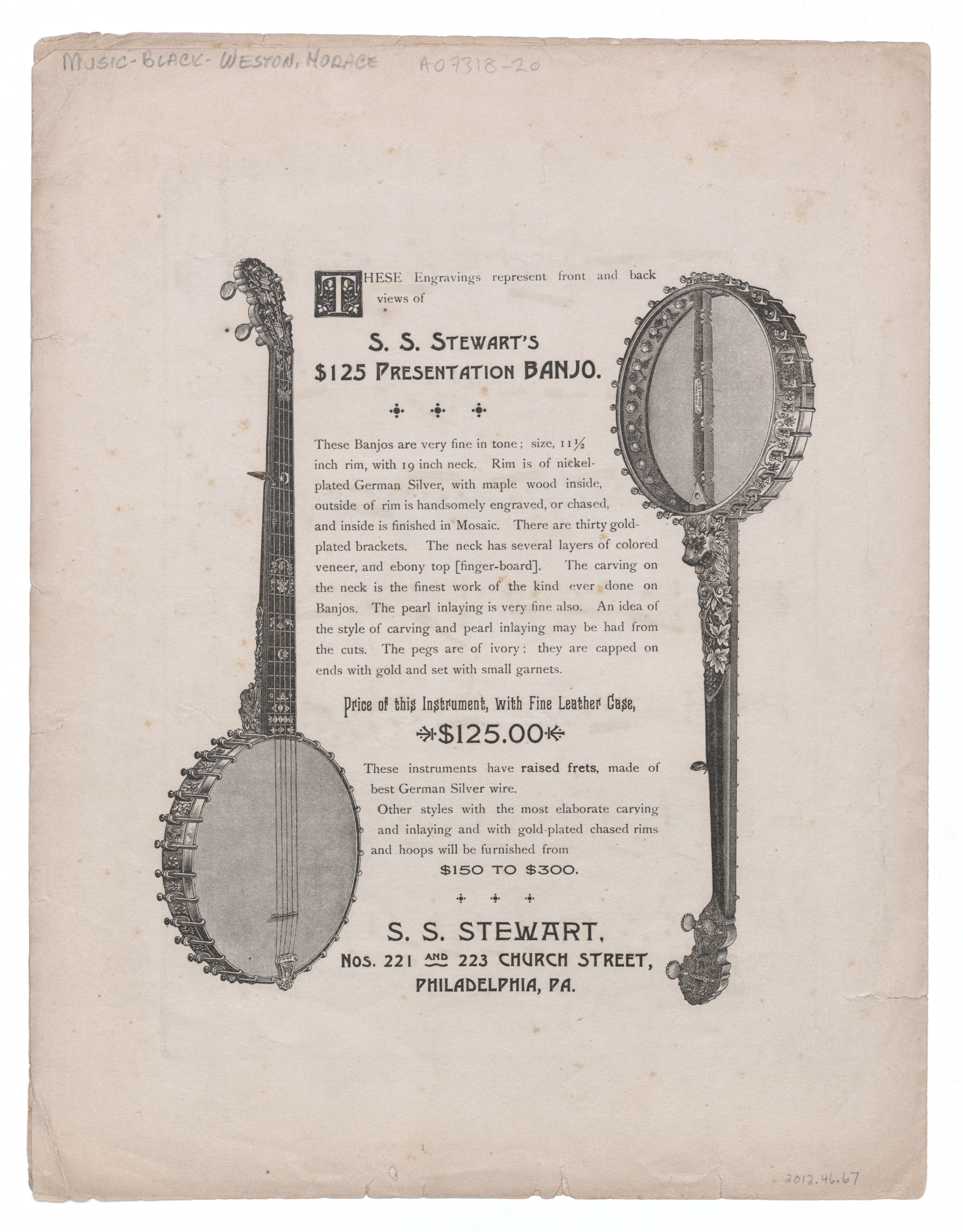
1883 Advertisement: S. S. Stewart's Presentation Banjo, in Horace Weston's "Seek No Further March" sheet music.

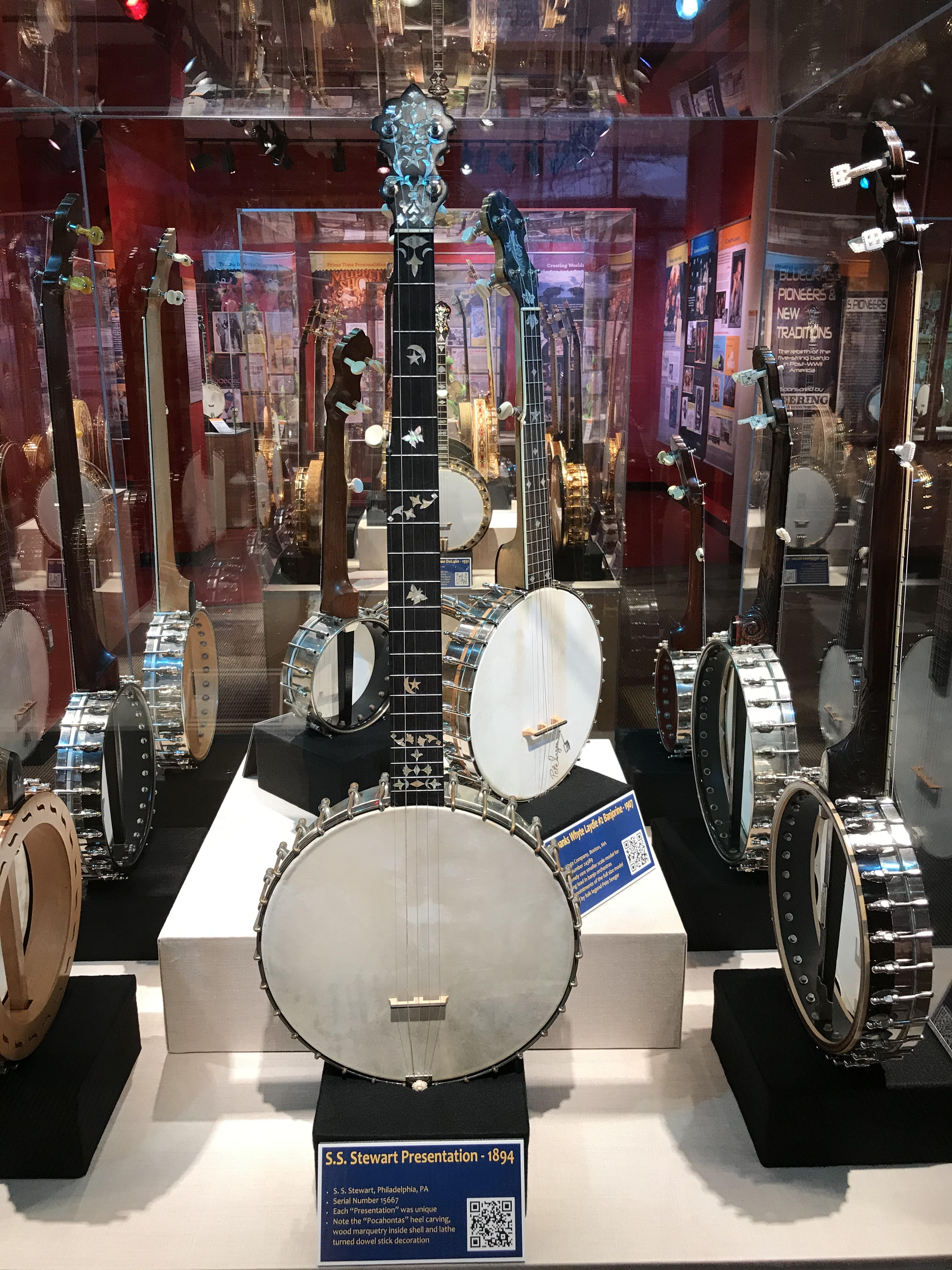
S. S. Stewart Presentation Banjo from 1884 at the American Banjo Museum

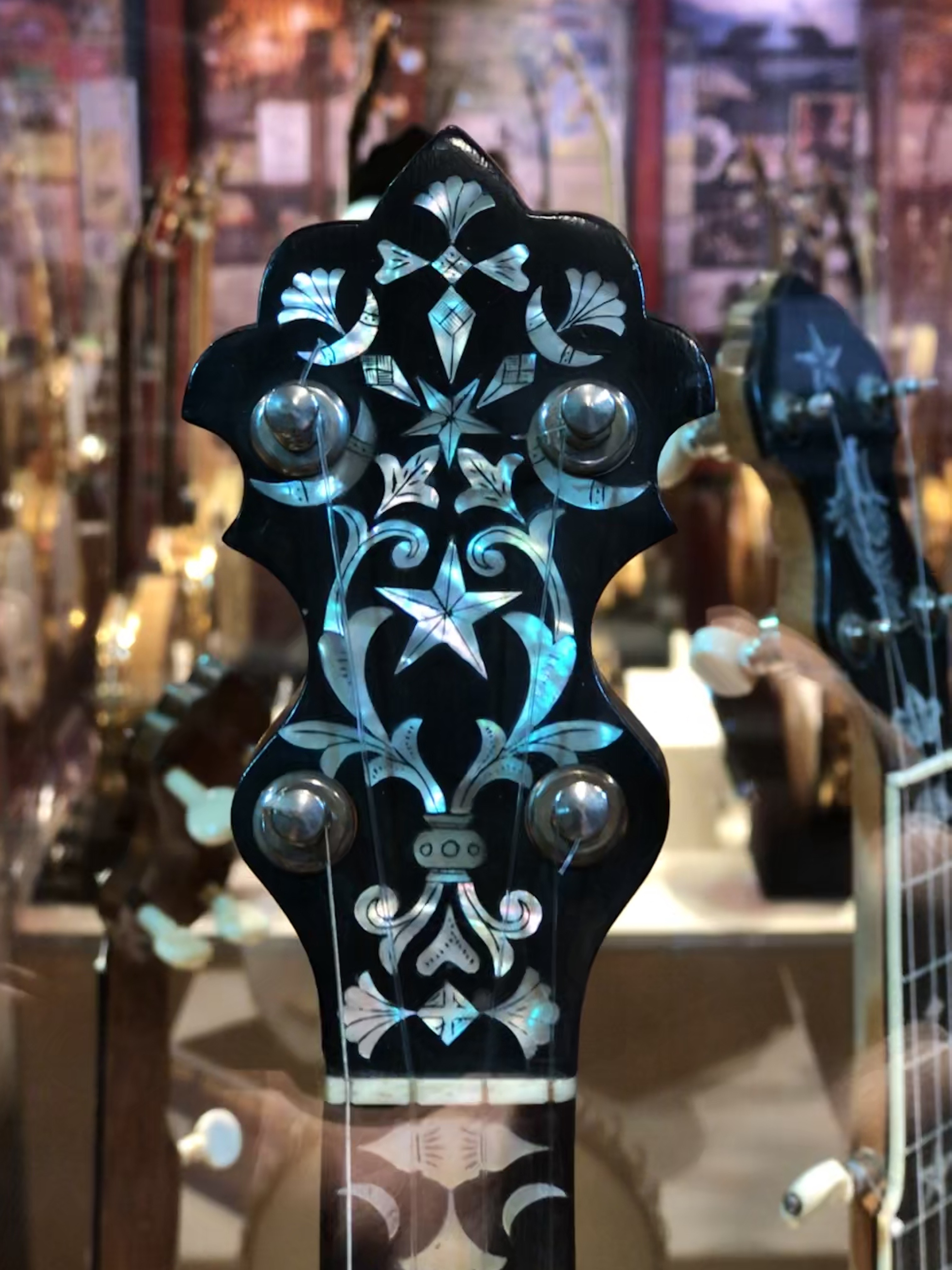
Headstock a S. S. Stewart Presentation Banjo sn 15667

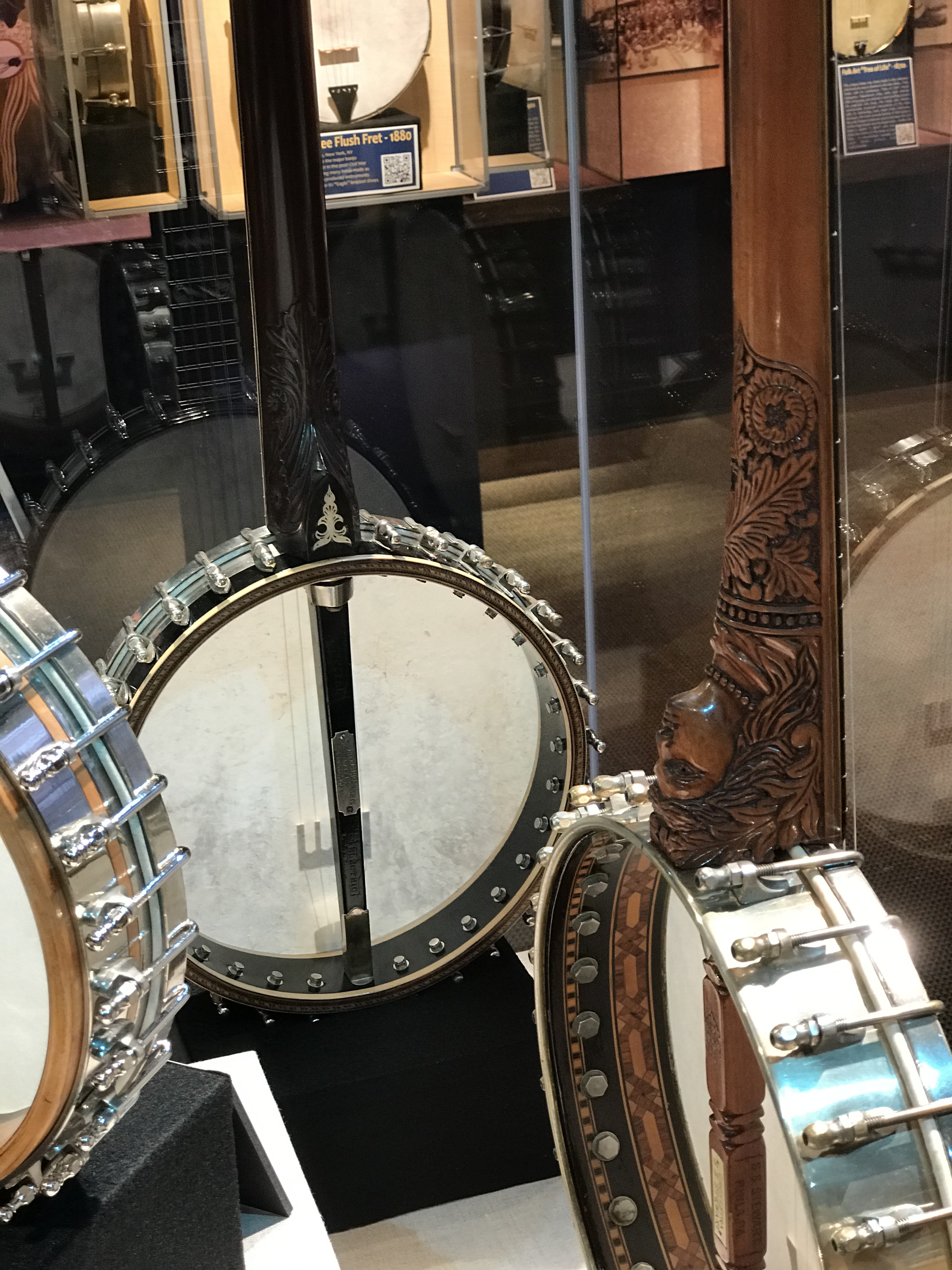
Pocahontas carving on neck of a S. S. Stewart Presentation Banjo, depicting Pocahontas

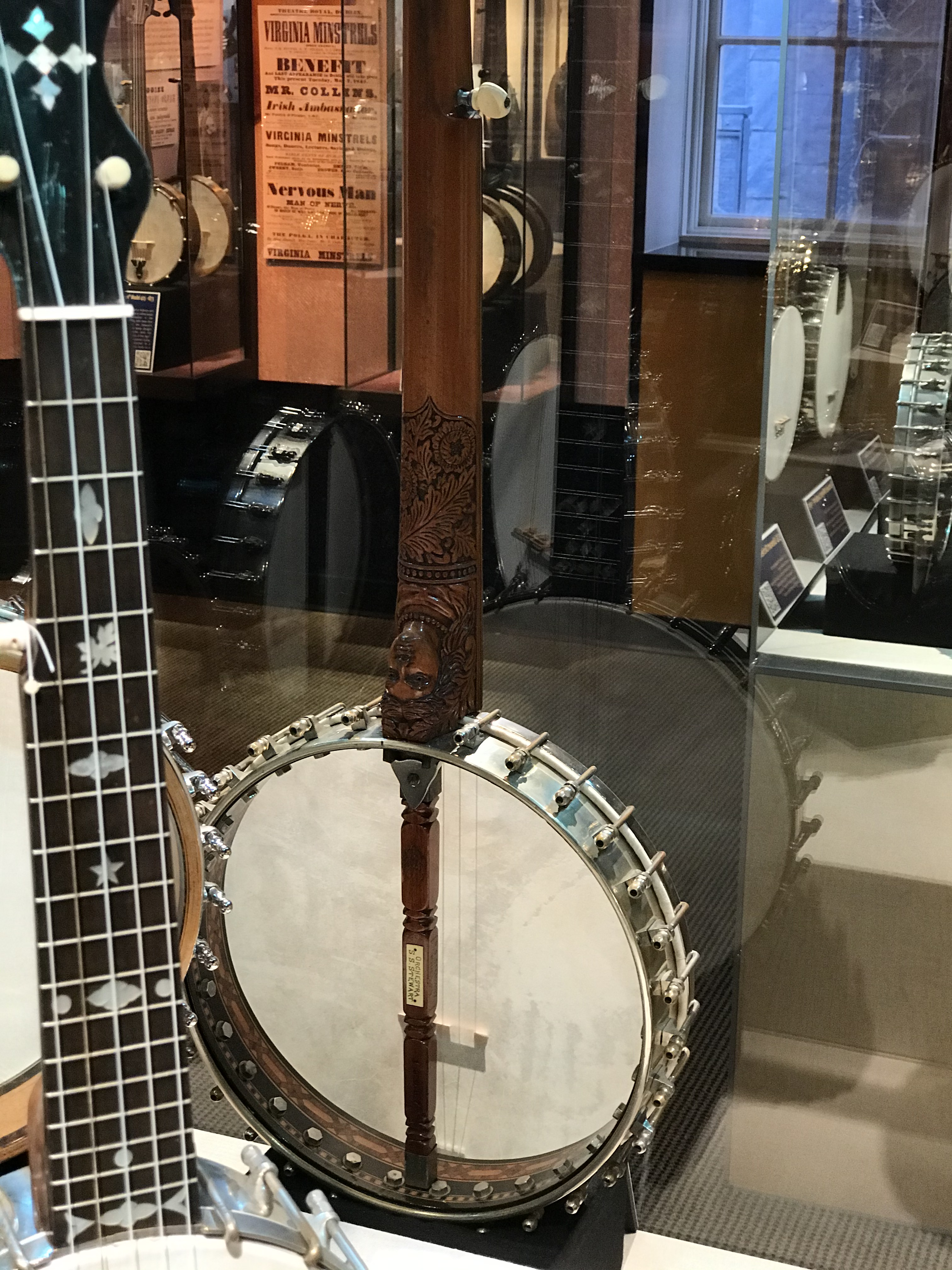
Rim of layered German silver and wood. Wood here is inlaid. Presentation banjos were meant to be fine works of art.

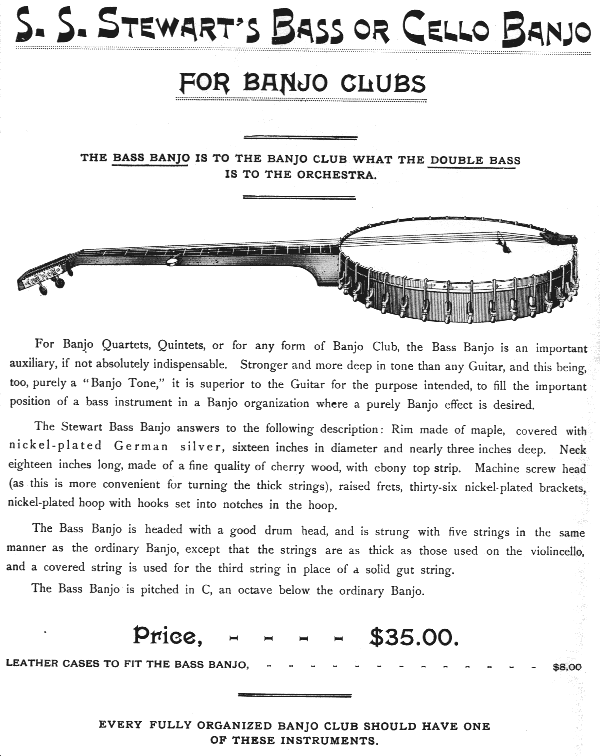
Advertisement taking about bass banjos

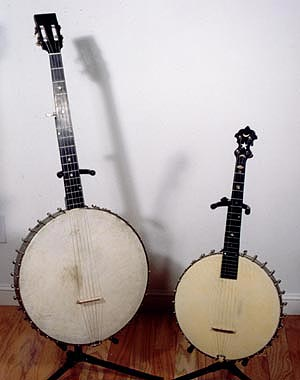
S. S. Stewart bass banjo (left) and banjeaurine. Stewart invented the banjeaurine for a higher or lead voice in banjo orchestras

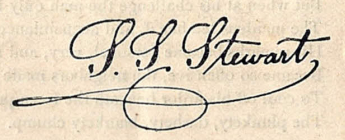
Signature of Samuel Swaim Stewart

== Swain versus Swaim ==
His full name has been written as:

- S. S. Stewart
- Samuel Swain Stewart
- Samuel Swaim Stewart
- Swain Stewart
- Swaim Stewart
- Swaim S. Stewart
- S. Swaim Stewart.

Swain appears on his obituary, on 8 April 1898 in the Philadelphia Times and in the 1860 U.S. census.

Swaim appears on his tombstone, on city directories from his lifetime (including 1879, 1880, 1889,), 1890, 1891, 1892, 1895), his church admission record in 1868, the 1870 U.S. census and US Patent number US355896A.
