= Arthur W. French =

American journalist and popular-song writer (1846-1916)

- Born: Arthur Wells French; January 19, 1846; Monroe, Connecticut, U.S.
- Died: January 27, 1916 (aged 70); Bridgeport, Connecticut
- Occupations: Journalist, songwriter
- Writing career
- Genre: parlor songs

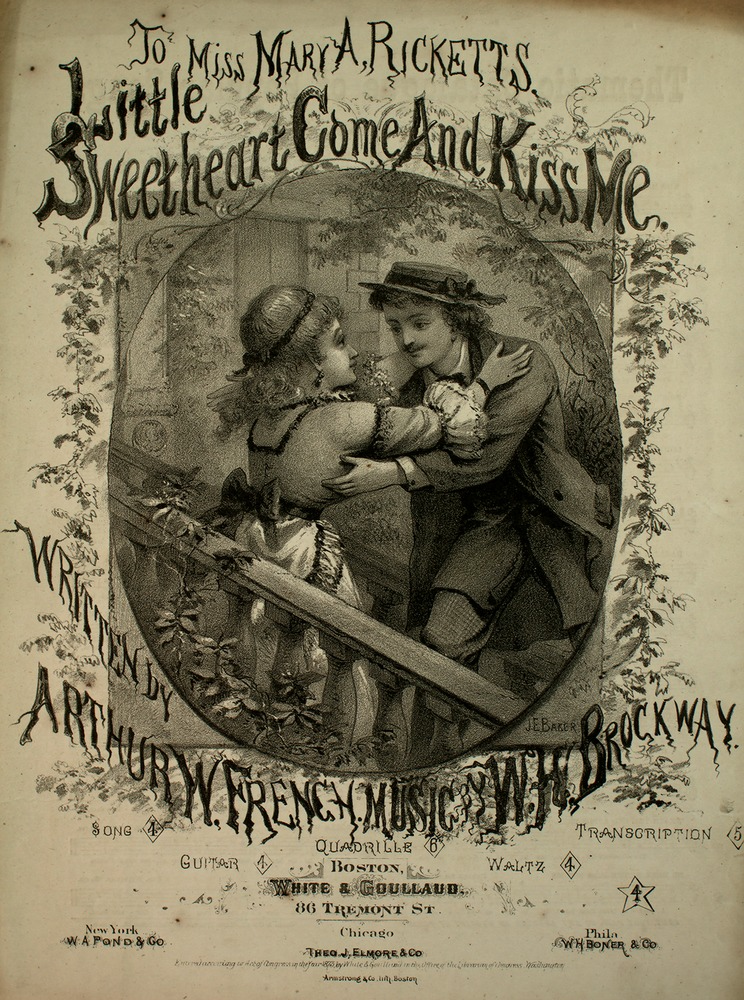
Cover of Little Sweetheart Come and Kiss Me

Arthur Wells French (1846–1916) was a journalist from Connecticut who was also a successful songwriter of sentimental songs in the 1870s and 1880s. Born in Monroe, Connecticut, he moved to Bridgeport as a young man. He was inclined to write, especially songs and poetry, "and this natural bent early led him into a newspaper career." His most successful work may have been "Little Sweetheart" sung by minstrel tenor Dave Wambold, which sold "several hundred thousand...copies" of sheet music.

As a journalist in Bridgeport, French worked for The Leader weekly newspaper, The Morning News, The Morning Union, The Standard, The Post and Telegram, and in Monroe for The Telegram and The Farmer.

His first song was printed in a newspaper. After that he sold songs to a "prominent composer" who adapted music to them and published them. In 1911, French estimated that he had written several hundred sheet music songs, and a similar number "for secular and sacred songbooks." He had kept track by making a continuous list of titles as he wrote them. He also wrote music to be performed in variety shows, minstrel shows, operettas and cantatas which were never published.

== Songs ==
LOC are scores preserved at the Library of Congress. LSMC are scores preserved at the Lester M. Levy Sheet Music Collection. BERK are scores at the California Sheet Music Project at the Berkeley Library. IMSLP are scores online at the IMSLP Petrucci Music Library.

French wrote lyrics for: Charlie Baker, Charles Dupree Blake (1847–1903), William H. Brockway, Robert Challoner, Devin Christie, Virginia Gabriel, William A. Huntley, Herbert Leslie, E. S. Paul, George W. Persely, C. M. Pyke, Charlie Rea, Henry Tucker, Horatio Williams

- 1871 LOC Barney A'leen. Words by Arthur W. French, music by George W. Persely.
- 1872 LOC Beautiful dreams linger near me. Words by Arthur M. French, music by Henry Tucker.
- 1872 LOC Darling take me back again. Words by Arthur M. French, music by Virginia Gabriel
- 1872 LOC Down among the daisies. Words by Arthur W. French, music by William A. Huntley.
- 1872 LOC Kiss me, love, before I go. Words by Arthur W. French, music by William A. Huntley.
- 1872 LOC Lilian Lee. Written and composed by Arthur W. French.
- 1872 LOC Under the silvery stars. Words by Arthur W. French, music by William A. Huntley.
- 1873 LOC Beautiful dreams never leave me. Composed by Arthur W. French, arranged by George W. Persely.
- 1873 LSMC Little sweetheart, come and kiss me. Words by Arthur W. French, music by W. H. Brockway.
- 1873 LOC Little sweetheart, come listen to me. Words and music by Arthur W. French.
- 1873 LOC Whisper farewell, Mollie dearest. Composed by Arthur W. French, arranged by George W. Persely.
- 1875 LOC Barney, take me home again. Composed by Arthur W. French, arranged by George W. Persely.
- 1875 LOC Clouds of intemperance. Words by Arthur M. French, music by Charles Dupree Blake.
- 1875 LOC Kiss, and forget, love. Words by Arthur M. French, music by Charles Dupree Blake.
- 1875 LOC LSMC Take me back to home and mother. Words by Arthur W. French, music by William A. Huntley.
- 1876 LOC Have you forgotten me darling. Composed by Arthur W. French, arranged by C. M. Pyke.
- 1876 LOC Only speak kindly to me. Words by Arthur W. French, music by C. M. Pyke.
- 1876 LOC They borrow, but never return!. Words and music by Arthur W. French.
- 1876 LOC The home of uncle Joe. Composed by Arthur W. French, arranged by George W. Persely.
- 1876 LOC Why can't I have a beau?
- 1878 LOC LOC Black eyed Binie's gone to rest. Words by Arthur W. French, music by William A. Huntley.
- 1878 LOC Flowers from home. Words by Arthur W. French, music by Albert Welling.
- 1878 LOC I am dreaming, sweetheart, dreaming. Composed by Arthur W. French, arranged by George W. Persely.
- 1878 LOC Just a sweet little word, Kathleen. Words by Arthur M. French, music by Charles Dupree Blake.
- 1878 LOC Little Valley Rose. Words by Arthur W. French, music by George Challoner.
- 1878 LOC When the birds have gone to sleep. Words by Arthur W. French, music by William A. Huntley.
- 1878 LOC When the blossoms cover us darling. Words by Arthur W. French, music by Charlie Baker.
- 1878 LOC Won't you. Words by Arthur W. French, music arranged and partly composed by Charlie Rea.
- 1879 LOC ' Mid lilies by the stream. Words by Arthur W. French, music by Charlie Rea.
- 1879 LOC Dat rascal of a poy. Words by Arthur W. French, music by Horatio Williams.
- 1879 LOC I'll meet you again little darling. Words by Arthur W. French, music by E. S. Paul.
- 1879 LOC Just because you kissed me, darling. Composed by Arthur W. French, music by Devin Christie.
- 1879 IMSLP BERK Some Day I'll Wander Back Again. Words by Arthur W. French, music by William A. Huntley.
- 1880 BERK Bye and bye you will forget me. Words by Arthur W. French, music by William A Huntley.
- 1880 LOC Mora Marie. Words by Arthur W. French, music by Herbert Leslie.
- 1883 LOC Little one, whisper you love me. Words by Arthur W. French, music by William A Huntley.
- 1883 LOC Must we leave the old home, mother?. Words by Arthur W. French, music by William A Huntley.
- 1885 LOC Barney A'leen. Composed by Arthur W. French, arranged by George W. Persely.

== Recordings ==
Some of French's songs were recorded in the early 20th century:

- 1910 LOC Trabbling back to Georgia. Composed by Charles D. Blake, sung by baritone Carroll Clark, words by Arthur W. French.
- 1913 LOC By and by you will forget me. Words by Arthur W. French, composed by William A. Huntley, contralto vocal by Elsie Baker, baritone vocal by Frederick J. Wheeler.
- 1914 LOC Someday I'll wander back again. Words by Arthur W. French, composed by William A. Huntley, tenor vocal by Harry McClaskey (also known as Henry Burr).
