= Banjeaurine =

Miniature variant of the banjo

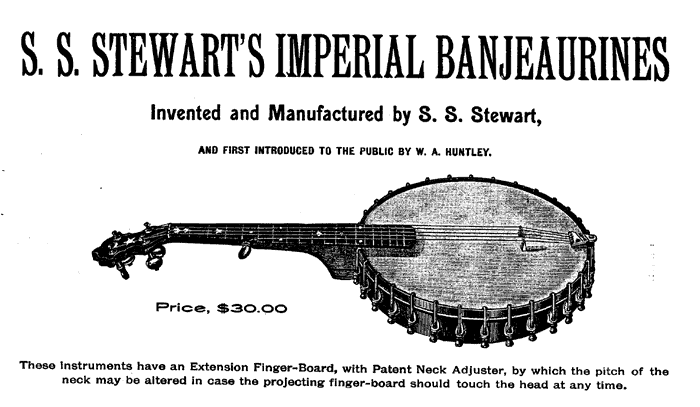
1898 S.S. Stewart catalog

The banjeaurine, also spelled banjourine or banjorine, is essentially a mini banjo, designed to play lead instrument in banjo orchestras from the 1890s to the 1930s.

The banjeaurine was invented by Samuel Swaim Stewart, owner of the S.S. Stewart Banjo Company in Philadelphia. The new instrument first hit the music scene in 1885, played before the public by William A. Huntley.

A higher pitched version of the conventional 5-string banjo, the banjeaurine soon became an essential part of banjo orchestras, where it was responsible for the majority of the solos in musical pieces. There were normally two of these instruments in a typical banjo orchestra.

The banjeaurine has a shorter neck than traditional banjos, with a scale between 19" and 20", a fretboard extension that is cantilevered over the head, and either 17 or 19 frets. Most banjeaurines, especially early ones, have 12"- to 12-1/2"-diameter rims. Later models may have 11" rims, a size that became a standard banjo rim size during the late 1920s. The body has a top made out of skin, real or synthetic, and usually an open back without a resonator. The banjeaurine has five strings, one of which is shorter than the others and is called the fifth string or thumb string. The banjeaurine is tuned a fourth higher than the standard banjo (or like a Standard Banjo w/ a Capo on the 5th Fret), at open C major.

Most notably constructed by Stewart, banjeaurines were also offered by other major banjo manufacturers, including Washburn, Fairbanks, Fairbanks & Cole, Cole, Vega, Weyman, Schall, Thompson & Odell, Kraske, and Lyon & Healy.

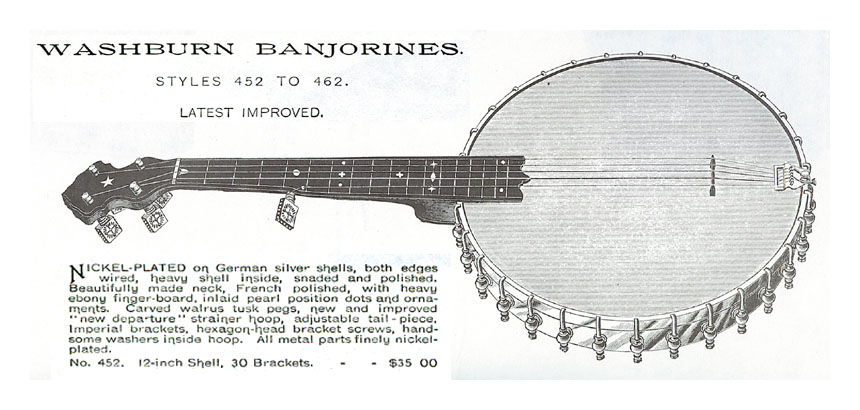
1892 Washburn catalog

Gold Tone, Vangoa, and several other banjo companies currently make these instruments as mini banjos.
