= James Unsworth (cricketer) =

English cricketer

James Unsworth (4 March 1844 – 1 January 1893) was an English cricketer. He was a right-handed batsman and a right-arm roundarm bowler who played for Lancashire.

Unsworth was born in the Everton district of Liverpool. His early club cricket career was spent with Everton Cricket Club in 1865, before he moved on to Anfield Club, New Brighton and Huyton - where he spent nine years.

Unsworth made two first-class appearances for Lancashire during 1871. He scored 2 and 23 on his debut against Kent, taking three wickets in the first innings in which he bowled. In Unsworth's second and final appearance, he scored a duck in a ten wicket victory for Lancashire.

Following the close of his first-class career, he became a landlord. He died in Warrington, Lancashire.
