= Edward Le Roy Rice =

American minstrel performers and producer, writer (1871–1938)

Edward LeRoy Rice
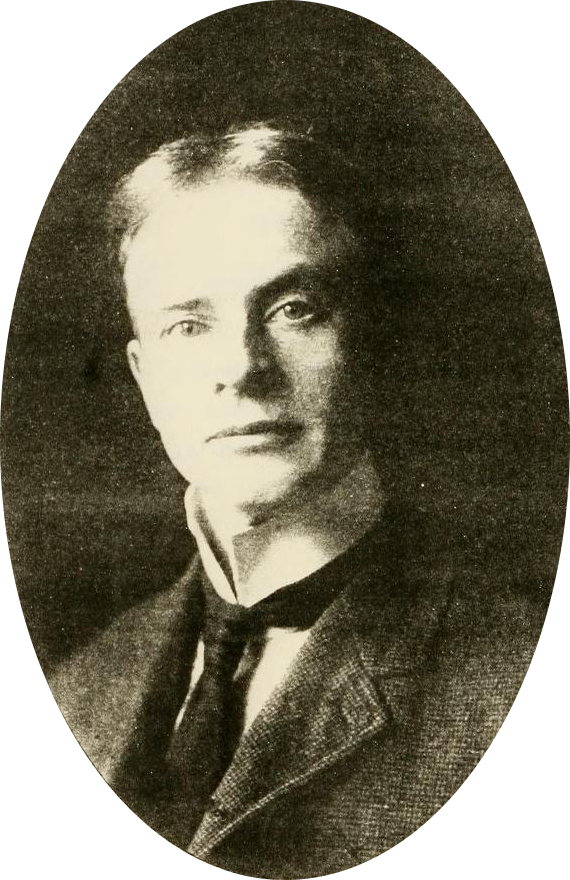
- Rice in 1911
- Born: August 24, 1871; Manhattan, New York City, New York, U.S.
- Died: December 1, 1938 (aged 67); Manhattan, New York City, New York, U.S.
- Spouse: Emma Rodenberger
- Parent: William Henry Rice (1844–1907)

Edward LeRoy Rice (August 24, 1871 – December 1, 1938) was an American performer in and producer of minstrel shows. He was the leading authority on the history of minstrel shows. He also bought and sold theatrical memorabilia.

== Biography ==
He was born in Manhattan, New York City, on August 24, 1871, as the second son of William Henry Rice (1844–1907), a minstrel performer. He first performed on stage in Morristown, New Jersey, on July 18, 1890.

He married Emma Rodenberger in Brooklyn, New York City, on November 30, 1899.

Starting in 1907, he wrote a column, "Man in the Bleachers", which ran in the New York Evening World for five weeks.

His book Monarchs of Minstrelsy was published in 1911. He wrote a syndicated column for Press Publishing called "Anecdotes of Old-Time Actors, by 1913.

He died on December 1, 1938, in Manhattan. He was buried at Calvary Cemetery in Woodside, New York. His archive is housed at Princeton University in Princeton, New Jersey.

== Quote ==
- "Let me begin by saying that I am not a "Monarch of Minstrelsy," not even ... I can remember, as a youngster even before my school days began, my father asking me if I wanted to be a minstrel."
