= John Diamond (dancer) =

Irish-American dancer

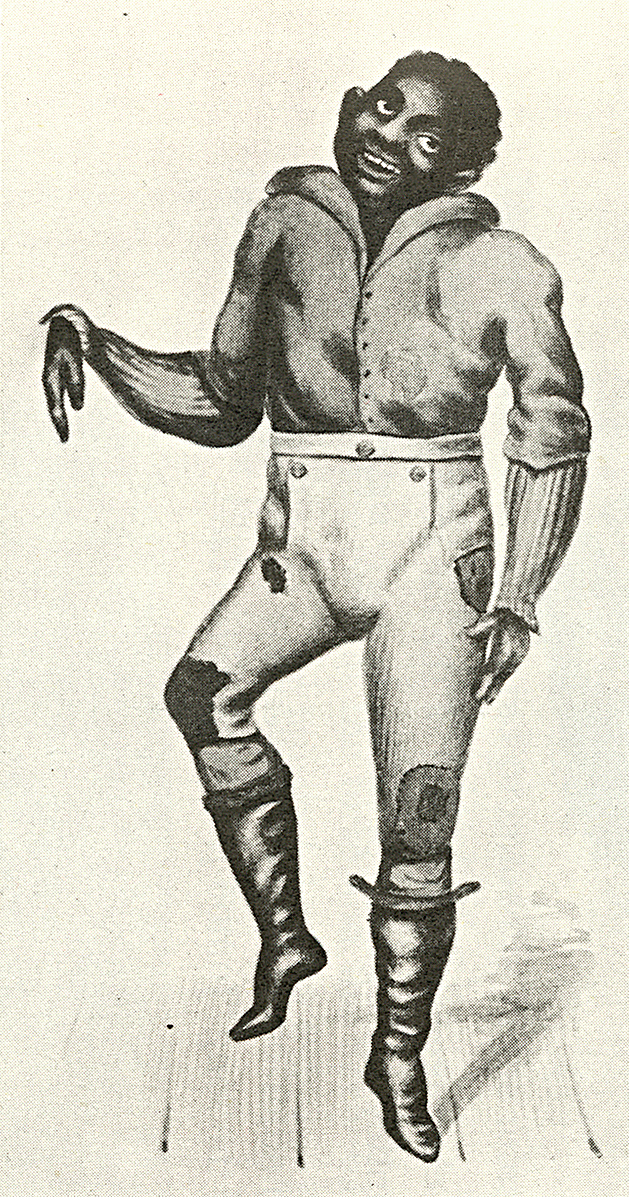
John Diamond dancing, from Records of the New York Stage, vol. 2, Part 7, by Joseph N. Ireland.

John Diamond (c. 1823 – October 20, 1857), a.k.a. Jack or Johnny, was an Irish-American dancer and blackface minstrel performer. Diamond entered show business at age 17 and soon came to the attention of circus promoter P. T. Barnum. In less than a year, Diamond and Barnum had a falling-out, and Diamond left to perform with other blackface performers. Diamond's dance style merged elements of English, Irish, and African dance. For the most part, he performed in blackface and sang popular minstrel tunes or accompanied a singer or instrumentalist. Diamond's movements emphasized lower-body movements and rapid footwork with little movement above the waist.

Diamond was most famous for a series of challenge dances. He regularly advertised that he could defeat all comers in a dancing contest, and he made good on his boasts. However, Diamond soon came to the attention of the dancer whom Barnum had replaced him with, a young black man known as Master Juba. Diamond and Juba fought dance-offs through the mid-1840s; records indicate that Juba won all but one. Accordingly, historian Robert Toll calls Diamond the "greatest white minstrel dancer".

== Career ==
In 1840, Diamond won $500 in a New York City jig competition. Circus proprietor P. T. Barnum took notice and hired the boy, touring him throughout the United States and Europe. Ever the showman, Barnum claimed that the dancer was a mere 12 years old (he was really 17) and billed him as the "King of Diamonds" in advertisements. Diamond performed solo and as part of a pair with blackface singers and musicians. For a time, he was teamed with "the King of Banjo players, and the Emperor of Extravaganza Singers", Billy Whitlock. Their advertisements exclaimed, "Second night of the engagement of the little 'Wirginny Nigger,' only 12 years old, who can outdance the nation, and come some 'Heel and Toe Breakdowns,' that are a caution to all darkies, and no mistake!"

Diamond earned a bad reputation among promoters and managers. One source claimed that his dancing was "considerably better than his temper and disposition." In February 1841, Diamond extorted money from P. T. Barnum and deserted his former mentor to go on a week-long binge of alcohol and women. Barnum sent a letter to his colleagues to caution them against hiring the dancer. Barnum claimed Diamond had "overdrawn the money due him to the amount of $95 and has during the last week expended a hundred dollars in brothels and haunts of dissipation & vice."

Free of Barnum, Diamond played in pairs or groups of three or four blackface performers. In January 1843, he was in a circus with other blackface performers; the program promised "Negro extravaganzas, songs, dances, and locomotive imitations by Whitlock, Diamond, John Daniels and Gardner." The program does not make it clear whether they performed simultaneously or individually. After the Virginia Minstrels formed in 1843, Whitlock convinced Diamond to perform with them in order to increase the group's exposure. In 1845, Diamond was touring the United States with the Old Dominion Circus. In 1849, he was touring with the Olympic Circus. He was still performing regularly in the mid 1850s. Diamond eventually joined the Ethiopian Serenaders minstrel troupe.

== Challenge dances ==
In the 1840s, Diamond began a series of challenge dances wherein he dared his rivals to best him in a contest of skill. Diamond publicized his challenges in popular newspapers. Such trials usually had three judges, one who judged time, one style, and one execution. A typical challenge read:

Master Diamond, who delineates the Ethiopian character superior to any other white person, hereby challenges any person in the world to trial of skill at Negro dancing, in all its varieties, for a wager of from $200.00–$1,000.00.

Diamond won match after match in city after city, and his fame grew exponentially. He earned a host of imitators and copycats, many of whom took his name and pretended to be him.

After their inamicable split, Barnum had replaced Diamond with a young, unknown black man named William Henry Lane. The new protégé took the stage name "Master Juba" and centered his act on imitations of "all the principal dancers in the United States", followed by his own style. Diamond was always the last dancer Juba imitated, as the Irish-American was Juba's only real rival.

Diamond and Juba's war of steps reached a fever pitch when the two agreed to a challenge dance against one another. A series of widely advertised Diamond–Juba dance-offs followed:

Excitement among the Sporting Community—Match between John Diamond and Juba.

The favorites are now the dancers, and he who can cut, shuffle, and attitudanize [sic] with the greatest facility is reckoned the best fellow and pockets the most money.

Match dances are very frequently got up, and seem to give general satisfaction, if we are allowed to judge from the crowds who throng to witness them.

We have not had a real, scientific, out-and-out trial of skill since that between Dick Pelham and John Diamond at the Chatham; but it appears we are soon to have another of these refined and elevating exhibitions.

A match has been made between John Diamond and a little negro called "Juba," by some of the sporting community, and is to come off in the course of a few weeks. The stake is large, and an unparalleled display will be the result.

The Diamond–Juba dance-offs continued through the mid-1840s. Existing records show that Diamond lost all but one.

== Dance style ==
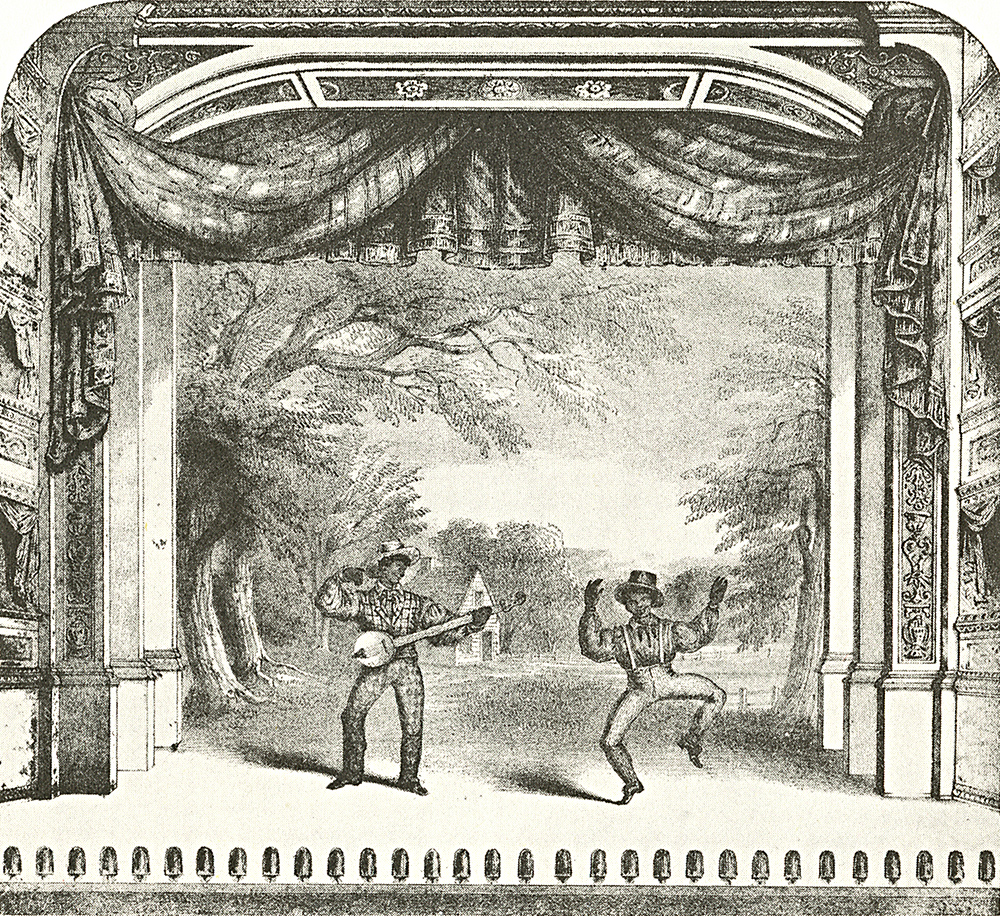
John Diamond's dances involved acrobatic footwork, as shown in this detail from the sheet music cover of Whitlock's Collection of Ethiopian Melodies, 1846. The banjoist is Billy Whitlock, but it is unclear whether the dancer is John Diamond or Frank Diamond.

Diamond's repertoire was a mixture of African American, English, and Irish steps. He danced the "five mile out of town dance", the "Long Island breakdown", the "Negro camptown hornpipe", the "ole Virginna breakdown", and the "smokehouse dance". A playbill claimed that his "rattle snake jig" had 120 steps. The steps and maneuvers that made up these dances had equally colorful names; his hornpipe featured the "double shuffle", the "heel and toe", the "pigeon wing", and "running on his heels". His energetic breakdowns were among his more famous dances. Diamond performed in blackface, but some of his dances were strictly British or Irish in origin and were danced without makeup. Examples of these were an Irish jig called the "fireman's hornpipe" and the "naval hornpipe in the character of a Yankee sailor".

Diamond's dances were characterized by little upper-body movement and rapid footwork. He left his upper body relaxed so as to bring attention to his feet. One characteristic step was to lean forward and dangle his hands loosely, look to the side, and slide across the stage with a heel–toe alternation. Noah M. Ludlow, a theatre manager, wrote that "He could twist his feet and legs, while dancing, into more fantastic forms than I ever witnessed before or since in any human being." His playbills proclaimed Diamond a performer of "the greatest display of heel and toe genus [sic] ever witnessed" and that "Now de heels, if dares any music in you, its [sic] got to come out". Diamond's rapid footwork rapped out percussive patterns on the floor. He advertised that he could create music with his heels.

Diamond's act also incorporated singing, either by a partner or by Diamond himself. When partnered with a banjoist, Diamond danced and leapt about the stage while the musician played. These acts involved precise choreography. His repertoire consisted of popular blackface numbers, such as "Jim-a-Long-Josey". He performed stump speeches as well, such as his "Negro speech in Congress".
