= Billy Whitlock =

American blackface performer and banjo player

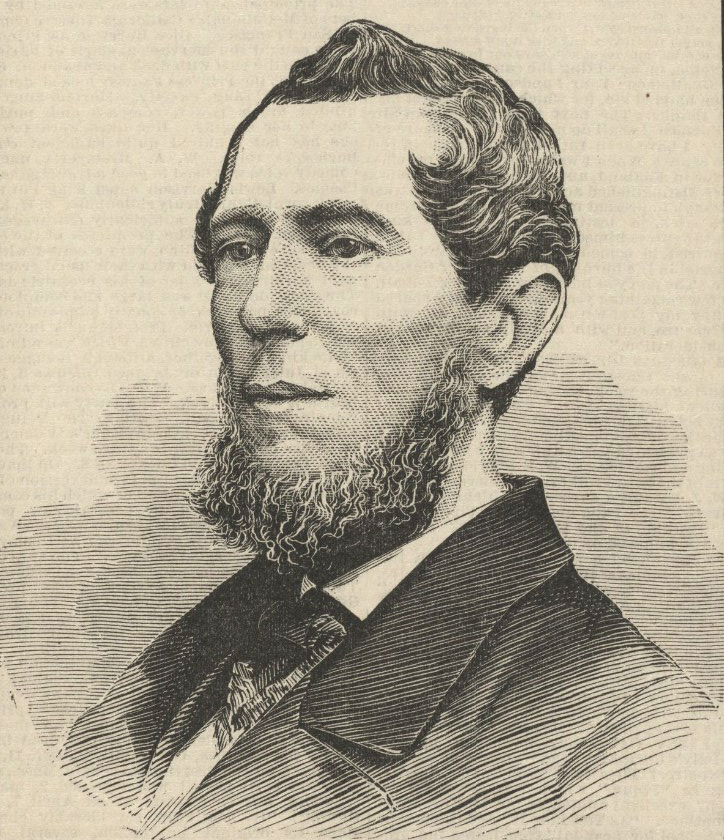
- Whitlock in 1846
- Born: c. 1813; New York City
- Died: 1878 (aged 64–65)
- Occupation: Circus performer
- Known for: Virginia Minstrels

William M. Whitlock (c. 1813 – 1878) was an American blackface performer. He began his career in entertainment doing blackface banjo routines in circuses and dime shows, and by 1843 he was well known in New York City. He is best known for his role in forming the original minstrel show troupe, the Virginia Minstrels.

== Early career ==
Whitlock was born in New York City in about 1813. He worked as a typesetter for a religious journal, then went to work for the New York Herald. Whitlock claimed to have met America's pre-eminent banjoist, Joel Sweeney, in 1838 and to have taken some banjo lessons from him. He joined P. T. Barnum's circus in 1839, where he began his blackface act.

By 1840, Whitlock was performing circuses, museums, and variety shows and had taken the epithet "King of Banjo players, and the Emperor of Extravaganza Singers". He paired with John Diamond for a time, playing banjo and singing while Diamond danced. Frank Lynch eventually replaced Diamond, though he took "Frank Diamond" as his stage name. Whitlock also partnered with Dan Gardner, who would dress in drag as Whitlock's character "Sambo Squash" made romantic overtures.

This playbill, written in the stereotyped African American Vernacular English that characterized blackface entertainment, describes Whitlock's basic act:

Now dat Massa Whitlock plays so partic'lar combustious, and will sing dat 'fecting song of Jinny git your Hoe Cake done! and dat first rate ballad of Jim Along Josey! defying all de niggers in de world to charm de people after dat same manner. Dis very partic'lar nigga will jump, dance, and knock his heels in a way dat Mademoiselle Fanny Elssler neber did, neber can and neber will do.

Many years later, Whitlock claimed that his Negro impersonations were based on reality. He would "quietly steal off to some negro hut to hear the darkeys sing and see them dance, taking with him a jug of whiskey to make them all the merrier."

== Virginia Minstrels ==
In early 1843, Whitlock became one of the founding members of the Virginia Minstrels. Whitlock's version of the group's founding holds that Whitlock asked fiddler Dan Emmett to practice with him. They did so on a few occasions, but during one such session, Frank Brower dropped by unannounced and decided to join in on bones. Richard Pelham soon followed with his tambourine.

The Virginia Minstrels put on a full minstrel show at the New York Bowery Amphitheatre on 6 February 1843. Whitlock was the most famous of the foursome, but soon all four names became well known as they toured New York and Boston. Whitlock's banjo was long-necked and four-stringed, though a fifth was added by 1844. He played the instrument by striking the strings with his fingernail. Whitlock also did a "Locomotive Lecture", a predecessor to the stump speech, wherein he feigned a complete lack of knowledge about steam engines and the railroad. Whitlock wrote some music, as well; his "Miss Lucy Long" became a hit for both the Virginia Minstrels and Christy's Minstrels.

Whitlock and the troupe left for Liverpool, on April 21. They performed several minstrel shows in the British Isles, but they broke up after a performance on July 14, 1843, possibly due to low profits. Whitlock returned to New York City with the group's manager, George Wooldridge.

== Later career ==
Back in America, Whitlock returned to his circus blackface act. For a time, he joined T. G. Booth, Cool White, and Barney Williams as a member of the Kentucky Minstrels.

On July 28, 1845, Whitlock joined Emmett, Jerry Bryant's Minstrels, Dan Gardner, and Charles "Charlie" White to form the Operatic Brothers and Sisters. The group put on a week of outdoor performances in Hoboken, New Jersey. On October 23, he performed at a benefit concert along with Emmett, Gardner, and other prominent blackface entertainers. His last public blackface performance was at a circus in 1855.
