= Polly Wolly Doodle =

American song

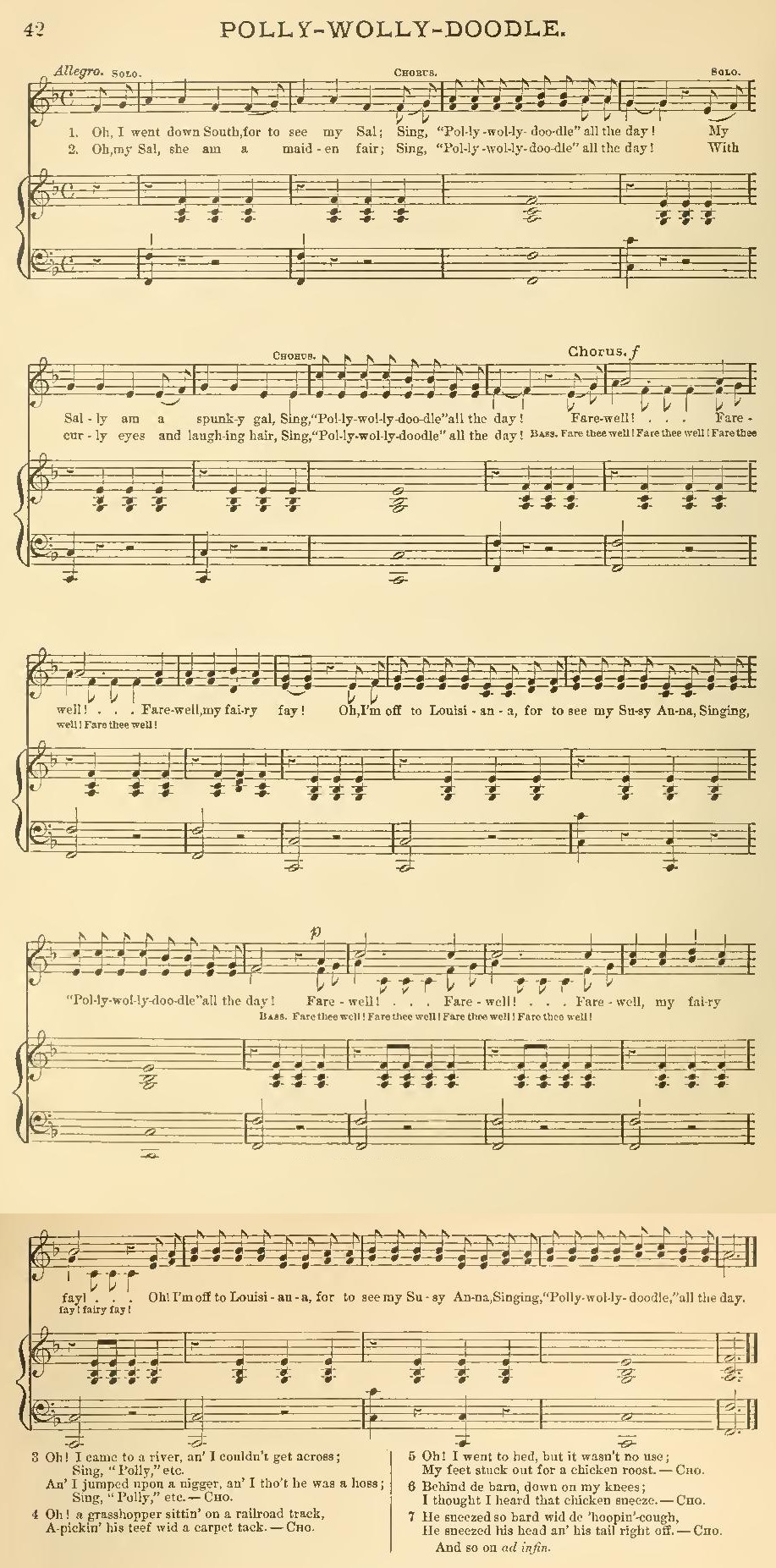
- Polly Wolly Doodle in Student's Songs, Cambridge Mass. 1884

Song
- Published: 1843

Polly Wolly Doodle

"Polly Wolly Doodle" is an American minstrel song that became a popular children's song. It was sung by Dan Emmett's Virginia Minstrels, who premiered the song at New York's Bowery Amphitheatre in February 1843, and is often credited to Emmett (1815–1904).

The melody of the song, as it is usually sung, formed the basis for Francis Blanche's 1946 song (recorded by Lily Fayol) "Le Gros Bill", Boney M.'s hit "Hooray! Hooray! It's a Holi-Holiday" in 1979, as well as for Alexandra Burke's song "Start Without You". The tune is also found in children's music, including the Sunday school song "O-B-E-D-I-E-N-C-E", "Radio Lollipop" by the German group die Lollipops, the Cantonese song 道理真巧妙, and the Barney & Friends songs "Alphabet Soup" (using only the tune of the first verse) and "If I Had One Wish" (which uses both verses).

== Notable recordings ==
- 1878: Yale Glee Club
- 1917: Harry C. Browne
- 1926: Gid Tanner and the Skillet Lickers (as "Polly Wolly Doo")
- 1939: Carter Family (as "Polly Wolly Doodle All Day")
- 1951: Pete Seeger
- 1964: Burl Ives
- 1979: Boney M. (as "Hooray! Hooray! It's a Holi-Holiday")

== Parodies ==
In his medley "Schticks of One and Half a Dozen of the Other" (1963), Allan Sherman sings a song using the "Polly Wolly Doodle" tune, with lyrics describing his attempts to lose weight ("Oh, I diet all day and I diet all night / It's enough to drive me bats...")

The song "On the Picket Line" used this tune. It was sung by labor union members and organizers to encourage participation in strikes and picket line actions, and was included in the Industrial Workers of the World's Little Red Songbook.
