= Frank Brower =

American entertainer

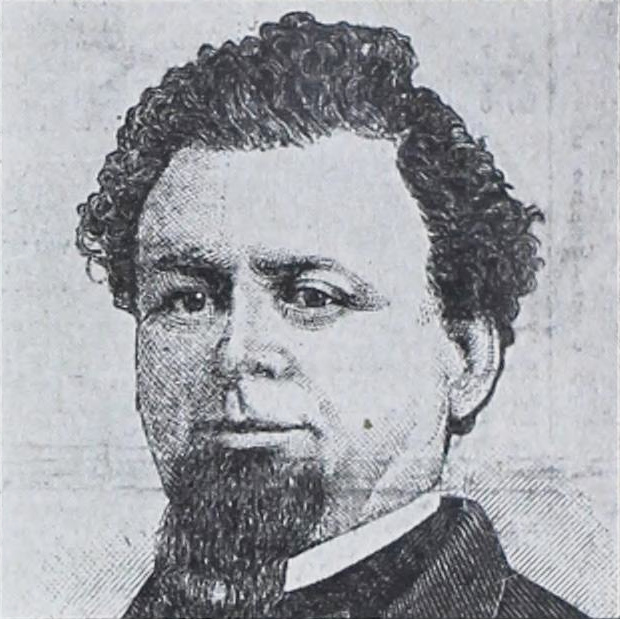
Frank Brower

Francis Marion Brower (November 20, 1823 – June 4, 1874) was an American blackface performer active in the mid-19th century. Brower began performing blackface song-and-dance acts in circuses and variety shows when he was 13. He eventually introduced the bones to his act, helping to popularize it as a blackface instrument. Brower teamed with various other performers, forming his longest association with banjoist Dan Emmett beginning in 1841. Brower earned a reputation as a gifted dancer. In 1842, Brower and Emmett moved to New York City. They were out of work by January 1843, when they teamed up with Billy Whitlock and Richard Pelham to form the Virginia Minstrels. The group was the first to perform a full minstrel show as a complete evening's entertainment. Brower pioneered the role of the endman.

After a successful tour in the British Isles, Brower returned to the United States and teamed with Emmett and other blackface performers for a time. In the 1850s, he left minstrelsy to work in the Tom shows based on Uncle Tom's Cabin. He returned to minstrelsy briefly as the decade closed and nostalgia for the old minstrel show came into fashion. In 1867, Brower retired from show business and opened a saloon.

== Early life and career ==
Francis Marion Brower was born on November 20, 1823, in Baltimore, Maryland. Brower began his career at age 13, first performing at Dick Meyer's Third and Chestnut Streets Museum in Philadelphia, Pennsylvania. Brower claimed to have learned to dance from black people, and he took to doing song-and-dance blackface performances in circuses and theatres. For the 1840 season, Brower toured with the Cincinnati Circus Company, paired with a banjoist named Ferguson. The two became the stars of the show.

In 1841, Brower teamed up with banjoist Dan Emmett, who had been playing banjo in the circus orchestra. Brower took up the playing of the bones, making him one of the earliest to marry the instrument with blackface theater. The following season, Brower and Emmett toured with Raymond and Waring's Circus. The duo became well known, and Brower earned a reputation as a first-tier dancer. Brower's introduction of acrobatic leaps to the stage caught on with other blackface performers. His act was well enough known that Master Juba (William Henry Lane) did an impression of Brower dancing (an 1845 playbill for the Ethiopian Minstrels, with whom Juba was touring, lists Brower as the fifth ranked dancer in Juba's show).

In November 1842, Brower and Emmett moved their act to New York City. They played a variety house called the Franklin Theatre in Chatham Square and added a young dancer named Pierce to the act. Emmett likely played banjo as Brower and Pierce danced. All three likely sang. The New York Herald on December 4, 1842 called Brower "the perfect representation of the Southern Negro characters". By mid-December, Brower quit the trio, but he and Emmett had reteamed by January 1 in a show billed as "Negro Holiday Sports in Carolina and Virginia".

== The Virginia Minstrels ==
That same month, Brower and Emmett were out of work. They joined two other blackface performers—Richard Pelham, and Billy Whitlock—to form the Virginia Minstrels, the first group of blackface performers to put on a full minstrel show. Brower took the role of one of the minstrel endmen and played the bones. His performance style was characterized by wild poses and antics while he played, and he and fellow endman Dick Pelham, the featured dancers, broke into "Virginia Breakdown" dances. Brower wrote some songs for the troupe, including "Old Joe" in 1844; he did a stump speech called "Definition of the Bankrupt Laws".

== Later career ==
When the Virginia Minstrels broke up in 1843, Brower and banjoist Joel Sweeney joined Cooke's Royal Circus. He and Emmett eventually returned to the United States, arriving on October 7, 1844. They found two more blackface performers and formed a new band, playing at the Lyceum Hall in Salem, Massachusetts, on October 23. The group traveled to Boston and played the Melodeon as the "Legitimate Ethiopian Band". Emmett and Brower toured together on and off into 1846. In 1851, Brower went to England and performed as a clown in Welch's Circus Company.

In 1854, Brower took the role of Uncle Tom in the Bowery Theatre's Tom show staging of Uncle Tom's Cabin (a role vacated by Thomas D. Rice). The production, dubbed "Happy Uncle Tom" featured Brower as a deaf Uncle Tom and relied on broad humor about deafness for its appeal. Brower also performed a banjo song and jig during the show. Brower briefly returned to minstrelsy in the late 1850s when several companies introduced a nostalgic program derived from minstrelsy's early years. For example, in January 1859, he joined Sanford's Opera Troupe in Philadelphia for a two-week engagement during which he did his "original Tom Dance and Reel". The Sanfords gave him a benefit in October 1855. "Uncle Frank" Brower retired from show business in 1867 after breaking his leg. He spent his final years running a saloon. Brower died in Philadelphia, Pennsylvania, on June 4, 1874, after an illness lasting two months.
