= Ethiopian Serenaders =

American blackface minstrel troupe

The Ethiopian Serenaders
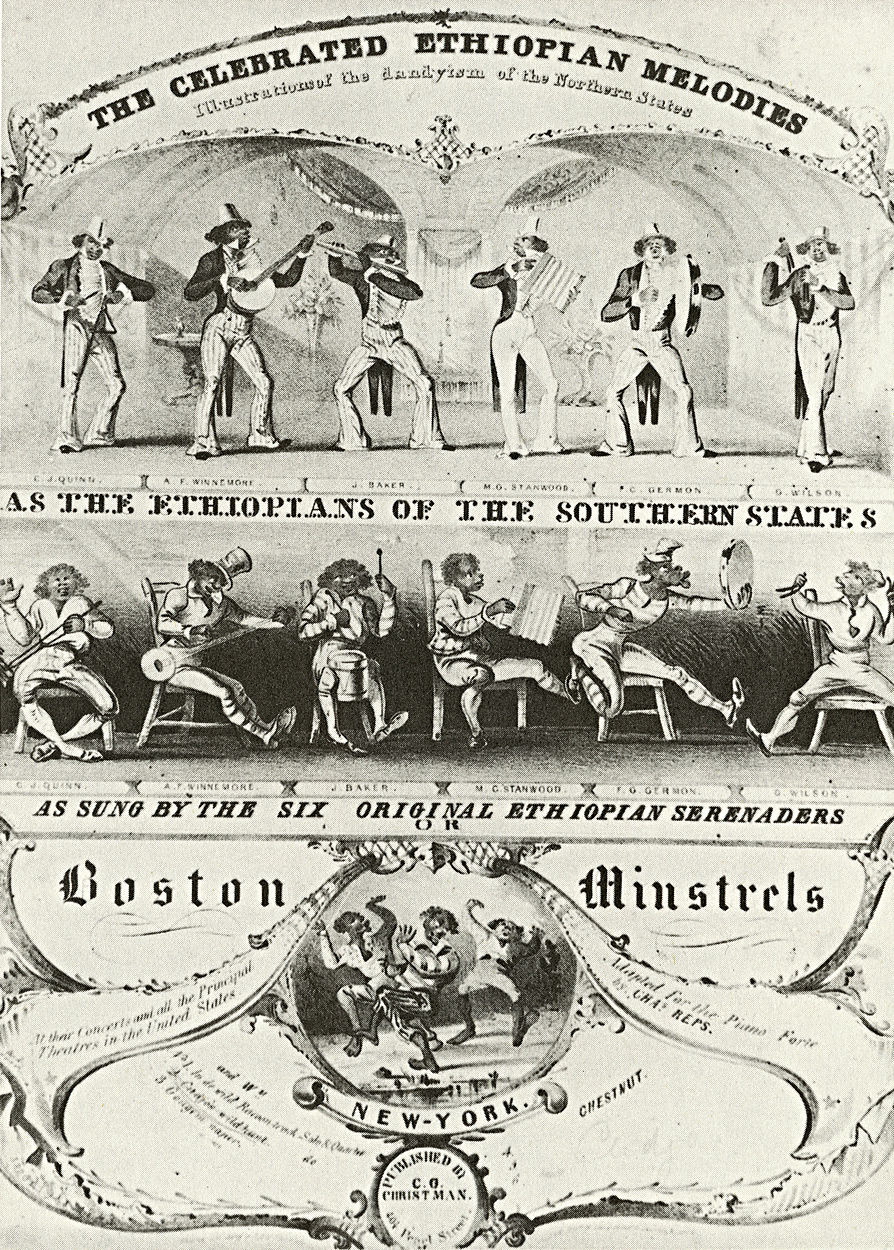
- Sheet music cover featuring the Ethiopian Serenaders (here billed as the "Boston Minstrels"), New York, 1843

Background information
- Also known as: Dumbolton's Serenaders
- Origin: Boston, Massachusetts, U.S.
- Genres: Minstrel show
- Years active: c.1840–1860s
- Past members: Francis Carr Germon; Moody G. Stanwood; Anthony Fannen Winnemore; E. J. Quinn; J. Baker; G. Wilson; Gilbert Pelham; George Alfred Harrington; George Warren White; William Henry Lane ("Juba"); Thomas F. Briggs; J. H. Everton; James H. Irwin; M. C. Ludlow; J. W. Valintine; Cool White; Emmett etc.

The Ethiopian Serenaders was an American blackface minstrel troupe successful in the 1840s and 1850s. Through various line-ups they were managed and directed by James A. Dumbolton (c.1808–?), and are sometimes mentioned as the Boston Minstrels, Dumbolton Company or Dumbolton's Serenaders.

== Origins ==
The group was formed in Boston, Massachusetts, becoming the first in the city to play "concerted negro music", before performing at the Chatham Theatre in New York City. Under Dumbolton's management, the original line-up included Francis Carr Germon, Moody G. Stanwood, Anthony Fannen (Tony) Winnemore, E. J. Quinn, J. Baker, and G. Wilson. Their first major performance was for John Tyler at the White House in 1844 as part of the "Especial Amusement of the President of the United States, His Family and Friends".

After this success, the troupe altered its act to make it more "refined" and to appeal to a higher-class audience than had traditionally patronized blackface entertainment. They billed their shows as blackface "concerts" and added songs of a sentimental, romantic nature, even going so far as to perform pieces from popular operas. In exchange, they cut out bawdy, humorous material like that used by the Virginia Minstrels and other troupes, and saw great success with this formula. According to Dwight's Journal of Music, they "popularized 'Rosa Lee', 'Dearest Mae', 'Mary Blane', &c., a species of composition more nearly bordering upon respectability than the characteristic negro songs by which they had been preceded."

== First British tour ==
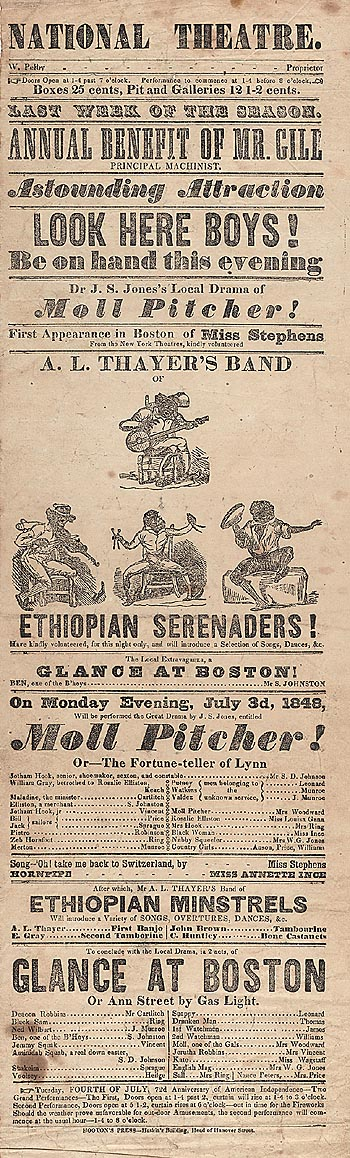

In late 1845, with line-up changes but retaining Germon and Stanwood, the Serenaders left for a tour in England (and possibly Ireland). An advertisement in The Times referred to their first concert, to be held at the Hanover Square Rooms on 21 January 1846. The performers were Francis Carr Germon, Moody G. Stanwood, Gilbert Pelham (or Pell; the younger brother of Dick Pelham, with whom he had previously performed), George Alfred Harrington, and George Warren White. Pelham played bones and was the lead clown; Harrington (bass) and White (baritone) sang and played banjo, a newly introduced instrument at the time; Stanwood (tenor) played accordion; and Germon (alto) played tambourine and sang comic ballads. Their songs included "Buffalo Gals", "Lucy Neal", and "Old Dan Tucker".

For most of 1846, they performed regularly at the St James's Theatre in London. They played in taverns and theatres, as well as private concerts for the aristocracy; they appeared before the Duke of Devonshire, and by special command played before Queen Victoria and the Duke of Wellington at Arundel Castle. Music hall historian Harold Scott wrote of them: "They charmed principally by their gentility, and this impression was heightened by the fact that they appeared in conventional tail coats and white waistcoats." The Era reported that "their songs are of a melodious and artistic nature. Several of the company possess quite good voices, and the comedians manage to get the utmost fun out of their business, without resorting to vulgarity in any form". In England, they were frequently mistaken for real black men, a misconception they always denied, asserting that they had not the "least drop of black blood in their veins"; accordingly, "they lost no time in published portraits of themselves with the white faces bestowed upon them by nature."

The troupe's performances represented "the high point of minstrelsy's success in early Victorian Britain". However, in their absence abroad, rivals such as the Christy Minstrels gained a following in the United States. Upon their return from England in 1847, the Spirit of the Times wrote that the Serenaders' formal style in music and dress was too refined for audiences accustomed to the ribald humor of the Christys. Of a Serenaders' performance, the article said, ". . . we listen and are pleased but leave with little desire to return." At Christys, "we listen and laugh and desire to go again and again."

== Second British tour ==
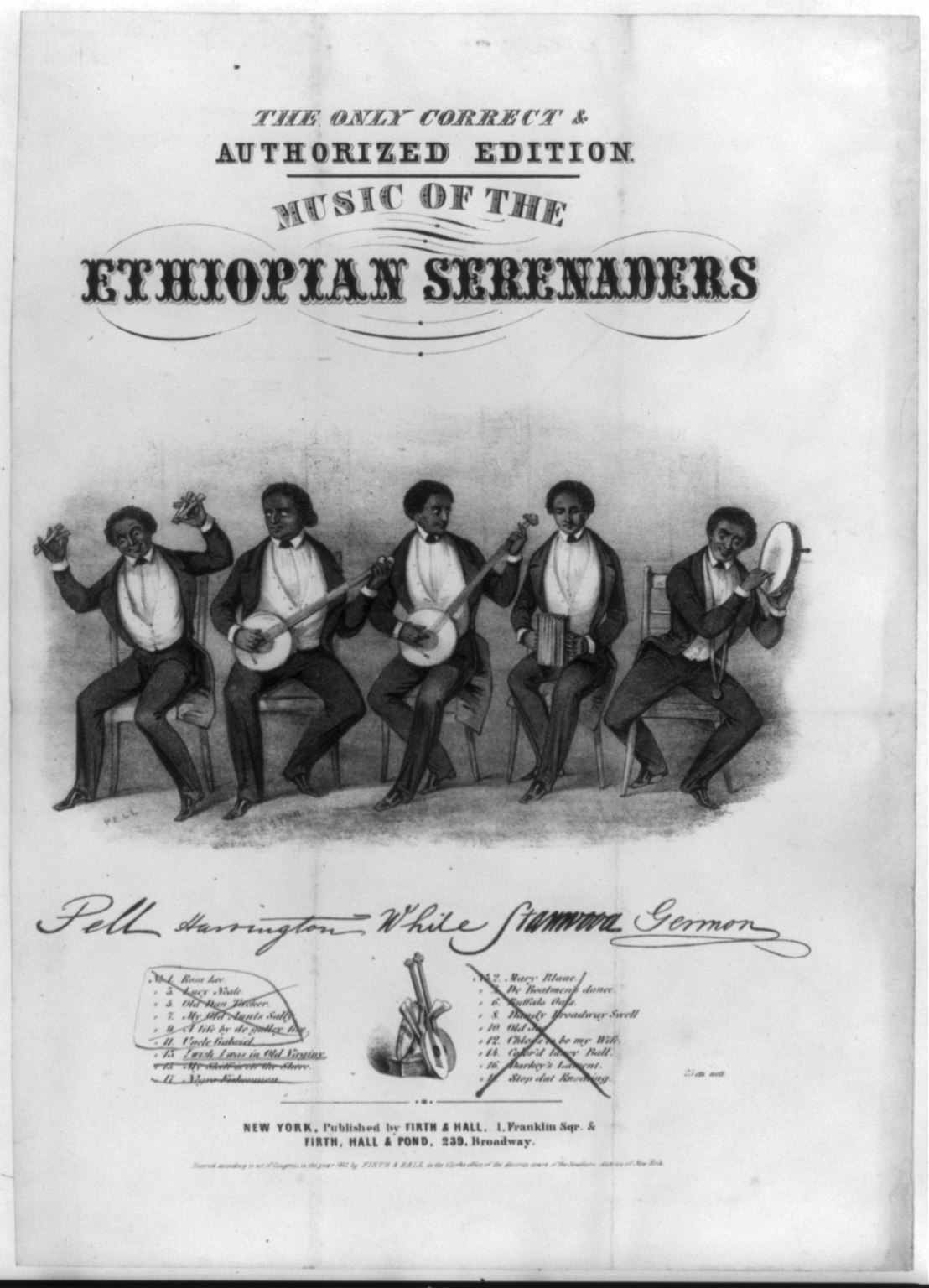

Dumbolton formed a new, expanded, troupe of Serenaders, again fronted by Pelham. With the addition of William Henry Lane, a black man known as "Master Juba", they returned to London in June 1848, when they performed at Vauxhall Gardens and toured in England and Scotland. The other performers were Thomas F. Briggs, J. H. Everton, James H. Irwin, M. C. Ludlow, and J.W. Valintine. They returned to the United States in 1849.

== Return to the U.S. ==
Dumbolton established a new group of minstrels in the United States, again including Pelham, together with Cool White (John Hodges), and Emmett (first name unknown, but possibly Dan Emmett). When they performed in Oswego, New York, the Dumbolton Company was described as "second only in popularity to the famous Christy Minstrels".

== Later activities ==
Of the early troupe members, Germon, Harrington and Stanwood died at a relatively young age, as did Tony Winnemore. Gilbert Pelham (c.1820–1872) eventually returned to England, married, and died in Rainhill Hospital near Liverpool, probably from syphilis. George Warren White (1816–1886) performed with various minstrel troupes in the U.S., including Bryant's Minstrels until at least 1868, as well as in opera companies; he also composed melodies. He died in Somerville, Massachusetts.
