= Juber =

Juber is a surname. Notable people with the name include:

- Ilsey Juber (born 1986), American singer and songwriter
- Laurence Juber (born 1952), English musician
- Master Juber, stage name of Lewis Davis
