= Marian Hannah Winter =

American historian (1910–1981)

- Marian Hannah Winter, from a 1939 newspaper
- Born: March 20, 1910; New York City
- Died: December 15, 1981 (aged 71); Paris, France
- Occupation: Dance historian

Marian Hannah Winter (March 20, 1910 – December 15, 1981) was an American musicologist and dance historian. She has been called one of "the [two] foremost names in American dance history."

== Early life and education ==
Winter was born in New York City, the daughter of Ernest Winter and Rose Rosenbluth Winter. Her father and maternal grandparents were all immigrants from central Europe; her mother was a policewoman who collected theatrical sketches.

She attended Radcliffe College.

== Career ==
In 1939, Winter worked for the Federal Music Project in New York City, and assembled an exhibit on "Art Scores for Music" at the Brooklyn Museum, called "the first international exhibition of scores for cabaret and concert hall music".

In the 1940s, dance historian Lincoln Kirstein solicited Winter to write for Dance Index, a magazine he headed. In contrast to Kirstein's analytical or polemical approach to history, Winter was more of an archivist. One of Winter's most influential works is "Juba and American Minstrelsy", published in 1947. The article sketches the life of Master Juba, a black American dancer active in the mid-19th century. Winter argues that Juba introduced African elements to American dance forms and, in the process, created a new, distinctly American style. The article attempts to "[re-appropriate] for black culture what is otherwise generally seen as racist theft."

Winter moved to France in her later years, where she worked as a translator and collected art and ephemera related to fairs and festivals. There, she published The Theater of the Marvels in both English- and French-language editions. She was awarded a Guggenheim Fellowship in 1974. Of her 1974 book, The Pre-Romantic Ballet, one reviewer said that "Some historians have an ability to write about the remote past as if they were giving a first-hand account of personal experience. Marian Hannah Winter is one of them."

== Publications ==
- "American Theatrical Dancing from 1750 to 1800" (1938)
- Art Scores for Music (1939)
- "The Function of Music in Sound Film" (1941)
- "Augusta Maywood" (1943)
- "Juba and American Minstrelsy" (1947)
- The Theater of the Marvels (1964, with a preface by Marcel Marceau)
- The Pre-Romantic ballet (1974)

== Personal life and legacy ==
Winter used a wheelchair in her later years, to manage the effects of a progressive neurological condition. She died in Paris. A collection of her papers, including correspondence, notebooks, and photographs, is held at the Houghton Library, Harvard University.

The Marian Hannah Winter Professorship in Theatre and Dance Studies at the University of Wisconsin-Madison was named in her memory. In 1985, items from her collection of fairground memorabilia were displayed at the Pusey Library, Harvard, in Cambridge.
