= Lillian Moore =

Dancer, teacher, and dance historian (1911-1967)

- Born: Lillian Moore; September 20, 1911; Chase City, Virginia
- Died: July 28, 1967 (aged 55–56); New York City

Lillian Moore (1911–1967) was a dancer, teacher, and dance historian.

== Biography ==
Moore was born on September 20, 1911, in Chase City, Virginia. She studied at the Peabody Conservatory, the Metropolitan Opera Ballet School, and the School of American Ballet

Her dance career spanned decades and included dancing the Metropolitan Opera as a member of the corps de ballet and as a soloist from 1928 through 1942. She danced with the American Ballet from 1935 through 1938. She was a dancer, choreographer, and ballet master for the Cincinnati Summer Opera from 1940 through 1946. She toured Europe and the Pacific, with sources conflicting about the years (either during World War II in Europe, or after World War II in both Europe and the Pacific,).

In the 1950s Moore danced for the Jacob's Pillow performance space in the Berkshires. In the 1950s and 1960s she taught dance at the High School of Performing Arts and the Joffrey.

Moore's writing and research took a prominent place in her life. She served for a time as acting curator of the New York Public Library's (NYPL) dance collection. Much of her research on 18th and 19th century dance is in the collection of the Jerome Robbins Dance Division of the New York Public Library for the Performing Arts. Moore's writing includes articles for dance journals such as Dance Index and Dance Perspectives. Her book Artists of the Dance was published by Thomas Y. Crowell Co. in 1938. An anthology of her essays Echoes of American ballet was published posthumously in 1976 by Dance Horizons.

Moore died on July 28, 1967, in New York City.
