= Master Juba =

Pioneering black tapdancer (1825–1854)

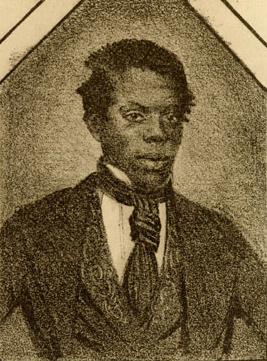
- Portrait of Boz's Juba from an 1848 London playbill
- Born: William Henry Lane c. 1825
- Died: c. 1854
- Other name: Boz's Juba
- Occupation: Dancer

Master Juba (c. 1825 – c. 1854) was an African-American dancer active in the 1840s. He was one of the first black performers in the United States to play onstage for white audiences and the only one of the era to tour with a white minstrel group. His real name was believed to be William Henry Lane, and he was also known as "Boz's Juba" following Charles Dickens's graphic description of him in his 1842 travelogue American Notes. By affecting blackface performance, Juba was highly influential in the development of such American dance styles as tap, jazz, and step dancing.

As a teenager, he began his career in the rough saloons and dance halls of New York's Five Points neighborhood, moving on to minstrel shows in the mid-1840s. "Master Juba" frequently challenged and defeated the best white dancers, including the period favorite, John Diamond. At the height of his American career, Juba's act featured a sequence in which he imitated a series of famous dancers of the day and closed by performing in his style. Being a black man, he appeared with minstrel troupes in which he imitated white minstrel dancers caricaturing black dance, obscuring his underlying ethnic identity with blackface. Even with his success in America, his greatest success came in England.

In 1848 "Boz's Juba" traveled to London with the Ethiopian Serenaders, an otherwise white minstrel troupe. Boz's Juba became a sensation in Britain for his dance style. He was a critical favorite and the most written-about performer of the 1848 season. Nevertheless, an element of exploitation followed him through the British Isles, with writers treating him as an exhibit on display. Records place Juba in both Britain and America in the early 1850s. His American critics were less kind, and Juba faded from the limelight. He died some time after 1851, most likely in 1854, likely from overwork and malnutrition. He was largely forgotten by historians until a 1947 article by Marian Hannah Winter resurrected his story.

Existing documents offer confused accounts of Juba's dancing style, but certain themes emerge: it was percussive, expressive, varied in tempo, and at times lightning-fast. The dance likely incorporated both European folk steps, such as the Irish jig, and African-derived steps used by plantation slaves, such as the walkaround. Before Juba's career, the dance of blackface performance was more faithful to black culture than its other aspects, but as blackfaced clowns and minstrels adopted elements of his style, Juba further enhanced this authenticity.

== Early life and career ==
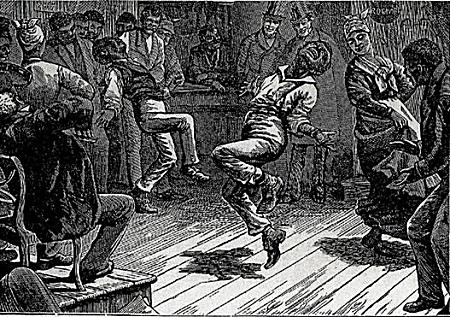
In 1842, Charles Dickens watched a spirited dancer in New York City and wrote about him in his American Notes, published the same year. This engraving was an illustration from that book. Later writers identified the youth as Juba.

Little is known about Juba's life. Scant details appear in primary sources, and secondary sources—most dating to years after his death—are of dubious validity. Dance historian Marian Hannah Winter proposed that Juba was born to free parents in 1825 or later. Showman Michael B. Leavitt wrote in 1912 that Juba came from Providence, Rhode Island, and theater historian T. Allston Brown gives his real name as William Henry Lane. According to an item in the August 11, 1895, edition of the New York Herald, Juba lived in New York's Five Points District. This was a slum where Irish immigrants and free black people lived amidst brothels, dance houses, and saloons where black people regularly danced. The Irish and black populations intermingled and borrowed elements of folk culture from each other. One area of exchange was dance, and the Irish jig blended with black folk steps. In this environment, Juba learned to dance from his peers, including "Uncle" Jim Lowe, a black jig and reel dancer who performed in low-brow establishments. Juba was dancing for food and tossed coins by the early 1840s. Winter speculated that by about age 15, Juba had no family.

Primary sources show that Juba performed in dance competitions, minstrel shows, and variety theaters in the Northeastern United States beginning in the mid-1840s. The stage name Juba probably derives from the juba dance, itself named for the central or west African term giouba. "Jube" and "Juba" were common names for slaves in this period, especially those rumored to have dancing or musical talent. Documentation is confusing, as at least two black dancers were using the name Juba at this time. For example, in 1840 a man named Lewis Davis was using the name "Master Juber" and making his living "travelling through the states, dancing negro extravaganzas, breakdowns, &c". He was arrested for theft in New York City.

An anonymous letter from 1841 or early 1842 in the tabloid newspaper the Sunday Flash states that Juba was working for showman P. T. Barnum. The writer stated that Barnum had managed the dancer since 1840 when he had disguised the boy as a white minstrel performer—by making him up in blackface—and put him on at the New York Vauxhall Gardens. In 1841, the letter alleges, Barnum went so far as to present his charge as the Irish-American performer John Diamond, the most celebrated dancer of the day. The letter further accuses Barnum of entering Juba-as-Diamond in rigged dance competitions against other performers:

The boy is fifteen or sixteen years of age; his name is "Juba;" and to do him justice, he is a very fair dancer. He is of harmless and inoffensive disposition and is not, I sincerely believe, aware of the meanness and audacity of the swindler to which he is presently a party. As to the wagers which the bills daily blazon forth, they are like the rest of his business—all a cheat. Not one dollar is ever bet or staked, and the pretended judges who aid in the farce, are mere blowers.

Writer Thomas Low Nichols supported parts of the story in an 1864 book of social history. He states that in 1841 Diamond quit his work as a dancer in the employ of Barnum and was replaced by "a genuine negro", whom Barnum billed as "the champion nigger-dancer of the world". The black dancer would have debuted in the spring of 1841. Nichols never identified the dancer as Juba, but later writers concluded that the boy was that performer. Historian Eric Lott has identified the irony of this arrangement: a black man imitating a white man imitating a black man.

Beginning in the early 1840s, Juba began a series of dance competitions known as challenge dances. He faced white rival John Diamond, who advertised that he "delineate[d] the Ethiopian character superior to any other white person". Sources disagree about the date of their first contest; it may have occurred while Diamond was still working for Barnum or a year or two later. This advertisement from the July 8, 1844, New York Herald is typical of the publicity the matches generated:

GREAT PUBLIC CONTEST

Between the two most renowned dancers in the world, the Original JOHN DIAMOND and the colored boy JUBA, for a Wager of $200, on MONDAY EVENING July 8 at the BOWERY AMPHITHEATRE, which building has been expressly hired from the Proprietor, Mr. Smith, for this night only, as its accommodations will afford all a fair view of each step of these wonderful Dancers. The fame of these two Celebrated Breakdown Dancers has already spread over the Union, and the numerous friends of each claim the Championship for their favorite, and who have anxiously wished for a Public Trial between them and thus known which is to bear the Title of the Champion Dancer of the World. The time to decide that has come, as the friends of Juba have challenged the world to produce his superior in the art for $100. That Challenge has been accepted by the friends of Diamond, and on Monday Evening they meet and Dance three Jigs, Two Reels, and the Camptown Hornpipe. Five Judges have been selected for their ability and knowledge of the Art so that a fair decision will be made.

Rule—Each Dancer will select his Violin and the victory will be decided by the best time and the greatest number of steps.

Historian James W. Cook has suggested that Juba and Diamond may have staged their first competition as a form of mutual publicity. Claims of black superiority over an acclaimed white rival were otherwise unheard of in the climate of racial segregation and white supremacy that permeated New York City and the country at large in the mid-1840s.

Challenge dances usually employ three judges. One sat on the stage and counted time, another sat in or near the orchestra pit and judged style, and the third went under the stage and observed the dancer's execution to listen for "missing taps, defective rolls, and heel work, the lagging in the breaks". After the dance, they compared notes and chose the winner. Audience members and friends of the competitors bet on the outcome and could name the victor by popular acclaim in the case the judges could not come to a decision. According to an undated reference by Leavitt, Juba lost one challenge, at the Boylston Gardens in Boston, but records show that he beat Diamond in all other competitions. An undated clipping from the Harvard Theatre Collection, written by a fan of minstrelsy, describes the single dance competition that Diamond managed to win: "One of the fiddlers played a reel for him [Juba], and he shuffled, and twisted, and walked around, and danced on for one hour and fifteen minutes by the watch." Then Juba made a loud strike with his left foot as the crowd cheered and he got a drink from the bar. Diamond was next and tried to act cool but resolute. He knew that he would displease Barnum by losing and he had his race at stake: "There was another thing about this match-dance that made Diamond want to win. You see it was not only a case of Barnum's Museum against Pete Williams's dance-house, but it was a case of white against black. So Jack Diamond went at his dancin' with double energy—first, for his place, next, for his color." He beat Juba's time and "gave a hop, skip and a jump, a yell and a bow". A black man shouted out, "He's a white man, sure ... but he's got a nigger in his heel." The two had their most famous matchup in New York City in 1844, where Juba beat Diamond for $500. Juba then traveled to Boston, billing himself as the "King of All the Dancers", and played for two weeks, with competitions versus Frank Diamond (no relation to John).

In 1842, English writer Charles Dickens toured New York's Five Points. This was around the time of the challenge dances, and Dickens was possibly drawn by rumors of Barnum's disguising of a black youth as a white minstrel performer. There the writer witnessed a performance by "a lively young negro" at the Almack's tavern and brothel at 67 Orange Street in the infamous Mulberry Bend. The November 11, 1842, edition of the New York Herald later identified this dancer as Juba. Dickens wrote in his American Notes,

The corpulent black fiddler, and his friend who plays the tambourine, stamp upon the boarding of the small raised orchestra in which they sit, and play a lively measure. Five or six couples come upon the floor, marshaled by a lively young negro, who is the wit of the assembly, and the greatest dancer known. He never leaves off making queer faces, and is the delight of all the rest, who grin from ear to ear incessantly ...

... But the dance commences. Every gentleman sets as long as he likes to the opposite lady, and the opposite lady to him, and all are so long about it that the sport begins to languish when suddenly the lively hero dashes into the rescue. Instantly the fiddler grins, and goes at it tooth and nail; there is new energy in the tambourine; new laughter in the dancers; new smiles in the landlady; new confidence in the landlord; new brightness in the very candles.

Single shuffle, double shuffle, cut, and cross-cut; snapping his fingers, rolling his eyes, turning in his knees, presenting the backs of his legs in front, spinning about on his toes and heels like nothing but the man's fingers on the tambourine; dancing with two left legs, two right legs, two wooden legs, two wire legs, two spring legs—all sorts of legs and no legs—what is this to him? And in what walk of life, or dance of life, does man ever get such stimulating applause as thunders about him, when, having danced his partner off her feet, and himself too, he finishes by leaping gloriously on the bar counter, and calling for something to drink, with the chuckle of a million of counterfeit Jim Crows, in one inimitable sound!

Juba may have capitalized on the free publicity given him by Dickens as he made the jump from the saloon to the stage. An undated excerpt from the New York Herald describes Juba's appearance with a minstrel troupe at Pete Williams' dance hall on Orange Street:

[T]hose who passed through the long hallway and entered the dance hall, after paying their shilling to the darky doorkeeper, whose "box-office" was a plain soap box, or a wooden one of that description, saw this phenomenon, "Juba," imitate all the dancers of the day and their special steps. Then Bob Ellingham, the interlocutor and master of ceremonies, would say, "Now, Master Juba, show your own jig." Whereupon he would go through all his steps and specialties, with never a resemblance in any of them to those he had just imitated.

In this performance, Juba imitated the white minstrel performers Richard Pelham, Frank Brower, John Daniels, John Smith, James Sanford, Frank Diamond, and John Diamond. The idea that Juba could "imitate himself" after mimicking his rivals points up, according to Lott, "minstrelsy's fundamental consequence for black culture, the dispossession and control by whites of black forms that would not for a long time be recovered". Nevertheless, Juba's imitations of his white rivals asserted his greater mastery of the styles then current in Blackface dance. They also asserted that this was an artistic medium worthy of imitation. James W. Cook writes, "in a sense, the Imitation Dance served as a powerful act of defiance from someone who, more typically, would have lacked any means of broader representational control".

Dancers came to recognize Juba as the best, and his fame soared. By 1845, he was so well known that he no longer had to impersonate a white minstrel on stage. He toured through New England with the Georgia Champion Minstrels in 1844. The bill called him "The Wonder of the World Juba, Acknowledged to be the Greatest Dancer in the World. Having danced with John Diamond at the Chatham Theatre for $500, and at the Bowery Theatre for the same amount, and established himself as the King of All Dancers. No conception can be formed of the variety of beautiful and intricate steps exhibited by him with ease. You must see to believe."

In 1845, Juba began touring with the Ethiopian Minstrels. The troupe gave him top billing over its four white members, unprecedented for a black performer. From 1846, Juba toured with White's Serenaders, under the tutelage of Charles "Charlie" White, as a dancer and tambourine player off and on until at least 1850. He played a character named Ikey Vanjacklen, "the barber's boy" in a piece called "Going for the Cup, or, Old Mrs. Williams's Dance", one of the earliest known minstrel sketches. It focused on Juba's dancing in a milieu of competition and showing off. The plot follows two characters trying to fix a dance contest by soaping the floor in a way that will make all of the competitors fall except Ikey. They bet on Vanjacklen, but in the end, the judge steals the money.

== England tour, 1848 ==
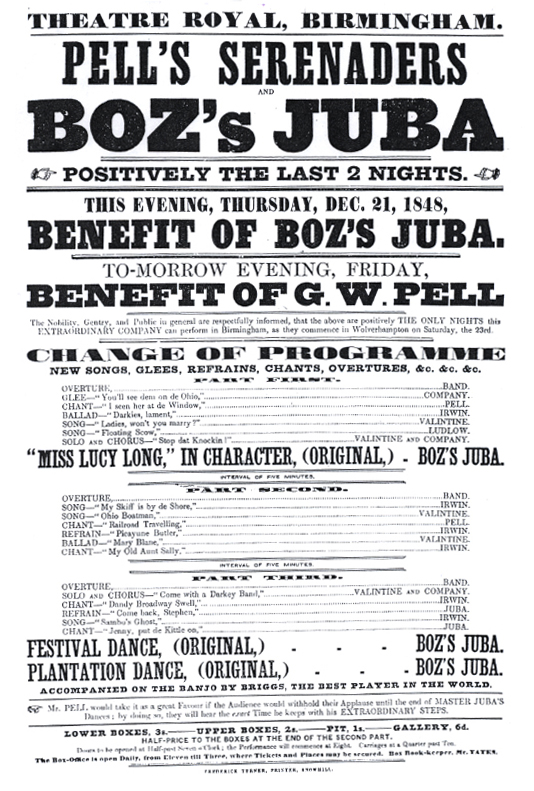
Playbill for Pell's Serenaders, with whom Boz's Juba was playing in 1848

In 1848, a dancer billed as "Boz's Juba" performed in London, England. He was a member of the Ethiopian Serenaders, a blackface minstrel troupe under the leadership of Gilbert W. Pell (or Pelham). The company had performed in England two years prior, when they had made minstrelsy palatable to middle-class British audiences by adopting refinements such as formal wear. With Boz's Juba as its newest member, the company toured middle-class theaters and lecture halls in the British Isles for the next 18 months.

The identity of Boz's Juba is open to doubt. "Boz" was a pen name used by Dickens. The Ethiopian Serenaders quoted from Dickens's American Notes in their press releases, and The Illustrated London News considered the black dancer to be the same person Dickens had seen in New York in 1842. Dickens never refuted the claims. Nevertheless, the Serenaders' assertions were promotional, and Dickens may not have remembered the exact look or characteristics of the dancer he had seen in the Five Points. Writers from the period and later have generally identified Boz's Juba as the same person Dickens had seen during his visit to New York and who had danced against Diamond.

Boz's Juba seems to have been a full member of Pell's troupe. He wore blackface makeup and played the endman, Mr. Tambo (a tambourine player) opposite Pell's Mr. Bones (on the bone castanets). He sang standard minstrel songs, such as "Juliana Johnson" and "Come Back, Steben", and he performed in sketches and "conundrum" contests. Despite this apparent level of integration into the act, advertisements for the troupe set Juba's name apart from the other members. The Serenaders continued through Britain and played establishments such as the Vauxhall Gardens. The tour ended in 1850. Its run of 18 months was the longest uninterrupted minstrel tour in Britain at that time. Juba and Pell then joined the troupe headed by Pell's brother, Richard Pelham. The company was renamed G. W. Pell's Serenaders.

Juba was the most written about performer in London for the summer 1848 season, no easy feat considering the large number of competitors. He proved a critical favorite, with commentators doting on him praise normally accorded to popular ballet dancers. That August, the Theatrical Times wrote, "The performances of this young man are far above the common performances of the mountebanks who give imitations of American and Negro character; there is an ideality in what he does that makes his efforts at once grotesque and poetical, without losing sight of the reality of representation." An anonymous clipping from the 1848 season says,

[T]he dancing of Juba exceeded anything ever witnessed in Europe ... The American Juba has for some years drawn immense audiences whenever he has appeared. He is quite young, being only in his seventeenth year. Mr. Dickens, in his 'American Notes,' gives a graphic description of this extraordinary youth, who, we doubt not, before many weeks have elapsed, will have the honor of displaying his dancing attainments in Buckingham Palace.

One reviewer wrote, "Juba is a musician, as well as a dancer. To him, the intricate management of the nigger tambourine is confined, and from it he produces marvelous harmonies [sic]. We almost question whether, upon a great emergency, he could not play a fugue upon it". His only known negative review during his British tour came from The Puppet-Show on August 12, 1848:

The principal feature in entertainments at Vauxhall is Juba: as such at least he is put forth—or rather put first—by the proprietors. Out of compliment to Dickens, this extraordinary nigger is called 'Boz's Juba,' in consequence, we believe, of the popular writer having said a good word for him in his American Notes: on this principle we could not mention the Industrious Fleas as being clever without having those talented little animals puffed all over London as being under the overwhelming patronage of the Showman. Juba's talent consists in walking round the stage with an air of satisfaction and with his toes turned in; in jumping backwards in a less graceful manner than we should have conceived possible; and in shaking his thighs like a man afflicted with palsy. He makes a terrible clatter with his feet, not owing so much to activity on his part as to stupidity on the part of his boot-maker, who has furnished him with a pair of clumsy Wellingtons sufficiently large for the feet and legs of all the Ethiopians in London: besides this, he sometimes moves about the stage on his knees, as if he was praying to be endowed with intelligence, and had unlimited credit with his tailor. As a last resource, he falls back on the floor.

The piece goes on to describe a drunken man the critic met after Juba's performance:

When again we saw him he was labouring (like a horse—or, rather, an ass) under the influence of champagne. We understood that he was imitating Juba, and he behaved so ridiculously that he may actually be said to have surpassed him.

Master Juba's stint with Pell makes him the earliest known black performer to tour with a white minstrel troupe. Scholars disagree over why he was allowed to do so. Dance historian Marian Hannah Winter argues that Juba was simply too talented to be held back. Dance historian Stephen Johnson sees Juba's talent as less central to the matter, and emphasizes the element of exoticism and exhibition in the tour. During the same period, exhibits of Arab families, Bushmen, Kaffir Zulus, and Ojibway warriors appeared in London. A reviewer for the Manchester Guardian gave an almost anthropological description of Juba, unheard of for other performers:

But the great feature of the entertainment, and that which we imagine attracted the large and respectable audience present, was undoubtedly "Master Juba," the immortalized of Boz. This "phenomenon" (as the bills describe him) is a copper-coloured votary of Terpsichore,—the Monsieur Perrot of Negro life in the southern states; and possesses the additional attraction of being a "real nigger," and not a "sham," like his vocal associates. He is apparently about eighteen years of age; about 5 feet 3 inches in height; of slender make, yet possessing great muscular activity. His head is very small, and his countenance, when at rest, has a rather mild, sedate, and far from unpleasing expression.

Pell's advertising repeatedly alleged that Juba's dance was authentic, and the reviewers seem to have believed him. The same Manchester critic remarked that Juba's dances "illustrated the dances of his own simple people on festive occasions". The few reviews of Juba as a solo performer after his tour with Pell (and thus out of the exhibitionist mode) are more negative. Dance scholar Thomas DeFrantz has said that Master Juba's stage persona "buffered associations between the potent black body onstage and the preferred impotent everyday, male slave body". Scholar of African American studies Maurice O. Wallace adds that Juba was an example of how "those strategies of black cultural performance ... have historically coalesced to shape black masculine subjecthood in Eurocentric contexts". However, Wallace cautions that by the time Juba had reached London, he had "[transcended] the racial gaze" and was seen as a dancer first and black man second.

== Later life and death, 1850–1854 ==
Back in the United States, Juba performed a solo act in working-class music halls, concert saloons, and entr'actes in nondescript theaters in New York: he had gone from obscurity to the limelight and back again. The American critics were not as kind as their English counterparts. A reviewer for the Era wrote on August 4, 1850, that "[Juba is] jumping very fast at the Colosseum, but too fast is worse than too slow, and we advise [Juba] to be wise in time. It is easier to jump down than to jump up"; and on August 11, 1850, "Juba has jumped away—by the way of an earnest yet friendly caution, let us hope that he will not throw himself away. Be wise in time is a wholesome motto". The Huddersfield Chronicle and West Yorkshire Advertiser on November 30, 1850, wrote, "The performances of Boz's Juba have created quite a sensation in the gallery, who greeted his marvellous feats of dancing with thunders of applause and a standing encore. In all the rougher and less refined departments of his art, Juba is a perfect master."

The last known record of Juba places him at the City Tavern in Dublin, Ireland, in September 1851: "Boz's Juba appears here nightly and is well received". A performer known as Jumbo is reported as having died two weeks later in Dublin. Dance historian Marian Hannah Winter said that Juba died in 1852 in London. More than 30 years later, theater historian T. Allston Brown wrote that Juba "married too late (and a white woman besides), and died early and miserably. In a note addressed to Charley White, Juba informed him that, when next he should be seen by him [White], he would be riding in his own carriage. It has been said that in 1852 his skeleton, without the carriage, was on exhibition at the Surrey Music Hall, Sheffield, England." Mahar has given the date as 1853. He would have been in his late 20s.

During January 1854 the English newspaper Northern Daily Times carried adverts for a show at the Royal Colosseum Theatre in Paradise Street, Liverpool, featuring "the celebrated Boz's Juba, immortalized by Charles Dickens in his notes on America". In 1854 a cholera epidemic broke out in Liverpool, causing heavy mortality. On February 3, 1854 the death was registered in the city of a man named "Bois Juba" and the Oxford Dictionary of National Biography accepts "Bois Juba" as a probable clerical error for "Boz's Juba", the sobriquet by which Juba was best known in England. It points out that other biographical details given on the death certificate - that the deceased was an American-born musician, aged 30 - correspond to Juba's. "Bois Juba" was registered as having died in the fever ward of the Brownlow Hill infirmary in Liverpool, and was buried on February 6, 1854 in the free part of the cemetery of the nearby church of St Martin's. St Martin's was damaged by bombing during World War II and later demolished, and although graveyard burials were re-interred at St Mary's Church, Walton-on-the-Hill the exact location of Juba's grave is therefore unknown.

The cause of Juba's death is a matter of speculation. Winter cited his "almost superhuman schedule" and the "[burning] up his energies and health" as the culprits. Assuming all of the Jubas are the same person, the record suggests that Juba worked day and night for 11 years—from 1839 to 1850. Especially in his early days, Juba worked for food and would have been served the typical tavern meal of the time, fried eels and ale. Such a demanding schedule, coupled with poor food and little sleep, likely doomed Juba to his early death.

== Performance style ==
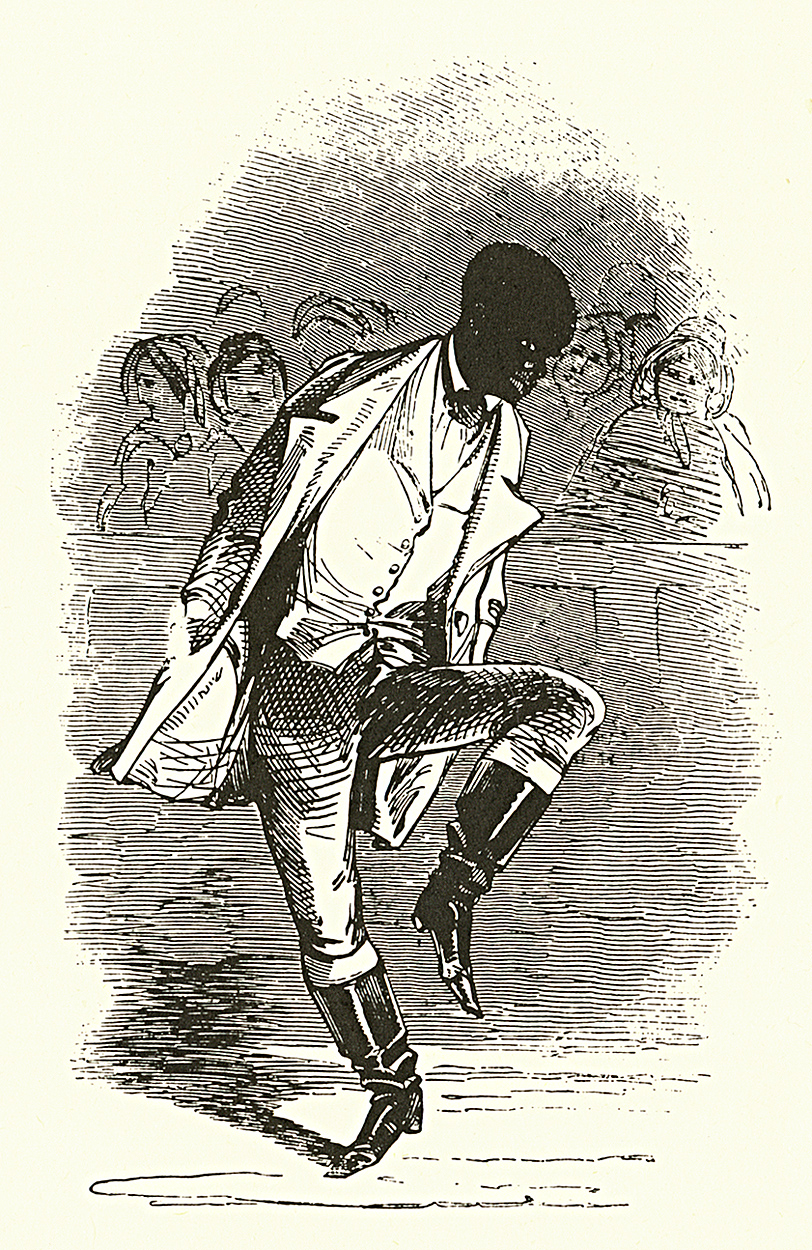
Woodcut of Juba from The Illustrated London News, August 5, 1848

Playbills tell us, broadly, what Juba did during his performances. No known description of Juba's dancing by a contemporary was written by anyone of his own race, class, or profession. While he was a remarkable dancer, it is impossible to gain precise knowledge of his style and technique, or of the degree to which he differed from his largely forgotten black contemporaries. The sources lack precise points of comparison. The more detailed accounts come from British critics, to whom Juba must have been more of a novelty than to Americans. These writers were catering to a white, middle class, British audience. Other descriptions come from promotional material and thus cannot be trusted to be objective. Juba was described as a "jig dancer" at a time when the word still connoted Irish folk dancing but was in the process of changing to encompass black dance. The Irish jig was common at this time, so skillful improvisation may account for the inordinate amount of attention Juba received.

These accounts offer only ambiguous choreographic descriptions. While these descriptions often offer exacting detail, they contradict one another. Some attempt an almost scientific precision, while others emphasize the impossibility of Juba's style. The reviews do agree that Juba's dance was novel to the point of indescribability, frenzied, varied in tempo and tone, well-timed, percussive, and expressive.

He was an integral member of the troupes with which he toured, as evidenced by the roles he played in the minstrel show presented by Pell's Ethiopian Serenaders. Juba did three dances in two forms. He performed "festival" and "plantation" dances in formal attire with Thomas F. Briggs on banjo, and dressed in drag to perform the role of Lucy Long in the song of that name, sung by Pell. There is little evidence to indicate whether Juba portrayed the wench role in sexual or burlesque style. However, a review from Manchester, England, implies that it was the former:

With a most bewitching bonnet and veil, a very pink dress, beflounced to the waist, lace-fringed trousers of the most spotless purity, and red leather boots,—the ensemble completed by the green parasol and white cambric pocket handkerchief,—Master Juba certainly looked the black demoiselle of the first ton to the greatest advantage. The playing and singing by the serenaders of a version of the well-known negro ditty, furnished the music to Juba's performance, which was after this fashion:-Promenading in a circle to the left for a few bars, till again facing the audience, he then commenced a series of steps, which altogether baffle description, from their number, oddity, and the rapidity with which they were executed ... The promenade was then repeated; then more dancing; and so on, to the end of the song.

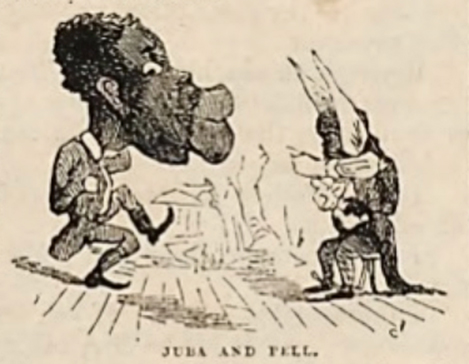
A caricature of Juba and Pell from the 1848 season shows Juba in a characteristic dance pose.

Existing images of Juba offer more hints. Two depictions, from a review of Juba at the Vauxhall Gardens, published in The Puppet-Show on August 12, 1848, show a drunken man imitating Juba's performance; he seems to be doing a cake-walk, his leg kicked high, his hat in his extended arm. A caricature of Juba shows him with knees bent and legs spread, one leg poised to land hard on the floor; arms in close. The most common image of Juba, originally from June 18, 1848, edition of The Era, shows him in a position similar to this one; his hands rest in his pockets. One British account, in an issue of The Illustrated London News from August 5, 1848, is accompanied by an illustration that shows Juba performing what seems to be a jig.

=== Indescribability ===
Writers struggled to find words to describe what they saw Juba do. A Brighton reviewer wrote that "[t]he effort baffles description. It is certainly original, and unlike anything we have ever seen before". Another wrote of "a series of steps, which altogether baffle description, from their number, oddity, and the rapidity with which they were executed". Writers struggled to compare Juba's steps to forms familiar to British audiences. Inevitably, the comparisons were to rural folk dances or to those of the exotic reaches of the British Empire:

The dances he introduced were distinguished for eccentricity, rapidity of motion, and the accuracy of the time kept. They approximated, in some respects, to those wild dances that may be witnessed sometimes in the remoter parts of the Highlands, including the sword dance, as there known; besides having the same idea of clanking the heels, as pervades the Polka. But it is not the office of the legs alone to do all this; the head, arms, and body generally take full share of duty, and assume such extraordinary positions, that only a being possessed of the power of Proteus could calculate upon taking.

Nevertheless, such comparisons cannot be taken as true indications of Juba's personal style. As a blackface minstrel, and thus parodist, Juba may have incorporated conscious parodies of such dances into his act. He also made facial expressions as he danced. Charles Dickens wrote of the young black dancer in New York that "[h]e never leaves off making queer faces".

=== Eccentricity ===
Juba seems to have presented varied styles at different tempos during a single performance. Confused reviewers struggled to explain how he moved each part of his body independently at its own speed and how he repeatedly changed his rhythm and tone. A critic for The Morning Post wrote, "Now he languishes, now burns, now love seems to sway his motions, and anon rage seems to impel his steps." A London audience member who saw Juba at the Vauxhall Gardens wondered, "How could he tie his legs into such knots, and fling them about so recklessly, or make his feet twinkle until you lose sight of them altogether in his energy." The Mirror and United Kingdom Magazine declared, "Such mobility of muscles, such flexibility of joints, such boundings, such slidings, such gyrations, such toes and such heelings, such backwardings and forwardings, such posturings, such firmness of foot, such elasticity of tendon, such mutation of movement, such vigour, such variety, such natural grace, such powers of endurance, such potency of pastern." The Manchester Examiner captured something of the rhythm of Juba's performance:

Surely he cannot be flesh and blood, but some more subtle substance, or how could he turn, and twine, and twist, and twirl, and hop, and jump, and kick, and throw his feet almost with a velocity that makes one think they are playing hide-and seek with a flash of lightning! Heels or toes, on feet or on knees, on the ground or off, it is all the same to Juba; his limbs move as if they were stuffed with electric wires.

=== Percussion ===
The percussive sounds Juba made during his performances were another element that distinguished his dance from standard Irish jigs. Contemporary reviewers often alluded to these sounds. Playbills asked audiences to remain silent during Juba's dances so they could hear the percussion of his steps. The Manchester Guardian remarked, "To us, the most interesting part of the performance was the exact time, which, even in the most complicated and difficult steps, the dancer kept to the music." An anonymous clipping from c. 1848 said, "the dancing of Juba exceeded anything ever witnessed in Europe. The style as well as the execution is unlike anything ever seen in this country. The manner in which he beats time with his feet, and the extraordinary command he possesses over them, can only be believed by those who have been present at his exhibition." A critic in Liverpool compared his steps to Pell on the bones and Briggs on the banjo. The Morning Post wrote, "He trills, he shakes, he screams, he laughs, as though by the very genius of African melody." Descriptions also show elements of the hand jive in his dance.

Juba accompanied his dances with rapid-fire laughter synchronized to the tempo of the dance. An anonymous London critic wrote,

[T]here never was such a laugh as the laugh of Juba—there is in it the concentrated laugh of fifty comic pantomimes; it has no relation to the chuckle, and, least of all to the famous horse laugh; not a bit of it—it is a laugh distinct, a laugh apart, a laugh by itself—clear, ringing, echoing, resonant, harmonious, full of rejoicing and mighty mirth, and fervent fun; you may hear it like the continuous humming sound of nature, permeating everywhere; it enters your heart and you laugh sympathetically—it creeps into your ear, and clings to it, and all the subsequent sounds seemed to be endued with the cachinatory quality ... "Well, though the laugh of Juba be wondrous, what may be said of Juba's dancing?"

=== Authenticity ===
Juba's dance certainly incorporated elements of authentic black culture, but to what extent is uncertain. Elements of Juba's style are part of the black dance aesthetic: percussion, variable time signature, use of the body as an instrument, changes in tone and pacing, extreme gestures and poses, and emphasis on solo dancing. Juba may very well have exuded Africa's cool aesthetic: composure and vitality.

Historians have ascribed the inability of British critics to describe Juba's style to his use of African-derived forms unfamiliar to the British middle class. White accounts of his performances reflect similar descriptions of slave dances from the Caribbean and the United States. Juba was heir to the traditions of free northern black people, and Johnson has pointed to evidence that he was performing "a quite specific, African-infused plantation dance". Descriptions of his dance hint that Juba performed black steps such as the walk-around, the pigeon wing, a primordial Charleston, the long-bow J, trucking, the turkey trot, the backward spring, the wailing jawbone, and tracking upon the heel. However, Johnson cautions that "I might see any number of dance steps here, if I look longingly enough."

Juba was in a white-dominated field playing for largely white audiences; he likely compromised his culture's music and dance in order to survive in show business. This was true of his comedy sketches and songs, which did not stray from standard minstrel fare. One London observer in the 1840s who witnessed slave dances on a South Carolina plantation called them "poor shufflings compared to the pedal inspirations of Juba". Juba's dance may have been an amalgamation of African and European precedents. Dickens's piece on the New York dancer, describing leg movements only, points to the Irish jig, but he also refers to Juba performing the single and double shuffle, which are black-derived steps. Historians Shane and Graham White have argued that black people of this period performed European steps in a different style from whites. Historian Robert Toll has written that Juba "had learned a European dance, blended it with African tradition, and produced a new form, an Afro-American dance that had a great impact on minstrelsy". Dance historians Marshall and Jean Stearns have agreed, saying that "in the person of William Henry Lane, the blend of British folk with American Negro dance in the United States had, by 1848, resulted in a striking new development. So foreign observers, who were in a position to view its emergence objectively, treated it as an original creation."

== Legacy and historiography ==
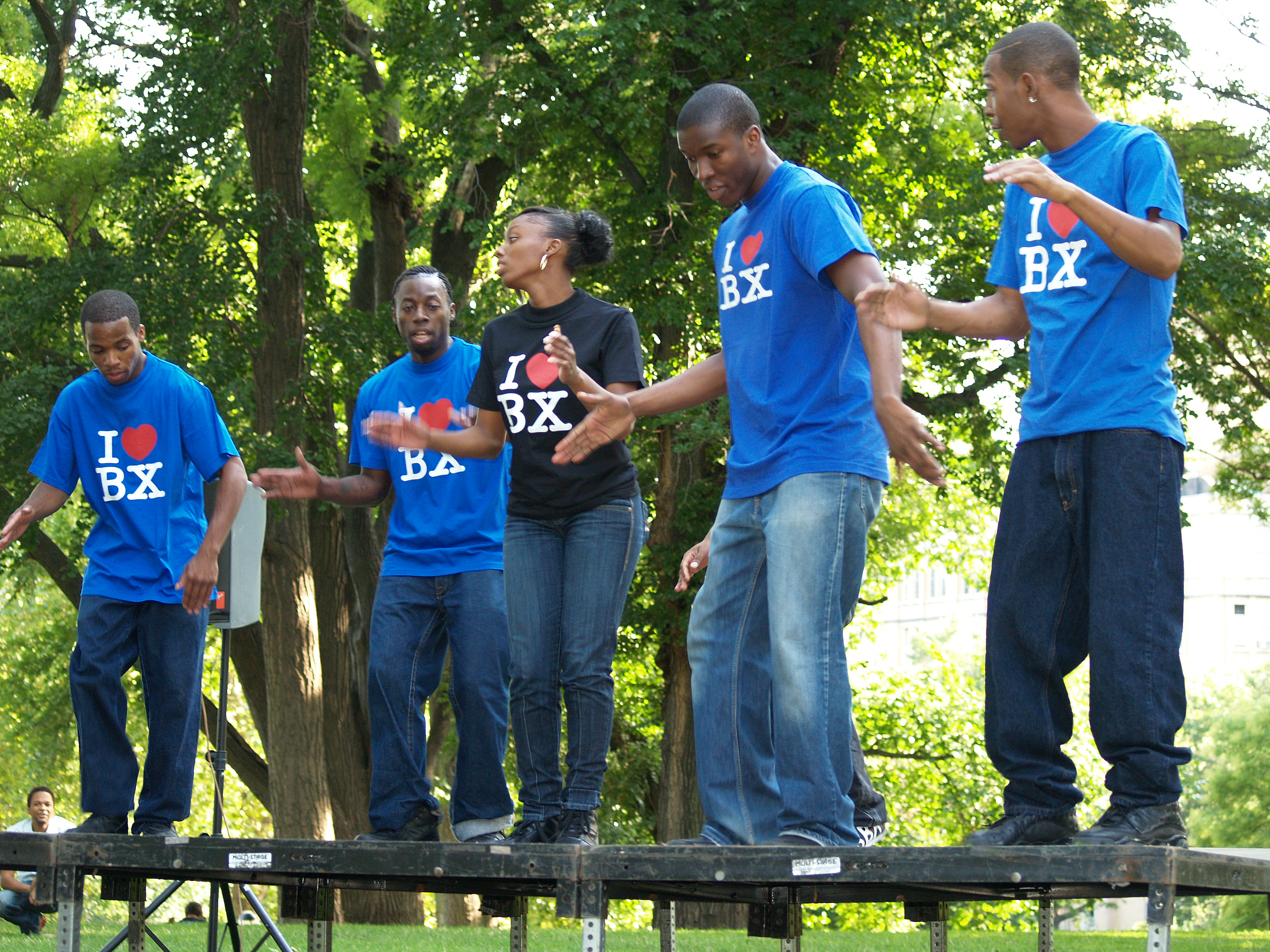
Juba likely influenced the development of modern dance forms, such as step dancing.

The terms juba dancer and juba dancing became common in variety theaters after Master Juba popularized them. Actors, minstrels, and British clowns inspired by Juba and other minstrels adopted blackface and performed dances similar to Juba's as a stage character called the "Gay Negro Boy". The character spread to France (from 1860) and Belgium (from 1865) when British circuses toured there. Elements of these dances were still found among British whiteface clowns as late as the 1940s. Juba's rave reception in Manchester may have presaged that city's later status as the center of dance in the United Kingdom. Less happily, Juba reinforced the racist caricature of the naturally musical black among white audiences.

While the name Juba passed into dance history, for many decades the man himself did not. William Henry Lane is considered to be at the forefront of blackface minstrelsy entertainment. He died in 1854 in a workhouse in Liverpool, of fever. For over 90 years after his death, Juba was largely forgotten by dancers and historians, appearing only in brief passages in sources such as histories of minstrelsy. Stephen Johnson has postulated that this indicates that either white entertainers and historians consciously downplayed Juba's significance, or that Juba was simply not that influential. Even black historians ignored Juba until the mid-20th century, preferring to focus on Juba's older and more obviously respectable contemporary Ira Aldridge, an African American actor who became a leading light of the European stage.

In 1947, dance and popular culture historian Marian Hannah Winter began the resurrection of Juba's reputation with her article "Juba and American Minstrelsy". Juba, according to Winter, surmounted the hurdles of race and class to succeed as a professional dancer. Winter was the first to write of Juba as a man who introduced elements of African dance to the Western lexicon and thus fostered the creation of a distinct American dance idiom. In so doing, Juba, according to Winter, reclaimed for African Americans elements that had been stolen in the racist culture of 19th-century America and, in the process, invented tap dancing. In short, Winter "made [Juba] significant".

When Winter wrote her article, there was little scholarship in African American studies, dance history, or minstrelsy studies. Winter based her article on, at most, six sources. Nonetheless, later writers have largely accepted and echoed her thesis. As recently as 1997, musicologist Dale Cockrell wrote that "[t]he best treatment of Juba, though it is shot through with errors, is still Winter 1948". Winter's view that Juba was the "most influential single performer of nineteenth-century American dance" is now the consensus. His career shows that black and white people actually did collaborate to an extent in blackface minstrelsy.

Scholars in recent decades have repeatedly pointed to Juba as the progenitor of tap dancing and, by extension, step dancing. Winter wrote that "[t]he repertoire of any current tap-dancer contains elements which were established theatrically by him". Dancer Mark Knowles has echoed this assertion, calling Juba "America's first real tap dancer". Music historian Eileen Southern calls him the "principal black professional minstrel of the antebellum period (and) a link between the white world and authentic black source material". Scholars point to Juba as the first African American to insert aspects of authentic black culture into American dance and theater. In so doing, Juba ensured that blackface dance was more authentically African than the other elements of the minstrel show. Wallace has gone so far as to call Juba "the pater alios of black masculine dance history, and the 'initiator and determinant of the form itself,' a form which lends visible expression to the difficult dialectics of black masculinity". Johnson, however, has cautioned against this interpretation. His reading of the primary sources sees more evidence of eccentricity in Juba's dance than of a proto-tap or -jazz.

== See also ==
- List of dancers
