= George B. Wooldridge =

American minstrel show manager

George B. Wooldridge was the business manager of the first blackface minstrel troupe, the Virginia Minstrels, in the mid-19th century. He sometimes went by the name Tom Quick.
