= Stump speech (minstrelsy) =

Comic monologue from blackface minstrelsy

The stump speech was a comic monologue from blackface minstrelsy typically consisting of malapropisms, nonsense sentences, and puns delivered in a parodied version of Black Vernacular English. The stump speaker wore blackface makeup and moved about like a clown. Topics varied from pure nonsense to parodies of politics, science, and social issues, as well as satirical commentary on political and social issues. The stump speech was a precursor to modern stand-up comedy.

== Performance ==
The stump speech was usually the highlight of the olio, the minstrel show's second act. The stump speaker, typically one of the buffoonish endmen known as Tambo and Bones, mounted some sort of platform and delivered the oration in an exaggerated parody of Black Vernacular English that hearkened to the Yankee and frontiersman stage dialects from the theatre of the period. The speech consisted of a barrage of malapropisms, non sequiturs, puns, and nonsense. The stump speaker gestured wildly, contorted his body, and usually fell off his stump at some point. Speakers often took on the persona of popular minstrel show characters, such as the black dandy Zip Coon.

In his guide to staging a minstrel show, Charles Townsend offers this advice:

Stump Speeches are always very popular, if original in thought, and well delivered. …In delivering a stump speech, let your costume be as comical as possible. If you are tall, wear a tight fitting suit, which will make you appear taller yet. On the contrary, if you are short and stout, emphasize it by wearing very loose clothing. Some stump speakers come on in a ragged suit and damaged "plug" hat, carrying an old-fashioned valise and huge umbrella. A negro stump speech, being only a burlesque, admits of any peculiarities you may choose to introduce.

== Content ==
The content of the stump speech varied widely. Some were pure nonsense, such as Richard Pelham's "A Brief Battering at the Blues". Historian Robert Toll offers this excerpt as typical of the type:

Feller-feller and oder fellers, when Joan of Ark and his broder Noah's Ark crossed de Rubicund in search of Decamoran's horn, and meeting dat solitary horseman by de way, dey anapulated in de clarion tones of de clamurous rooster, de insignificition of de — de — de — de hop-toad am a very big bird — du da — du da day — does it not prove dat where gold is up to a discount of two cups of coffee on de dollar, dat bolivers must fall back into de radience of de-de — anything else, derefore, at once and exclusively proving de fact dat de afore-mentioned accounts for de milk in de cocoa-nut!

"A Meeting of the Limkiln Club"
A blackface stump speech by the American Quartet, 1902

Other stump speeches were send-ups of science or philosophy that parodied the lyceum lectures popular with the educated middle class in the 1850s. One example was Billy Whitlock's "Locomotive Lecture", a comical look at the steam engine. Others satirized political and social issues such as abolitionism or public education. For example, Frank Brower of the Virginia Minstrels delivered a "Definition of the Bankrupt Laws".

Prior to the American Civil War, women's rights was a popular target of the stump speech's ridicule. The women's rights lecture became a standard part of the repertoire for many troupes, who joked about women being interested in "polytick" only because "de majority ob em am strongly tached to parties." Another speech claimed that

There hev bin women in the world who hev done suthin'. There wuz the Queen of Sheba, who was eggselled only by Solomon, and all that surprised her in him wuz that he could support 3,000 women. ...And there was Joan of Arc, who whipped the English, who was maid of New Orleans, which wuzn't the same as Noah's Ark, for that was made of gopher wood, besides the latter was pitched without and pitched within. There wuz Queen Elizabeth, who wuz the virgin queen; and Mrs. Swisshelm; there's Lucy Stone, and Anna Dickinson; there's Lucretia Mott, and Mrs. Jinks, all uv whom showed thet women cood seese to be women, and be ez neer to men ez nacher allowed them. Thet's what all our sex want—to be ez neer men ez possible.

During the Reconstruction period, black Congressmen became a popular subject, portrayed as bumblers whose incompetence prevented them from posing any threat to the white-dominated government. Stump speeches not only poked fun at these topics but also at the caricatured black speakers' ability to understand them. Nevertheless, the blackface makeup acted as a fool's mask, allowing minstrels to discuss topics that might otherwise be taboo. Many troupes developed stump specialists who were well known for covering specific material. For example, Eph Horn was known for his women's rights lecture.

The stump speech is one important antecedent of modern stand-up comedy. The double-talk of Professor Irwin Corey, Norm Crosby, and Al Kelly originated there. Such performances influenced print media as well, as exemplified by the dialect essays and editorials that appeared in American newspapers such as the New York Clipper in the 19th century.
