= John Baptist Snowden =

American Methodist minister who was born enslaved

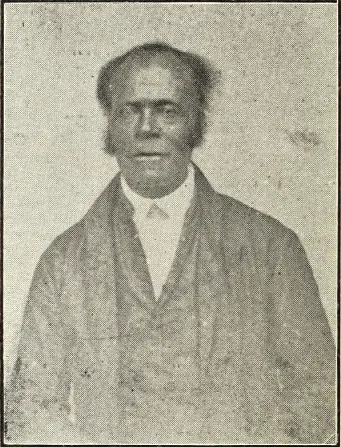
- Born: May 14, 1801; Maryland, U.S.
- Died: September 8, 1885 (aged 84); Carroll County, Maryland, U.S.
- Occupation: Methodist preacher
- Spouse: Margaret Coone (m. 1831; died 1870)
- Children: 14

John Baptist Snowden (May 14, 1801 – September 8, 1885) was an American minister. He was born enslaved, and purchased his freedom. He wrote an autobiography which was published following his death by his son.

== Biography ==
By the time Snowden was a teenager he had five different enslavers in Anne Arundel County in Maryland. He was able to buy his freedom by selling baskets and hickory brooms he made himself; peppermint drops he distilled, and other small items he was able to sell to his neighbors. During the 1820s his enslaver agreed to a price for Snowden's freedom, and then he left the vicinity.

Snowden was taught to read by his enslaver's children, as well as by a teacher whom he hired. He was forced to hide his studies from his enslavers, as they did not approve. Snowden became a Methodist preacher in 1823 while he was still enslaved to his fifth enslaver. While still enslaved, his ministry was confined to Anne Arundel County, but after he bought his freedom he was able to preach throughout Central Maryland, including: Harford, Baltimore, Carroll and Frederick counties. Rev. Snowden also walked as far as Gettysburg, Pennsylvania and Leesburg, Virginia.

After buying his freedom he moved to Westminster and in 1831 married Margaret Coone. Ms. Coone had been born enslaved and was manumitted upon the death of her enslaver at about age 7. She never learned to read, although was fluent in both German and Pennsylvania Dutch. Snowden described her as "competent at the mathematics involved in business transactions." John and Margaret spent the rest of their lives in and around Westminster, where they had their 14 children, eight of whom reached adulthood. Of these, all of them learned to read and write. Margaret died in 1870, at the age of 60.

Snowden was a member of the Baltimore and Washington Methodist Episcopal conferences during most of his life. Several of his sons also became ministers or were in responsible jobs in business. His daughters married ministers and other well-respected community members. Mrs. Mary Walker became an educator and helped to found schools following the Civil War. Snowden died in 1885 and was buried near his wife at the Ellsworth Cemetery in Carroll County, Maryland.

Scholars Howard and Judith Sacks have theorized that Daniel Decatur Emmett, the blackface minstrel usually credited with writing the minstrel song "I Wish I Was in Dixie's Land", actually adapted it from a song originally composed by his Knox County neighbors, the Snowden family.
