= Richard Pelham =

American actor

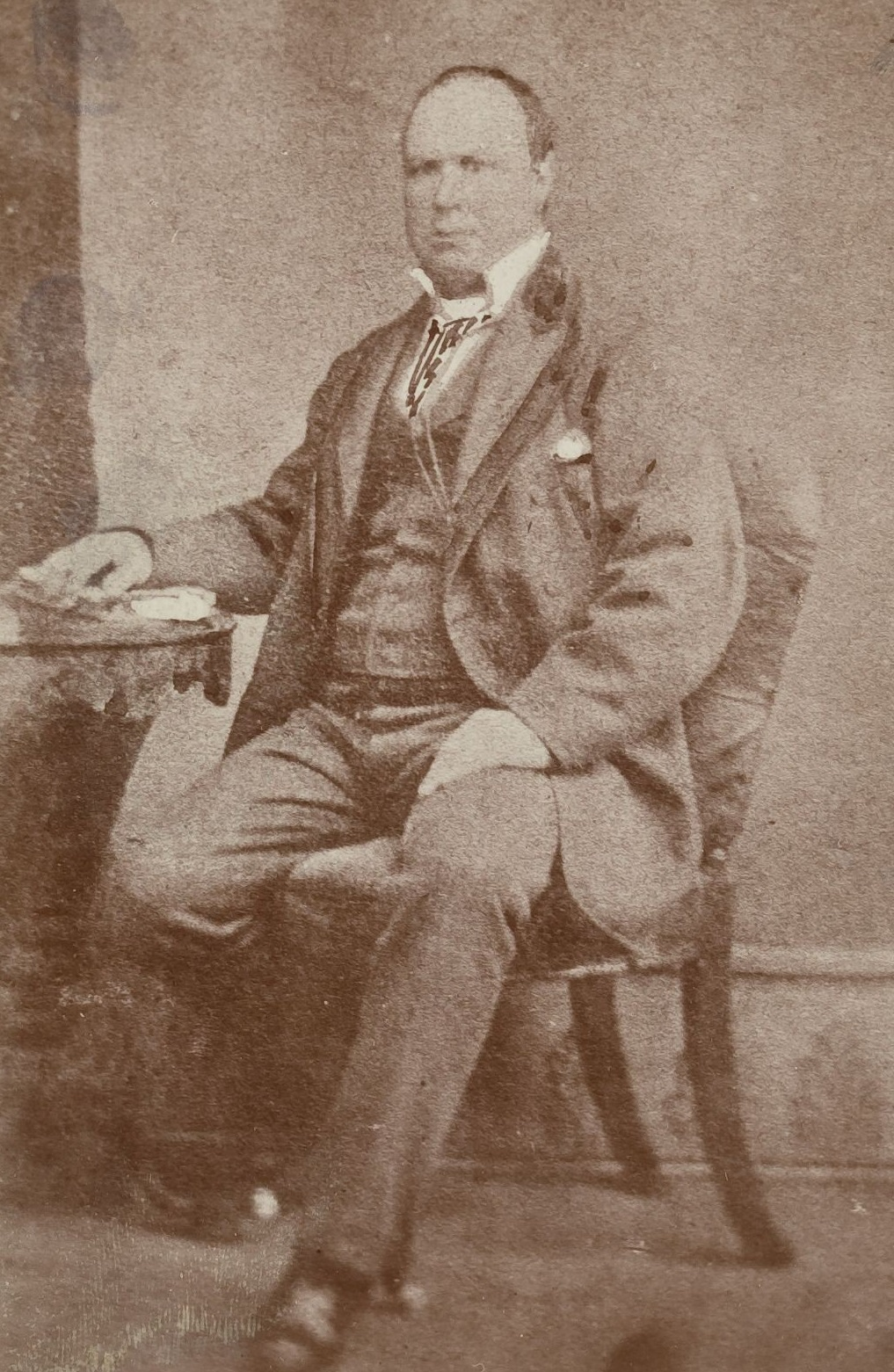
- Born: Richard Ward Pell; February 13, 1815; New York City, New York, United States
- Died: October 1876 (age 61 ≈); Liverpool, England

Richard Ward Pelham (February 13, 1815 – October 1876), born Richard Ward Pell, was an American blackface performer. He was born in New York City.

== History ==
Pelham regularly did blackface acts in the early 1840s both solo and as part of a duo or trio. His early performances were in the mould of Thomas D. Rice; he did song-and-dance versions of "Gumbo Chaff" and "Oh Pshaw!", among others. His brother, Gilbert Pelham, paired with him for part of his early career. The song "Massa Is a Stingy Man" became their trademark tune. Pelham was also a renowned dancer; by 1845, he was ranked so highly that William Henry Lane did an impression of him.

In 1843, Pelham became one of the founding members of the Virginia Minstrels, the first group to present a full minstrel show during a performance at the New York Bowery Amphitheatre on February 6, 1843. Through April 1843, he played tambourine as the Virginia Minstrels toured New York City and Boston. Pelham's style was something new for the time; in addition to traditional techniques, he played it like a drum. Pelham and Frank Brower, who played the bones, were the first minstrel endmen, and greatly influenced the stereotype. Pelham's stage demeanor involved "looks and movements comic beyond conception. He seemed animated by a savage energy; and [the handling of his instrument] . . . nearly wrung him off his seat. His white eyes rolled in a curious frenzy . . . and his hiccupping chuckles were unsurpassable." Pelham's signature non-musical bit was his "A Brief Battering at the Blues", a comic monologue and prototypical stump speech.

On April 21, 1843, when the group broke up. Pelham decided to settle in England. He briefly helped reform the Virginia Minstrels in the spring of 1844 when he met up with Brower and Joel Sweeney in Liverpool. The trio convinced Dan Emmett to rejoin, and the new ensemble played the Theatre Royal, Dublin, from April 24 to May 7 . They toured through June, then broke up again.

Over the next few decades, Pelham continued to perform, only now with British minstrel troupes. Pablo Fanque, one of Victorian England's most celebrated circus proprietors (later immortalized in The Beatles song "Being for the Benefit of Mr. Kite!"), helped popularize a Pelham sketch in England through performances at his circus in the 1860s. One of the most popular routines at Pablo's circus at Bolton in 1868 was Pelham's "Wha's Your Ticket?" in which an actor portrays "the character of a Negro engaged to collect tickets at a bal masque with express instructions to allow no one to pass without, but who by his blundering allows all to enter without that requisite." The sketch was described in 1859 as a "new afterpiece expressly imported from New Orleans by permission of R.W. Pelham Esq." The sketch was still being performed in England as a "laughable American sketch" as late as 1888.

The huge success of a recent British tour by the African-American Master Juba may have adversely affected Pelham's career there as his performance suffered in comparison. His final performance was on August 19, 1856. Richard Pelham eventually married an English actress. He died in or near Liverpool in October 1876.
