= Rufus Welch =

American circus owner (1800–1856)

Rufus Welch (September 1, 1800 – December 5, 1856) was a circus impresario in the early-19th century.

== Life and career ==
Welch was born in New Berlin, New York. He initially was a chairmaker. In 1827 he started in the zoo business. By 1829 he was running a circus with Erman Handy and they took the circus to Cuba. For much of the 1830s he was involved in running various menageries. These would often have 100 animals. Welch was a founding partner in the firm of Purdy, Welch and Macomber (PWM), the firm which ran the Boston Zoological Society, showing animals. In 1837 PWM went out of business and Welch turned to circuses because it required less capital investment. In 1837 he became the manager of the Lion Theatre Circus. In that year Welch had imported three giraffes from the African continent, which were the first of these animals brought to the USA.

Welch leased the National Theatre in Philadelphia. He called his circus the National and at the end of each touring season performed a major show in Philadelphia.

Starting in 1841 he was heavily involved with circuses in Philadelphia. From this period on he not only had animals but also acrobats and clowns in his circuses.

In 1846 Welch joined forces with Dan Rice to run a circus in Philadelphia.

Welch died in 1856 in New York City.

== Sources ==
- www.circushistory.org/Olympians/OlympiansC1.htm
- G. L. Chindahl. A History of the Circus in America. (Caldwell, Idaho: Caxton Printers, 1959) p. 37-41, 77.
