= Kentucky Minstrels =

The Kentucky Minstrels were a team formed under the leadership of Duncan Bruce to study a scheme during World War II to cover the River Thames with soot in order to conceal it from German Bombers. Work began on the Thames in a craft inappropriately named H.M.S. Persil.
