= John Hodges (minstrel) =

American blackface minstrel entertainer

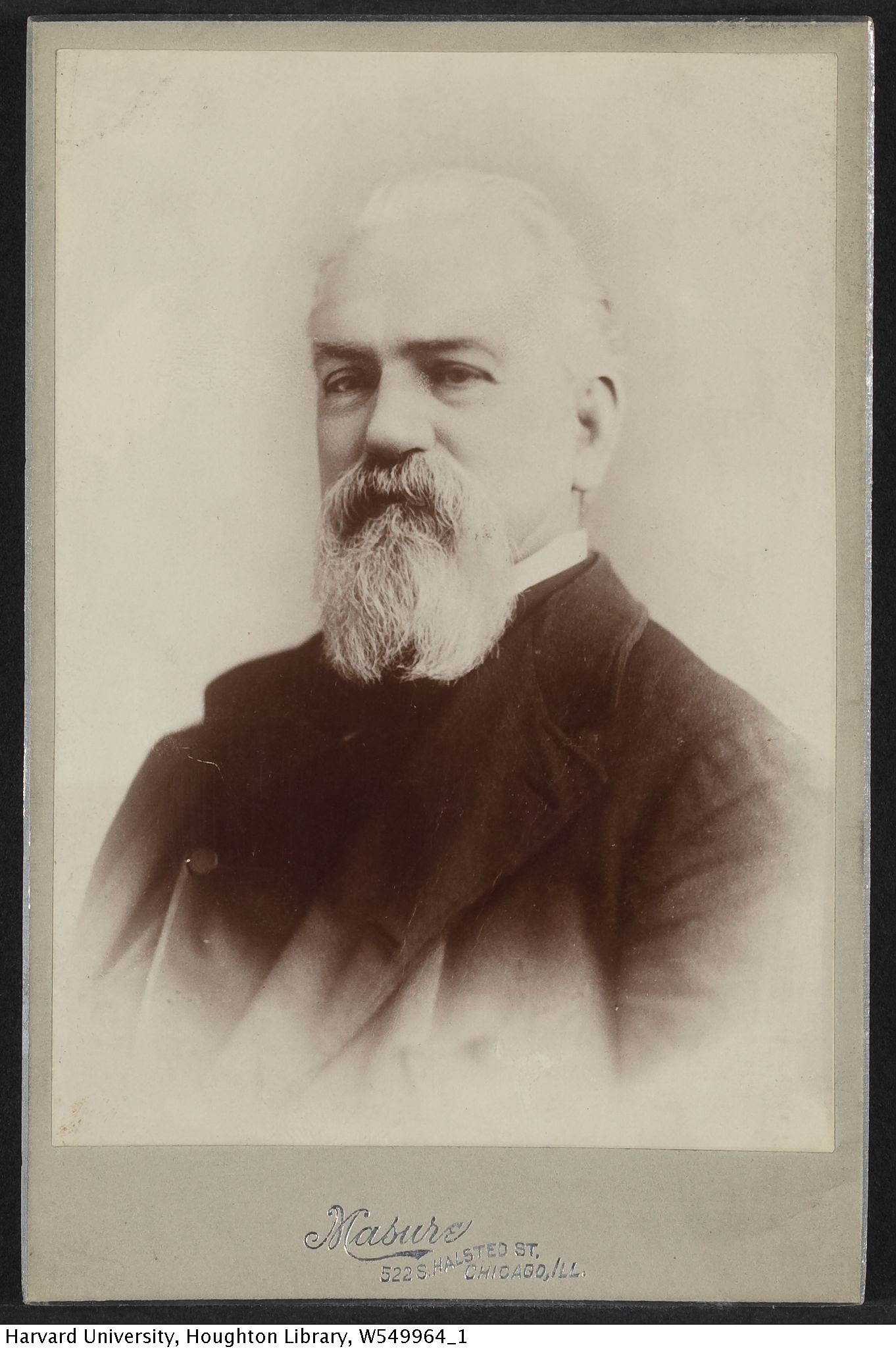
John Hodges, also known as "Cool White"

John Hodges (July 28, 1821 – April 23, 1891); known as Cool White, was an American blackface minstrel entertainer, who wrote or popularized the song "Buffalo Gals", published by him in 1844 under the title "Lubly Fan". There is some dispute as to whether he composed the tune or adapted a traditional air.

== Career ==
Hodges's stage name was "Cool White". He debuted in Pennsylvania in 1838, at the Walnut Street Theatre, Philadelphia and specialized in "dandy" roles: in 1842 he was a particular hit as a character called "Fancy Cool" in Silas S. Steele's Philadelphia Assurance. In 1843 he organized the Virginia Serenaders and later a troupe called the Sable Melodists. He later performed as a 'Shakespearian clown' with Spalding and Rogers Circus. From about 1855-59 he appeared with Sam Sanford's Minstrels in Philadelphia. In the 1860s and 1870s he appeared in New York.

In 1879 he also acted the straight role of Uncle Tom in a stage version of the famous anti-slavery melodrama.

== Retirement from the stage and death ==
By 1887 White appears to have retired from performance, becoming stage manager for Hooley's Theatre in Chicago. He was also instrumental in founding the Chicago Lodge, 3, of B. P. O. Elks.

He died in Chicago on April 23, 1891.
