= Charles White (entertainer) =

American entertainer

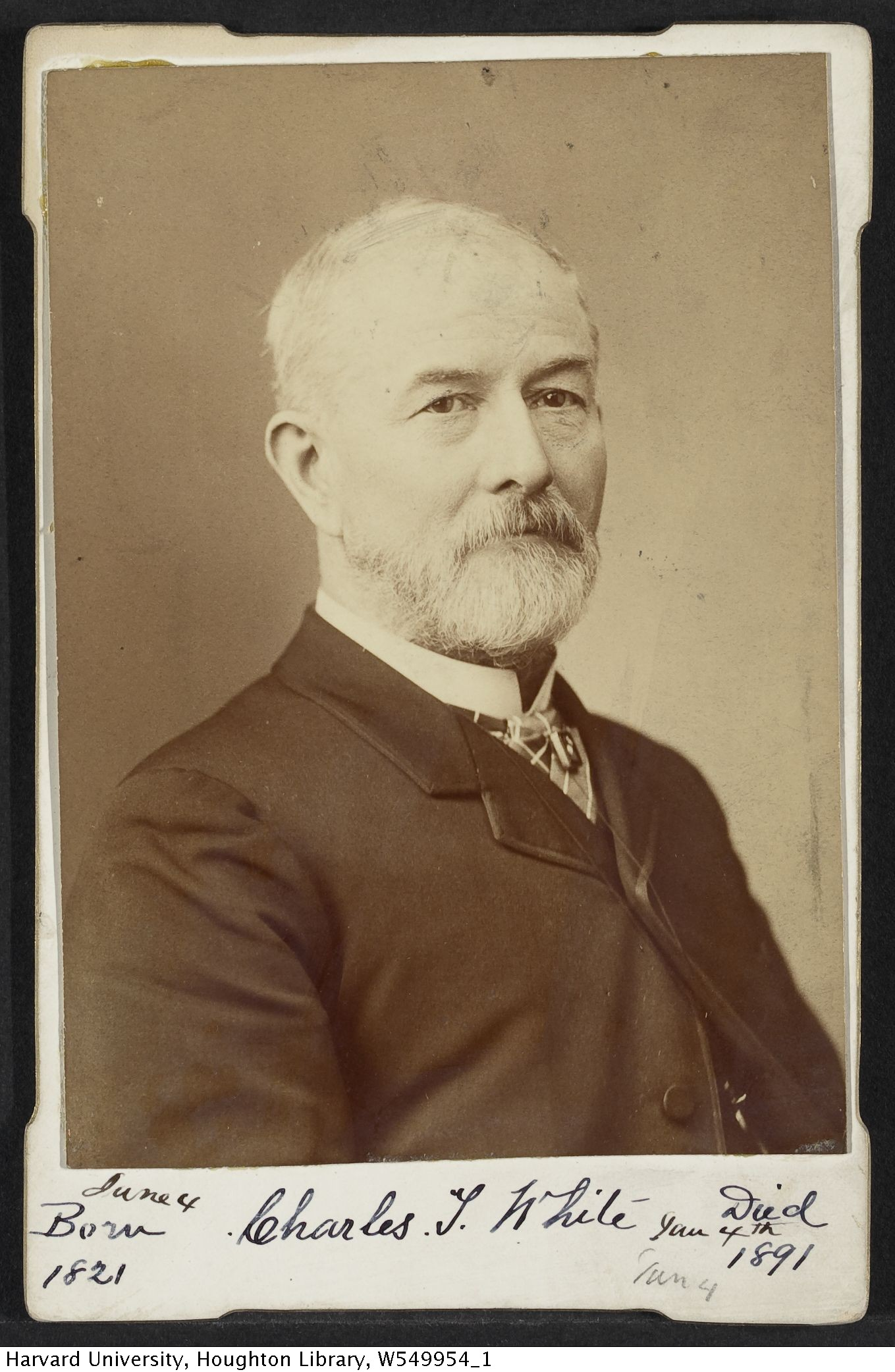
Charles White

Charles T. "Charlie" or "Charley" White (1821–1891), was an early blackface minstrel entertainer.

Born June 4, 1821 in Newark, New York, White moved with his family at the age of two to New York City, where, before he launched his career as an entertainer, he worked in racing stables, for a druggist, in a chair factory and in city government positions. He first came to public attention in 1843 as an accordion player at the Thalian Hall at 42 Grand Street. That summer, he joined the "Kentucky Minstrels" troupe at the Vauxhall Garden Theatre on Fourth Avenue.

After Daddy Rice popularized blackface with his Jim Crow character, White incorporated some "negro act" with his accordion playing and then founded White's Kitchen Minstrels in New York in the early 1840s, opening at the Melodeon on the Bowery. Whilst there he seems to have employed the famous dancer Master Juba, who apparently toured with his minstrel troupe.

In addition to the Melodeon on the Bowery, White managed other theaters. In June 1866, he opened a Music Hall for one season in Mechanic's Hall at 472 Broadway, a venue that had previously housed Bryant's Minstrels and would later host Robert Butler's American Theatre before burning down in 1868. In 1869 he ran the Theatre Comique at 514 Broadway for a season. In 1871, he took over management of Hooley's Opera House, a variety theatre in downtown Brooklyn, renaming it the Brooklyn Globe Theatre. The following year, he was running White's Athenaeum on the Bowery.

In 1877, he was the victim of an attempted mugging. Described as "Charles White, the minstrel" and as living at No. 250 Hudson Street, he was attacked while drunk by two young men who tried to make off with his watch and pocketbook, but the theft was prevented by a police officer.

He was largely retired from the stage by 1887, although his obituary in the New York Times says that he had also been engaged to play the role of an elderly black woman in the popular 1890 Broadway musical Reilly and the 400, and that since retirement he had devoted himself to writing reminiscences of his career.

He died of pleuro-pneumonia in New York at his residence, 266 West 36th Street, on January 4, 1891.
