= Buffalo Gals =

Traditional American folk song

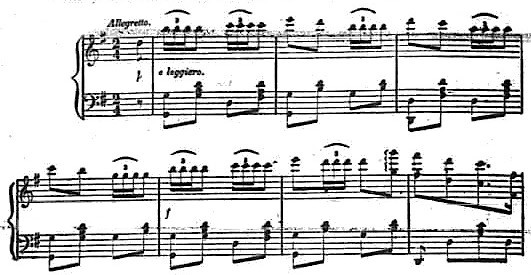
Introduction to the song (full sheet music)

"Buffalo Gals" is a traditional American song, published as "Lubly Fan" in 1844 by the blackface minstrel John Hodges, who performed as "Cool White". Whilst the song is often attributed to John Hodges it is likely to have a history that pre-dates its publication. The song was widely popular throughout the United States, where minstrels often altered the lyrics to suit local audiences, performing it as "New York Gals" in New York City, "Boston Gals" in Boston, or "Alabama Girls" in Alabama, as in the version recorded by Alan Lomax and Shirley Collins on a 1959 field recording trip. The best-known version is named after Buffalo, New York.

The chorus is:

Buffalo gals, won't you come out tonight?
Come out tonight,
Come out tonight?
Buffalo gals, won't you come out tonight,
And dance by the light of the moon?

The Western Writers of America chose it as one of the Top 100 Western Songs of all time.

== Origin ==
The lyrics are a reference to the many "dancing girls" who performed in the bars, concert-hall dives, and brothels of the Canal district of Buffalo, New York, which at that time was the western terminus of the Erie Canal and the site where canal and freighter crewmen received their wages.

== Adaptations ==
- The English singing game "Pray, Pretty Miss" may have been an inspiration for the lyric, according to Frank Brown in "Collection of North Carolina Folklore".
- A new set of lyrics to the same tune entitled "Dance with a Dolly (with a Hole in Her Stocking)" became a success in 1944 when it was recorded by a number of artists. Charted versions were by Russ Morgan, Evelyn Knight and Tony Pastor.
- In 1959, Bobby Darin released a song called "Plain Jane", whose chorus is based on "Buffalo Gals". It went to number 38 on the Billboard chart.
- A 1960 hit by Ray Smith, "Rockin' Little Angel" is based on the same melody.

== In popular culture ==
- The line "They danced by the light of the moon" shows up a little more than a quarter century later in Edward Lear's poem, "The Owl and the Pussy-Cat", published in 1870.
- In Frank Capra's 1946 film It's a Wonderful Life, Mary and George Bailey sing the song together in the scene where George "lassos" the Moon.
