= Dance Index =

Dance journal

- Discipline: Dance; Dance history
- Language: English

Publication details
- History: 1942–1948; 2017–present
- Publisher: Ballet Society (1948); Eakins Press (2017–present)
- Frequency: Biannually

Standard abbreviations
- ISO 4: Dance Index

Links
- Journal homepage

Dance Index is a dance journal founded by Lincoln Kirstein in 1942. Over the next seven years, 56 issues were published about dance. The writing and photography delved deeply into various aspects of dance and dance history.

== History ==
After establishing the journal in 1942, Kirstein wrote some of the articles, while others were written by writers such as Lillian Moore and Yury Slonimsky. The journal was unique for the era as it was entirely focused on dance history, written by professionals, where other journals had only had the occasional piece written by amateurs. It is considered an important journal for dance scholarship.

In 1948, the Ballet Society took over publishing Dance Index, though the journal ceased publication later in the same year.

In fall of 2017, the Ballet Society and Eakins Press began publishing Dance Index again, two issues a year. Around that time, they also put all 56 issues of the magazine from the 1940s online, for free.

Kirstein's papers and diaries are hosted in the Dance Collection at the New York Public Library for the Performing Arts.

== Content and scholarship ==
The first year of the journal concentrated on Americana, while some subsequent writing included European ballet. It generally ignored the modern dance of that time, except for one piece on Martha Graham.
