= Dan Emmett =

American entertainer and composer (1815–1904)

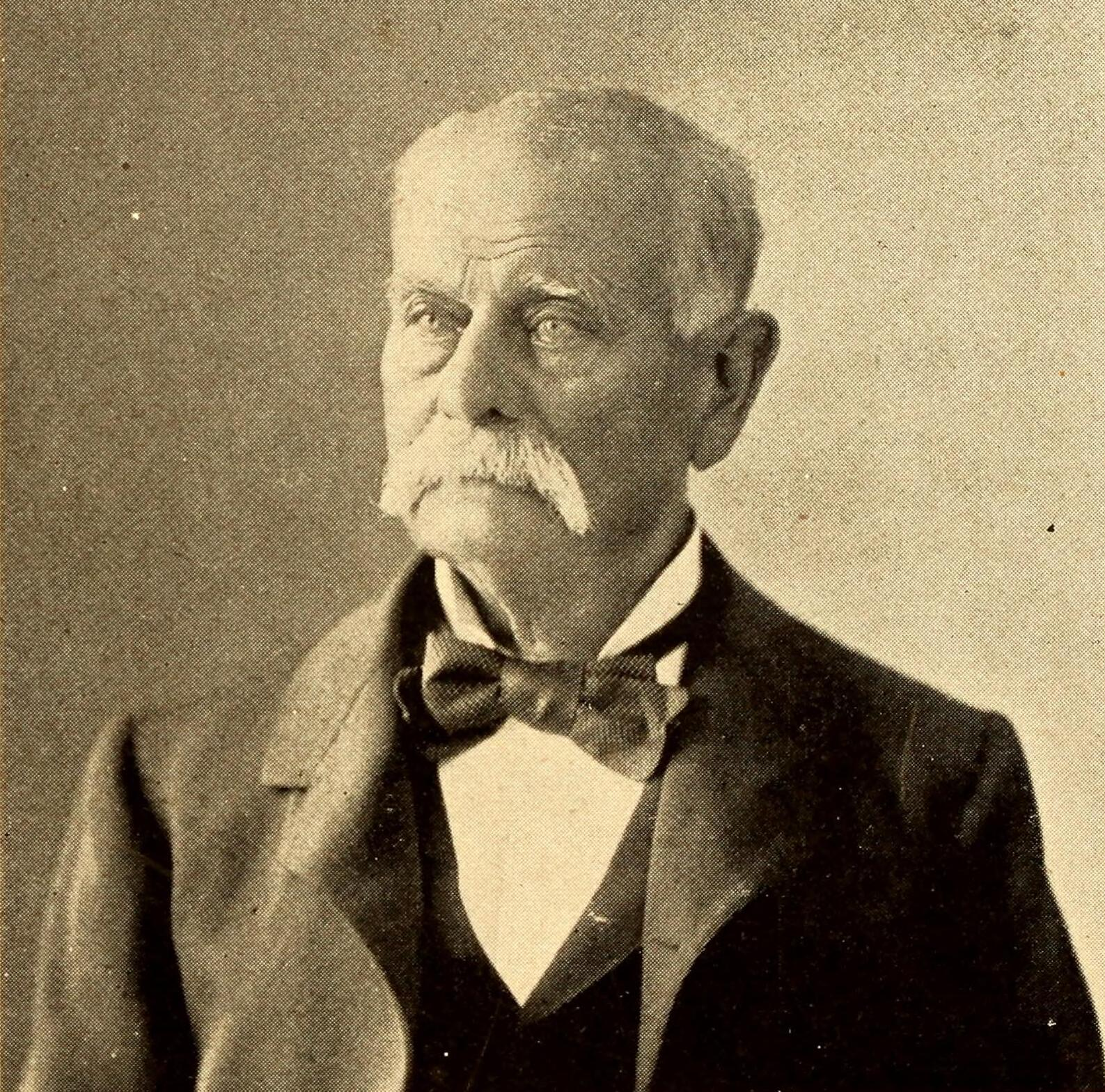
- Portrait of Emmett in 1895
- Born: Daniel Decatur Emmett; October 29, 1815; Mount Vernon, Ohio, U.S.
- Died: June 28, 1904 (aged 88); Mount Vernon, Ohio, U.S.
- Spouses: Catharine Rives (m. 1853; died 1875) Mary Bird (m. 1879)
- Military career
- Allegiance: United States
- Branch: United States Army
- Service years: 1834–1835
- Awards: Songwriters Hall of Fame (1970)
- Other work: Songwriter

Daniel Decatur Emmett (October 29, 1815 – June 28, 1904) was an American composer, entertainer, and founder of the first troupe of the blackface minstrel tradition, the Virginia Minstrels. He is most remembered as the composer of the song "Dixie".

== Early and family life ==
Dan Emmett was born in Mount Vernon, Ohio, then a frontier region.

His grandfather, Rev. John Emmett (1759–1847), had been born in Cecil County, Maryland, and after serving as a private in the American Revolutionary War and fighting at the Battle of White Plains in New York and later in Delaware, became a Methodist minister in the then-vast frontier of Augusta County, Virginia, and then moved across the Appalachian Mountains to Licking County, Ohio and also served in the Ohio legislature representing Pickaway County, Ohio in the Scioto River valley.

His father, Abraham Emmett (1791–1846), served as a private in the War of 1812 while his father served in the Ohio legislature.

Notwithstanding his grandfather's career, Dan had little formal education. He learned popular tunes from his musical mother, and taught himself to play the fiddle.

At age 13, Emmett became apprenticed to a printer and in 1836, when he was 21, enlisted in the United States Army. He became an expert fifer and drummer at Newport Barracks, Newport, Kentucky.

Emmett was a Catholic. He married Catharine Rives in 1853 in New York City, and they remained together until her death in 1875. Four years later, Emmett married Mary Bird (or Browner) in Chicago, Illinois; Emmett did not have children.

== Career ==
After receiving his discharge from the army on July 8, 1835, Emmett joined a Cincinnati circus. In 1840–1842 he toured with Angevine and other circuses as a blackface banjoist and singer. In association with Billy Whitlock, Dick Pelham, and Frank Brower, he organized the Virginia Minstrels, which made their first appearance before a paying audience at the Chatham Theatre in New York City in 1843.

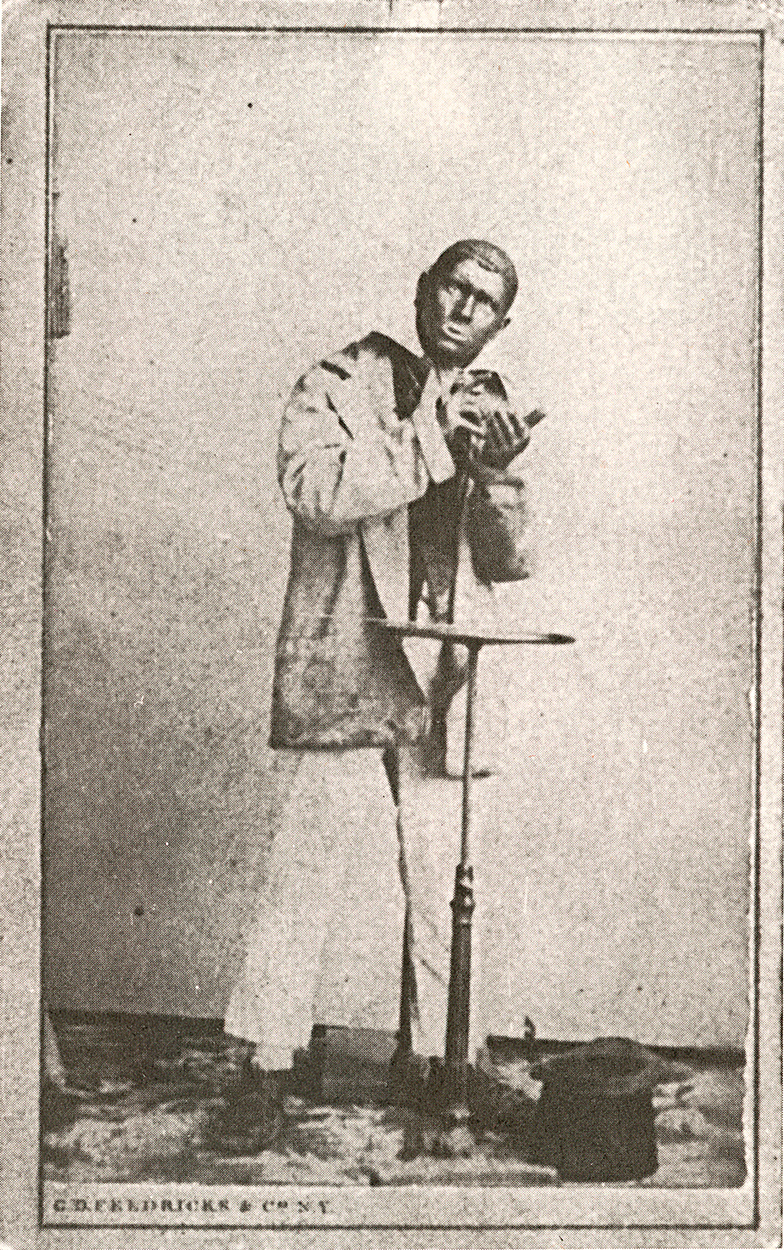
Photograph of Dan Emmett in blackface, likely during the early 1860s.

Although blackface performance, in which white men painted their faces and hands black and impersonated caricatures of African-American men and women, was already an established performance mode at that time—Thomas D. Rice had created the character of Jim Crow nearly a decade earlier, and blackface had been widely popular ever since—Emmett's group is said to be the first to "black up" an entire band rather than one or two performers. The group's full-length blackface performance is generally considered to have been the first true minstrel show: previous blackface acts were usually either an entr'acte for a play or one of many acts in a comic variety show.

Emmett is generally credited with writing the song "Dixie". The story that he related about its composition varied each time he told it, but the main points were that he composed the song in New York City while a member of Bryant's Minstrels. The song was first performed by Emmett and the Bryants at Mechanics' Hall in New York City on April 4, 1859. The song became a runaway hit, especially in the South, and it was the piece for which Emmett was best known. Emmett himself reportedly told a fellow minstrel: "If I had known to what use they [Southerners] were going to put my song, I will be damned if I'd have written it." After the South began using his song as a rallying call, Emmett wrote the fife-and-drum manual for the Union Army. In 1862, Emmett published his own Fifer's and Drummer's Guide in cooperation with George G. Bruce. Emmett's song was a favorite of President Abraham Lincoln, who said after the war ended in 1865, "I have always thought that 'Dixie' was one of the best tunes I ever heard... I insisted yesterday that we had fairly captured it."

Another writer named William Shakespeare Hays (1837–1907) (pen name: Will S. Hays) claimed to be the song's true author. Members of the Snowden Family, well known to Emmett in his Knox County youth, have also been named as writers of the song, namely John Baptist Snowden, a freed slave.

== Death and posthumous recognition ==
After a tour that was notably successful in the South, Emmett retired to his hometown of Mount Vernon in 1888 where he died on June 28, 1904, aged 88 years. From 1893 to the time of his death, he was aided by a weekly allowance from the Actors Fund of America. Emmett was inducted into the Songwriters Hall of Fame in 1970. A biographical film of his life was produced in 1943, titled Dixie. Starring Bing Crosby and Dorothy Lamour, the film is a musical directed by A. Edward Sutherland.

Numerous schools, businesses, and other institutions in Mount Vernon, Ohio, are named after Emmett. The official memorial to him is a large boulder with a placard attached located in front of the Knox County Historical Museum.

Emmett published at least 30 songs between 1843 and 1865, most of which are banjo tunes or walkarounds. Between 1859 and 1869, he composed another 25 tunes that are in manuscript at the State Library of Ohio in Columbus, Ohio.

He appears in Percival Everett's 2024 novel James.

== See also ==
- Category:Songs written by Dan Emmett
- Minstrel show
- Polly Wolly Doodle
- Dixie
