= Bowery Amphitheatre =

Building in Manhattan, New York City, US

- Interactive map of Bowery Amphitheatre
- Former names: Zoological Institute (1833–1835); Amphitheatre of the Republic (1842–1844); New Knickerbocker Theatre (1844–1849); Stadt Theater (1854–1863); The Varieties (1864–1865); Montpelier's Opera House (1865); New National Circus (1865); Peniel Mission (1897); Peniel Josephine Mission (1897–1900); Ragged Church (1900–1902)
- Address: 37 and 39 Bowery; New York City; U.S.
- Coordinates: 40°42′54″N 73°59′47″W
- Type: Menagerie; circus; theatre; roller rink; mission
- Current use: Site of Confucius Plaza

Construction
- Built: 1833
- Opened: 1833
- Closed: 1902
- Rebuilt: 1854
- Years active: 1833–1902

The Bowery Amphitheatre was a building in the Bowery neighborhood of New York City. It was located at 37 and 39 Bowery, across the street from the Bowery Theatre. Under a number of different names and managers, the structure served as a circus, menagerie, theatre, a roller rink, and a branch of the Peniel Mission. The site is now part of Confucius Plaza.

== Formation through the minstrel craze ==
A group of New York businessmen known as the Zoological Institute or the Flatfoots built the structure in 1833 as the site for a menagerie and circus performances. In 1835, the site was converted into an amphitheatre with a stage and a circus ring, and the name changed to the Bowery Amphitheatre. June, Titus, Angevine & Co. took up residence with their equestrian show.

The owners changed the name again in November 1842 to the Amphitheatre of the Republic. John Tryon leased the building the following year, remaining its operator until 1848. Following a performance by the Virginia Minstrels on February 6, 1843, Tryon gave the structure over largely to minstrel shows, renaming it the New Knickerbocker Theatre in 1844.

== Later management ==
In 1849, the building once again became a menagerie, this time under the management of June & Titus. The new endeavor failed to perform up to expectations, so in 1851 the amphitheatre became a circus instead. Seth B. Howe's circus company became a standard feature. During the 1852-1853 season, regular acts included the Richard Sands & Co. and John J. Nathans & Co. circuses. The next season saw a return to equestrian exhibitions under the management of Henry P. Madigan and Den W. Stone.

During the summer of 1854, Germans Seigrist and Otto Hoym leased the amphitheatre and rebuilt it. It opened on October 20, 1854, as the Stadt Theater. The Stadt specialized in German-language fare, but it also staged American and English drama. A succession of managers sustained this mixture until the 1863–1864 season, when the Stadt Theater moved to 45 Bowery, where it remained for 8 years, before returning to its original location. Adolf Neuendorff directed the Stadt from 1863 to 1867. In 1871 it was the venue for the first U.S. performance of Richard Wagner's opera Lohengrin.

On September 3, 1864, the theatre at 37 Bowery became known as The Varieties, making variety shows its main draw. This form lasted until mid-October 1865, when A. Montpelier became the manager and owner. He renamed the building Montpelier's Opera House, although he kept its emphasis on variety and melodrama. Montpelier changed the name once more on November 20, 1865. The New National Circus stayed open for six weeks for its final stint as an entertainment venue. The structure was converted into an armory in 1866.

In December 1897, 39 Bowery became the first East Coast branch of the Peniel Mission. It was directed by A. W. Dennet, who renamed it the Peniel Josephine Mission in honor of his wife. On November 30, 1900, Dennet changed his enterprise to the Ragged Church, which however closed after only two years. The site is now a part of the Confucius Plaza complex.
