= Virginia Minstrels =

19th-century American entertainers who first performed minstrel shows

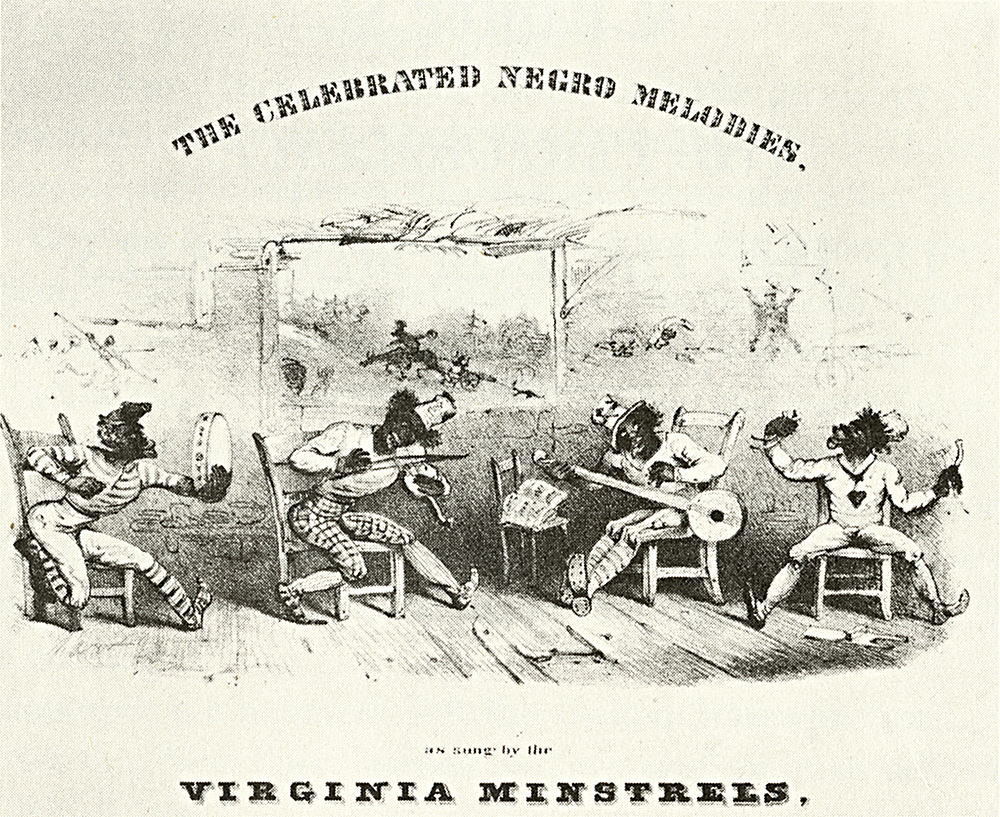
Detail from cover of The Celebrated Negro Melodies, as Sung by the Virginia Minstrels, 1843

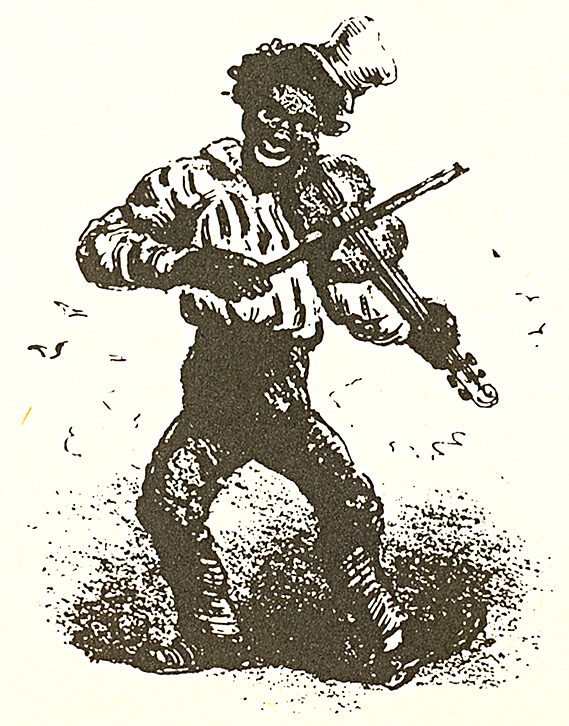
Dan Emmett performing in blackface

The Virginia Minstrels or Virginia Serenaders was a group of 19th-century American entertainers who helped invent the entertainment form known as the minstrel show. Led by Dan Emmett, the original lineup consisted of Emmett, Billy Whitlock, Dick Pelham, and Frank Brower.

After a successful try-out in the billiard parlor of the Branch Hotel on New York City's Bowery, the group is said to have premiered to a paying audience nearby at the Chatham Theatre, probably on January 31, 1843. They followed with a brief run at the Bowery Amphitheater in early February before an expanded schedule of venues.

== Early beginnings ==
Dan Emmett and Frank Brower both toured with The Cincinnati Circus Company during the spring of 1841. It was there that their friendship first began. Dan learned to play the banjo, and Frank accompanied him in the new song "Old Tar River." In early November 1841, the playbills announced Dan Emmett as a performer.

Dan and Frank then turned to New York City. As they were already quite respected, it did not take long for them to gain fame in New York. They began performing at the Chatham Theatre with a third performer named Pierce. It is assumed that Frank and Pierce danced to Dan's banjo accompaniment, which sometimes included vocal lines from one of the performers who wasn't dancing.

Frank briefly left the group in the middle of December 1842. Emmett and Pierce continued to perform and were billed as "the renowned Ethopian [sic?] Minstrel and his Little Darkey Ariel." A few weeks later, Dan Emmett and Frank Brower teamed up with Bill Whitlock and Dick Pelham, who were also popular blackface comedians. Bill Whitlock describes their formation as a happy accident, as Dan Emmett and Bill Whitlock were practicing together, and Frank Brower and Dick Pelham happened to come by and visit, joining in the practice session. After practicing for a while, they took their instruments down to the Branch Hotel and performed for the first time as the Virginia Minstrels.

== Troupe members ==
Dan Emmett - founding member and bones player, as well as banjo. Most famous for writing the song Dixie.

Frank Brower - toured with Dan in the circus, and would commonly accompany him in acts. Mainly a banjo player.

Billy Whitlock - would typically practice fiddle with Dan before he started the troupe. Was a large success in New York before the start of the troupe.

Dick Pelham - most established dancer out of the troupe. Played several instruments as well.

== Changes to the minstrel show ==
The main difference between the Virginia Minstrels and earlier minstrel shows was the type of performance the audience experienced. Their marketing and presentation on stage resembled that of the Hutchinson Family Singers, a group earning at least ten times the performance fees paid to minstrel troupes. While the Virginia Minstrels weren't the first blackface performers to band together and present a show, they were the first to present a concert.

== Critical reception ==
The change of perception from being a variety show to being a concert afforded the Virginia Minstrels with patrons of a slightly upper class. Their work was deemed as refined and a breath of fresh air in the New York scene.

One critic wrote: "Chaste, Pleasing and Elegant!" - "The Virginia Minstrels, who have been giving their novel and refined concerts at the Temple in Boston, and have been so liberally patronized by the elite of that city, beg most respectfully to announce to the Ladies and Gentlemen of Worcester, that they intend giving their last concert at Brinley Hall, on Wednesday eve'g, Mar. 22"

The editorial that accompanied this notice stated "The harmony and skill with which the banjo, violin, castinets, and tambourine are blended by these truly original minstrels, in their Ethiopian characters, is a redeeming feature to this species of amusement, and cannot fail of making it acceptable to the most refined and sensitive audience."

== Significant works ==
Unlike earlier blackface acts that featured solo singers or dancers, the Virginia Minstrels appeared as a group in blackface and what would become iconic costumes and performed more elaborate shows. In March 1843 they appeared in Welch's Olympic Circus as part of an equestrian act. Although they primarily appeared within a larger schedule of entertainment in their earliest months, they surely were the first minstrels to also be hired to perform by themselves at smaller venues.

Among other things, they are credited with the songs "Jimmy Crack Corn" and "Old Dan Tucker", which passed into American folk culture.
