= Dixie (song) =

Mid-19th century American minstrel song

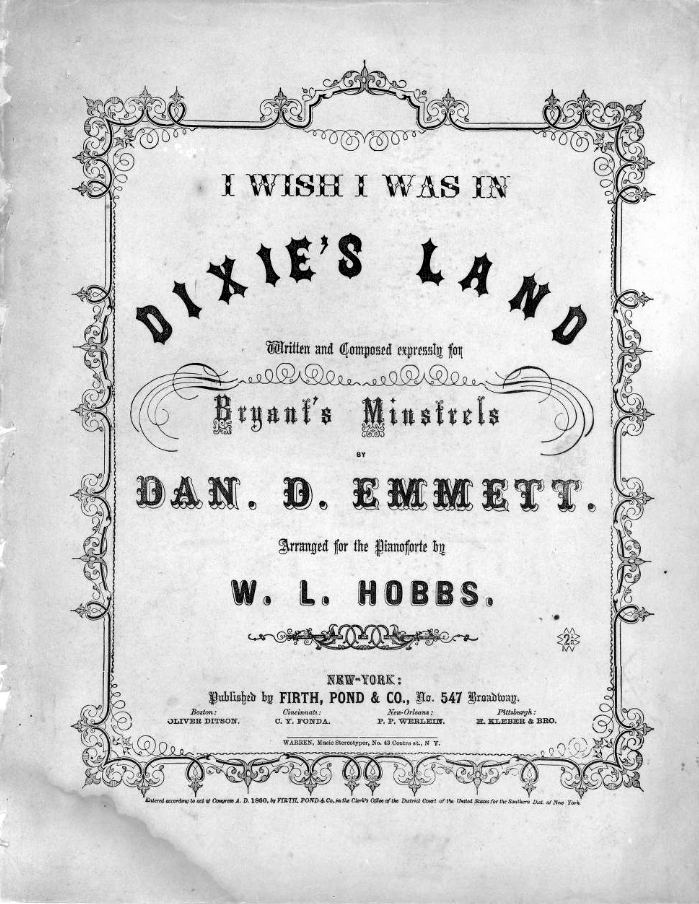
- Unofficial national anthem of the Confederate States of America
- Also known as: Dixie's Land; I Wish I Was in Dixie
- Lyrics: probably Dan Emmett, 1859
- Music: Dan Emmett, 1859

Audio sample
- Instrumental version: file; help

"Dixie", also known as "Dixie's Land", "I Wish I Was in Dixie", and by other titles, is a song first published in 1860 that is strongly associated with the Southern United States. It was not a folk song at its creation but has since entered the American folk vernacular. The song popularized the word Dixie in the American vocabulary as a nickname for the South.

Most sources credit Ohio-born Daniel Decatur Emmett with the song's composition, although other people have claimed credit, even during Emmett's lifetime. Compounding the problem are Emmett's own confused accounts of its writing and his tardiness in registering its copyright.

"Dixie" originated in the minstrel shows of the 1850s and quickly became popular throughout the country. During the American Civil War, it was adopted as a de facto national anthem of the Confederacy, along with "The Bonnie Blue Flag" and "God Save the South". New versions appeared at this time that more explicitly tied the song to the events of the Civil War.

== Origins ==
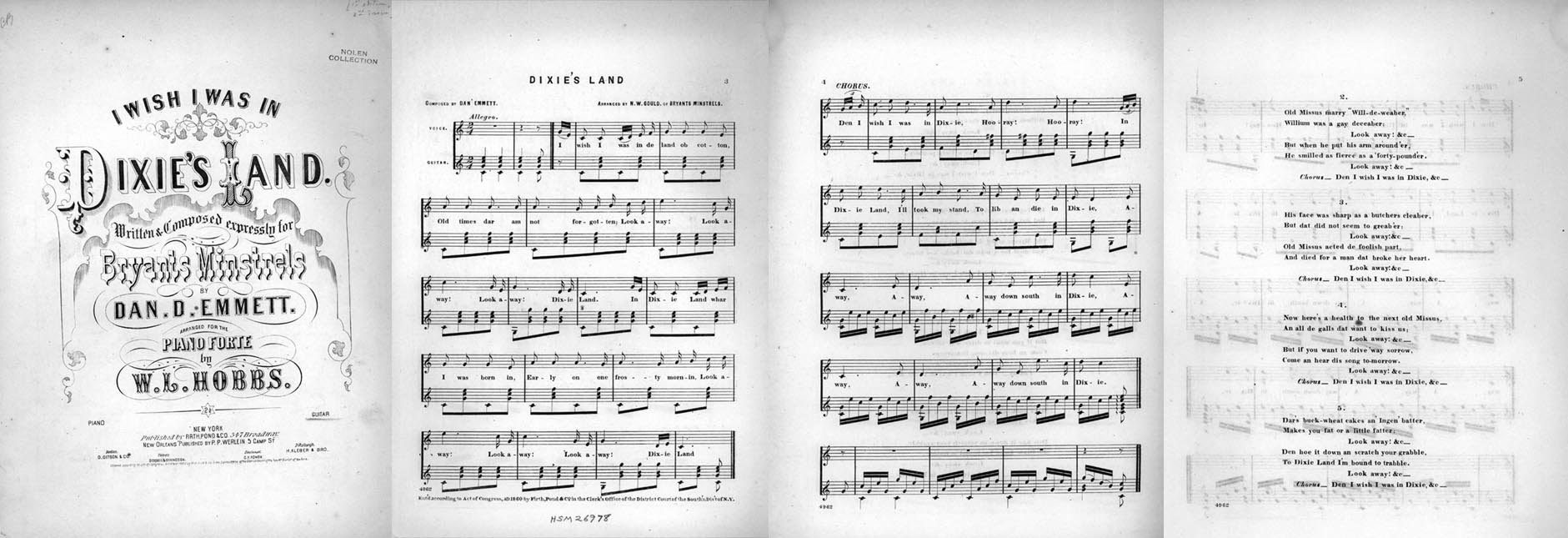
"I Wish I Was in Dixie's Land" sheet music

Ohio-born minstrel show composer Daniel Decatur Emmett claimed the copyright on "Dixie" in 1860. Despite that, by 1908, four years after Emmett's death – alternatively, during his lifetime (Note: Sacks & Sacks 1993, p. 3 "By the time of Emmett's death in 1904 ...".) – no fewer than 37 people had claimed the song as theirs.

Emmett himself often recounted his story of its composition, and the details varied. At different times Emmett said he had written "Dixie" in a few minutes, in a single night, and over a few days. An 1872 edition of the New York Clipper provides one of the earliest accounts, relating that on a Saturday night shortly after Emmett had been taken on as a songwriter for the Bryant's Minstrels, Jerry Bryant told him they would need a new walkaround by the following Monday. By this account, Emmett shut himself inside his New York apartment and wrote the song that Sunday evening. The playbill for Jerry Bryant's Minstrel Show dated Monday, April 4, 1859, lists the first performance of "Dixie's Land" at Mechanics' Hall, New York.

Other details are given in later accounts. In one, Emmett said, "Suddenly... I jumped up and sat down at the table to work. In less than an hour, I had the first verse and chorus. After that it was easy." In another version, Emmett stared out at the rainy evening and thought, "I wish I was in Dixie." Then, "Like a flash the thought suggested the first line of the walk-around, and a little later the minstrel, fiddle in hand, was working out the melody" (a different story has it that Emmett's wife uttered the famous line). Yet another variant, dated to 1903, further changes the details: "I was standing by the window, gazing out at the drizzly, raw day, and the old circus feeling came over me. I hummed the old refrain, 'I wish I was in Dixie', and the inspiration struck me. I took my pen and in ten minutes had written the first verses with music. The remaining verses were easy." In his final years, Emmett even said he had written the song years before he had moved to New York. An article in The Washington Post supports this, giving a composition date of 1843. It is also suggested that 'Dixie's Land' refers to a Long Island named for owner John Dixie, who befriended slaves who worked on his farm until slavery was abolished in New York state.

Emmett published the song (under the title "I Wish I Was in Dixie's Land") on June 21, 1860, through Firth, Pond & Co. in New York. The original manuscript has been lost; extant copies were made during Emmett's retirement, starting in the 1890s. Emmett's tardiness registering the copyright for the song allowed it to proliferate among other minstrel groups and variety show performers. Rival editions and variations multiplied in song books, newspapers and broadsides. The earliest of these that is known today is a copyrighted edition for piano from the John Church Company of Cincinnati, published on June 26, 1860. Other publishers attributed the song to obviously made-up names, such as "Jerry Blossom" and "Dixie, Jr." among others. The most serious challenge to Emmett's claim to the song during his lifetime came from Southerner William Shakespeare Hays; Hays attempted to prove his allegations through a Southern historical society, but died before they could produce any conclusive evidence.

"Dixie" is the only song Emmett ever claimed was the result of a burst of inspiration, and analysis of Emmett's notes and writings shows "a meticulous copyist, [who] spent countless hours collecting and composing songs and sayings for the minstrel stage ... ; little evidence was left for the improvisational moment." The New York Clipper wrote in 1872 that "[Emmett's] claim to authorship of 'Dixie' was and is still disputed, both in and out of the minstrel profession." Emmett himself said, "Show people generally, if not always, have the chance to hear every local song as they pass through the different sections of [the] country, and particularly so with minstrel companies, who are always on the look out for songs and sayings that will answer their business." He claimed at one point to have based the first part of "Dixie" on "Come Philander Let's Be Marchin, Every One for His True Love Searchin", which he described as a "song of his childhood days". Musical analysis does show some similarities in the melodic outline, but the songs are not closely related. Emmett also credited "Dixie" to an old circus song. Despite the disputed authorship, Firth, Pond & Co. paid Emmett $300 for all rights to "Dixie" on February 11, 1861, perhaps fearing complications spurred by the impending Civil War. (Note: Sacks & Sacks 1993, p. 212 n. 4, call $300 "a sum even then considered small"; Abel 2000, p. 31, says that it was "a sizable amount of money in those days, especially for a song"; Nathan 1962, p. 269, does not comment on the fairness of the deal.)

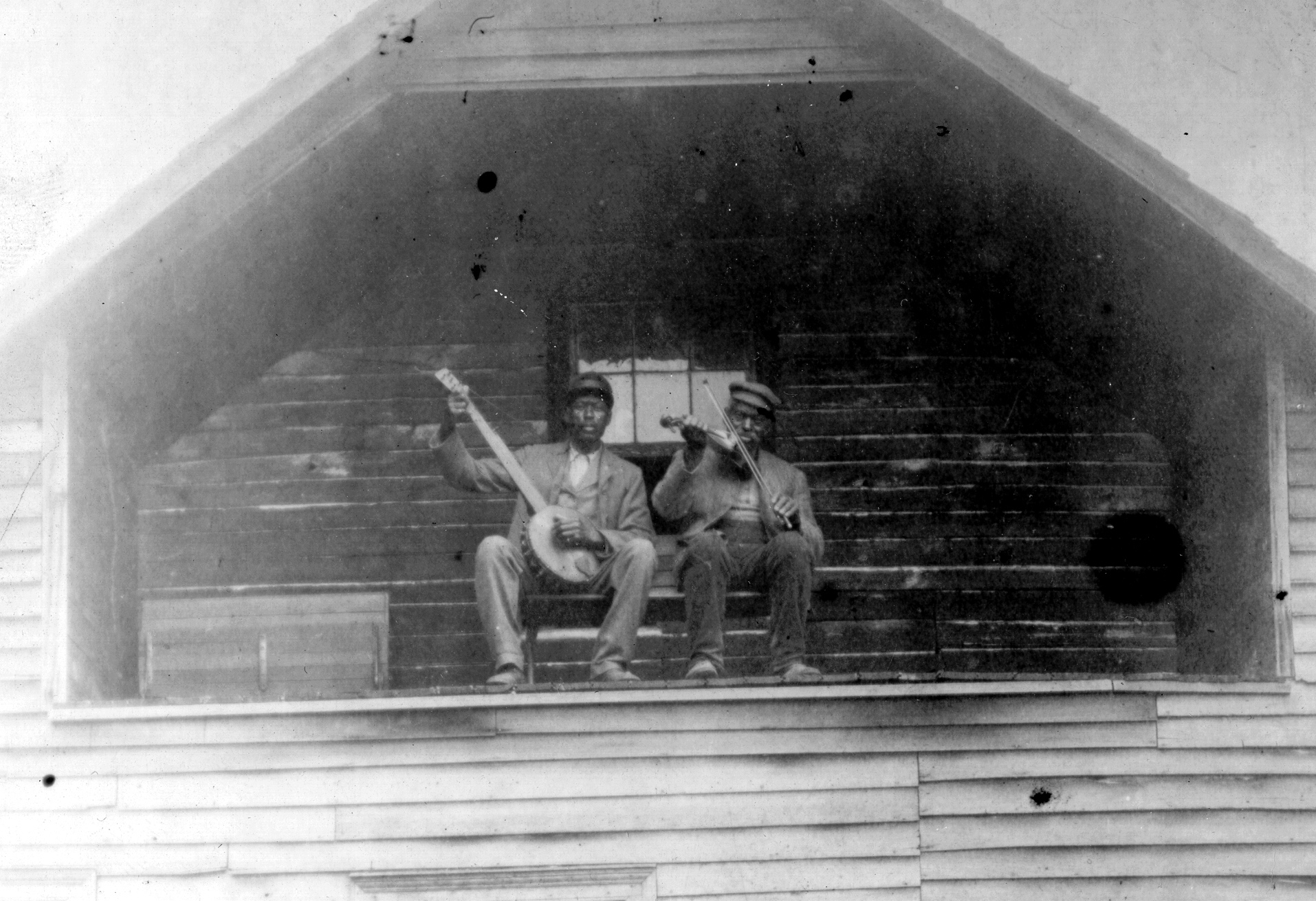
Lew and Ben Snowden on banjo and fiddle in the second-story gable of their home, Clinton, Knox County, Ohio, c. 1890s

On at least one occasion, Emmett attributed "Dixie" to an unnamed Southern black man, and some of his contemporaries said that the song was based on an old African American folk tune. At the time, minstrels often billed themselves as authentic delineators of slave material, and the names of the black songwriters they had chanced to meet were rarely given. A Mount Vernon, Ohio, tradition, which dates to the 1910s or 1920s at the latest, gives some support to this possibility: Many Mount Vernon residents claim that Emmett collaborated informally with a pair of black musicians named Ben and Lew Snowden of the Snowden Family Band. In original form this tradition is not credible: While Emmett likely did meet and play with Ben and Lew Snowden when he retired to Knox County, the Snowden brothers would have been only small children in 1860. Howard L. Sacks and Judith Sacks suggest that the Ohio legend may in fact be off by a generation, and that Emmett could have collaborated instead with the Snowden parents, Thomas and Ellen. Advocates of the Snowden theory believe that the lyrics of "Dixie" are a protest through irony and parody against the institution of slavery. (Note: This variant of "Dixie" appears in the September 1895 issue of Confederate Veteran; the first verse was also printed in Werlein's "I Wish I Was in Dixies [sic] Land", published in New Orleans in 1860. Abel 2000, p. 32, and Silber 1995, p. 51, call it a Northern parody. Nathan 1962, p. 359, and Sacks & Sacks 1993, p. 247 n. 54, on the other hand, claim it is the closest representation of the original lyrics.) At his death in 1923, Lew Snowden owned a small box of newspaper clippings asserting Emmett's authorship of "Dixie" along with a framed photograph of Emmett with the text "Author of 'Dixie'!" written under the minstrel's name. Scholars such as Clint Johnson, Robert James Branham, and Stephen J. Hartnett accept the claims of black origin for the song or at least allow for the possibility. Nevertheless, many scholars, such as E. Lawrence Abel, dismiss the Snowden claims outright.

== Analysis ==
=== Structure ===
"Dixie", performed in 1916

"Dixie" is structured into five two-measure groups of alternating verses and refrains, following an AABC pattern. As originally performed, a soloist or small group stepped forward and sang the verses, and the whole company answered at different times; the repeated line "look away" was probably one part sung in unison like this. As the song became popular, the audience likely joined the troupe in singing the chorus. Traditionally, another eight measures of unaccompanied fiddle playing followed, coming to a partial close in the middle; since 1936, this part has rarely been printed with the sheet music.

The song was traditionally played at a tempo slower than the one usually played today. Rhythmically, the music is "characterized by a heavy, nonchalant, inelegant strut," and is in duple meter, which makes it suitable for both dancing and marching. "Dixie" employs a single rhythmic motive (two sixteenth note pickups followed by a longer note), which is integrated into long, melodic phrases. The melodic content consists primarily of arpeggiations of the tonic triad, firmly establishing the major tonality. The melody of the chorus emulates natural inflections of the voice (particularly on the word "away"), and may account for some of the song's popularity.

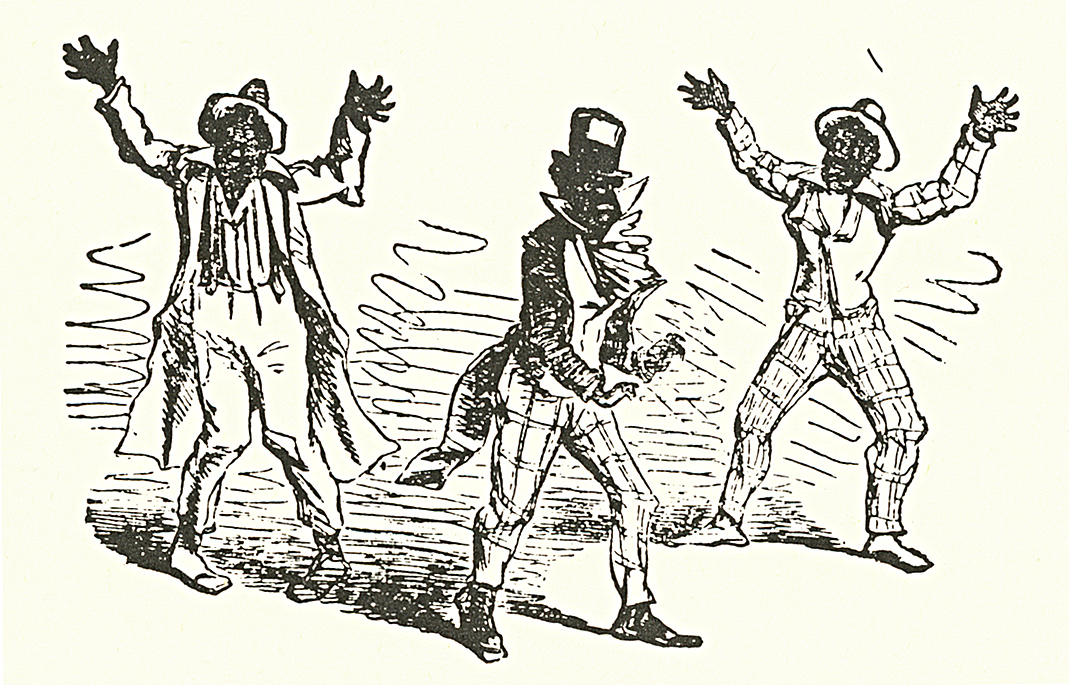
Detail from a playbill of the Bryant's Minstrels depicting the first part of a walkaround, dated December 19, 1859

According to musicologist Hans Nathan, "Dixie" resembles other material that Dan Emmett wrote for Bryant's Minstrels, and in writing it, the composer drew on a number of earlier works. The first part of the song is anticipated by other Emmett compositions, including "De Wild Goose-Nation" (1844), itself a derivative of "Gumbo Chaff" (1830s) and ultimately an 18th-century English song called "Bow Wow Wow". The second part is possibly related to other material, most likely Scottish folk songs. The chorus follows portions of "Johnny Roach," an Emmett piece from earlier in 1859.

As with other blackface material, performances of "Dixie" were accompanied by dancing. The song is a walkaround, which originally began with a few minstrels acting out the lyrics, only to be joined by the rest of the company (a dozen or so individuals for the Bryants). As shown by the original sheet music (see below), the dance tune used with "Dixie" by Bryant's Minstrels, who introduced the song on the New York stage, was "Albany Beef", an Irish-style reel later included by Dan Emmett in an instructional book he co-authored in 1862. Dancers probably performed between verses, and a single dancer used the fiddle solo at the end of the song to "strut, twirl his cane, or mustache, and perhaps slyly wink at a girl on the front row".

=== Lyrics ===
Countless lyrical variants of "Dixie" exist, but the version attributed to Dan Emmett and its variations are the most popular. Emmett's lyrics as they were originally intended reflect the hostile mood of many white Southerners in the late 1850s towards increasing abolitionist sentiments in the Northern United States. The song presented the point of view, common to minstrelsy at the time, that slavery in the United States was a positive good. The character of the pining slave had been used in minstrel tunes since the early 1850s, including Emmett's "I Ain't Got Time to Tarry" and "Johnny Roach". The fact that "Dixie" and its precursors were dance tunes only further made light of the subject. In short, "Dixie" made the case, more strongly than any previous minstrel tune had, that African Americans ought to be enslaved. This was accomplished through the song's protagonist, who, speaking in an exaggerated black dialect, implies that despite his freedom, he is homesick for the slave plantation he was born on.

The lyrics use many common phrases found in minstrel tunes of the day—"I wish I was in ..." dates to at least "Clare de Kitchen" (early 1830s), and "Away down south in ..." appears in many more songs, including Emmett's "I'm Gwine ober de Mountain" (1843). The second stanza clearly echoes "Gumbo Chaff" from the 1830s: "Den Missus she did marry Big Bill de weaver / Soon she found out he was a gay deceiver." The final stanza rewords portions of Emmett's own "De Wild Goose-Nation": "De tarapin he thot it was time for to trabble / He screw aron his tail and begin to scratch grabble." Even the phrase "Dixie's land" had been used in Emmett's "Johnny Roach", performed earlier in February 1859. However, his "Dixie" would immortalize the term. (Note: The origins of the name Dixie are uncertain, but the prevailing theory is that it stems from the Mason–Dixon line which defined the boundary between free states and slave states.)

While "Dixie" evolved and took many forms, with performers frequently adding their own verses or parodic alterations, the chorus largely remained unchanged. Today, the most widely recognized version of "Dixie" is often sung in standard English and focuses on the chorus, which has become emblematic of the song. The first verse and chorus, in their best-known non-dialect form, are as follows:

I wish I was in the land of cotton, old times there are not forgotten,
Look away, look away, look away, Dixie Land.
In Dixie Land where I was born in, early on a frosty mornin',
Look away, look away, look away, Dixie Land.

Then I wish I was in Dixie, hooray! hooray!
In Dixie Land I'll take my stand to live and die in Dixie,
Away, away, away down South in Dixie,
Away, away, away down South in Dixie.

As with other minstrel material, "Dixie" entered common circulation among blackface performers, and many of them added their own verses or altered the song in other ways. Emmett himself adopted the tune for a pseudo-African American spiritual in the 1870s or 1880s. (Note: In one instance, the chorus changed to: I wish I was in Dixie Hooray, Hooray! In Dixie's land, I'll take my stand to live and die in Dixie! Away, away, away down South in Dixie! Away, away, away down South in Dixie!)

Both Union and Confederate composers produced war versions of the song during the American Civil War. These variants standardized the spelling and made the song more militant, replacing the slave scenario with specific references to the conflict or to Northern or Southern pride. This Confederate verse by Albert Pike is representative:

Southrons! hear your country call you!
Up! lest worse than death befall you! ...
Hear the Northern thunders mutter! ...
Northern flags in South wind flutter; ...
Send them back your fierce defiance!
Stamp upon the cursed alliance!

Union variants of the lyrics also existed, such as Frances J. Crosby's: (Note: Another was the "Union Dixie", with the first verse and chorus: Away down south in the land of traitors, Rattlesnakes and alligators, Right away, come away, right away, right away. Where cotton's king and men are chattels, Union boys will win the battles, Right away, come away, right away, right away. Then we'll all go down to Dixie, Away, away, Each Dixie boy must understand, that he must mind his Uncle Sam Away, away, And we'll all go down to Dixie. Away, away, And we'll all go down to Dixie.)

On! ye patriots to the battle,
Hear Fort Moultrie's cannon rattle!
Then away, then away, then away to the fight!
Go meet those Southern traitors,
With iron will.
And should your courage falter, boys,
Remember Bunker Hill.

Hurrah! Hurrah! The Stars and Stripes forever!
Hurrah! Hurrah! Our Union shall not sever!

Soldiers on both sides wrote endless parody versions of the song. Often these discussed the banalities of camp life: "Pork and cabbage in the pot, / It goes in cold and comes out hot," or, "Vinegar put right on red beet, / It makes them always fit to eat." Others were more nonsensical: "Way down South in the fields of cotton, / Vinegar shoes and paper stockings."

== Reception ==
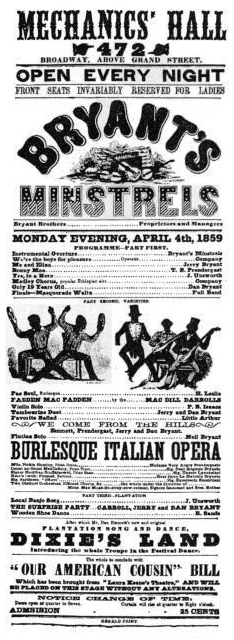
Detail from a playbill for Bryant's Minstrels at April 4, 1859, premiere of "Dixie", Mechanics' Hall, New York City

Bryant's Minstrels premiered "Dixie" in New York City on April 4, 1859, as part of their blackface minstrel show. (Note: Nathan 1962, p. 245, states that the date of the first performance is often given incorrectly.) The walkaround was billed as a "plantation song and dance". It was a runaway success, and the Bryants quickly made it their standard closing number.

"Dixie" quickly gained wide recognition and status as a minstrel standard, and it helped rekindle interest in plantation material from other troupes, particularly in the third act. It became a favorite of Abraham Lincoln and was played during his campaign in 1860. The New York Clipper wrote that it was "one of the most popular compositions ever produced" and that it had "been sung, whistled, and played in every quarter of the globe". Buckley's Serenaders performed the song in London in late 1860, and by the end of the decade, it had found its way into the repertoire of British sailors. As the American Civil War broke out, one New Yorker wrote, "'Dixie' has become an institution, an irrepressible institution in this section of the country ..."

The Rumsey and Newcomb Minstrels brought "Dixie" to New Orleans in March 1860; the walkaround became the hit of their show. That April, Mrs. John Wood sang "Dixie" in a John Brougham burlesque called Po-ca-hon-tas, or The Gentle Savage, increasing the song's popularity in New Orleans. On the surface "Dixie" seems an unlikely candidate for a Southern hit; it has a Northern composer, stars a black protagonist, is intended as a dance song, and lacks any of the patriotic bluster of most national hymns and marches. Had it not been for the atmosphere of sectionalism in which "Dixie" debuted, it might have faded into obscurity. Nevertheless, the refrain "In Dixie Land I'll took my stand / To lib an die in Dixie", coupled with the first verse and its sanguine picture of the South, struck a chord. Woods's New Orleans audience demanded no fewer than seven encores.

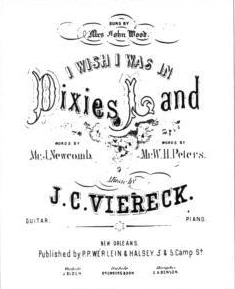
Unauthorized sheet music to "Dixie", published by P. P. Werlein and Halsey of New Orleans, Louisiana, in 1861

The New Orleans publisher P. P. Werlein took advantage and published "Dixie" in New Orleans. He credited music to J. C. Viereck and Newcomb for lyrics. When the minstrel denied authorship, Werlein changed the credit to W. H. Peters. Werlein's version, subtitled "Sung by Mrs. John Wood," was the first "Dixie" to do away with the faux black dialect and misspellings. The publication did not go unnoticed, and Firth Pond & Co. threatened to sue. The date on Werlein's sheet music precedes that of Firth, Pond & Co.'s version, but Emmett later recalled that Werlein had sent him a letter offering to buy the rights for $5. In a New York musical publishers' convention, Firth, Pond & Co. succeeded in convincing those present that Emmett was the composer. In future editions of Werlein's arrangement, Viereck is merely credited as "arranger".

"Dixie" quickly spread to the rest of the South, enjoying vast popularity. By the end of 1860, secessionists had adopted it as theirs; on December 20 the band played "Dixie" after each vote for secession at St. Andrew's Hall in Charleston, South Carolina. On February 18, 1861, the song took on something of the air of national anthem when it was played at the inauguration of Jefferson Davis, arranged as a quickstep by Herman Frank Arnold, and possibly for the first time as a band arrangement. (Note: A monument in Montgomery, Alabama, on the site of the inauguration reads, "Dixie was played as a band arrangement for the first time on this occasion", quoted in Sacks & Sacks 1993, p. 4.) Emmett himself reportedly told a fellow minstrel that year that "If I had known to what use they were going to put my song, I will be damned if I'd have written it."

In May 1861 Confederate Henry Hotze wrote:

It is marvellous with what wild-fire rapidity this tune "Dixie" has spread over the whole South. Considered as an intolerable nuisance when first the streets re-echoed it from the repertoire of wandering minstrels, it now bids fair to become the musical symbol of a new nationality, and we shall be fortunate if it does not impose its very name on our country.

Southerners who shunned the song's low origins and comedic nature changed the lyrics, usually to focus on Southern pride and the war. Albert Pike's enjoyed the most popularity; the Natchez (Mississippi) Courier published it on May 30, 1861, as "The War Song of Dixie," followed by Werlein, who again credited Viereck for composition. Henry Throop Stanton published another war-themed "Dixie," which he dedicated to "the Boys in Virginia". The defiant "In Dixie Land I'll take my stand / To live and die in Dixie" were the only lines used with any consistency. The tempo also quickened, as the song was a useful quickstep tune. Confederate soldiers, by and large, preferred these war versions to the original minstrel lyrics. "Dixie" was probably the most popular song for Confederate soldiers on the march, in battle, and at camp.

Southerners who rallied to the song proved reluctant to acknowledge a Yankee as its composer. Accordingly, some ascribed it a longer tradition as a folk song. The poet John Hill Hewitt wrote in 1862 that "The homely air of 'Dixie,' of extremely doubtful origin ... [is] generally believed to have sprung from a noble stock of Southern stevedore melodies."

Meanwhile, many Northern abolitionists took offense to the South's appropriation of "Dixie" because it was originally written as a satirical critique of the institution of slavery in the South. Before even the fall of Fort Sumter, Frances J. Crosby published "Dixie for the Union" and "Dixie Unionized". The tune formed part of the repertoire of both Union bands and common troops until 1863. Broadsides circulated with titles like "The Union 'Dixie'" or "The New Dixie, the True 'Dixie' for Northern Singers". Northern renditions of "Dixie" disagreed with the Southerners over the institution of slavery and this dispute, at the center of the divisiveness and destructiveness of the American Civil War, played out in the culture of American folk music through the disputes over the meaning of this song. Emmett himself arranged "Dixie" for the military in a book of fife instruction in 1862, and a 1904 work by Charles Burleigh Galbreath claims that Emmett gave his official sanction to Crosby's Union lyrics. At least 39 versions of the song, both vocal and instrumental, were published between 1860 and 1866. Northerners, Emmett among them, also declared that the "Dixie Land" of the song was actually in the North. One common story, still cited today yet one with little impact, claimed that Dixie was a Manhattan slave owner who had sent his slaves south just before New York's 1827 banning of slavery.

The song was a favorite of Kentucky native President Abraham Lincoln, who had it played at some of his political rallies. On April 10, 1865, one day after the surrender of General Robert E. Lee, Lincoln requested "Dixie" be played before a White House crowd, noting, "I had heard that our adversaries over the way had attempted to appropriate it. I insisted yesterday that we had fairly captured it ..."

== Recordings ==
Early recordings of the song include band versions by Issler's Orchestra (c. 1895), Gilmore's Band (1896), and the Edison Grand Concert Band (1896), and a vocal version by George J. Gaskin (1896).

The Norman Luboff Choir recorded it for the 1956 album Songs of the South. This version was used on numerous sign-ons and sign-offs for Southern US TV and radio stations, including WRAL-TV, WBBR, WQOK and WALT.

== Legacy ==
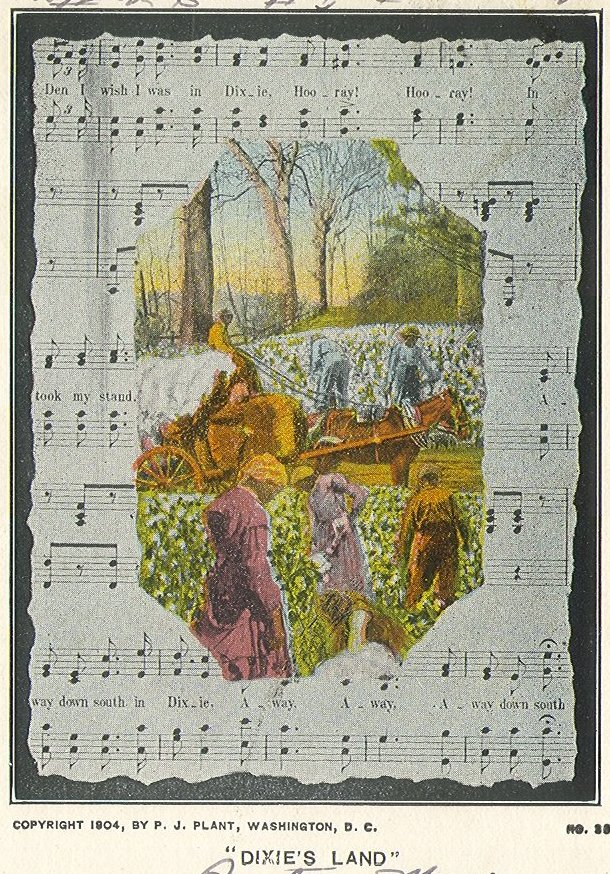
"Dixie's Land", 1904 postcard

"Dixie" slowly re-entered Northern repertoires, mostly in private performances. New Yorkers resurrected stories about "Dixie" being a part of Manhattan, thus reclaiming the song for themselves. The New York Weekly wrote, "... no one ever heard of Dixie's land being other than Manhattan Island until recently, when it has been erroneously supposed to refer to the South, from its connection with pathetic negro allegory." In 1888 the publishers of a Boston songbook included "Dixie" as a "patriotic song," and in 1895 the Confederate Veterans' Association suggested a celebration in honor of "Dixie" and Emmett in Washington as a bipartisan tribute.

However, "Dixie" was still most strongly associated with the South. Northern singers and writers often used it for parody or as a quotation in other pieces to establish a person or setting as Southern. For example, African Americans Eubie Blake and Noble Sissle quoted "Dixie" in the song "Bandana Days" for their 1921 musical Shuffle Along. In 1905 the United Daughters of the Confederacy mounted a campaign to acknowledge an official Southern version of the song (one that would purge it forever of its African American associations). Although they obtained the support of the United Confederate Veterans and the United Sons of Confederate Veterans, Emmett's death the year before turned sentiments against the project, and the groups were ultimately unsuccessful in having any of the 22 entries universally adopted. The song was played at the dedication of Confederate monuments like Confederate Private Monument in Centennial Park, Nashville, Tennessee, on June 19, 1909.

As African Americans entered minstrelsy, they exploited the song's popularity in the South by playing "Dixie" as they first arrived in a Southern town. According to Tom Fletcher, a black minstrel of the time, it tended to please those who might otherwise be antagonistic to the arrival of a group of black men.

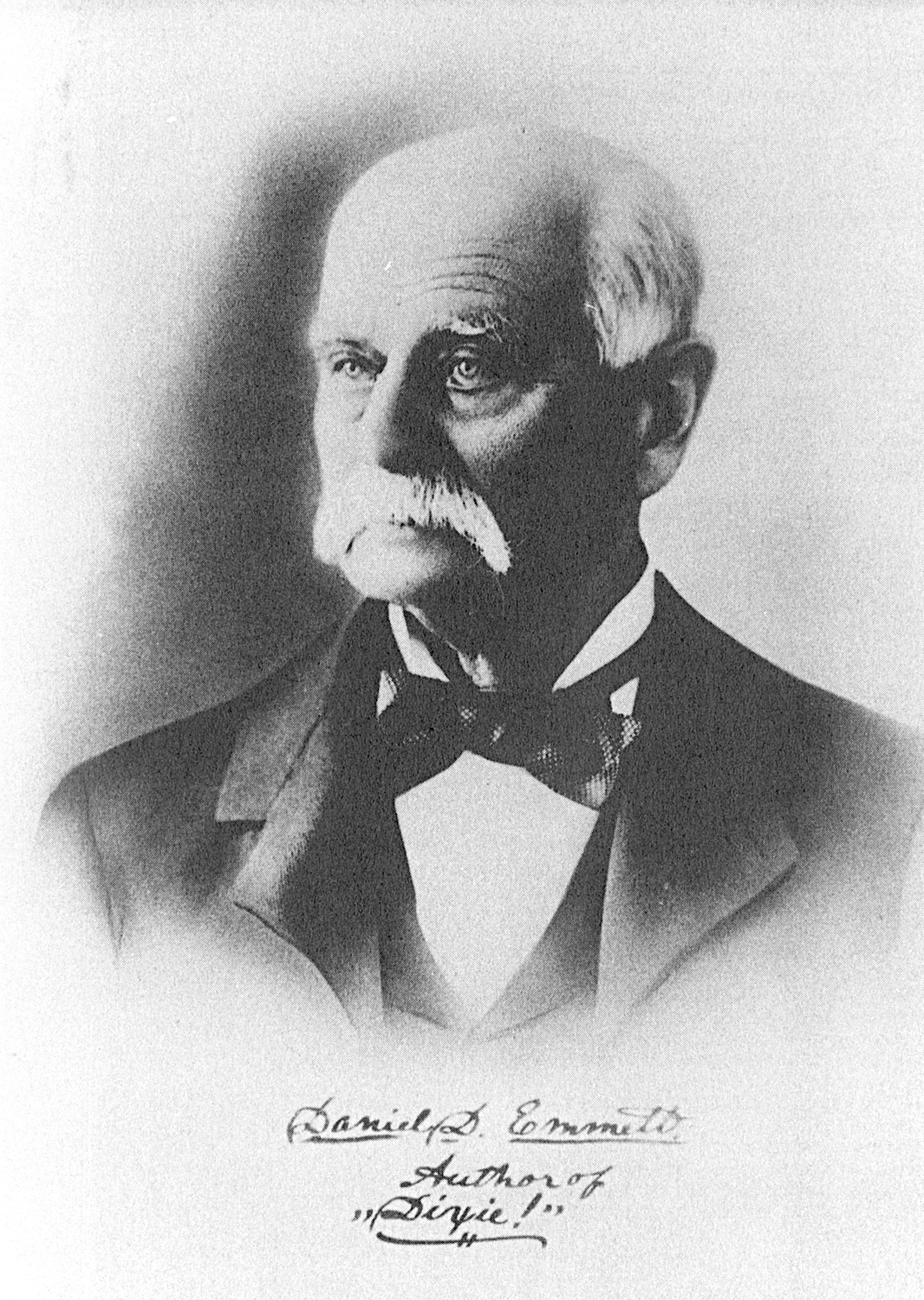
Photograph of Dan Emmett with "Author of 'Dixie!'" written across the bottom. The portrait belonged to Ben and Lew Snowden of Knox County, Ohio.

Still, "Dixie" was not rejected outright in the North. An article in the New York Tribune, c. 1908, said that "though 'Dixie' came to be looked upon as characteristically a song of the South, the hearts of the Northern people never grew cold to it. President Lincoln loved it, and to-day it is the most popular song in the country, irrespective of section." As late as 1934, the music journal The Etude asserted that "the sectional sentiment attached to Dixie has been long forgotten; and today it is heard everywhere—North, East, South, West."

"Dixie" had become Emmett's most enduring legacy. In the 1900 census of Knox County, Emmett's occupation is given as "author of Dixie". The band at Emmett's funeral played "Dixie" as he was lowered into his grave. His grave marker, placed 20 years after his death, reads,

To the Memory of
Daniel Decatur Emmett
1815–1904
Whose Song 'Dixie Land' inspired the courage
and Devotion of the Southern People and now
Thrills the Hearts of a Reunited Nation.

=== Modern interpretations ===
Since the beginning in the Civil rights movement in the 1950s and 1960s, African Americans have frequently criticised "Dixie", saying it is a racist relic of the Confederacy and a reminder of decades of white domination and segregation. This position was amplified when white opponents to civil rights began answering songs such as "We Shall Overcome" with the song "Dixie".

The earliest of these protests came from students of Southern universities, where "Dixie" was a staple of a number of marching bands. Similar protests have since occurred at the University of Virginia, the Georgia Institute of Technology, and Tulane University. In 1968, the President of the University of Miami banned the song from its band's performances.

The debate has since moved beyond student populations. Members of the 75th United States Army Band protested "Dixie" in 1971. In 1989, three black Georgia senators walked out when the Miss Georgia Sweet Potato Queen sang "Dixie" in the Georgia chamber. Some musicologists have challenged the song as racist. For example, Sam Dennison writes that "Today, the performance of 'Dixie' still conjures visions of an unrepentant, militarily recalcitrant South, ready to reassert its aged theories of white supremacy at any moment.... This is why the playing of 'Dixie' still causes hostile reactions."

Supporters consider the song a part of the patriotic American repertoire on a par with "America the Beautiful" and "Yankee Doodle". For example, Chief Justice William Rehnquist regularly included "Dixie" in his annual sing-along for the 4th Circuit Judicial Conference in Virginia. However, its performance prompted some African American lawyers to avoid the event.

Campaigns against "Dixie" and other Confederate symbols have been experienced by some working-class white Southerners as contributing to a sense of political ostracism and marginalization. Confederate heritage groups and literature proliferated in the late 1980s and early 1990s in response to criticism of the song. Journalist Clint Johnson calls modern opposition to "Dixie" "an open, not-at-all-secret conspiracy" and an example of political correctness. Johnson believes that modern versions of the song are not racist and simply reinforce that the South "extols family and tradition". Other supporters, such as former State Senator Glenn McConnell of South Carolina, have called the attempts to suppress the song cultural genocide.

In 2016, the Ole Miss athletics department announced the song would no longer be played at athletic events – a tradition that had spanned some seven decades at football games and other sporting events. Ole Miss athletic director at the time Ross Bjork said, "It fits in with where the university has gone in terms of making sure we follow our creed, core values of the athletic department, and that all people feel welcome."

=== In popular culture ===
The song added a new idiom to the American lexicon, whistling Dixie, meaning "to "engage in unrealistically rosy fantasizing". An example provided by The American Heritage Dictionary of the English Language is, "If you think mass transportation is going to replace the automobile I think you're whistling Dixie."

"Dixie" is sampled in the film scores of a great many American feature films, often to signify Confederate troops and the American Civil War. For example, Max Steiner quotes the song in the opening scene of his late 1930s score to Gone with the Wind as a down-beat nostalgic instrumental to set the scene and Ken Burns makes use of instrumental versions in his 1990 documentary The Civil War. In 1943, Bing Crosby's film Dixie (a biopic of Dan Emmett) features the song and it formed the centerpiece of the finale. Crosby never recorded the song commercially.

The soundtracks of cartoons featuring Southern characters like Foghorn Leghorn often play "Dixie" to quickly set the scene. On the television series The Dukes of Hazzard, which takes place in a fictional county in Georgia, the musical car horn of the "General Lee" plays the initial twelve notes of the melody from the song. Sacks and Sacks argue that such apparently innocent associations only further serve to tie "Dixie" to its blackface origins, as these comedic programs are, like the minstrel show, "inelegant, parodic [and] dialect-ridden". On the other hand, Poole sees the "Dixie" car horn as another example of the song's role as a symbol of "working-class revolt".

Performers who choose to sing "Dixie" today usually remove the black dialect and combine the song with other pieces. For example, René Marie's jazz version mixes "Dixie" with "Strange Fruit", a Billie Holiday song about a lynching. Mickey Newbury's "An American Trilogy" (often performed by Elvis Presley) combines "Dixie" with the Union's "Battle Hymn of the Republic" and the negro spiritual "All My Trials".

For many white Southerners, "Dixie," like the Confederate flag, is a symbol of Southern heritage and identity. Until somewhat recently, a few Southern universities including the University of Mississippi maintained the "Dixie" fight song, coupled with the Rebel mascot and the Confederate battle flag school symbol, which led to protests. Confederate heritage websites regularly feature the song, and Confederate heritage groups routinely sing "Dixie" at their gatherings. In his song "Dixie on My Mind," country musician Hank Williams Jr. cites the absence of "Dixie" on Northern radio stations as an example of how Northern culture pales in comparison to its Southern counterpart.

During 2021, the Union army's parody of the song resurged in popularity as it became the anthem of an internet phenomenon known as "Sherman posting", where it was used to disparage Neo-Confederates in internet memes evoking nostalgia for the Union.

The song is referred to in the short story "The Appropriation of Cultures" by Percival Everett in the collection Damned If I Do (2004). The main character, a Black man who regularly plays jazz in a club, is asked by white young men to play Dixie. He accepts and manages to reappropriate the song and its meaning which launches him on a quest to reclaim symbols of the confederate South as symbols of Black pride.

== See also ==
- "Battle Hymn of the Republic", the Union equivalent
- "God Save the South"
