= I'm Going Home to Dixie =

Song by Dan Emmett

"I'm Going Home to Dixie" is an American walkaround, a type of dance song. It was written by Dan Emmett in 1861 as a sequel to the immensely popular walkaround "Dixie". The sheet music was first published that same year by Firth, Pond & Company in an arrangement by C. S. Grafully. Despite the publisher's claim that "I'm Going Home to Dixie" had been "Sung with tumultuous applause by the popular Bryant's Minstrels", the song lacked the charm of its predecessor, and it quickly faded into obscurity. The song's lyrics follow the minstrel show scenario of the freed slave longing to return to his master in the South; it was the last time Emmett would use the term "Dixie" in a song. Its tune simply repeated Emmett's earlier walkaround "I Ain't Got Time to Tarry" from 1858.

Emmett dedicated "I'm Going Home to Dixie" to P. P. Werlein, Esq., a publisher who had disputed Emmett's copyright to "Dixie" by printing it in New Orleans without attribution. The sheet music also included a note as to the true location of "Dixie":

As many inquiries have been made in regard to the meaning of "Dixies Land" and as to the location, it may be well to remark, that with the southern negroes, Dixies Land is but another name for Home. Hence it is but fair to conclude, that all south of the Mason's & Dixon's Line is the true "Dixies Land."
