= I Ain't Got Time to Tarry =

Song by Dan Emmett

"I Ain't Got Time to Tarry", also known as "The Land of Freedom", is an American song written by blackface minstrel composer Dan Emmett. It premiered in a minstrel show performance by Bryant's Minstrels in late November 1858. The song was published in New York City in 1859.

The lyrics tell of a black man in the Northern United States who is homesick for the South. He decides to return to the South, as illustrated in the chorus:

For I'se gwine home to Dinah,
Yes, I am gwine home.
Den I ain't got time to tarry, I ain't got time to dwell,
I'm bound to de land of freedom, oh, niggars! fare you well.

The pining ex-slave scenario was a common idiom of blackface minstrelsy during the 1850s. Emmett would repeat it in other songs, including "Johnny Roach" and "Dixie".

Emmett's later "I'm Going Home to Dixie" reuses the tune to "I Ain't Got Time to Tarry".
