= Warren Harris (serial killer) =

American serial killer

- Born: Warren Harris, Jr. 1960 (age 65–66); New Orleans, Louisiana, U.S.
- Other name: "The French Quarter Stabber"
- Status: Paroled in 2024
- Conviction: First degree murder (3 counts)
- Penalty: 3 life sentences without possibility of parole; commuted to life with parole

Details
- Victims: 4 (3 convictions)
- Span of crimes: February 14 – April 7, 1977
- Country: United States
- State: Louisiana
- Date apprehended: April 13, 1977

Warren Harris Jr. (born 1960), known as The French Quarter Stabber, is an American serial killer who fatally stabbed four people, three of whom were gay men, in New Orleans' French Quarter from February to April 1977. Convicted for three of the murders, he was given three consecutive life terms without parole, which he served in Louisiana State Penitentiary. Due to his young age at the time of his crimes, in 2021 he was made eligible for parole, and in 2024 he was officially paroled from prison.

== Early life ==
Little is known about Harris' upbringing. Born in New Orleans in 1961, he was presumably raised by his mother and his maternal grandfather, who was a well-respected Baptist minister in the city. From an early age, Harris started committing small-time crimes like purse snatching and thefts, and was incarcerated in 1974 for auto theft. Despite his criminal record, he was not considered a violent individual, and after dropping out of the eight grade, he moved in with a transsexual roommate in an apartment within the French Quarter.

== Murders ==
From February 14 to April 7, 1977, a total of five men were stabbed to death in New Orleans' French Quarter, all within a 20-block radius and near strip clubs or jazz parlors. Most of the victims shared many similarities: a majority of them were middle-aged, gay men who frequented the homosexual establishments in the French Quarter; all five had been stabbed to death; four of them were found slain in their own residences, and three had apparently died shortly after having sex. Due to the fact that most of the victims were known to be gay, this caused a panic within the New Orleans' gay community, which feared that they were being targeted by a single killer. The victims were the following:

- Robert Gary (47) – stabbed to death on Valentine's Day in his apartment at 622 Dumaine Street.
- James McClure (32) – stabbed to death at a vacant lot behind a gas station at Esplanade Avenue and North Rampart Street on March 2.
- Jack Savell (38) – stabbed to death in his apartment at 820 Esplanade Avenue on March 21. Worked at Werlein's for Music, and was reportedly acquainted with Delano.
- Alden D. Delano (59) – stabbed to death at his apartment at 1421 Royal on April 1. Worked at Werlein's for Music, and was reportedly acquainted with Savell.
- Ernest Pommier (77) – stabbed 50 times at his ground-floor apartment on Esplanade Avenue on April 7. The oldest known victim, Pommier's killing significantly differed from others: he was not known to be gay and his body was in a kneeling position, sans any shirt and underwear.

== Arrest, trial, and imprisonment ==
On April 13, Harris was arrested after attempting to rob and stab a French seaman, whereupon he was immediately lodged in the county jail. During interviews with detectives, he revealed that he had a so-called "revulsion" towards homosexuals, and subsequently confessed to four of the murders that had occurred within the last two months. Due to this, he was subsequently charged with the murders of Gary, Savell, Delano, and Pommier. McClure's killing was determined to be unrelated to the crimes.

In the aftermath of his arrest, Harris' mother and grandfather were called to accompany him to interrogations, where they stated their belief that while Harris might have participated in the crimes, they believed that somebody else was the actual killer. Not long after, Harris was charged with four counts of murder, and a motion to throw out his confessions was dismissed after it was determined that he had lied about interrogators threatening to kill him if he did not sign the typewritten confession. In an attempt to delay the trial and argue against a likely death sentence, his attorneys filed a motion challenging it at one hearing.

The motion was eventually brought before the Orleans Parish Criminal District Court, which ruled 4–3 in Harris' favor and ordered that separate trials should be held. In response, District Attorney Harry Connick announced that he would challenge the decision before the Louisiana Supreme Court.

The decision was eventually overturned, and Harris' trial began in October 1977. After less than a month, he was found guilty on three counts of first degree murder. Prosecutors sought a death sentence. However, Harris's lawyer argued that his youth and mental records, which describing him as "borderline mentally retarded", warranted mercy. He noted that under state law, Harris's victims would be guilty of statutory rape. In his confession, Harris also claimed that Ernest Pemmier, the sole victim with his clothes still on, attempted to rape him. With this in mind, the jury voted for life in prison. Harris received three consecutive life terms without the chance of pardon or parole.

Harris was resentenced to life with parole in 2021. On April 17, 2024, the Louisiana Parole Board granted Harris parole. As per his parole conditions, he will remain under supervision for the rest of his life.

== See also ==
- List of youngest killers
- List of serial killers in the United States
