= Clare de Kitchen =

American song from the blackface minstrel tradition

"Clare de Kitchen" is an American song from the blackface minstrel tradition. It dates to 1832, when blackface performers such as George Nichols, Thomas D. Rice, and George Washington Dixon began to sing it. These performers and American writers such as T. Allston Brown traced the song's origins to black riverboatmen. "Clare de Kitchen" became very popular, and performers sometimes sang the lyrics of "Blue Tail Fly" to its tune.

Musicologist Dale Cockrell sees echoes of European mumming traditions in "Clare de Kitchen". In traditional mumming plays, the participants first entered a private household. One mummer, usually with a broom and sometimes with blackened face, would then clear an area and declare the space to now be public, for the use of the players. "Clare de Kitchen", Cockrell argues, moves this public/private space to the theatre. The first verse reflects this relationship to mumming:

In old Kentuck in de arternoon,
We sweep de floor wid a bran new broom,
And dis de song dat we do sing,
Oh! Clare de kitchen old folks young folks
Clare de kitchen old folks young folks
Old Virginny never tire.

The line "I wish I was back in old Kentuck" is one of the earliest examples of "I wish I was in" from blackface minstrelsy. This line eventually became the famous "I Wish I Was in Dixie" in 1859.

An alternate set of lyrics, sung by Thomas D. Rice in the mid-1830s, may reflect the input or influence of American blacks. This version features animal characters and trickster figures triumphing over larger animals in the same way that such figures do in African folktales:

A jay bird sot on a hickory limb,
He wink'd at me and I wink'd at him,
I pick'd up a stone and I hit his shin,
Says he you better not do dat agin.

A Bull frog dress'd sogers close,
Went in de field to shoot some crows;
De crows smell powder and fly away,
De Bull frog mighty mad dat day.
