= I'm Gwine ober de Mountain =

American minstrel song

"I'm Gwine ober de Mountain", also spelled "I'm Going ober de Mountain", is an American song written by the blackface minstrel composer Dan Emmett. The song may be a precursor to "Dixie", as evidenced by its line "Away down south in de Kentuck brake"; in comparison, "Dixie" includes the line, "Away down south in Dixie". The first phrase of "I'm Gwine ober de Mountain" was probably modeled after "The Spinning Wheel", an older English song.
