= De Wild Goose-Nation =

1840s song

Song
- Composer(s): Dan Emmett

"De Wild Goose-Nation" is an American song composed by blackface minstrel performer Dan Emmett.

The song is a parody (or possibly an adaptation) of "Gumbo Chaff", a blackface minstrel song dating to the 1830s, the music of which most closely resembles an 1844 version of that song. Musicologist Hans Nathan sees similarities in the introduction of the song to the later "Dixie".

Animal characters are the song's protagonists, tying "De Wild Goose-Nation" to similar tales in African American folklore. Despite the title, the phrase "wild goose nation" occurs only once, in the first verse. Some lyrics from the song are repeated in "Dixie": "De tarapin he thot it was time for to trabble / He screw aron his tail and begin to scratch grabble."

Emmett published the song through the Charles Keith Company in Boston in 1844. The title page claimed that the song had been sung "with unprecedented success . . . both in Europe and America"; nevertheless, analysis of playbills and newspaper clippings suggests that it saw only moderate popularity. Emmett dedicated the song to "'Jim Crow' Rice".
