= Jamming (dance) =

Jamming in dance culture is a kind of informal show-off during a social dance party. Dancers clear a circle (jam circle or dance circle) and dancers or dance couples take turns showing their best tricks while the remaining dancers cheer the jammers on. While some jam circles are staged, most form organically and spontaneously when the energy and mood is right.

== Jam circles ==
The term originated during the swing era of dancing, probably borrowed or appeared in parallel with the expression "jam session" in music. Scenes with jamming may be seen in movies and musicals, such as Hellzapoppin. At the same time, this type of dance behavior is common in folk dances in various cultures worldwide and is often featured in performances where group dances are combined with several solos. In Lindy hop, it is common for jam circles to take place on or around special occasions such as birthdays or weddings. In these cases, the person(s) being celebrated will usually stay in the circle for the duration of the jam and, rather than dance one song with one partner, will dance one song but swap partners many times throughout.

== Dance off ==
This form of jamming often occurs during prom, high school or college dance parties. What happens is that during the dances, the dancers would form a circle, and often, one by one, the dancers, individually or by a group, would come into the circle and display their dancing abilities. The style of dancing is popular amongst hip hop dancers.

== See also ==
- Roda (dancing)
- Walkaround
