= P. P. Werlein =

American music publisher (1812–1885)

Philip Peter Werlein
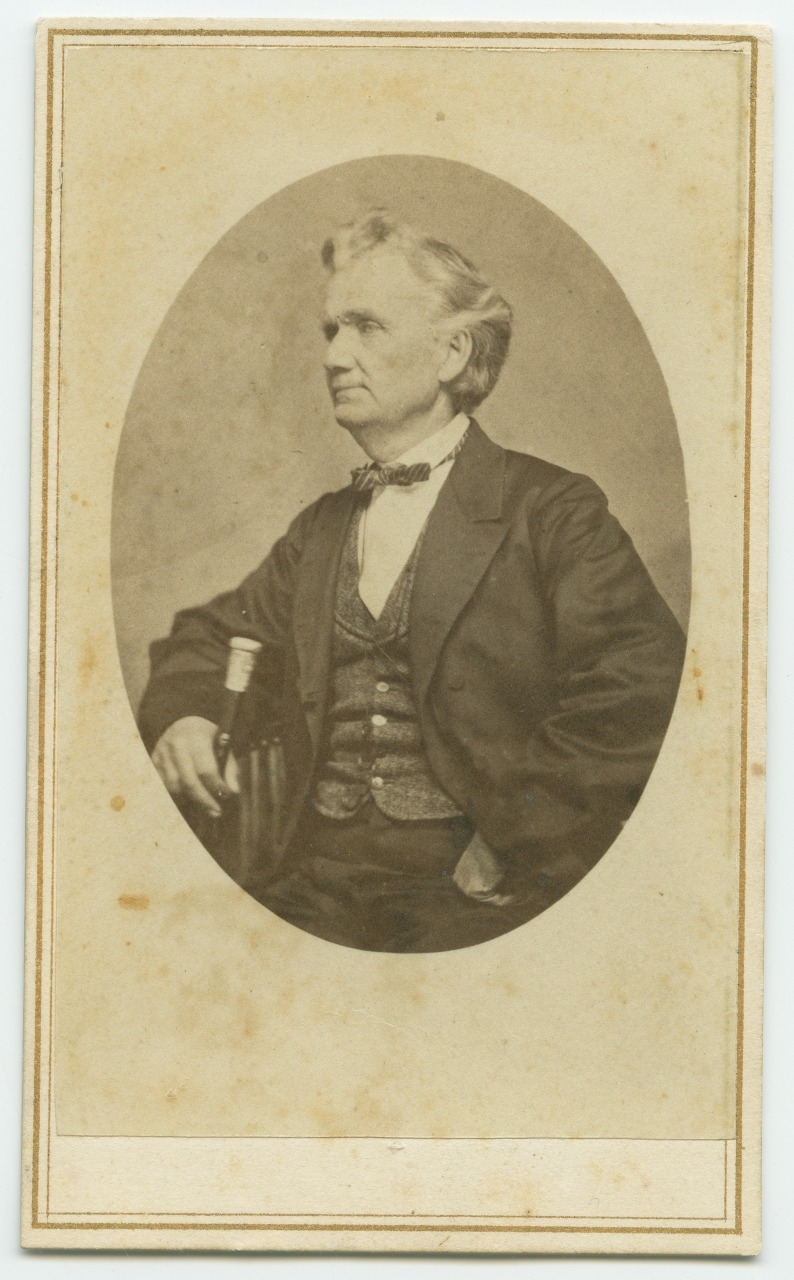
- Portrait of Philip Werlein, circa 1874 (image from The Historic New Orleans Collection)
- Born: March 30, 1812; Rheinkreis, Bavaria
- Died: April 17, 1885 (aged 73); New Orleans, Louisiana, USA
- Occupations: Music retailer Music publisher
- Known for: Publication of notable Civil War Songs; Founded long-standing music stores in the New Orleans Metropolitan Area
- Spouse: Margaret Werlein (née Halsey)

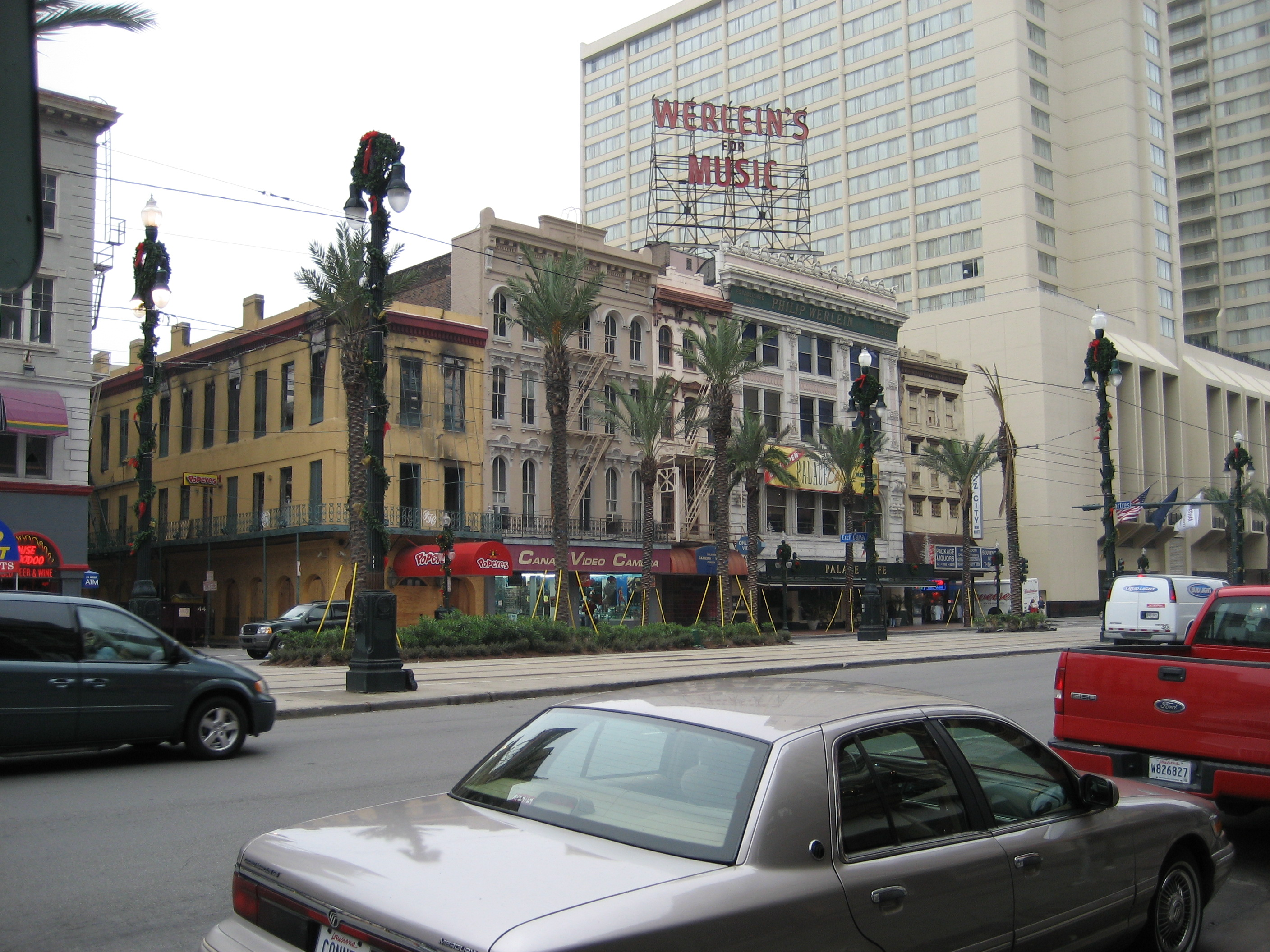
The former flagship Werlein Music Building in New Orleans subsequently housed a restaurant; the "Werlein's For Music" sign on top of the building remained, although it was replaced by the restaurant's name prior to August 2014.

P. P. Werlein (1812–1885) was an American music publisher, piano dealer, and musical instrument retailer based in New Orleans, Louisiana in the 19th century. Among other Civil War songs, he published the sheet music for "Dixie". The retail music stores that he founded, Werlein's for Music, were among the largest in the American South during much of the more than 150 year existence of the stores.

== Early life ==
Philip P. Werlein was born in Rhenkreis, Bavaria, on March 30, 1812. He was educated as a musician, specializing in piano, and was partly self-taught and mentored by his father, who was a professor at the University of Bonn.

After immigrating from Germany to the United States in 1831, Philip P. Werlein studied music and subsequently became a music teacher. He headed the music department at the Female Seminary of Clinton, Mississippi. However, music publishing and music sales became his main business when he opened a music store in 1842 in Vicksburg, Mississippi.

== Music business ==
In 1850, Werlein relocated to New Orleans, where he was initially employed by the Ashbrand Music Company. Three years later, he purchased the Ashbrand Music Company, creating the "Ashbrand & Werlein" music store. The store was located at 93 Camp Street in New Orleans. The store name changed to P. P. Werlein the following year. He listed his store address variously as 3 and 5 Camp Street and 172 Canal Street (before the 1894 street address renumbering).

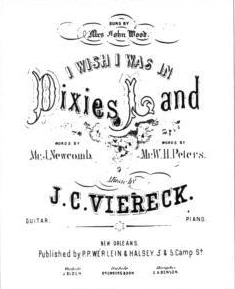
Unauthorized sheet music to "Dixie", published by P. P. Werlein and Halsey of New Orleans, Louisiana in 1861.

Shortly thereafter, Werlein purchased the sheet music catalog and Mayo-Johns music inventory, then owned by William T. Mayo, making Werlein the major music publisher in the American South. Werlein's importance to the music publishing industry became established when the industry association known as the Board of Music Trade granted Werlein membership, making him the only music publisher in the pre-Civil War American South with such recognition.

Like much of the mid-19th century U.S. music industry, Werlein showed little respect for copyright during his career. In 1860, he published unauthorized sheet music for the blackface minstrel hit, "Dixie". Only the threat of legal action convinced Werlein to credit Dan Emmett as the song's writer and to pay royalties to Firth, Pond & Co. Emmett, perhaps sardonically, dedicated the "Dixie" sequel, "I'm Going Home to Dixie", to Werlein in 1861.

Werlein refused to recognize Union copyrights and published new versions of "Dixie", including "The War Song of Dixie" with words by Albert Pike. He also profited from pro-Confederate sentiment by publishing several pieces of music attributed falsely to Jefferson Davis. The Civil War also brought the addition of Werlein's wife's name (Halsey) to the company, which became P. P. Werlein & Halsey in 1861. Nevertheless, the collapse of Confederate money and the seizure of Werlein's inventory of Confederate sheet music with the end of the Civil War put Werlein's stores temporarily out of business.

At the outbreak of the American Civil War, Werlein became a vocal proponent of the Confederacy. After the Union Army took control of New Orleans, Werlein refused to take the Oath of Allegiance required of people in occupied regions of the southern United States. Following his refusal, Werlein went into forced retirement in New Iberia, Louisiana, until the cessation of hostilities in the American Civil War.

P. P. Werlein & Halsey reopened in 1865 and by 1867 relocated to 82 Baronne Street in New Orleans. Philip Werlein's son, also named Philip, became an owner. Many years later, the business passed on to Philip Werlein, Jr.'s son. In 1940, David Franck bought the Werleins' publishing business, although the family kept their retail music store business in New Orleans. Werlein's for Music expanded to become a regional chain of stores, which continued in the Greater New Orleans area until its liquidation in 2003.

In its earliest years, the stores emphasized sales of pianos, selling several major brands and had its own brand of piano. It had a branch in Mobile, Alabama.

== Personal life ==
Philip P. Werlein married Margaret Halsey of Long Island, New York, in 1846. They had four children together: Philip P. Werlein Jr., S. Halsey Werlein, Lillie Werlein Ware, and Mary Werlein. Philip Jr. became an owner and manager of the music store and publishing company at the end of the United States Civil War.

At times, Philip P. Werlein was known as Philip P. Werlein I, while his son, referred to as Philip Werlein Jr. (1847-1899), was known in the local community as Philip Werlein Sr., even though he had the same name as his father. Press reports in the immediate post-Civil War period often did not distinguish between the two, and in fact Philip P. Werlein's grandson was often known as Philip P. Werlein Jr. (1878-1917).

Werlein's wife died three months before his death on April 17, 1885. His cause of death was reported to be apoplexy, which overcame him suddenly and unexpectedly. He is interred in the family tomb at Metairie Cemetery.

== Representative sheet music publications ==
In the mid to late nineteenth century, Werlein's for Music published anthologies of sheet music in its journals, "The Song Journal" and "Werlein's Journal of Music". About a third of the music pieces published by Werlein's for Music during this time period do not bear a date of copyright or publication. This list below is from the Civil War period and the immediate post-war period. A more complete listing of sheet music publications by Werlein's for Music is given in the reference.

- "The Attractive German Polka", published in 1853
- "La Belle Louisianinais", a piano schottische
- "The Young Couple Polka", published in 1853, composed by C. Cook, and arranged for piano
- "President Jefferson Davis Grand March", published in 1861, composed by Mrs. Flora Byrna
- "Dixie", composed by Daniel Decatur Emmett in 1859, published by Werlein in 1861
- "Maryland! My Maryland!" published in 1862
