= Clint Johnson =

American historian

- Born: DeSoto County, Florida
- Occupations: Nonfiction Author; Historian
- Spouse: Barbara
- Writing career
- Period: American Civil War

Clint Johnson (born in Fish Branch, Florida) is an American author of nonfiction, primarily about the American Civil War. He is a graduate of the University of Florida.

Fascinated with the American Civil War since childhood, Johnson has written eight books on the subject. He was also coauthor of They Call Me Big House, ISBN 0-89587-303-6, the autobiography of the late Clarence Gaines, one of America's best collegiate basketball coaches. Johnson is also the author of two corporate biographies, and hundreds of newspaper and magazine articles on business, history and travel.

== Personal ==
Johnson lives in the mountains of North Carolina with his wife Barbara. He has been featured as a guest on The Political Cesspool.

== Bibliography ==
- TIN CANS & GREYHOUNDS: The Destroyers That Won World War II, 2019, Regnery History, ISBN 978-1-62157-647-1
- A VAST AND FIENDISH PLOT: The Confederate Attack on New York City, 2010, Citadel/Kensington Press, ISBN 0-8065-3131-2
- PURSUIT: The Chase, Capture, Persecution and Surprising Release of Confederate President Jefferson Davis, 2008, Citadel/Kensington Publishing, ISBN 978-0-8065-2890-8
- The Politically Incorrect Guide to the South, 2007, Regnery Publishing, ISBN 1-59698-500-3
- Colonial America and the American Revolution: The 25 Best Sites, 2006, Greenline Publications, ISBN 0-9766013-2-X
- The 25 Best Civil War Sites: The Ultimate Traveler's Guide to Battlefields, Monument & Museums, 2005, Greenline Publications, ISBN 0-9759022-4-5
- They Call Me Big House, 2004, John F. Blair Publisher, ISBN 0-89587-303-6
- In the Footsteps of J.E.B. Stuart, 2003, John F. Blair Publisher, ISBN 0-89587-261-7
- Bull's-Eyes and Misfires: 50 Obscure People Whose Efforts Shaped the American Civil War, 2002, Rutledge Hill Press, ISBN 1-55853-961-1
- In the Footsteps of Stonewall Jackson, 2002, John F. Blair Publisher, ISBN 0-89587-244-7
- In the Footsteps of Robert E. Lee, 2001, John F. Blair Publisher, ISBN 0-89587-235-8
- Touring Virginia's and West Virginia's Civil War Sites, 1999, John F. Blair Publisher, ISBN 0-89587-184-X
- Civil War Blunders, 1997, John F. Blair Publisher, ISBN 0-89587-163-7
- Touring the Carolinas' Civil War Sites, 1996, John F. Blair Publisher, ISBN 0-89587-146-7
