= WDAB =

Radio station in Travelers Rest–Greenville, South Carolina (1964–2018)

Travelers Rest, South Carolina; United States
- Broadcast area: Upstate South Carolina
- Frequency: 1580 kHz

Ownership
- Owner: Dabney-Adamson Broadcasting, Inc.

History
- First air date: October 12, 1964
- Last air date: April 3, 2018
- Former call signs: WBBR (1964–1992)
- Call sign meaning: Dabney-Adamson Broadcasting (owner 1993–2018)

Technical information
- Facility ID: 15237
- Class: D
- Power: 5,000 Watts (day); 1,000 Watts (critical hours); 10 Watts (night)
- Transmitter coordinates: 34°56′55.00″N 82°26′38.00″W

WDAB was a Class D AM radio station located in Travelers Rest, South Carolina, near Greenville. The station was licensed by the Federal Communications Commission (FCC) to broadcast on 1580 kHz with a transmitter power of 5,000 watts during the day, 1,000 watts during critical hours and 10 watts at night.

== History ==
=== WBBR ===
The station began broadcasting on October 12, 1964, under the call letters WBBR. The station was owned by the Piedmont Broadcasting Company, a venture of William H. Kirby and John B. Burns, and aired a country music format from studios on Old Buncombe Road. It initially broadcast with 500 watts during the daytime only, but in 1967, WBBR was authorized to increase to 1,000 watts. Kirby then bought out Burns's stake in the company in 1970.

Over the course of the 1970s, the station slowly shifted from a country format to southern gospel music, making the switch official in early 1975; after a year, owner Kirby trumpeted that the station had tripled its audience from the change in repertoire. However, the station returned in part to a country format in 1977 when it hired Rick Driver, who had been a country DJ for WFBC in Greenville, and began airing country music from 6 a.m. to 10:30 a.m.

The FCC granted WBBR a construction permit to increase its power further, to 5,000 watts, and begin broadcasting during critical hours with 1,000 watts on July 30, 1979. When the increase became effective in 1980, the station ditched its musical programming, which had reverted to all-country, and instituted a religious format with the name "That Certain Sound". Kirby died in 1988.

=== WDAB ===
In 1992, WBBR changed its call letters to WDAB; the next year, it was sold to the namesake of said call letters, Dabney-Adamson Broadcasting, for $180,000. The reason the station changed call letters before it was sold was because the Kirby family had sold the WBBR call letters separately, to Michael Bloomberg, for use on his new business radio station in New York. Dabney-Adamson dropped the long-running religious programming for a news/talk format based on the audio of CNN Headline News, as well as weekend sports and cultural shows.

The station ended up changing to an adult standards format by early 1998. That February, a weekly radio show debuted, one that would change the course of much of the rest of WDAB's history: "La Brava", a five-hour weekly block in Spanish with music and talk programs. The show quickly grew to 12 hours on Saturdays and six on Sundays, and the station was airing Spanish-language programming daily beginning in late June. In April 1999, the entire station was leased out to José Belén Robles, who owned several Hispanic food stores in the area. The founder of WDAB's original Spanish-language programming, Carlos García, soon left to convert WGVL (1440 AM) into a competing full-service outlet.

On January 27, 2007, what had been "La Poderosa" flipped from a secular format to religious programming after operator Belén Robles affiliated the station with the Atlanta-based Cadena Radial de Vida, directed by pastor Julián Herrera. After just six months, the station returned to its Regional Mexican music.

After nearly two decades as a Spanish-language station, a new lessee took over WDAB in 2016 and returned it to its roots as a local station serving Travelers Rest, run by Dan Scott, the voice of Furman University athletics; the station also was slated to carry 40 Furman baseball games, when in prior years only six aired on the radio. The new format would not last. WDAB went off the air for good on April 3, 2018; on November 8, 2019, the FCC canceled the station's license, for being silent more than a year.
