= Gumbo Chaff =

American song

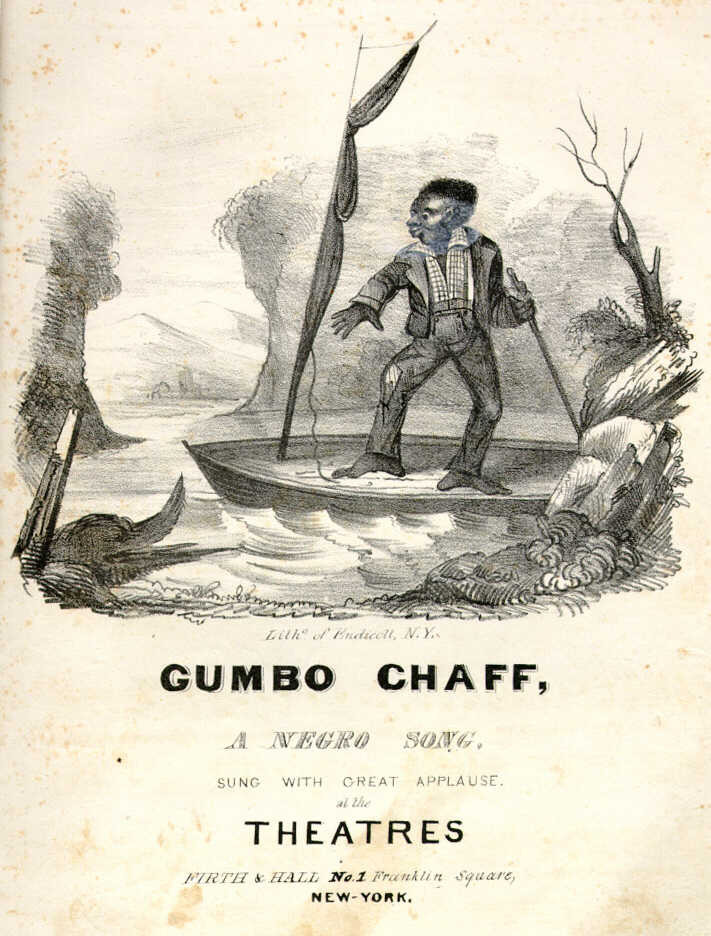
"Gumbo Chaff" sheet music cover, Firth & Pond, New York

"Gumbo Chaff", also spelled "Gombo Chaff", is an American song, first performed in the early 1830s. It was part of the repertoire of early blackface performers, including Thomas D. Rice and George Washington Dixon.

The title character was one of the earliest blackface characters in the United States. He was based largely on the tall-tale riverboatsmen and frontiersmen characters that were popular in fiction during the Jacksonian Era. "Gumbo Chaff" merged these frontier elements with stereotypes of black slaves, creating a new character who lives "On de Ohio bluff in de state of Indiana" and who "jump into [his] kiff / And . . . down de river driff, / And . . . cotch as many cat fish as ever nigger liff." Due to this song's popularity, the black riverboatsman (usually named "Gumbo Chaff") became a popular character in minstrelsy for a time. Blackface singers would often perform "Gumbo Chaff" with a mock flatboat on stage.

The song's melody seems to be at least partially based on an older English song called "Bow Wow Wow". "De Wild Goose-Nation", a blackface song written by Dan Emmett in 1844, adapted the tune to "Gumbo Chaff", possibly with parodic intent.
