= Werlein's for Music =

Defunct American music store and publisher

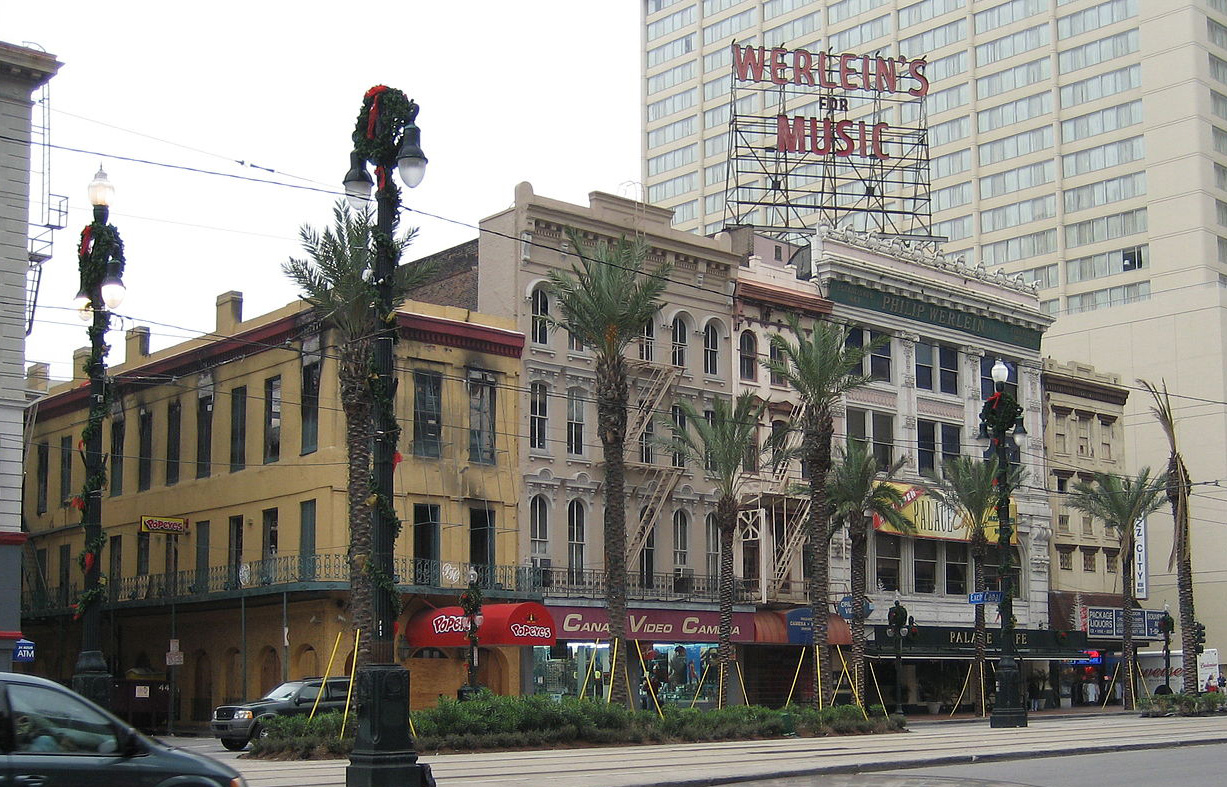
- Werlein's for Music on Canal Street in New Orleans after its closure
- Trade name: Werlein's; Werlein's for Music
- Company type: Retail; Privately held
- Industry: Music store Sheet music publisher
- Predecessor: Ashbrand Music Company
- Founded: 1854 by some accounts in 1842
- Founders: Philip P. Werlein
- Defunct: March 26, 2003
- Fate: Liquidation
- Headquarters: 605 Canal Street; New Orleans, Louisiana
- Areas served: New Orleans metropolitan area

Werlein's for Music is a defunct music store and sheet music publishing company that served the New Orleans Metropolitan Area, and elsewhere in Louisiana and Mississippi, for approximately 150 years.

At its peak, Werlein's for Music had satellite stores in Baton Rouge, Louisiana, Shreveport, Louisiana, Biloxi, Mississippi, and Jackson, Mississippi, with fourteen stores in total. For the majority of the firm's existence, its flagship store was at 605 Canal Street in New Orleans. In its last few years, the flagship store was on Veterans Highway in suburban Jefferson Parish.

Through its history, its sales slogan was "Everything Musical", consistent with Werlein's for Music's intent of providing a one stop shopping experience for musicians and those interested in music.

== Founding ==
In 1854, Philip Werlein entered the music retailing business in New Orleans, having purchased the New Orleans music business that belonged to L.C. Ashbrand. Werlein was an immigrant from Germany with a musical background who had previously settled in Vicksburg, Mississippi. In Vicksburg, Werlein was a music teacher who opened a music store there in 1842. For this reason, the founding of Werlein's for Music could be counted as 1842, rather than 1852 or 1854.

After New Orleans was captured by the Union Army during the United States Civil War, business leaders and other prominent people in New Orleans were expected to sign an oath of allegiance to the United States. Werlein refused to do so and instead entered forced retirement in New Iberia, Louisiana. During that time, store employees hid away pianos. When hostilities ended, the hidden pianos provided inventory for the store so that it could quickly reopen, once again in New Orleans.

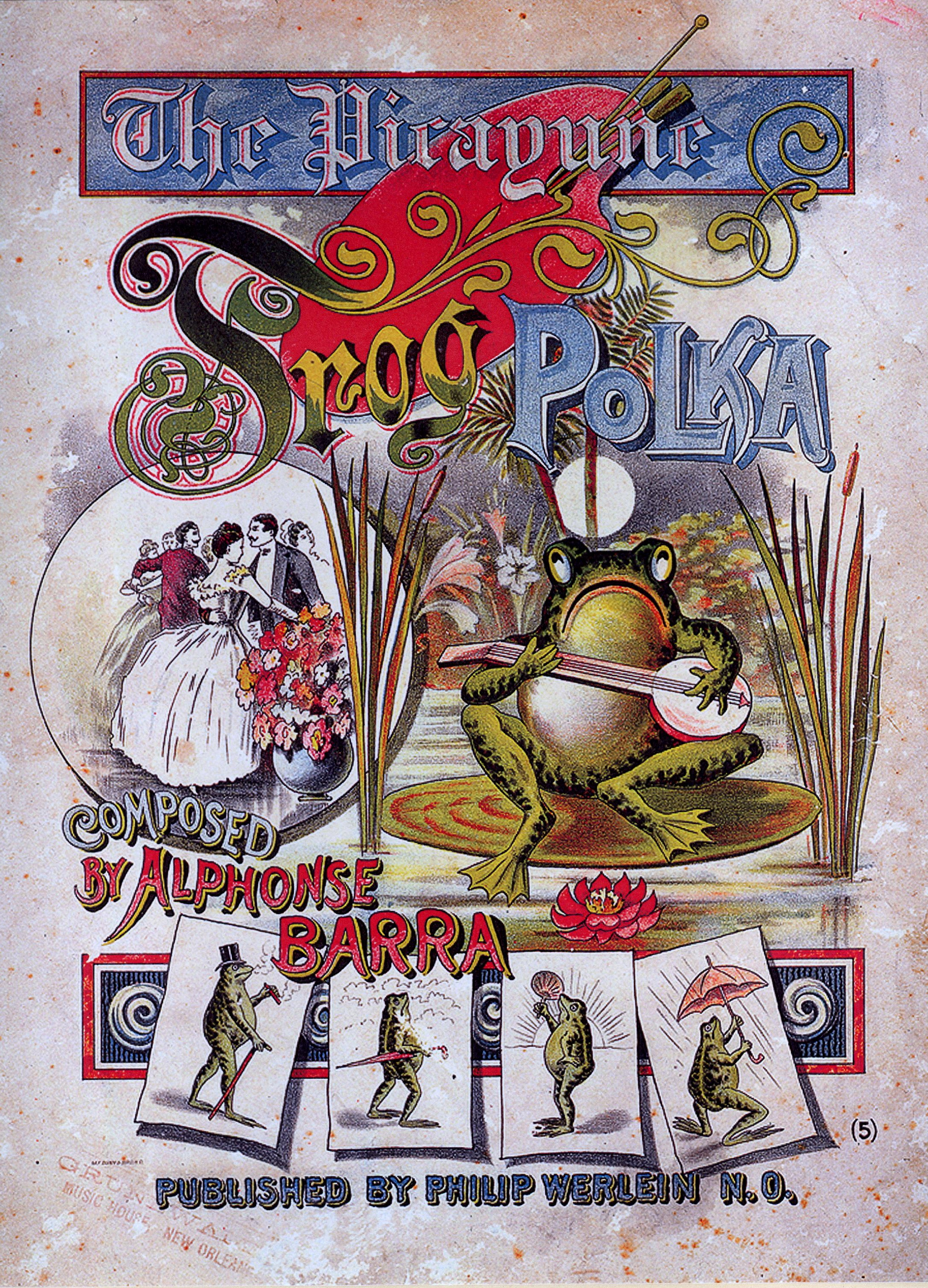
Sheet music cover using the name of Philip Werlein as the publisher

Following his return from New Iberia after the United States Civil War, Philip P. Werlein, Jr., joined his father in managing Werlein's for Music, eventually becoming the dominant partner. During the period of time shortly after the United States Civil War, many press reports about the business's activities did not distinguish between Philip P. Werlein and Philip P. Werlein, Jr.

In its early history, Werlein's for Music moved between various addresses in the New Orleans Central Business District, including Camp Street and Baronne Street before locating to a four-story building at 605 Canal Street, where the store remained for almost all of the twentieth century. The name of the store also changed several times, particularly in its early history, with names including: P. P. Werlein & Halsey, Werlein Piano Company of New Orleans, Ashbrand & Werlein, Philip Werlein Ltd., House of Werlein, and P. P. Werlein & Shepherd, all before finally settling on Werlein's for Music. This remained the name of the stores for the majority of their history.

== Business practices ==
Through the years of the firm's existence, its management passed through generations of the original founder's descendants. Philip Werlein, Jr., managed Werlein's for Music until 1899 at which time Philip Werlein III became the general manager, serving in that capacity until 1917. Management and ownership of Werlein's for Music remained with descendants of Philip Werlein for the duration of its history.

Werlein's for Music provided one stop shopping for musicians' musical needs. Besides a large selection of musical instruments, the store provided repair services for musical instruments, sheet music, and music lessons. The store sold tickets to music events held in the New Orleans Metropolitan Area. It employed a staff of knowledgeable sales personnel. The New Orleans Symphony established offices on the third floor of the Canal Street store. The store maintained an auditorium on its top floor, with performances by Les Paul and Mary Ford, among many other musicians and entertainers.

External media
- Media related to Werlein's for Music

Images
- Werlein's store front on Canal Street, as seen in the early 1930s, courtesy of the Louisiana Endowment for the Humanities
- Advertising for a rock concert in New Orleans with tickets available through Werlein's

Video
- A video history of Werlein's for Music, courtesy of WYES-TV and The Historic New Orleans Collection

In 1880, Werlein's acquired the National Theatre which was an important music venue in New Orleans, although it had fallen into significant disrepair. The theatre was at times known as the "German Theatre", and this may have been part of the appeal of the property to the Werlein family, considering their German heritage. Located at the intersection of Perdido Street and Baronne Street in the New Orleans Central Business District, Werlein's for Music attempted to restore the theatre to its former prestige. The theatre was destroyed by fire in 1887 and so was later sold by Werlein's for Music to real estate developers.

Through much of its history, Werlein's for Music remained visible in the New Orleans Metropolitan Area, through advertising, sponsorship of musical events, assistance to school music programs, and other means. Its slogan "Everything Musical" was used in various contexts for advertising, including a quotation that was frequently repeated to the public through the local time-temperature telephone service:

"Guitars, drums, ukeleles, pianos, everything musical at Werlein's"

== Competition ==
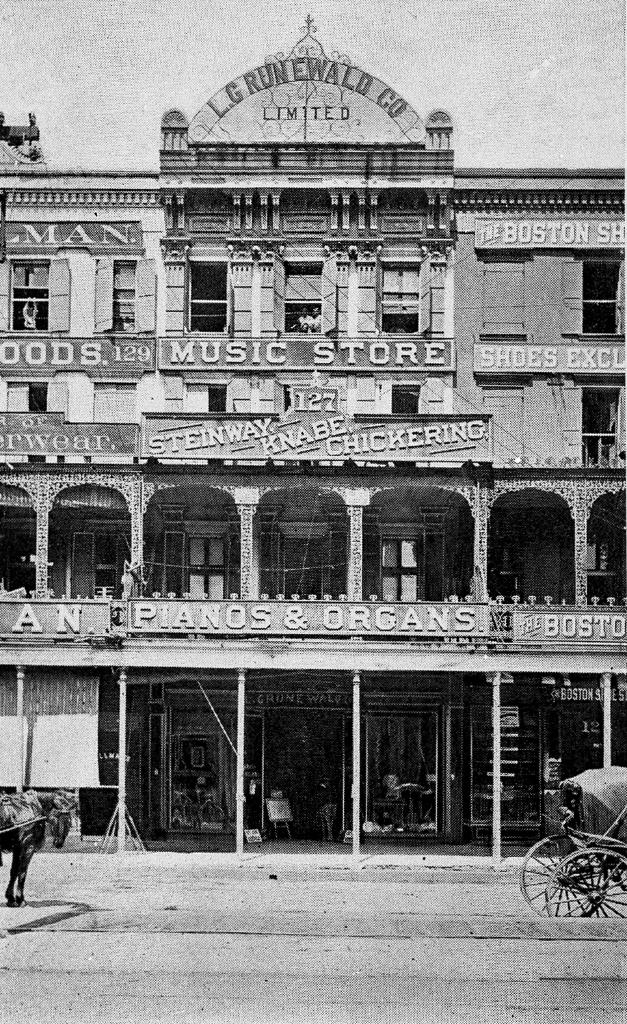
Store front of Grunewald Music Store on Canal Street in New Orleans in 1894

In the late nineteenth century and early twentieth century, New Orleans was a cultural center, especially for the American South. At-home, amateur music performance as a form of home entertainment was prevalent, and so the market for sheet music was large, particularly for piano music and solo voice music. During that time period, New Orleans had several large music retailers and music publishing houses, the most dominant being Werlein's for Music, Grunewald House of Music, and Blackmar.

The Grunewald House Of Music peaked as a retailer between 1900 and 1930. Louis Grunewald entered the music business selling several popular lines of upright and player pianos, and his store also offered pianos under the “L. Grunewald Piano Company” brand name. The name appears to be a private label brand manufactured by the Bradbury Piano Company and also by the Winter Piano Company. Werlein's for Music and Grunewald House of Music were both located on Canal Street nearby each other. Like Werlein's House of Music, Grunewald also had a theatre to serve as a music venue.

In 1858, the brothers Armand Blackmar and Henry Clay Blackmar opened a music store in Vicksburg, Mississippi. In 1860, they relocated their business to New Orleans. Their business included music publishing. Armand Blackmar became a Civil War sympathizer and published much music on behalf of the Confederate cause. This included the piece The Bonnie Blue Flag, which became popular among people in the Confederate States of America. Armand Blackmar was arrested during the United States Civil War by Union General Benjamin Butler, being briefly imprisoned and then fined $500. His inventory was seized by the Union Army. For this reason, much of the Blackmar music business focused on music publishing when it reopened following the end of hostilities. Like Grunewald and Werlein, the Blackmar music business was also located on Canal Street in New Orleans for much of its history. It was reported that Blackmar worked as a clerk at Werlein's for Music for a time during that period, despite being competitors. The Blackmar music business appears to have faded by 1897.

There were also a significant number of minor music publishers and music retailers in New Orleans and the region through the nineteenth century and through the first half of the twentieth century. However, Werlein's for Music was the most enduring of all the New Orleans area firms, including Grunewald and Blackmar.

== Liquidation ==
By the late twentieth century and early twenty-first century, music retailing became increasingly dominated by internet sales, discount stores, and national chain music retailers. This new type of competition doomed Werlein's for Music. The main store on Canal Street closed in the early 1990s. Its last store, which was in suburban Metairie, Louisiana, closed in 2003. These new competitors had buying power that regional firms such as Werlein's for Music could not match.

As of 2010, a remnant of the Werlein's for Music company continued to own the property where the Canal Street store was housed. A tenant included a high end restaurant.

At the time that the last Werlein's for Music store closed in 2003, John Parham Werlein, great-grandson of the founder, was chairman of the board of the firm. At that time, Bitsie Werlein Mouton, great-great-granddaughter of the founder, was president of the firm. In 2003, Werlein's for Music was the oldest retailer in New Orleans.

Following its liquidation in 2003, the owners donated company scrapbooks to The Historic New Orleans Collection. These scrapbooks emphasized the store's history in the nineteenth century and the first half of the twentieth century.

== Representative sheet music publications ==
In the mid to late nineteenth century, Werlein's for Music published anthologies of sheet music in its journals, "The Song Journal" and "Werlein's Journal of Music". Werlein's for Music published an estimated several hundred pieces of sheet music over the time it was in the publishing business. About a third of the music pieces published by Werlein's for Music during this time period do not bear a date of copyright or publication. This list below is from the Civil War period and the immediate post-war period. A more complete listing of sheet music publications by Werlein's for Music is given in the reference. The same reference reports that Werlein's for Music was the most prolific music publishing firms of the various music publishing firm that existed in New Orleans at the time.

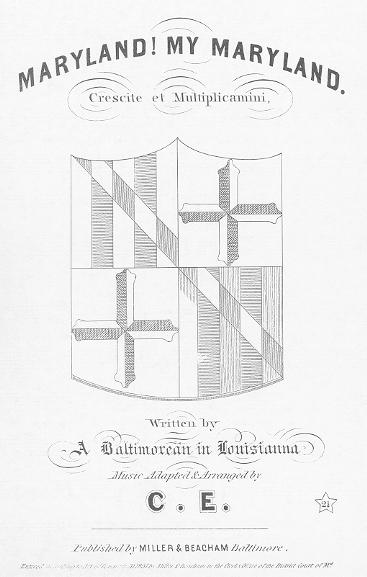
Original cover art of the sheet music for Maryland! My Maryland

- "The Attractive German Polka", published in 1853
- "La Belle Louisianinaise", a piano schottische
- "The Young Couple Polka", published in 1853, composed by C. Cook, and arranged for piano
- "President Jefferson Davis Grand March", published in 1861, composed by Mrs. Flora Byrna
- "Dixie", composed by Daniel Decatur Emmett in 1859, published by Werlein in 1861
- "Maryland! My Maryland", published in 1862
- "Gems of German Song", a pair of ballads published between 1867 and 1877
- "The Louisiana Field Artillery Quickstep (Beanham's Battery)", four-hand piano pieces composed by Morgan G. Kennedy
- "The Thematic List of Songs Suitable for All Occasions", opening measures of songs published by Werlein's for Music during the period 1870 - 1893, divided into various themes
- "Mardi Gras March", published in 1881 and composed by Mrs. Estelle Hayden and dedicated to the Christian Woman's Exchange

== Legacy and influence ==
Through its century and a half existence, Werlein's for Music had significant impact on the musical heritage, culture, and musical skills of New Orleans and its people, through its retail business, music publishing, music lessons, ticket sales, and sponsorship of school bands and local musical events. Several notable professional musicians either had their start with Werlein's for Music or later became patrons of their retail business. Examples include: Fats Domino, Pete Fountain, the Assunto Brothers, Harry Connick Jr., Kid Ory, Buddy Bolden, Peter Bocage, and Van Cliburn.

As owners and managers of Werlein's for Music, the Werlein family was active in the National Association of Music Merchants, an industry trade group. Philip Peter Werlein IV served as president of the organization. His daughter Bitsie Werlein Mouton, while president of Werlein's for Music, was a member of the trade group's board of directors, as was John Parham Werlein, who was the last chairman of the board of Werlein's for Music.

Werlein's for Music appears in the opening scene of John Kennedy Toole's novel A Confederacy of Dunces, where it is patronized by protagonist Ignatius J. Reilly.
