= Walkaround =

Type of dance

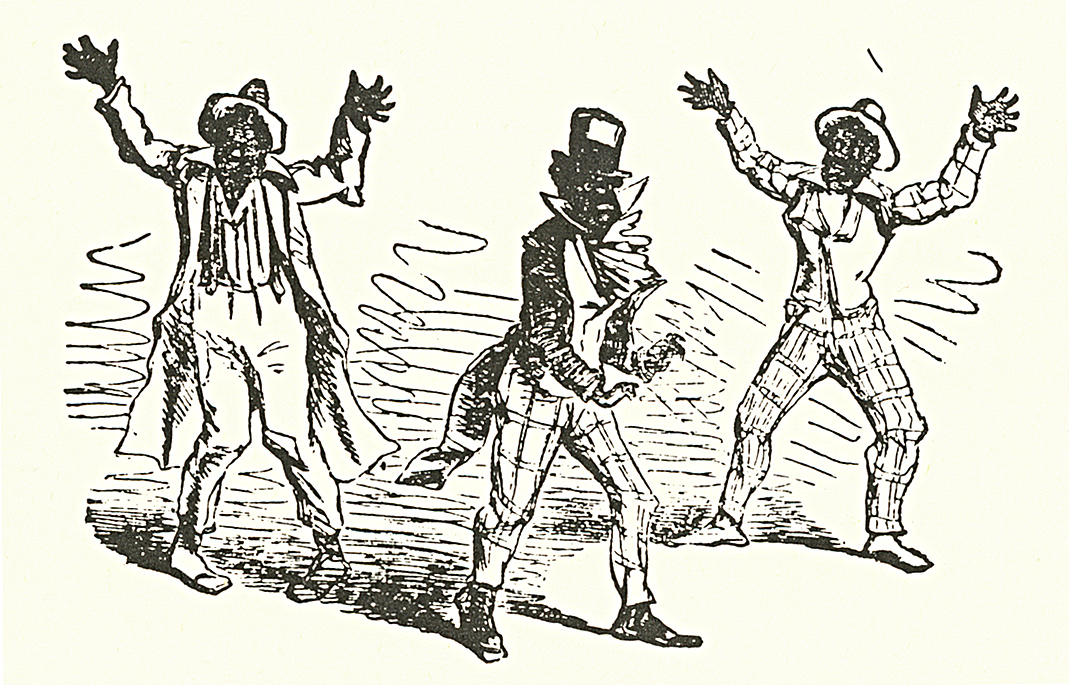
In the first part of the walkaround, a single dancer moved forward and performed while other dancers kept time. Detail from a playbill of the Bryant's Minstrels, 19 December 1859

A walkaround (also spelled walk-around or walk around, or called a horay) was a dance from the blackface minstrel shows of the 19th century. The walkaround began in the 1840s as a dance for one performer, but by the 1850s, many dancers or the entire troupe participated. The walkaround often served as the finale to the first half of the minstrel show, the opening semicircle. Minstrels also wrote songs called "walkarounds", which were specifically intended for this dance; "Dixie" is probably the most famous example.

== Elements of the dance ==
The dance was competitive in nature. At the start of the music, typically a fast dance song in 2/4 or 4/4 time, the dancers (who were already seated in a semicircle) stood and began clapping and slapping themselves in time ("patting Juba"). One dancer or a couple then moved downstage to the focal point of the semicircle and performed a set of elaborate dance steps, lasting for about 16 bars. Once these dancers retreated back to the semicircle, another dancer or pair of dancers took a turn. This repeated until all dancers had soloed. Finally, all the dancers broke ranks and danced the minstrel show into an intermission. Compare with dance jamming.

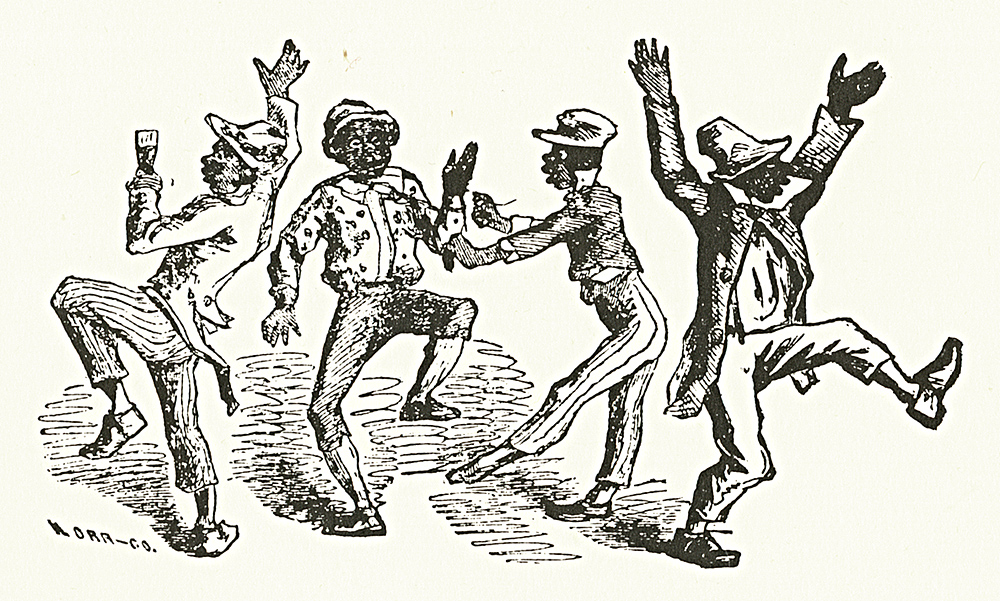
To conclude the walkaround, the semicircle disbanded and the performers danced together. Detail from a playbill of the Bryant's Minstrels, 19 December 1859.

== Origins ==
Nineteenth century commentators claimed that the walkaround descended from the communal dances of African plantation slaves, dances which themselves hearkened back to religious West African dances. Modern scholars still hold this to be mostly true, claiming that the walkaround was a parody of the ring shout, a religious slave dance. The popularity of walkarounds in minstrelsy allowed the style to influence later dances, as well.

In later years, the cakewalk became integrated into the walkaround, and over time the two terms became interchangeable. The cakewalk portion of the dance was typically performed by men in drag.
