= Henry Thompson Stanton =

American poet

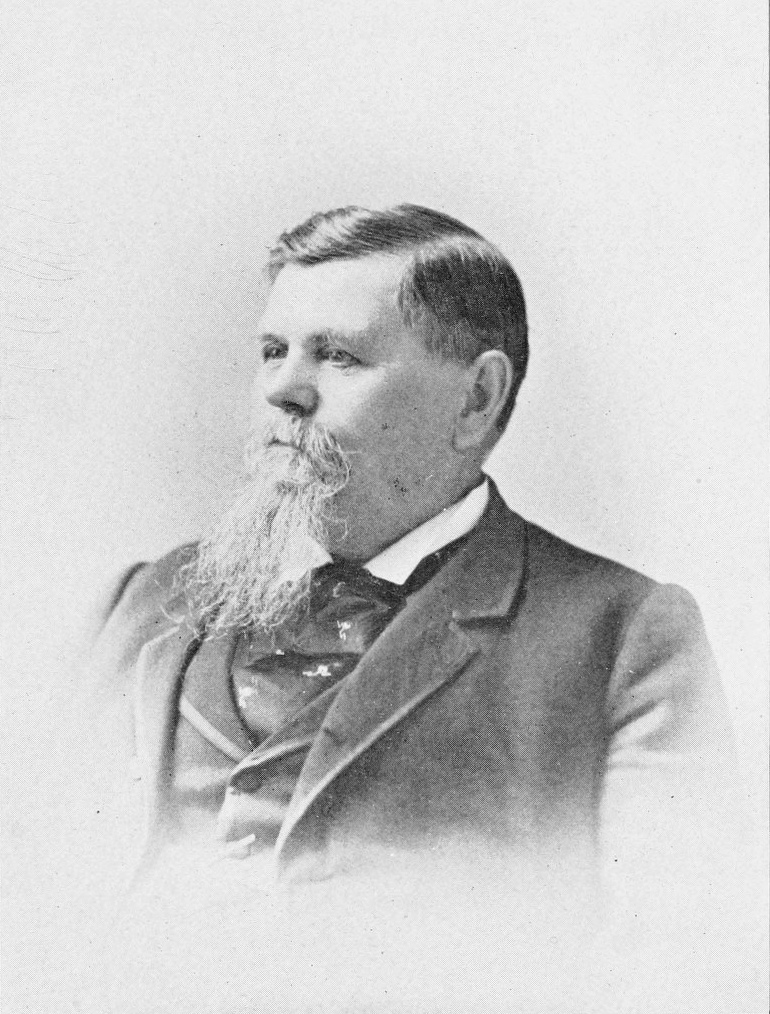
- Born: June 30, 1834; Alexandria, Virginia, U.S.
- Died: May 8, 1898 (aged 63); Frankfort, Kentucky, U.S.
- Other name: Henry Throop Stanton
- Education: United States Military Academy
- Father: Richard H. Stanton

Henry Thompson Stanton (June 30, 1834 – May 8, 1898), also known as Henry Throop Stanton, was an American poet and lawyer, best known for his poem "The Moneyless Man".

== Life ==
Stanton was born in Alexandria, Virginia, on June 30, 1834, to Richard H. Stanton and Asenath Throop. In 1835, Stanton came with parents to Kentucky and was educated at the Maysville Seminary. He attended West Point as a cadet from 1849 to 1851. He later made a living as an editor and as a lawyer. During the American Civil War, Stanton served as an officer of the Confederate States Army. Afterward, he returned to editing.

Stanton died at his home in Frankfort, Kentucky, on May 8, 1898.
