= Johnny Roach =

"Johnny Roach" is an American song written by blackface minstrel composer Dan Emmett. The song was first published in 1859. The lyrics tell of a slave who has escaped to the Northern United States, who laments his lost plantation house and realizes that he really belongs in the South:

To Canada old John was bound
All by de railroad underground;
He's got no clothes—he's got no "tin"
He wishes he was back agin.

The song is notable for being the first printed reference to the South as "Dixie's Land":

Gib me de place called "Dixie's Land,"
Wid hoe and shubble in my hand;
Whar fiddles ring an' banjos play,
I'll dance all night an' work all day.

A portion of the chorus was repeated in "Dixie" with slight variation.
