= Bryant's Minstrels =

19th-century blackface minstrel troupe in New York City

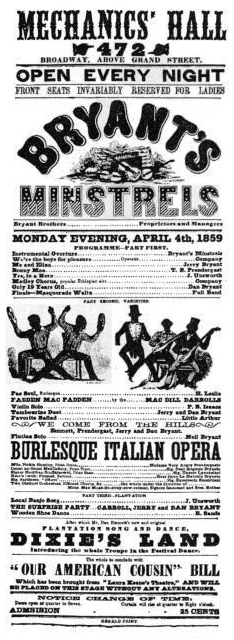
Detail from a playbill for Bryant's Minstrels, Mechanics' Hall, New York, 4 April 1859 (the première of the song "Dixie")

Bryant's Minstrels was a blackface minstrel troupe that performed in the mid-19th century, primarily in New York City. The troupe was led by the O'Neill brothers from upstate New York, who took the stage name Bryant.

== History ==
The eldest brother Jerry, a veteran of the Ethiopian Serenaders, Campbell's Minstrels, E.P. Christy's Minstrels and other troupes, sang and played tambourine and bones. Dan Bryant, who had toured with Losee's Minstrels, the Sable Harmonists and Campbell's Minstrels, sang and played banjo. Neil (Cornelius) Bryant played accordion and flutina. Other members, including English-born fiddler Phil Isaacs, rounded out the original roster. All of the minstrels danced and acted in comedy segments, which were often improvised.

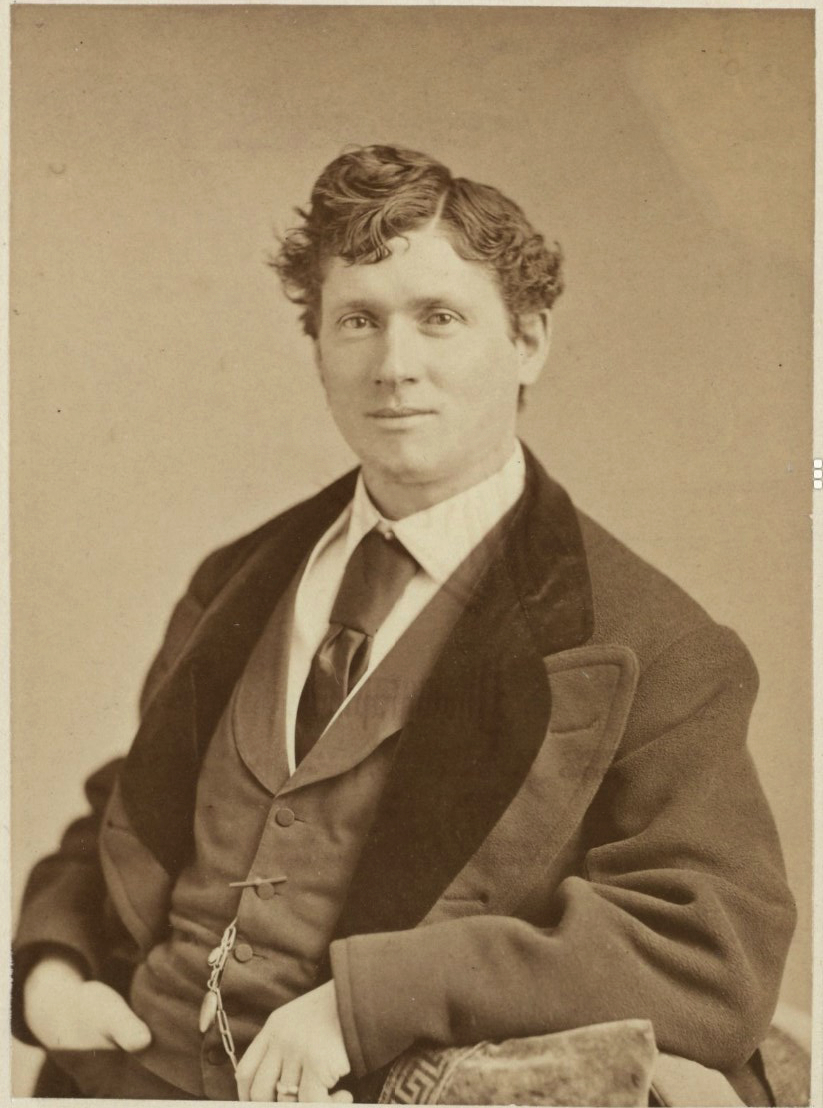
Photo portrait of "Dan Bryant"

Bryant's Minstrels first performed on 23 February 1857 at Mechanics' Hall on Broadway. The Bryants each brought with them the acts and songs they had learned and perfected while playing in other troupes. These older, proven pieces created a nostalgic format of primarily plantation-themed material that seemed to ignore contemporary discussion over abolition. Songs on the bill included Stephen Foster's "Gentle Annie" and the Christy Minstrels' "See, Sir, See" and "Down in Alabama".

The Bryants proved a hit with audiences and critics alike. One reviewer wrote that "it is gratifying to find that we have yet among us those who will not suffer the original type of negro eccentricity to die out altogether. The connecting link . . . are [sic] the Bryant's Minstrels . . . and it is, therefore, to be hoped for that they will continue as they have begun, and stick to the 'old style' entertainment." Over the next few months, they became one of New York's more popular acts. The Clipper wrote on 20 June that "The different bands of Minstrels, in this city, have experienced a wonderful falling off in patronage since the advent among us of the 'Bryants.'" Another review spoke of "a combination of comical talent . . . never before witnessed in Ethiopian Minstrelsy . . . ." Even a nationwide economic downturn in 1858 did not hurt their revenues. The Mechanics' Hall remained their primary venue until May 1866.

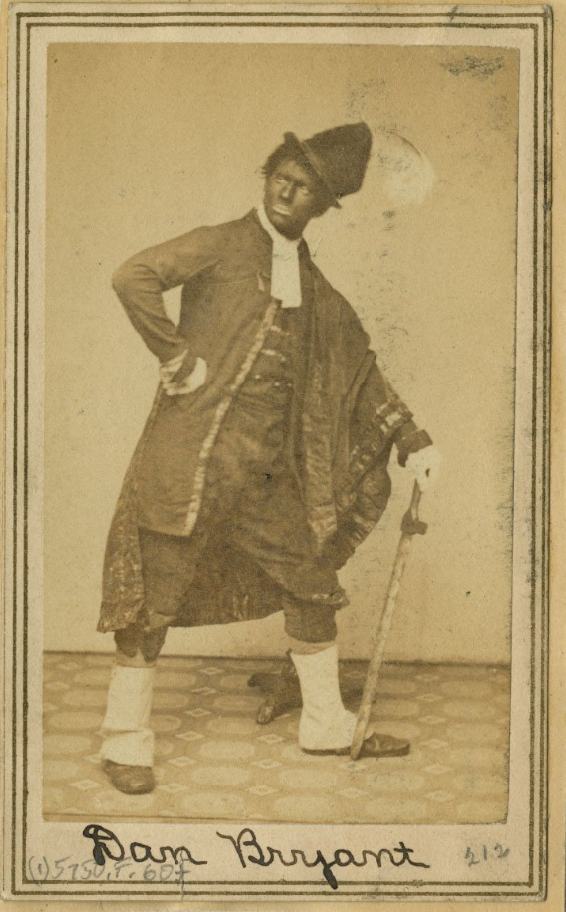
Dan Bryant as a minstrel in blackface.

Over the troupe's life, members came and went. In October or November 1858, Dan Emmett joined as a primary songwriter for what would prove the most prolific period of his career. He also performed fiddle, banjo, drum, fife, and vocals. The song "Dixie", usually attributed to him, was first performed on stage by the Bryants during an 1859 concert. The final act of most minstrel shows of the time were blackface burlesques of mainstream theater, but "Dixie" and songs like it prompted an industry-wide revival of plantation-related material. Emmett's songs proliferated among rival companies. Emmett's influence also helped mature the walkaround from a simple dance to a complete song-and-dance routine.

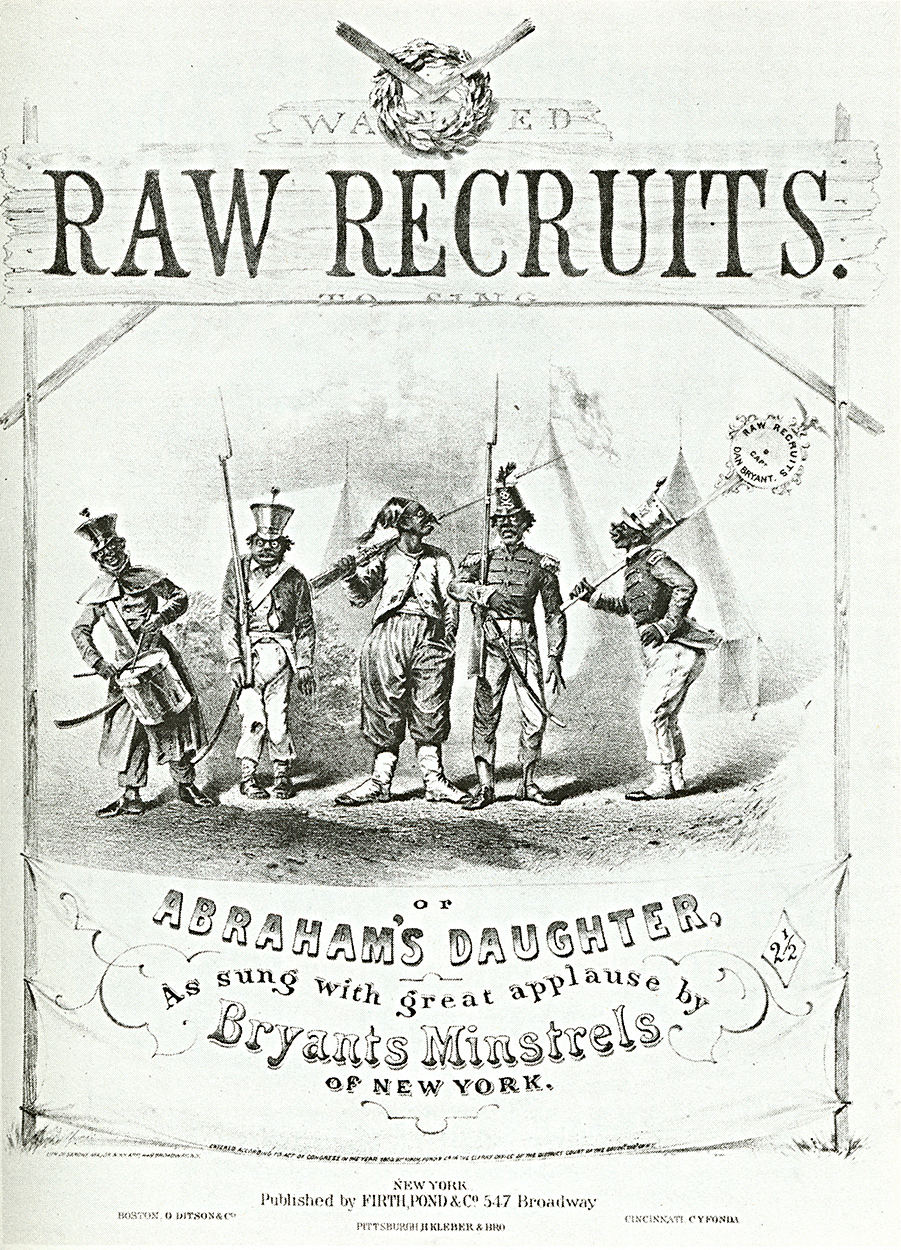
Sheet music cover for "Raw Recruits", a Bryant's song featuring racist stereotypes of black Union soldiers.

Next to Christy's Minstrels, the Bryants were the longest-lasting minstrel troupe to have formed before the Civil War. Jerry Bryant died in 1861, but during the war, Bryant's Minstrels carried on, populating their shows with pro-Union songs such as "One Country and One Flag" and "Raw Recruits", as well as Irish characterizations and songs such as "Finnegan's Wake" and "Lanigan's Ball".

In May 1866, Bryant's Minstrels left Mechanics' Hall, which burned down not long after, to minstrel promoter Charles "Charlie" White and went on a road trip to San Francisco. Dan Emmett left the troupe in July, though he occasionally continued to compose for them. On their return to New York in 1868, the Bryants took over the Olympic Theatre in Tammany Hall on East 14th Street and later moved into their own "Opera House" on 23rd Street.

The late 1860s and 1870s saw minstrel production grow increasingly elaborate and expensive and troupe sizes enlarge. The Bryants stuck with their traditional formula and their popularity waned as a result. Adding the African American dwarf Thomas Dilward to their ranks in the late 1860s (under the stage name "Japanese Tommy") did little to stem the tide.

Dan Bryant died in his New York City home in 1875, but the troupe carried on for seven more years under the management of his surviving brother Neil.
