= Petersen Events Center =

Multi-purpose basketball arena and recreation center at the University of Pittsburgh

- "The Pete"

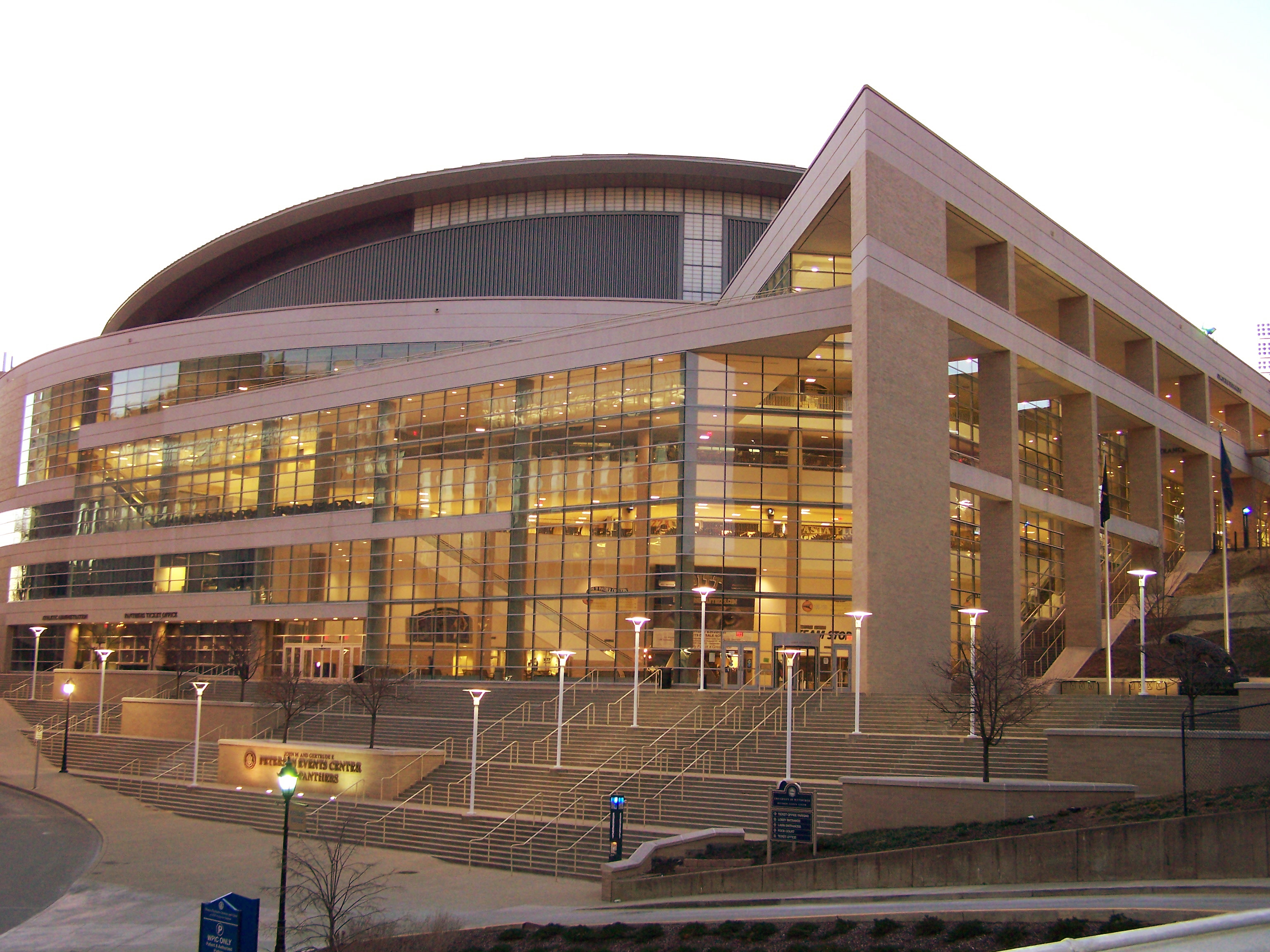

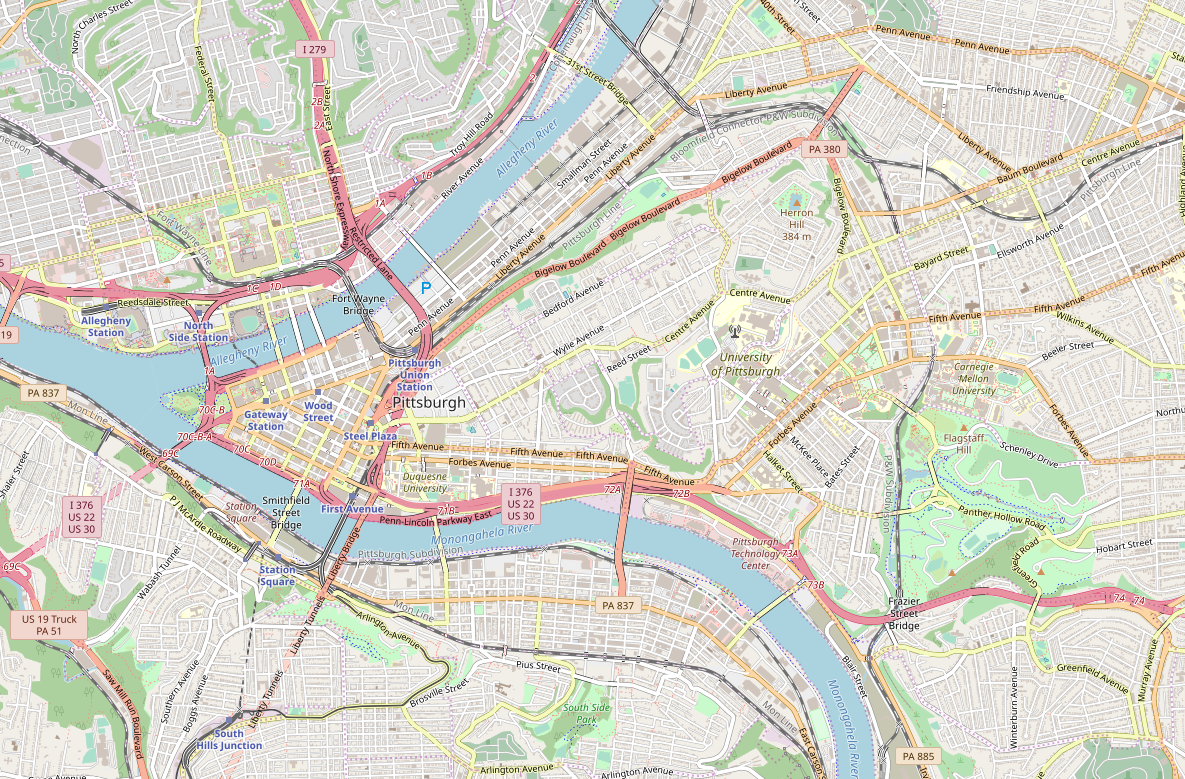
- Location near Downtown Pittsburgh Location in Pennsylvania Location in the United States
- Interactive map of Petersen Events Center
- Address: 3719 Terrace Street
- Location: Pittsburgh, Pennsylvania, U.S.
- Coordinates: 40.443777°N 79.962274°W
- Operator: ASM Global
- Capacity: Basketball: 12,508; End stage concerts: 9,000; Hockey: 8,600
- Surface: Hardwood Basketball Court
- Field size: Arena size: 430,000 total square feet

Construction
- Groundbreaking: June 15, 2000
- Opened: April 27, 2002
- Cost: $119 million
- Architects: Apostolou Associates; Rosser International of Atlanta
- Structural engineer: Walter P Moore & Associates
- Services engineers: Brinjac, Kambic & Associates
- General contractors: Pitt-Center Partners (joint venture of Mizerak Towers and Associates, P.J. Dick Inc. and O'Brien Construction)

Tenants
- Pittsburgh Panthers (NCAA) (2002–present); Pittsburgh Xplosion (CBA) (2006–2008)

Website
- peterseneventscenter.com

The Petersen Events Center (more commonly known as "The Pete") is a 12,508-seat multi-purpose arena on the campus of the University of Pittsburgh in the Oakland neighborhood. The arena is named for philanthropists John Petersen and his wife Gertrude, who donated $10 million for its construction. John Petersen, a Pitt alumnus, is a native of nearby Erie and is the retired president and CEO of Erie Insurance Group. The center won the 2003 Innovative Architecture & Design Honor Award from Recreation Management magazine.

== History ==
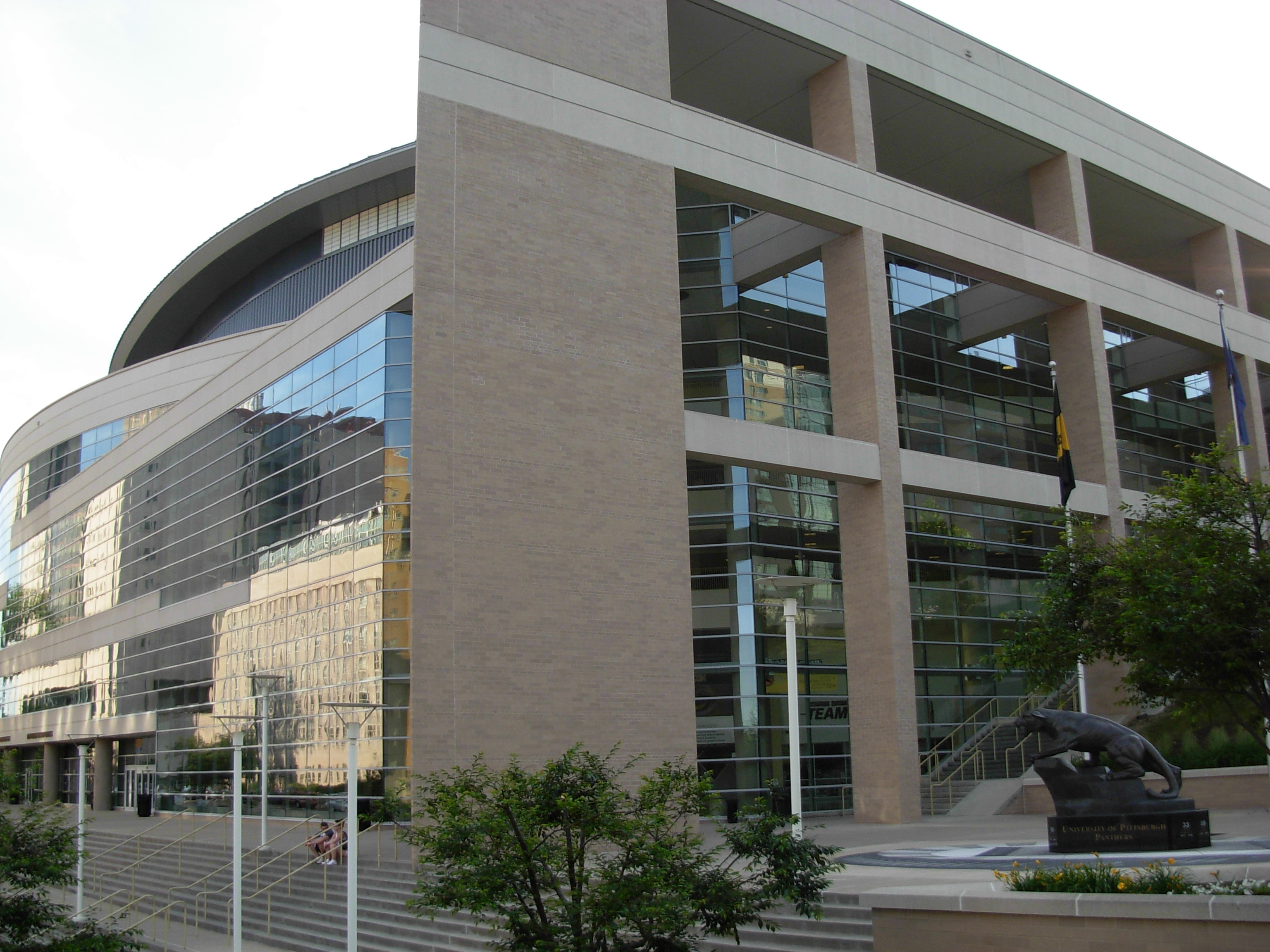
The Petersen Events Center's plaza is also the site of one of the campus' Panther statues and the former site of Pitt Stadium.

The arena opened in 2002 on part of the former site of Pitt Stadium, which housed the university's football team from 1925 to 1999. The Pitt men's and women's basketball programs make their home here, having previously resided in Fitzgerald Field House. The new building, due to its larger capacity, also meant that Pitt no longer had to play certain games or hold graduation ceremonies at the Civic Arena.

Its first event was a Counting Crows concert. For concerts the center seats 9,000 for end-stage shows, 14,763 for center-stage shows. The first official women's basketball game at the Pete was a 90–51 win over Robert Morris University on November 22, 2002. The first official men's basketball game at the Pete was an 82–67 win over Duquesne University on November 23, 2002. Since its creation through the end of the 2012–13 season, the Pitt men's basketball team has compiled a record of 180–22 (.891) at the Pete, including a 9–1 record against teams ranked in the top five. Pitt broke the 100 win mark on November 22, 2008, with an 86–60 win over Indiana University of Pennsylvania, and the 200 win mark on December 30, 2014, vs. Florida Gulf Coast University.

In 2006, the Pittsburgh Xplosion, a professional basketball team in the Continental Basketball Association, played its first game at the arena. The team folded just prior to the start of the 2008–09 season.

In October 2011, a new high definition video board was installed in the Petersen Events Center.

Since 2010, the Petersen Events Center has been used as the primary alternative to the much larger PPG Paints Arena, which replaced Mellon Arena, and is now the Pittsburgh home of Disney on Ice, Marvel Universe Live! and the Big3, and hosted the Ringling Brothers Barnum and Bailey Circus in its final years. The Petersen Events Center also serves as the primary venue for All Elite Wrestling (AEW), as WWE has exclusive rights to host professional wrestling at PPG Paints Arena while Stage AE (the primary venue for Ring of Honor and NXT) is too small for AEW.

== Amenities ==
With 430,000 total square feet, the Pete seats 12,508 for basketball and 9,000 for end stage concerts. The arena features 16,000 square feet (1,500 m^{2}) of lobby space with 90-foot (27 m) high ceilings and 42,000 square feet (3,900 m^{2}) of glass with a barely visible coating that allows sunlight through while controlling heat loss and gain. A video score board that had previous hung in Pitt Stadium was also installed in the lobby. The arena also features 18 luxury suites, including five courtside luxury suites (the only college arena with courtside suites) and a 193-seat SuperSuite.

== Student section and accolades ==
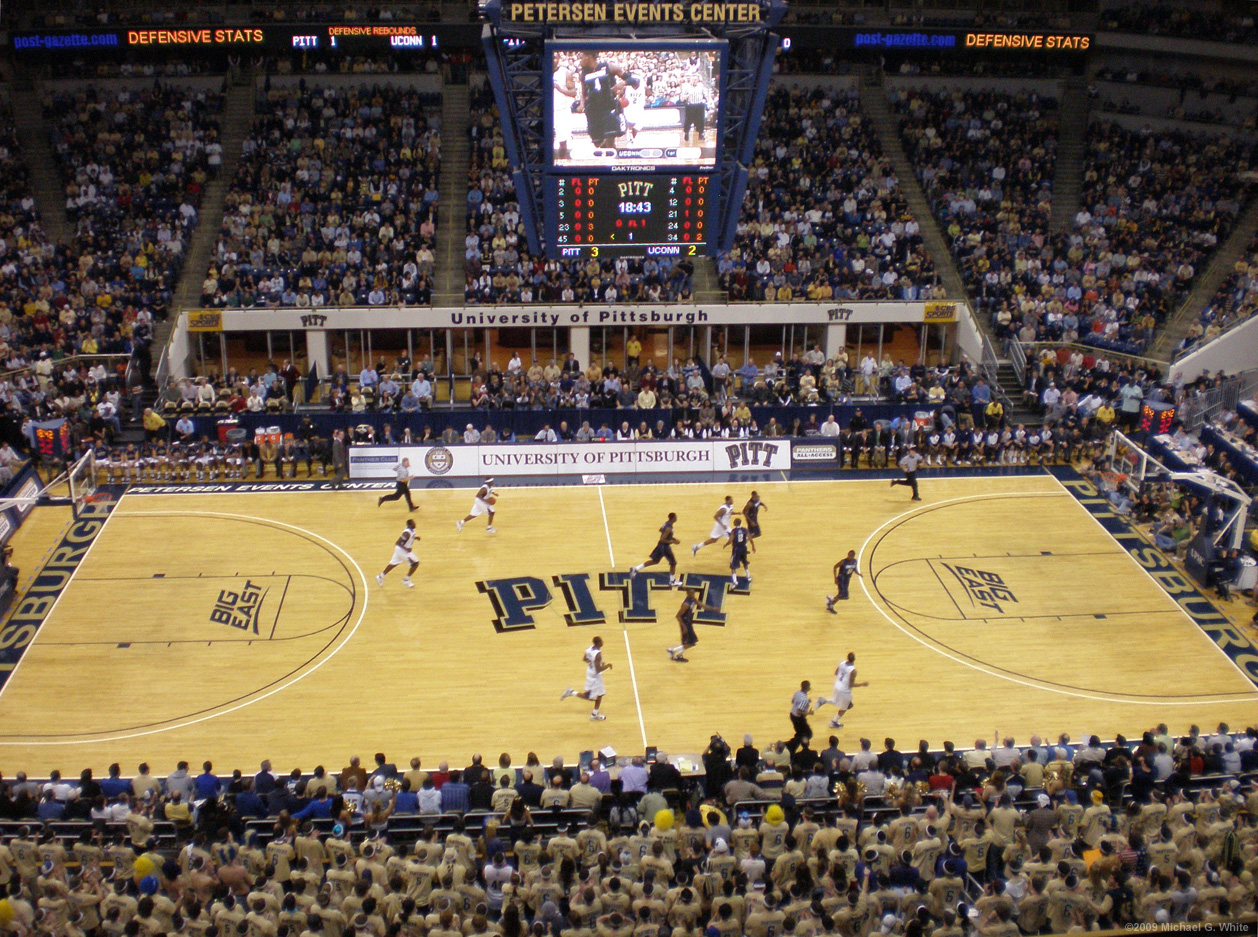
The early minutes of a game against number one ranked UConn in 2009. A portion of the Oakland Zoo can be seen at the bottom. Pitt won the nationally televised game 70–60.

The section known as the Oakland Zoo is composed of the sections across from the team benches and next to the court. The name comes from Oakland, the neighborhood where Pitt's campus resides. The students in the Zoo wear gold T-shirts with the words "Oakland Zoo" in some way, shape or form across the front. This layout and unity is a large factor in why the Pete is such a tough place to play for opposing teams. Pitt has lost only five home non-conference games out of over 120 since the Panthers moved into the Pete in 2002.

In 2006, Sports Illustrated surveyed the Big East Conference's basketball players, and the Pete was named the "Toughest Place to Play," with specific players mentioning the Oakland Zoo and the fans' creativity. In 2013, the facility was also ranked as having the second best game time environment in the nation by USA Today.

The Petersen Events Center also has received accolades for being the sixth loudest college basketball venue according to ESPN the Magazine, the eighth best overall college basketball venue according to ESPN's Jason King, and among the toughest places for opponents to play in college basketball according to multiple Bleacher Report articles. The Pitt men's basketball team has also sold out of season tickets since the venue opened.

In 2007 and 2010, "The Pete" hosted first and second-round games of the NCAA Women's Division I Tournament.

== Other uses ==
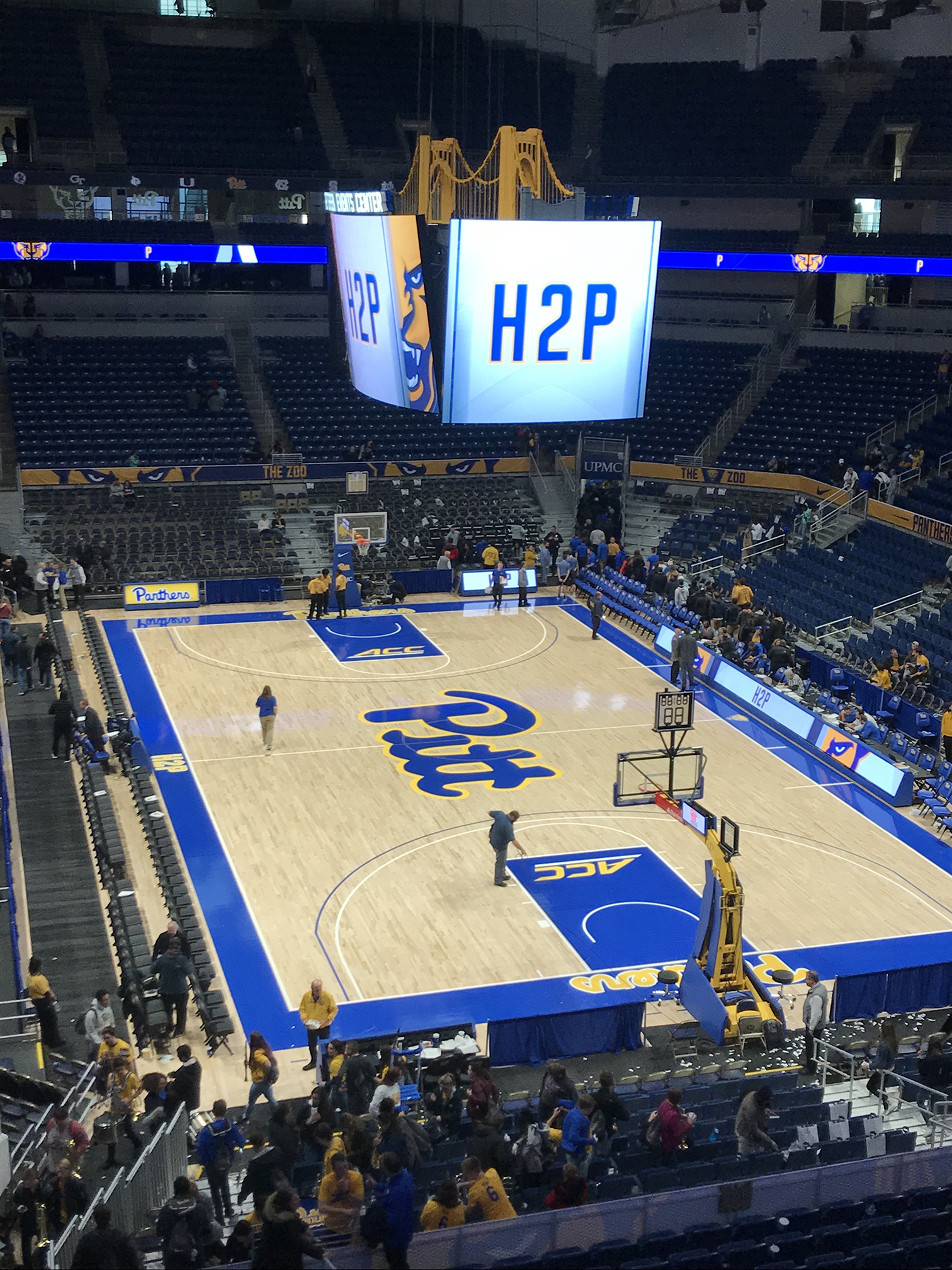
An inside view of the arena in November, 2019

The Petersen Events Center serves as more than just the home court of the Panthers basketball teams. Located within the facility is a 40,000-square-foot (3,700 m^{2}) Baierl Student Recreation Center featuring four racquetball courts, two squash courts, Cybex weight machines, a free weight area, aerobics practice room, martial arts room, health assessment area, and aerobic area with treadmills, exercise bikes, elliptical and Stairmaster machines and four plasma TVs.

In addition, the McCarl Panthers Hall of Champions, which pays homage to and displays memorabilia from past Pitt athletics achievements, and the official Pittsburgh Panthers Team Store are located in the main lobby of the Pete.

Also included is the Willis Center for Academics for student athletes which includes computer and writing labs, a math and science area, individual tutor rooms, and a career resource area.

Also, a food court is located within the Pete and is available to students and others during the weekdays in addition to when events are being hosted within the arena.

The arena also features an auxiliary practice basketball facility, athletic training, office and media facilities.

The Pitt women's volleyball team plays some bigger matches occasionally at the Pete, instead of its primary venue, Fitzgerald Field House. The Panthers hosted the opening weekend of the 2018, 2019, and 2021 tournaments at the Pete.

The Pete also hosts the university's commencement ceremony.

On Wednesday, October 23, 2019, All Elite Wrestling broadcast its weekly TV series Dynamite live on TNT network. The event hosted the fifth anniversary of Dynamite on October 2, 2024.

== Notable events ==
The University of Pittsburgh's School of Medicine, Scaife Hall, and the Thomas E. Starzl Biomedical Science Tower can be seen reflected in the Pete's glass facade.

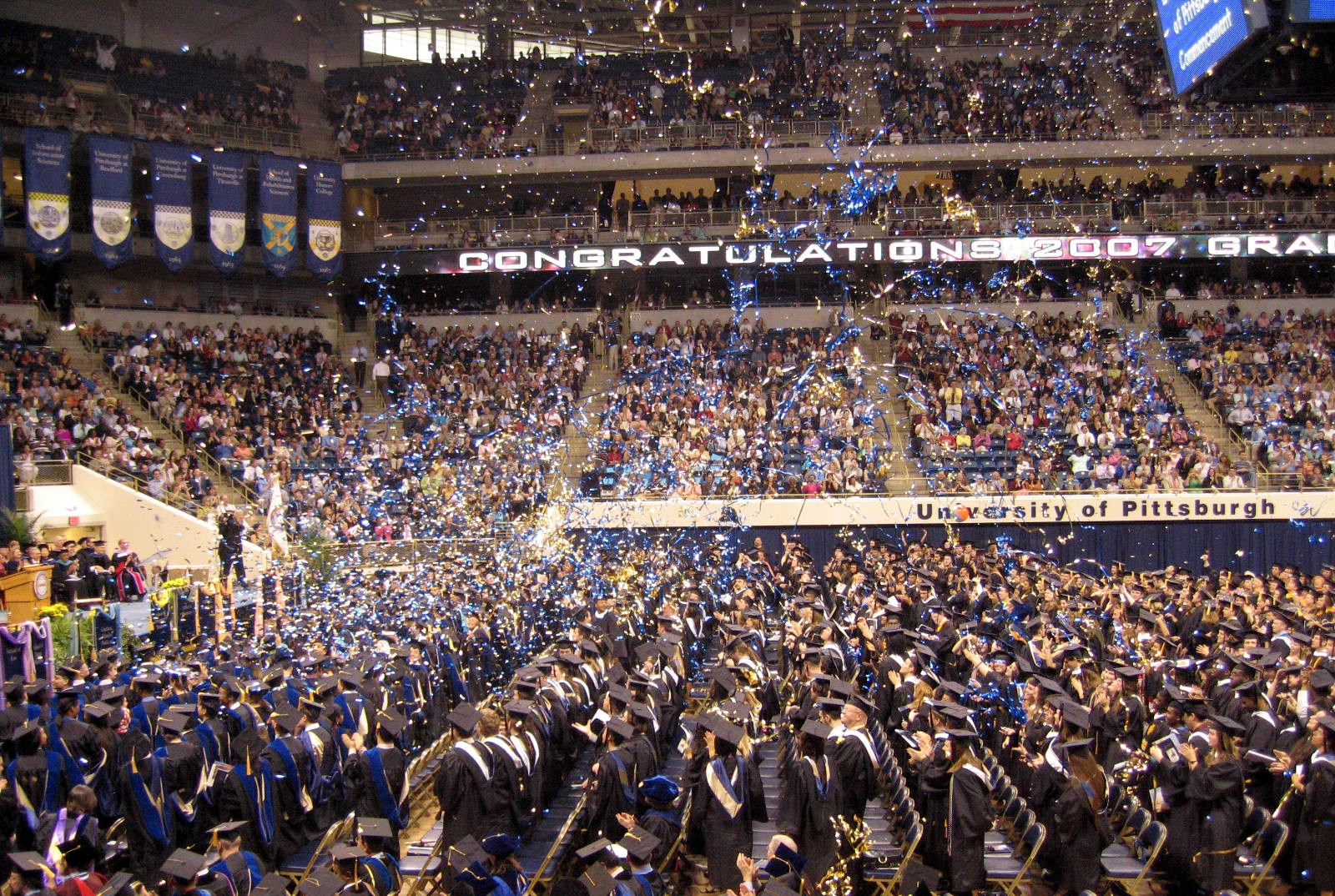
The Pete also hosts Pitt's graduation ceremonies.

- 2004: Jeopardy! College Championship
- 2005: Senior Olympics (headquarters, basketball, volleyball, racquetball, table tennis)
- 2007: NCAA Women's Division I Basketball Championship - first and second-round games
- 2008: Presidential campaign rally for Senator Barack Obama on April 21; National Kidney Foundation U.S. Transplant Games (closing ceremonies)
- 2009: Funeral for victims of a shootout between a gunman and police officers
- 2010: NCAA Women's Division I Basketball Championship - first and second-round games
- 2011: Katy Perry's California Dreams Tour
- 2013: P!nk's The Truth About Love Tour
- 2013: Avril Lavigne's The Avril Lavigne Tour
- 2014: Demi Lovato's Demi World Tour
- 2014: The Black Keys' Turn Blue Tour
- 2015: Ariana Grande's The Honeymoon Tour.
- 2017: Panic! at the Disco's Death of a Bachelor Tour
- 2017: Green Day's Revolution Radio Tour
- 2017: Phish
- 2018: A Day to Remember
- 2018: Arctic Monkeys's Tranquility Base Hotel & Casino Tour
- 2019: Trevor Noah
- 2019: Phish
- 2019: JoJo Siwa
- 2019: All Elite Wrestling's Dynamite October 23 episode
- 2021: All Elite Wrestling's Dynamite August 11 episode and the premiere of AEW Rampage on August 13
- 2022: Tyler, The Creator
- 2022: All Elite Wrestling's Dynamite April 20 episode and taping of the April 22 episode of AEW Rampage
- 2022: Deftones
- 2022: AJR
- 2022: Big Time Rush's Forever Tour
- 2023: The Killers's Imploding the Mirage Tour
- 2023: All Elite Wrestling's Dynamite April 19 episode and taping of the April 21 episode of AEW Rampage
- 2024: Riley Green with Ella Langley's Ain't My Last Rodeo Tour
- 2024: TobyMac's Hits Deep Tour
- 2024: All Elite Wrestling's Dynamite October 2 episode and taping of the October 4 episode of AEW Rampage
- 2024: Lainey Wilson
- 2025: Phish
- 2025: All Elite Wrestling's Dynamite September 24 episode
- 2025: Lorde
- 2026: Brit Floyd
- 2026: Phil Wickham
- 2026: All Elite Wrestling's Dynamite September 30 episode, better known as A Tribute to Pac after the unexpected death of the wrestler a few days earlier

== Fictional portrayals ==
In the 2011 movie Warrior, the arena plays host to a fictional mixed martial arts tournament with Jennifer Morrison and Nick Nolte in attendance.

== Incidents ==
At a March 30, 2011 concert by the band Furthur, a 19-year-old man ran through a window at the arena and fell four stories. Police said in the moments leading up to the incident, the man got into a football stance, yelled "hike," and launched himself through the glass. The man was taken to UPMC Presbyterian Hospital with massive head trauma. He was pronounced dead just after 12:20 a.m.

== See also ==
- List of NCAA Division I basketball arenas

== Gallery ==
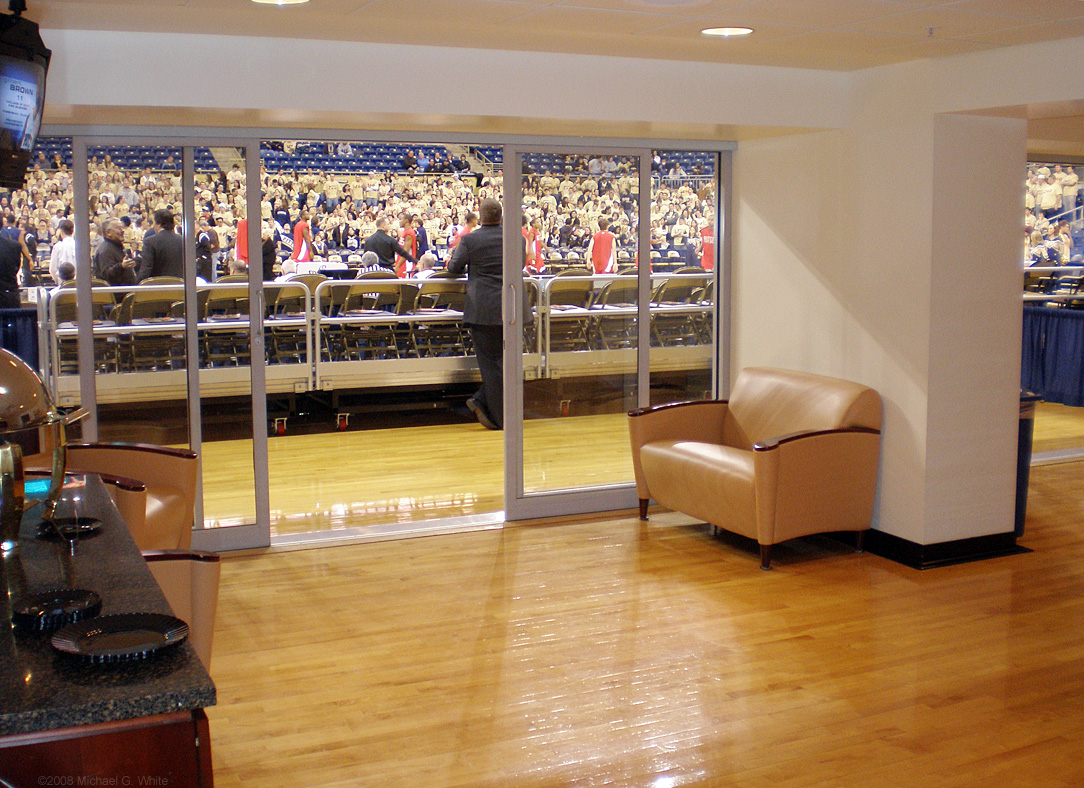
Floor level luxury suite

Panther outside the Pete

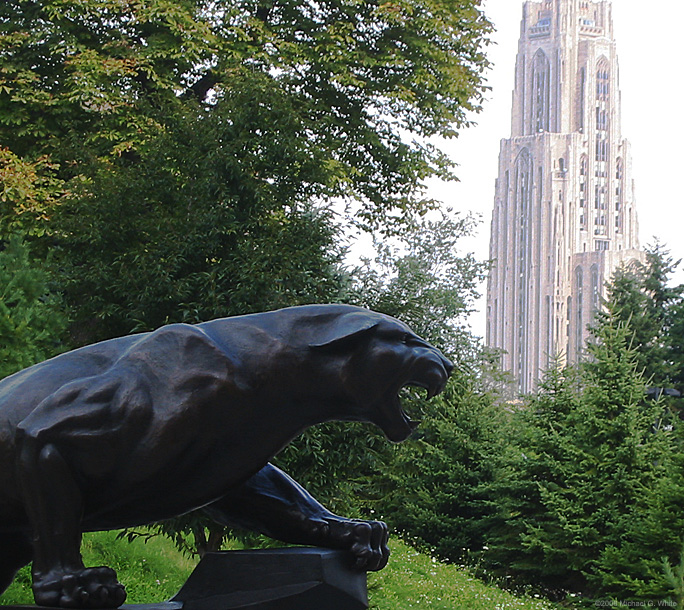
Panther outside the Pete

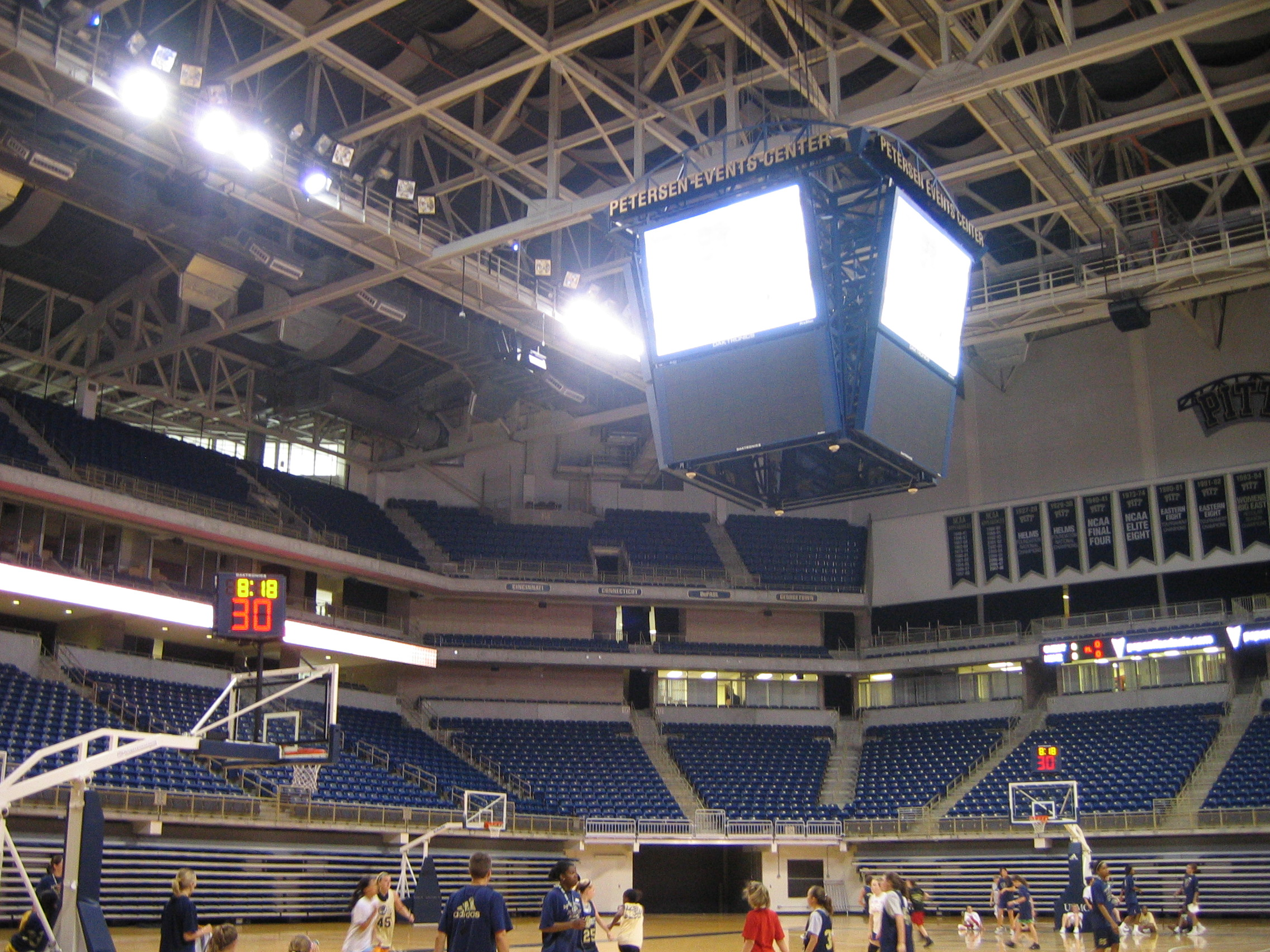
Main court with floor seats folded up

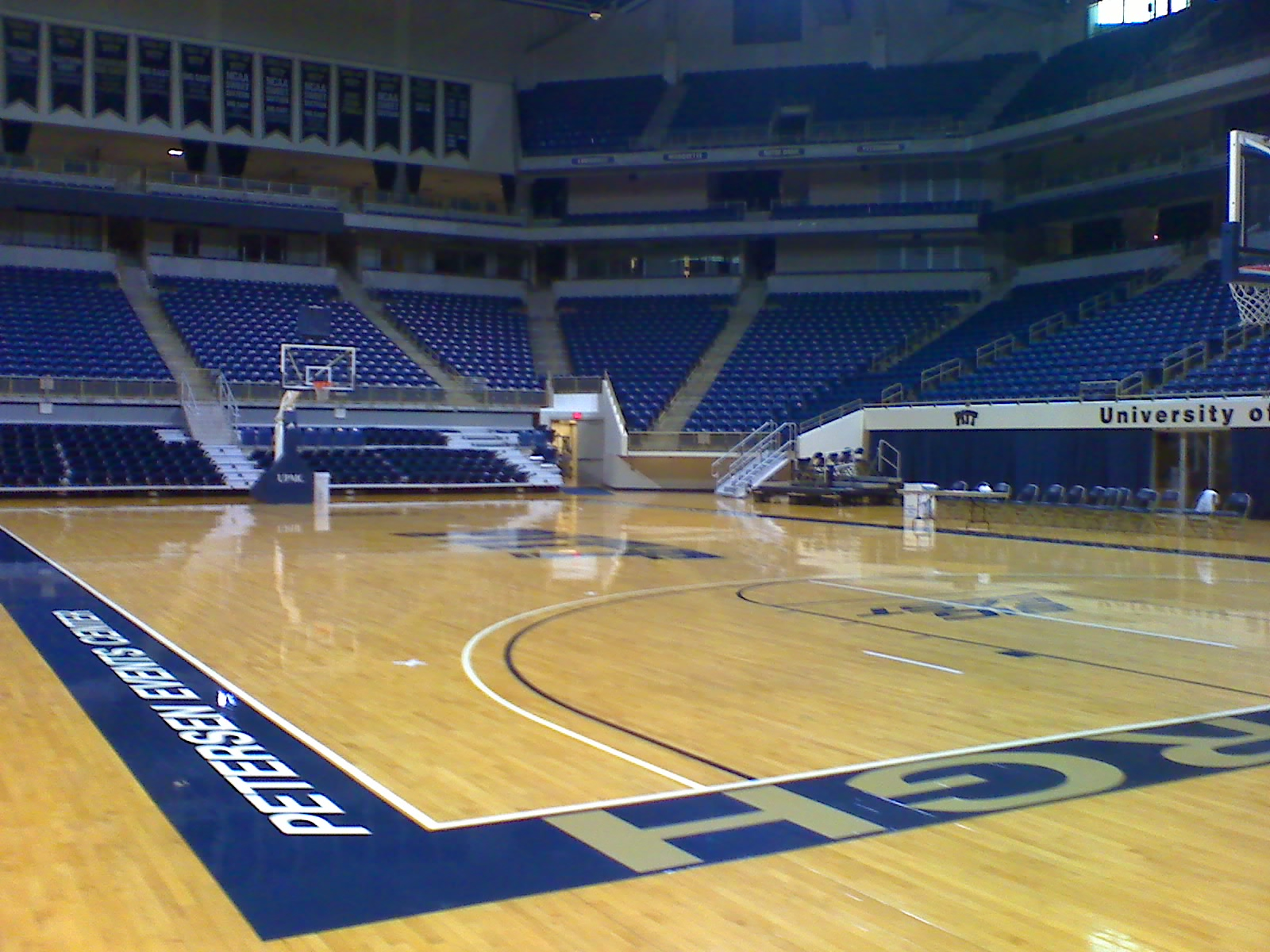
A view of the arena floor

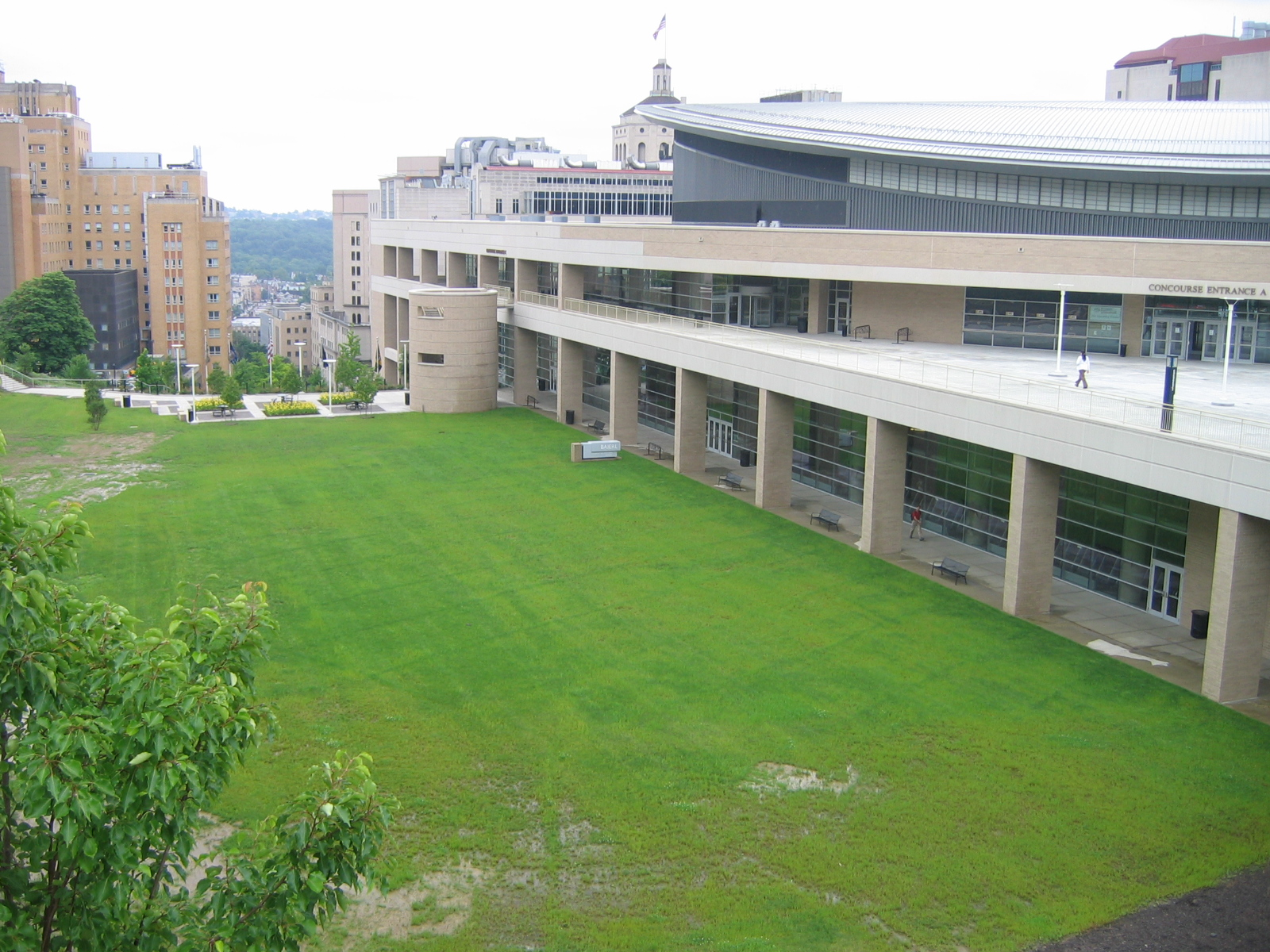
Looking down on the Pete lawn from Sutherland Drive. The lower level of the Pete shows the outside of the Baierl Rec Center.

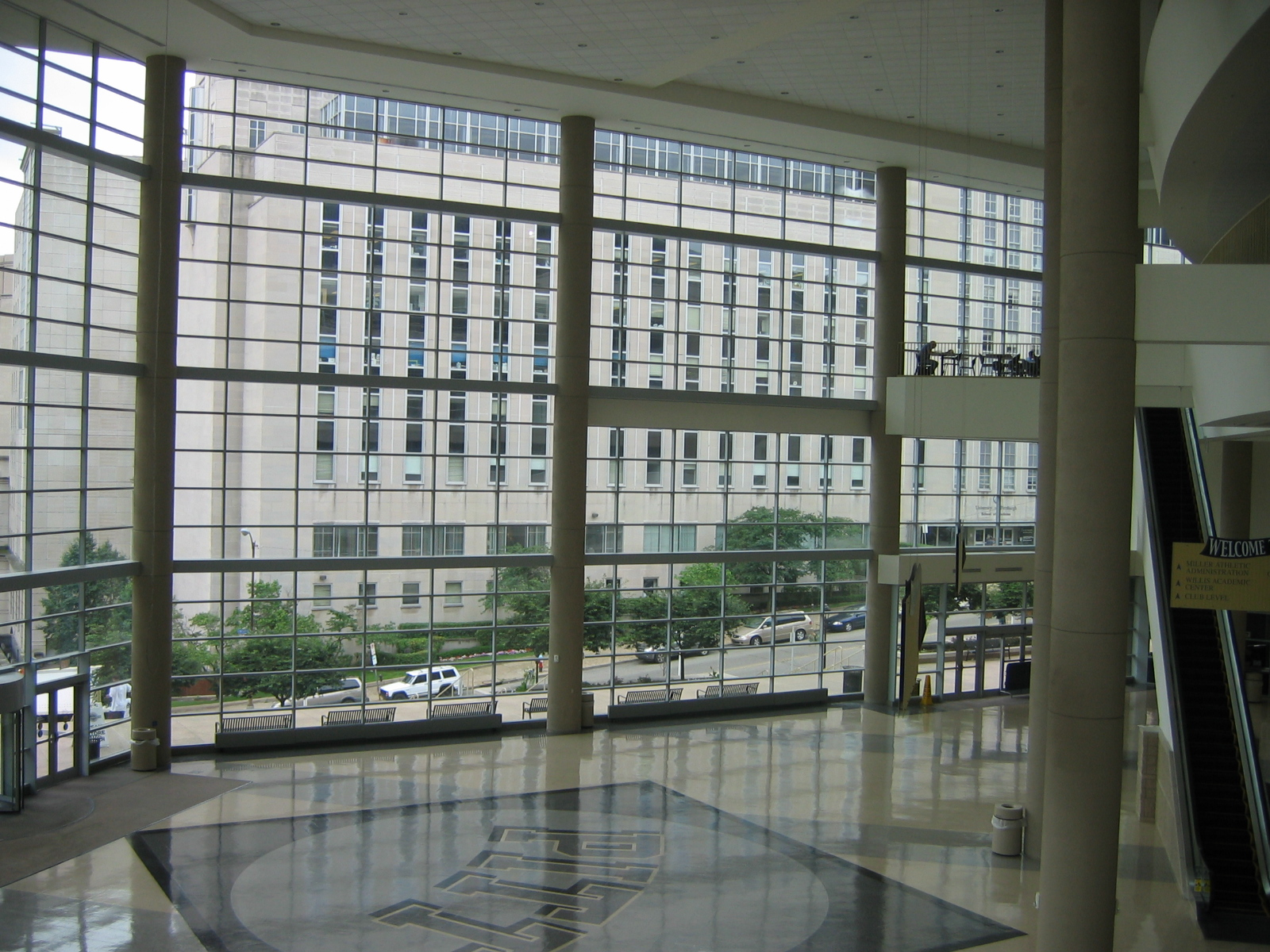
Inside the main lobby looking out to Scaife Hall

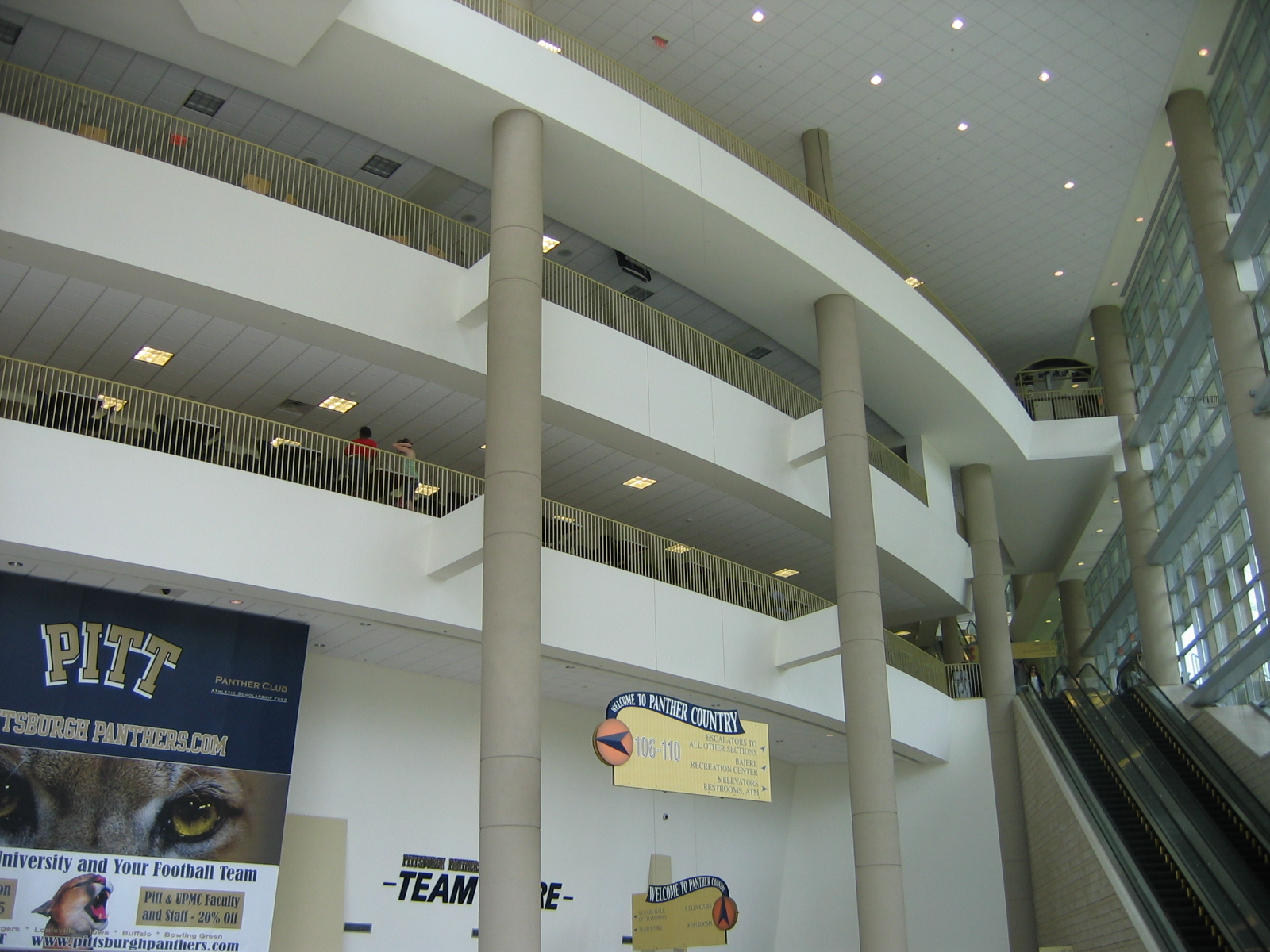
Interior main lobby escalators

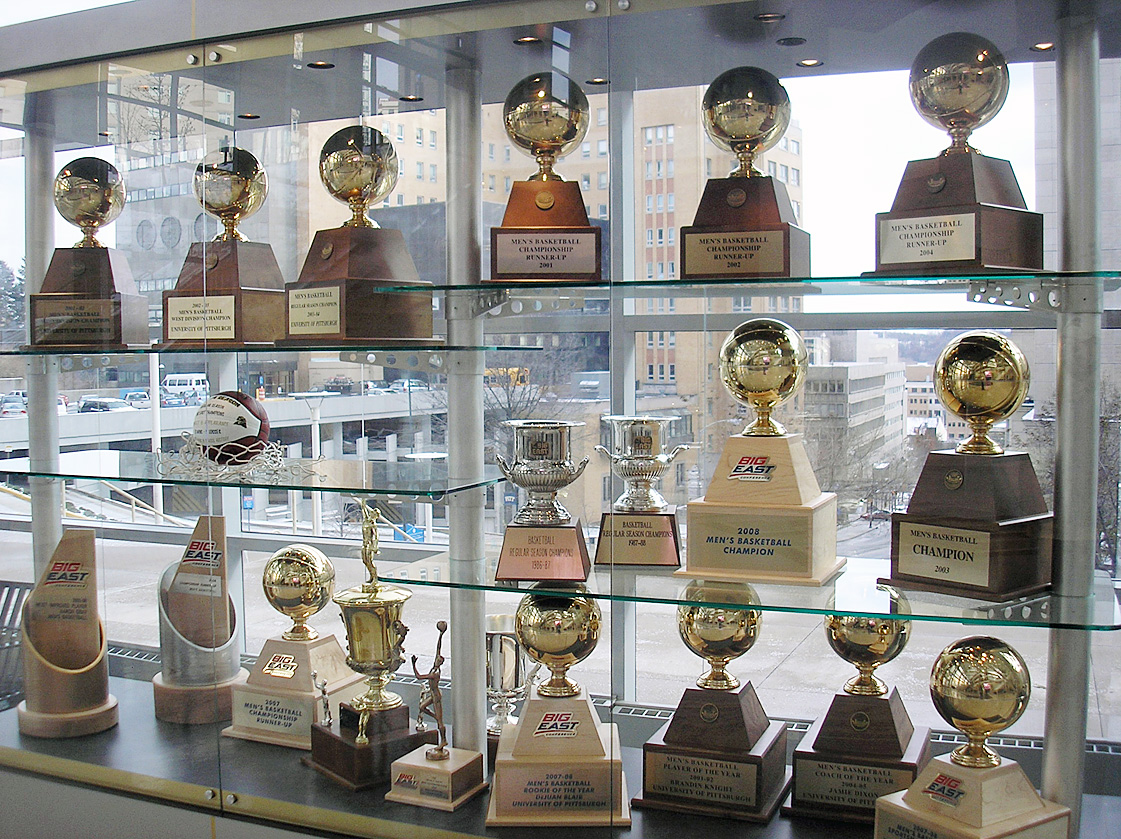
Men's basketball trophy display

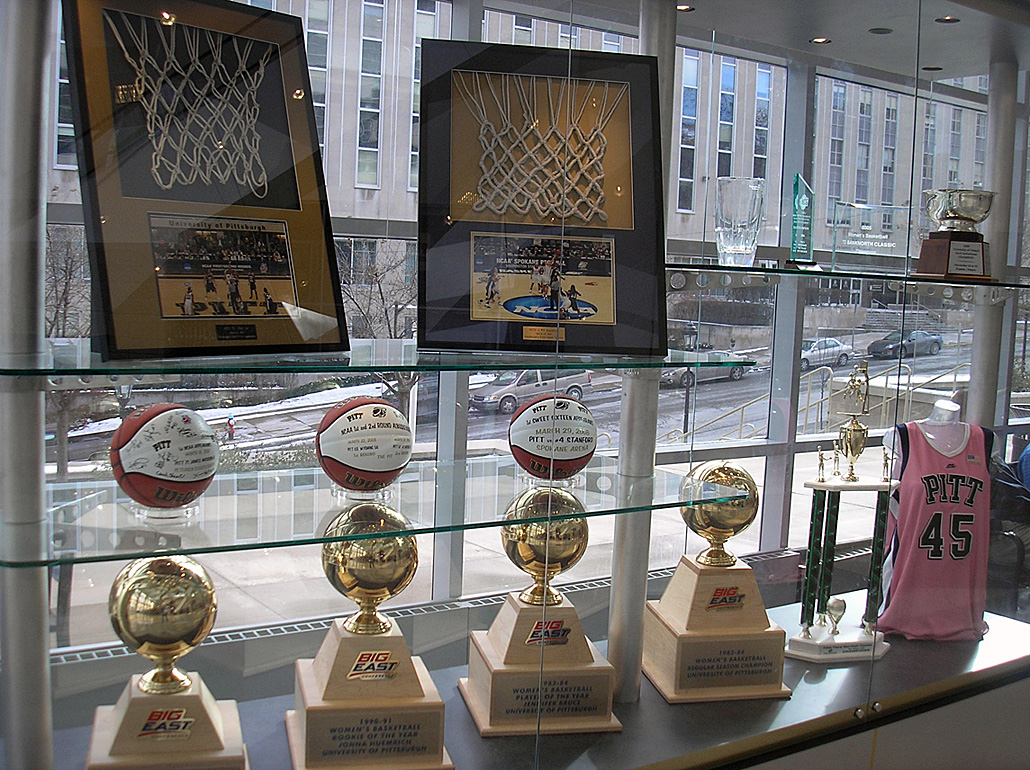
Women's basketball trophy display

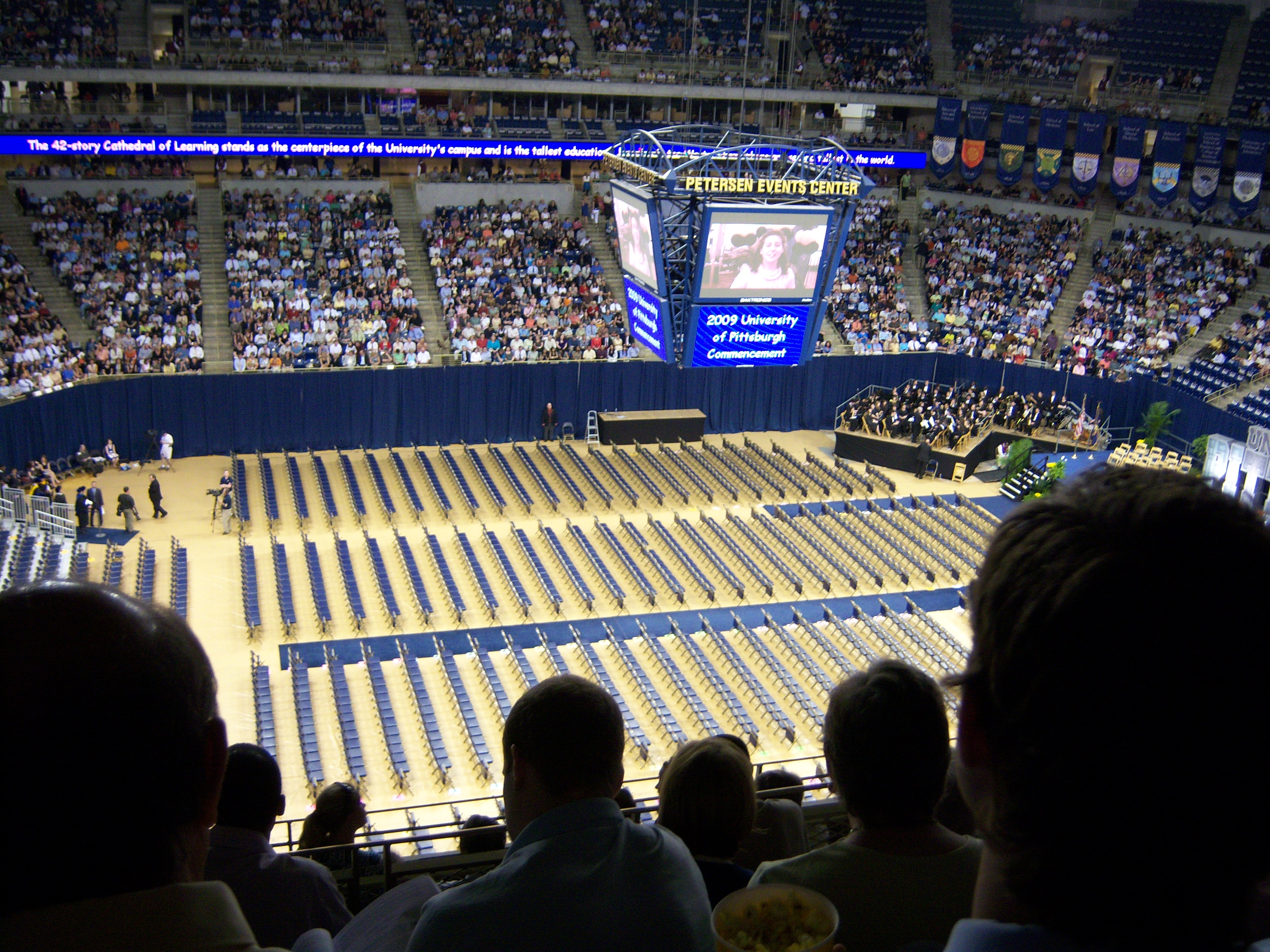
The Pete set up for the April 2009 Commencement

Preceded by Sennott Square	University of Pittsburgh buildings Petersen Events Center; Constructed: 2002	Succeeded by Pennsylvania Hall
Preceded by Payne Whitney Gymnasium	Host of the Jeopardy! College Championship; 2004	Succeeded by PNC Arena
