= Giuseppe Moretti =

American sculptor

- Born: 3 February 1857; Siena, Grand Duchy of Tuscany
- Died: February 1935 (aged 77-78); San Remo, Italy
- Known for: Sculpture
- Notable work: Vulcan, the largest cast iron statue in the world
- Movement: Beaux arts
- Awards: Bronze Medal, 1900 Paris Exposition; Silver Medal, 1904 St. Louis Exposition; Silver Medal, 1911 Turin International

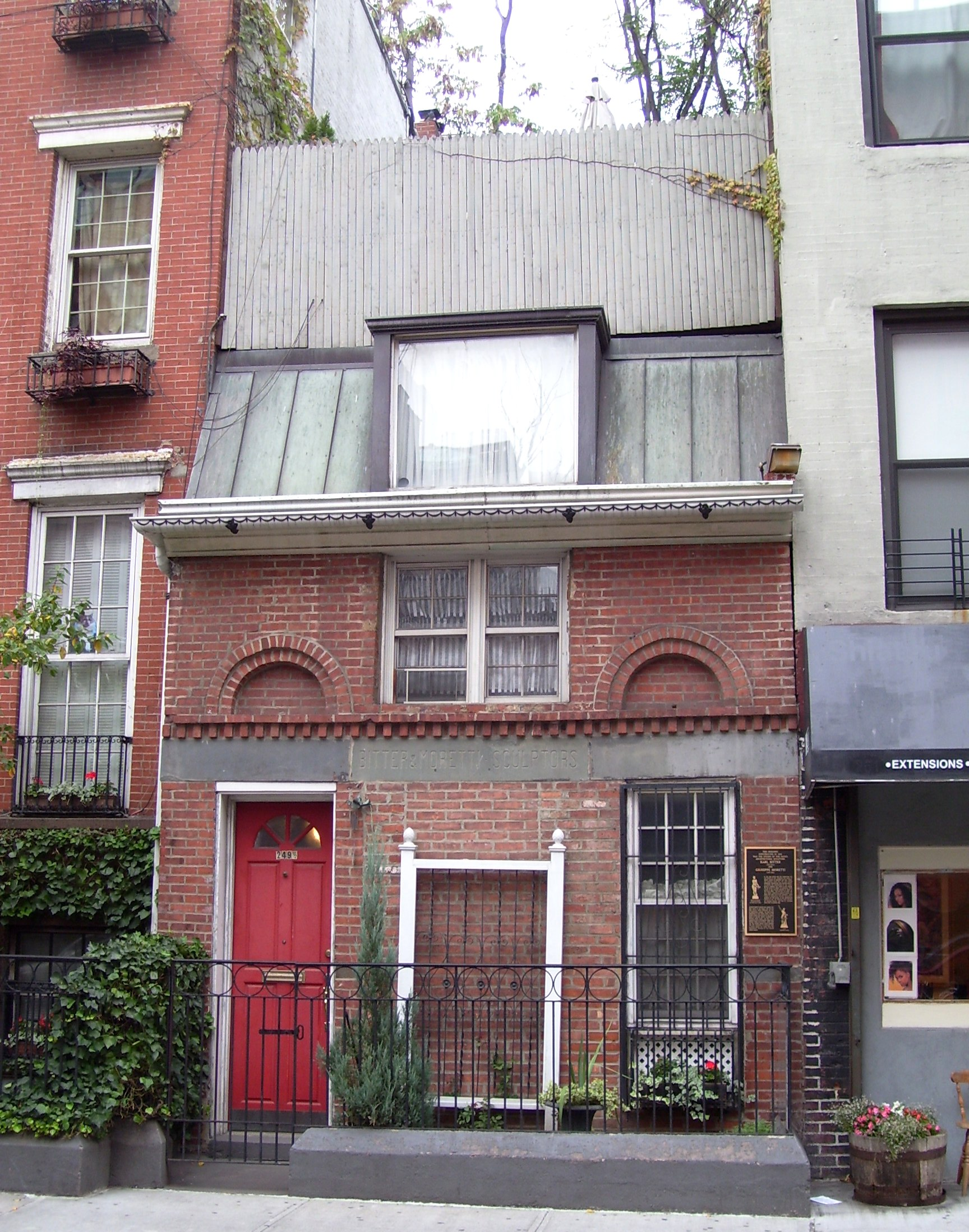
The studio in Manhattan that Moretti shared with Karl Bitter

Giuseppe Moretti (3 February 1857 – February 1935) was an Italian émigré sculptor who became known in the United States for his public monuments in bronze and marble. Notable among his works is Vulcan in Birmingham, Alabama, which is the largest cast iron statue in the world. On a personal level, Moretti was "known for his eclectic personality and for always wearing a green tie," but professionally, is claimed to be "the first man to use aluminum in art." Moretti enjoyed some celebrity in his lifetime, and was a friend of famed Italian tenor Enrico Caruso. It is even reported that the singer repeatedly praised Moretti's voice.

== Early years ==
Giuseppe Moretti was born in Siena, Italy, on 3 February 1857, the nephew of Cardinal Vincenzo Moretti, a noted art patron. He began studying marble sculpting at the age of 9 with the monks of San Domenico and with sculptor Tito Sarrocchi, whose studio was in the cloister of the church in Siena. Moretti's precocious nature is emphasized in an anecdote about his early fascination with becoming an artist. Apparently aware that distant Florence was the nexus of Italian art, the young Moretti set off down the road in search of a career in the art world. An alert neighbor returned the would-be runaway, and soon after, Moretti was placed under the tutelage of Serrochi.

== Training and career in Europe ==
Moretti later studied at the Accademia di Belle Arti di Firenze (Academy of Fine Arts of Florence), working in the studio of Giovanni Dupre.

Intrigued by the medium of marble, Moretti moved to Carrara to perfect his skill. In about 1879, a Dalmatian sculptor, Ivan Rendić, who saw his work was impressed and invited Moretti to assist him in his studio in Zagreb, Croatia. Moretti set up shop in Zagreb and made several important commissions before a large earthquake devastated the area. Moretti decided to leave, moving to Vienna, Austria, where he worked on the Rothschild palace and executed a marble bust of the Emperor Franz Josef which was to be exhibited in the Paris Exposition of 1900.

Moretti's next residence was in Budapest, Hungary, where he executed some works to commemorate the city's history. However, a dispute with German authorities over a marble field that Moretti wanted to use for his projects and as an incentive to local sculptors frustrated Moretti and in the summer of 1888, he decided to relocate to the United States of America.

== Career in the United States ==
Moretti arrived in New York City and opened a studio. Soon, Moretti was working on his first commission in America, sculpture for Marble House, the seasonal residence of William K. and Alva Vanderbilt in Newport, Rhode Island. On this project, Moretti worked with Richard Morris Hunt to produce the interior's marble friezes and statuary, including work on bas-reliefs of the architect himself and Jules Hardouin Mansart, the master architect for Louis XIV during the construction of Palace of Versailles; and which stood side by side on the mezzanine level of the staircase.

=== Commissions in Pittsburgh ===
After working on the Vanderbilt estate, Moretti became well known in Pittsburgh, Pennsylvania, maintaining a presence there from 1895 until 1923. Edward Bigelow, Pittsburgh's director of public works commissioned Moretti in 1885 for works in Schenley Park. Moretti immediately recognized the potential of Pittsburgh's rugged terrain for such a vast project. Arthur Hamerschlag, the first president of the Carnegie Institute of Technology, also did much to popularize Moretti's work in Pittsburgh. Moretti sculpted the family of bronze figures atop granite columns at the entrance to Highland Park, a pair of boys taming horses at the Stanton Avenue entrance to the park, a statue of Stephen Foster and an African-American bard playing "Uncle Ned" paid through children's donated pennies in the park, and a marble fountain above the N. St. Clair stone steps entrance to the park. In Pittsburgh's civic center of Oakland, he cast a bronze tribute to Bigelow, four bronze panthers for the Panther Hollow Bridge, the University of Pittsburgh bronze panther mascot, and Hygiea as a tribute to the county's doctors in World War I, as well as numerous tablets, plaques, and award statuettes. Moretti has been called the "go-to civic sculptor during Pittsburgh's City Beautiful period." When Bigelow failed to get reelected, Moretti's commission was discarded by the new city officers.

=== Relocation to Alabama ===
The first of many failed business ventures for Moretti was in 1897, when he and fellow Italian immigrant Riccardo Bertelli (future husband of actress Ida Conquest) launched a small bronze foundry in December of that year with the help of a $20,000 loan from another Italian émigré, Celestino Piva, a wealthy silk importer. However, in two years the company collapsed and Piva withdrew support. Yet Bertelli bought out Moretti's share, reorganized the business, and renamed it "Roman Bronze Works." By 1900, the foundry had relocated from Manhattan to Brooklyn, secured the financial backing of Piva once again, and acquired the exclusive casting rights to the works of American sculptor Frederic Remington.

Despite his financial misdealings, Moretti retained his reputation as an artist, and soon won his most famous commission from James A. MacKnight, secretary of Birmingham, Alabama's Commercial Club. Moretti agreed to charge only $6,000 for the massive plaster model of Vulcan, which was to be Birmingham's contribution to the St. Louis Exposition. Moretti created the model in New York City and moved to Alabama to work on the sculpture in 1904. In 1907, he took Geneva Mercer of Alabama on as an apprentice. She served as his apprentice until 1909, after which she stayed on as his assistant until his death in 1935.

Having discovered Alabama's rich marble deposits, Moretti made it a personal goal to institute proper mining procedures for the material.

=== Living in Cuba ===
Circa 1911–1914, Moretti and Mercer worked together on their greatest achievement, the completion of Moretti's ninety-seven sculptures for the Gran Teatro de La Habana.

== Other commissions and later life ==
Moretti moved around east of the Mississippi frequently after 1916, returning to Pittsburgh, where he established a permanent residence and studio on Bigelow Boulevard.

Moretti soon made war memorials a major source of his income, completing sculptures and tablets in Ohio, Pennsylvania, and elsewhere. Moretti is known to have remarked that "... art, in its various meanings is to be benefited greatly by the sentiment that the world war had reawakened..." Moretti also believed that Pittsburgh would become the "Athens of the New World," spurred on by artistic creation. "No," declared Moretti, "I shall not leave Pittsburgh – it is the fine home for the artist – strong, mighty, rugged-so!"

Meanwhile, Moretti was pursuing a career in business by purchasing marble quarries, becoming a pioneer in the Alabama marble industry, and traveling to Birmingham in 1901 to develop the Alabama marble fields. In 1923, when he finally left Pittsburgh, he bought his last Alabama marble quarry, which failed in 1925.

One of Moretti's last works in America was the 1927 "Battle of Nashville Monument", erected on the site of that 1864 battle. It was commissioned by the Ladies Battlefield Association, and honored both sides of the conflict in the American Civil War.

In 1897, Moretti designed the bronze statue of Cornelius Vanderbilt on the campus of Vanderbilt University in Nashville. It was first erected on the grounds of the Parthenon, but moved to the campus the following fall.

In 1921, Moretti designed a bronze and granite statue on the tomb of Sumner Archibald Cunningham, a Confederate veteran and editor of the Confederate Veteran, at the Willow Mount Cemetery in Shelbyville, Tennessee.

In 1928, he designed a statue of Elizabeth and Joseph E. Brown, a former governor of Georgia and his wife, which was dedicated on the grounds of the Georgia State Capitol in Atlanta.

== Retirement to Italy and death ==
Moretti's last business venture having fallen through in 1925 and his health failing, he decided to return to Italy with his wife, Dorothea Long Moretti, and his assistant, Geneva Mercer, in 1930. He remained there until his death in San Remo in 1935.

== Works ==
Moretti was a prolific artist, having completed twelve World War I memorials, nineteen monumental works, six church sculptures, twenty-four memorial tablets, fourteen cemetery memorials, twenty-seven sculptures in marble, bronze, and aluminum, and twenty-seven bronze statuettes.

=== In Pittsburgh ===
At least 17 Moretti works remain and have been restored in Pittsburgh's east end. Moretti's notable work in Pittsburgh includes the Highland Avenue entrance to Highland Park, an imposing granite construction decorated with bronze groups and figures; the Stanton Avenue entrance to Highland Park, depicting two groups of lean, heroic youths taming wild horses; the four bronze Panthers erected on Panther Hollow Bridge; and Stephen Foster, a tribute to the songwriter which features a rendering of "Old Black Joe" playing the banjo at the feet of the composer. His statues of Edward Manning Bigelow (1895) and Hygeia (1922) also populate Schenley Park.

=== In Alabama ===
Moretti's most important works in Alabama are his Vulcan and the one most prized by Moretti himself, Head of Christ. Moretti said, "I selected the marble myself with infinite care, the very first piece from the Sylacauga quarries ever to be used for an artistic purpose." He also told his friend, Alice Jeffress Boswell, "I have a peculiar affection for it. Where I go, my Christ goes also.... I feel that the final resting place of this first sculpture from Alabama marble should be in that state."

He also sculpted a baptismal font for the 1st Presbyterian Church of Birmingham; a life-size Sylacauga marble statue of Mary Cahalan, a beloved public school teacher; and a larger than life-size bronze statue of William Elias B. Davis, a noted surgeon and co-founder of the Southern Surgical Association.

Moretti's Head of Christ is on display in Montgomery's Alabama Department of Archives and History.

== Gallery ==
Head of Christ, what Moretti considered to be his personal magnum opus. Moretti carved the bust by hand from Alabama marble.

Scale model of the entrance to Schenley Park in Pittsburgh, circa 1900

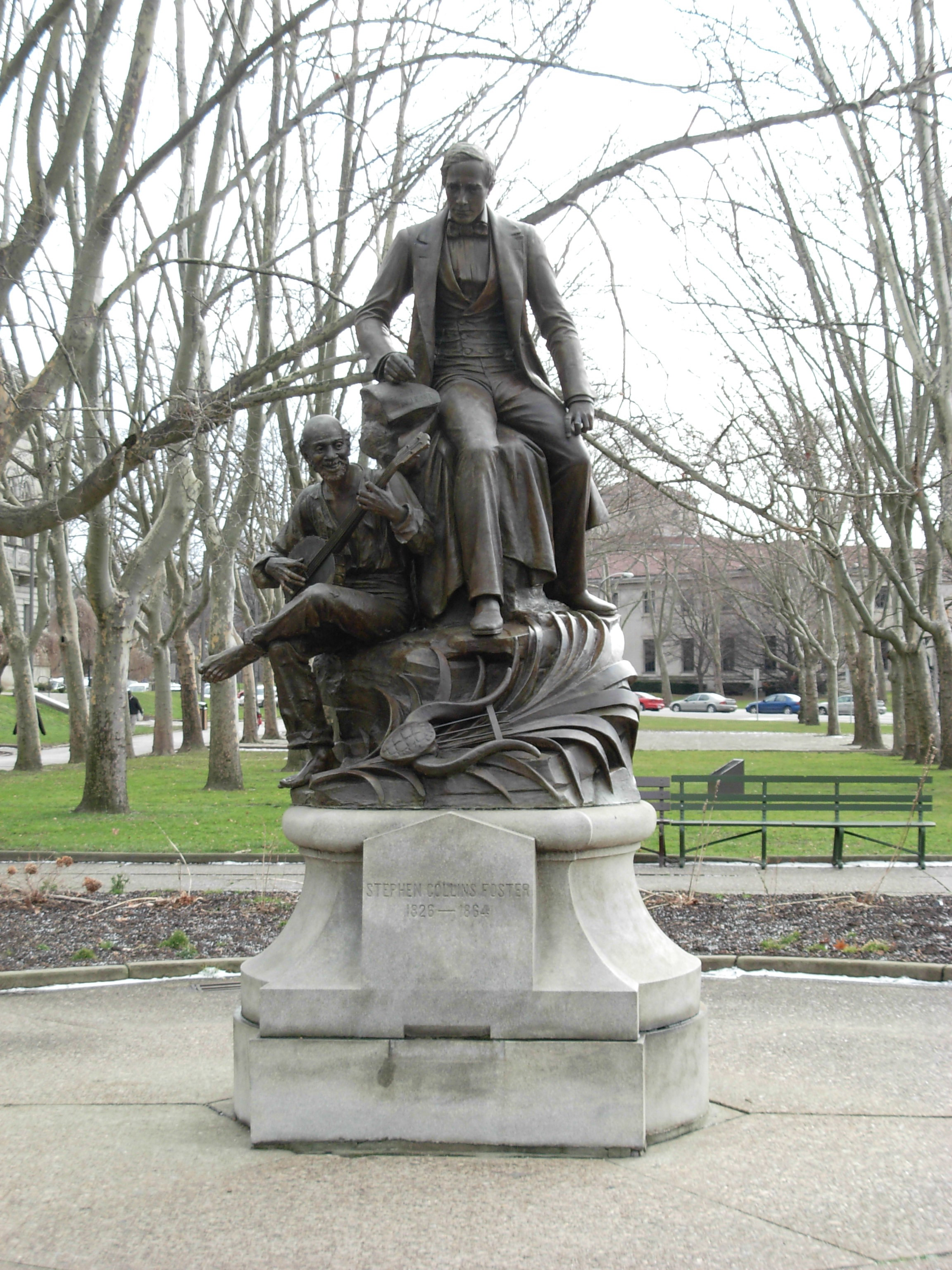
Stephen Foster sculpture, 1900, on Schenley Plaza in the Oakland neighborhood of Pittsburgh, Pennsylvania.

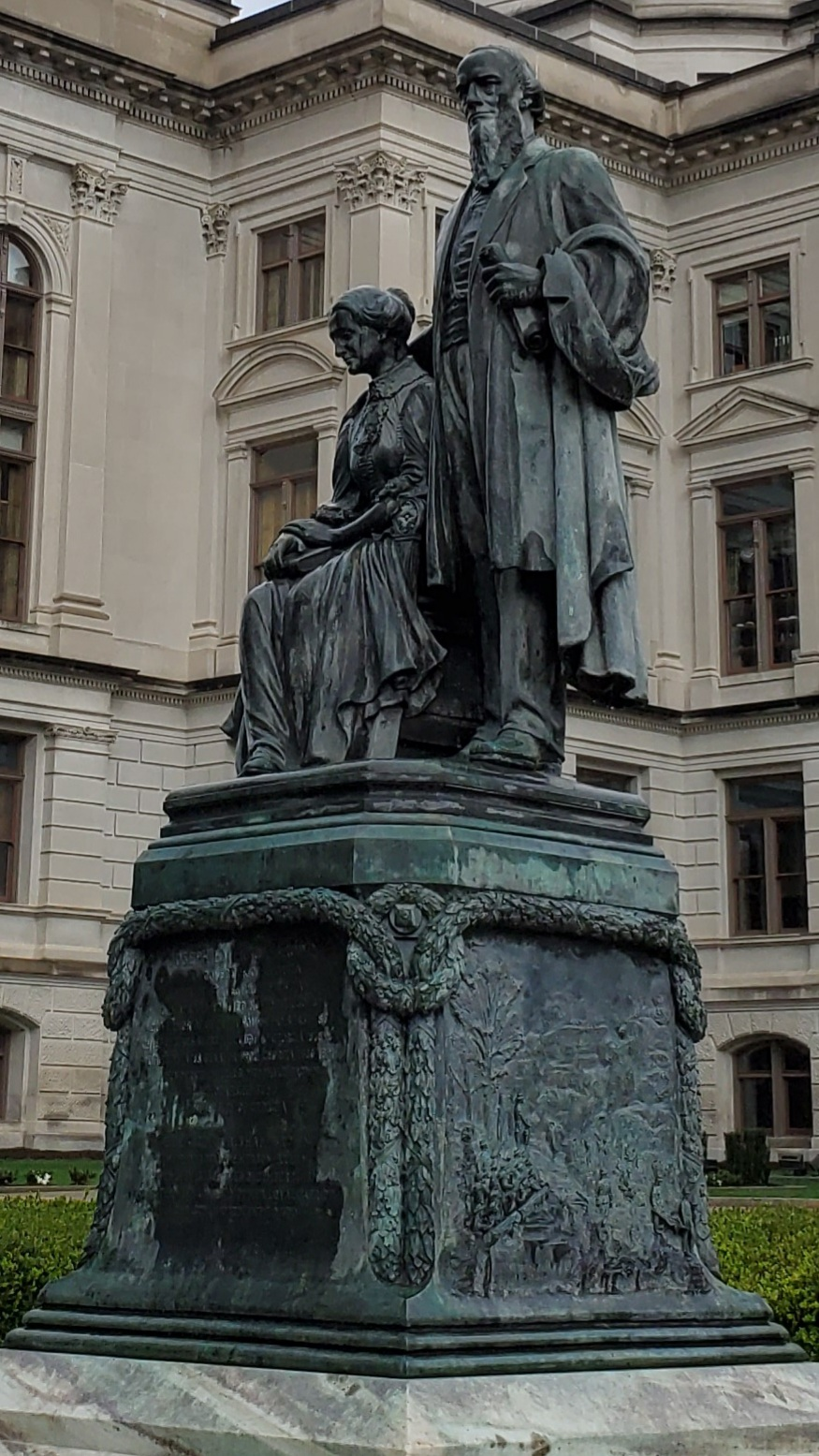
Statue of Elizabeth and Joseph E. Brown, 1928, Atlanta
