= Statue of Elizabeth and Joseph E. Brown =

Monument in Atlanta, Georgia, United States

Joseph Emerson and Elizabeth Grisham Brown
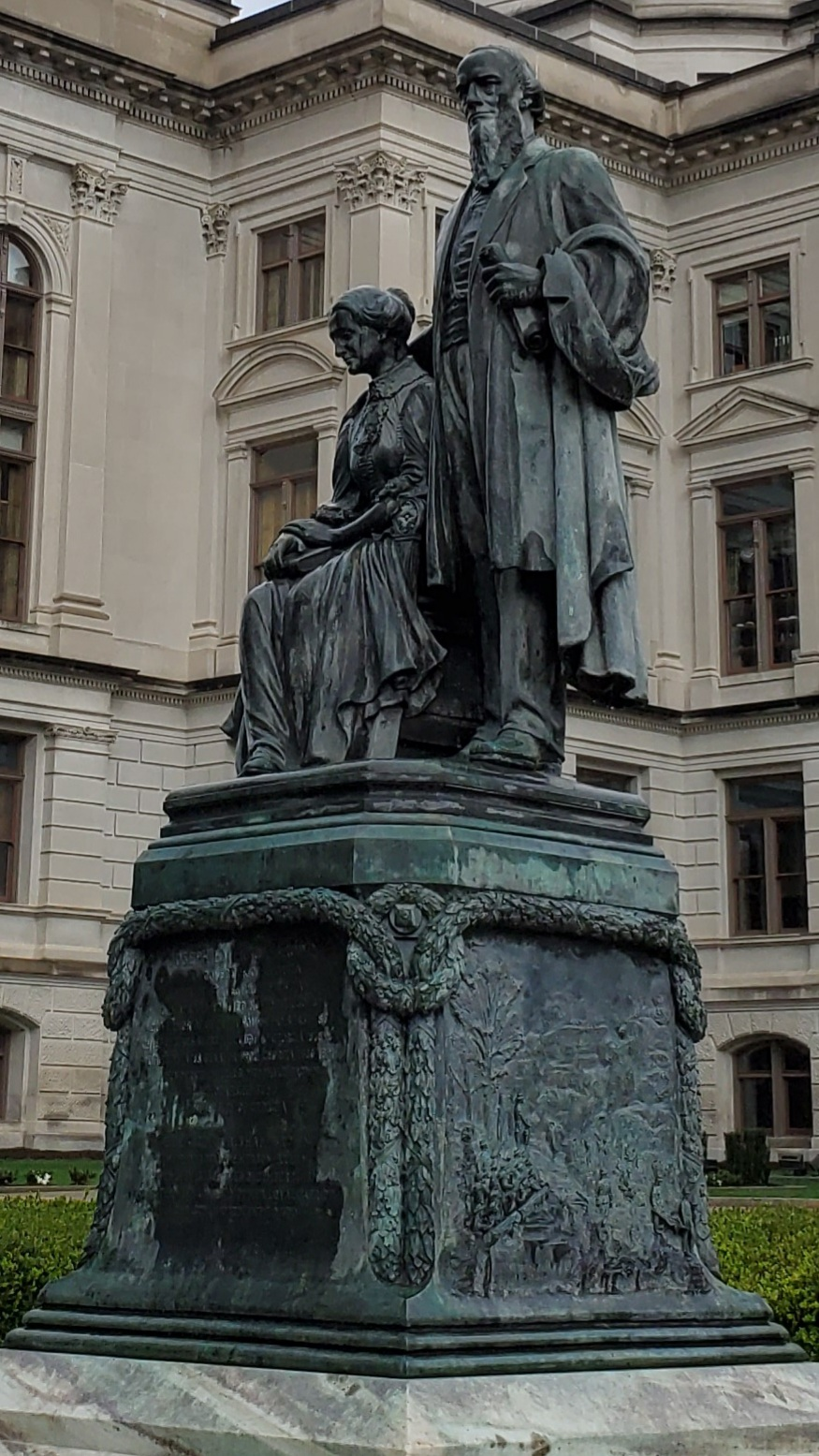
- The statue in 2020, with the Georgia State Capitol in the background
- Interactive map of Joseph Emerson and Elizabeth Grisham Brown
- Location: Georgia State Capitol, Atlanta, Georgia, United States
- Coordinates: 33°44′56.5″N 84°23′20.5″W
- Designer: Giuseppe Moretti (assisted by I. D. Dumley)
- Type: Statue
- Material: Bronze (statue); Marble (base)
- Length: Sculpture: 5 feet (1.5 m); Base: 20 feet (6.1 m)
- Width: Sculpture: 37 inches (94 cm); Base: 20 feet (6.1 m)
- Height: Sculpture: 7 feet 7 inches (2.31 m); Base: 2 feet 6 inches (0.76 m)
- Dedicated date: October 27, 1928
- Dedicated to: Joseph E. Brown and Elizabeth Brown

Joseph Emerson and Elizabeth Grisham Brown is a bronze statue on the grounds of the Georgia State Capitol in Atlanta, Georgia, United States. The monument was designed by sculptor Giuseppe Moretti and depicts Joseph E. Brown, a governor of Georgia, and his wife, Elizabeth Grisham. It was dedicated in 1928.

== History ==
Joseph E. Brown was an American politician who was active during the 19th century. He served multiple terms as the governor of Georgia, as well as a member of the United States Senate from Georgia and as a chief justice for the Supreme Court of Georgia. In 1861, Brown helped to coordinate the state's secession from the United States, and he served as governor during the American Civil War. As a politician, he supported racial segregation and voter suppression that targeted African Americans. Additionally, he was a supporter of the Ku Klux Klan. He died in 1894. In the early 20th century, his son, Joseph Mackey Brown, served for several years as governor.

Another of Brown's sons, Julius E., allocated funds for the creation of a public monument honoring his father and mother, Elizabeth Grisham, in his will. In 1925, the Georgia General Assembly accepted the offer, allowing a statue to be erected on the grounds of the Georgia State Capitol. In their acceptance, the legislature gave the executor of Julius's estate control over the design and erection of the monument. A commission for the monument was won by sculptor Giuseppe Moretti, who had previously designed the Vulcan statue in Birmingham, Alabama. Moretti was assisted in his work on the piece by I. D. Dumley. The monument was one of two to be approved by the General Assembly for erection on the capitol grounds in the 1920s, alongside a statue of Thomas E. Watson. (Note: Due to fundraising issues, the statue of Thomas E. Watson would not be dedicated until 1932.)

The monument was dedicated on October 27, 1928, in a ceremony attended by Joseph Mackey. At the time of its unveiling, it was the second major monument located on the capitol grounds, after an equestrian statue of John Brown Gordon that had been dedicated in 1907.

In 1993, the monument was surveyed as part of the Save Outdoor Sculpture! program. As of 2023, the monument features the only full-body statue of an actual woman on the capitol grounds.

== Design ==
The monument, located to the southwest of the capitol building, consists of a bronze sculpture atop a marble platform. The sculpture is 7 feet 7 inches (2.31 meters) tall and has area measurements of 5 ft (1.5 m) by 37 in (0.94 m). The base has a height of 2 ft 6 in (0.76 m) and covers a square area with side measurements of 20 ft (6.1 m). The sculpture features Elizabeth seated in a chair with a tall backrest. She has a book in her lap, with the hands folded on top. To her left is Joseph, standing, with his right hand on her shoulders. He is holding a scroll in his right hand. Joseph is wearing a suit, with a coat draped over his arm, while Elizabeth is wearing a shawl.

The sculpture features a signature from the sculptor ("G. Moretti") and engravings on the bronze base depicting the Seal of Georgia and scenes from the Battle of Dug Gap and the Battle of Kennesaw Mountain. Another side includes biographical information on Elizabeth and Joseph.

=== Gallery ===
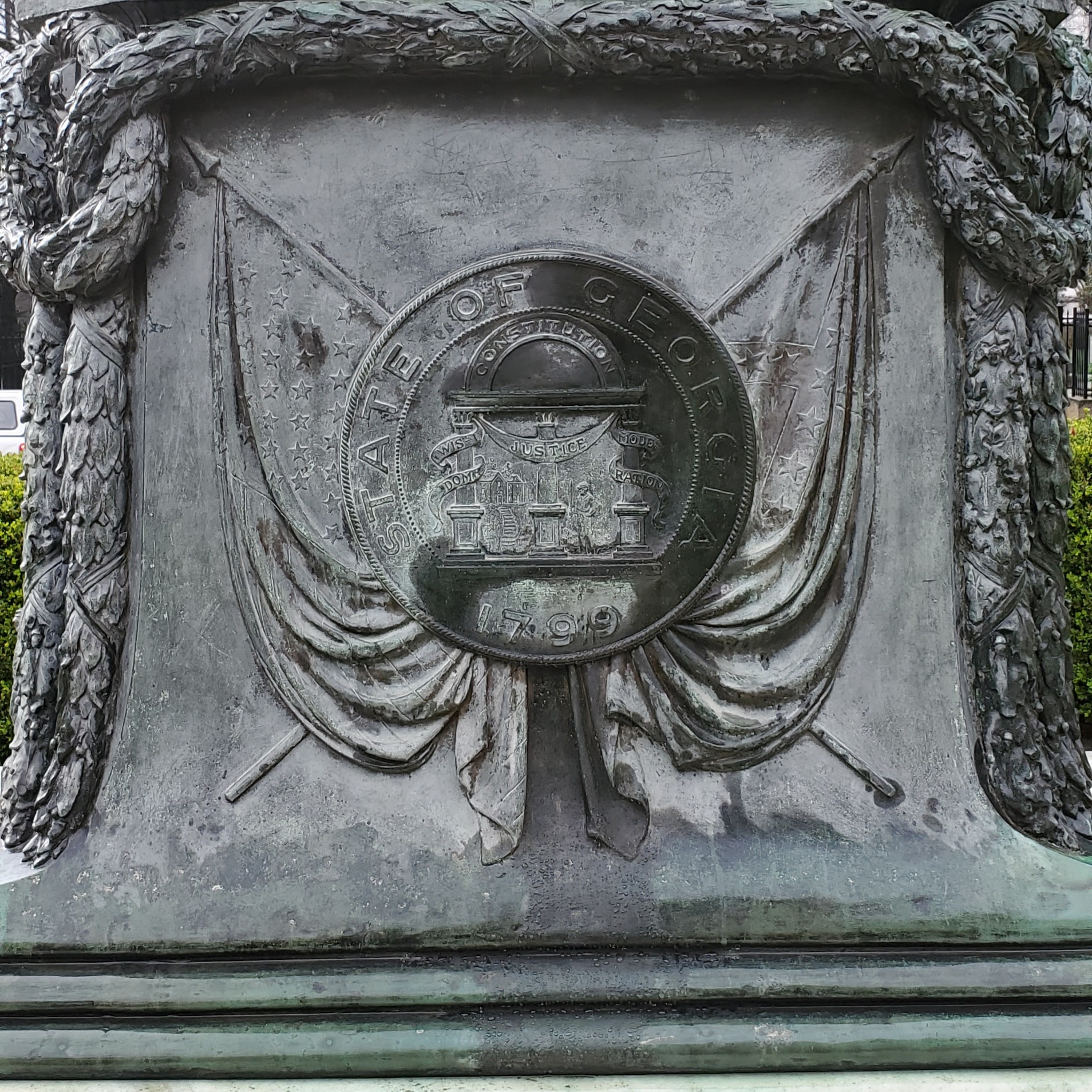
Seal of Georgia

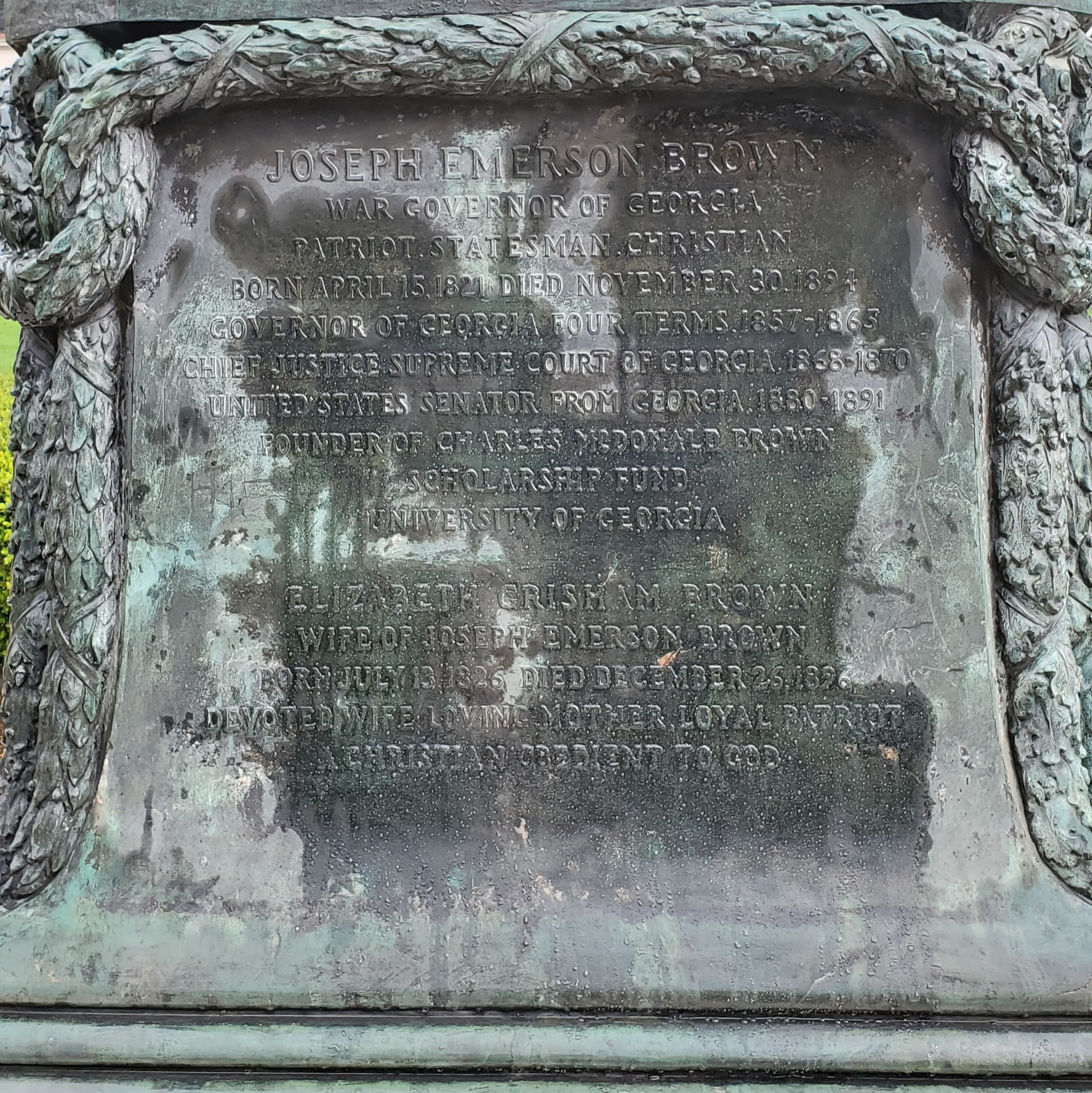
Biography of Joseph and Elizabeth

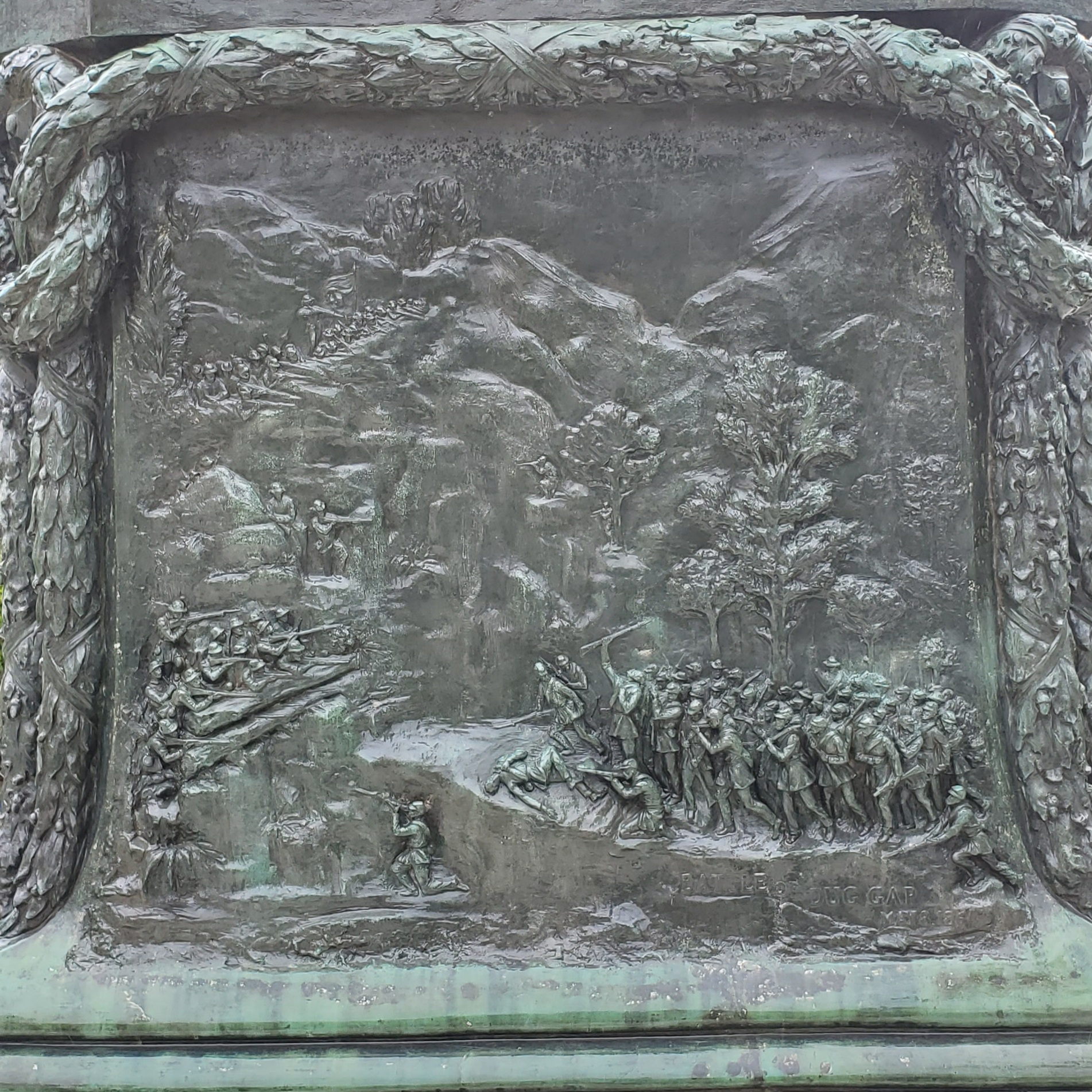
Battle of Dug Gap

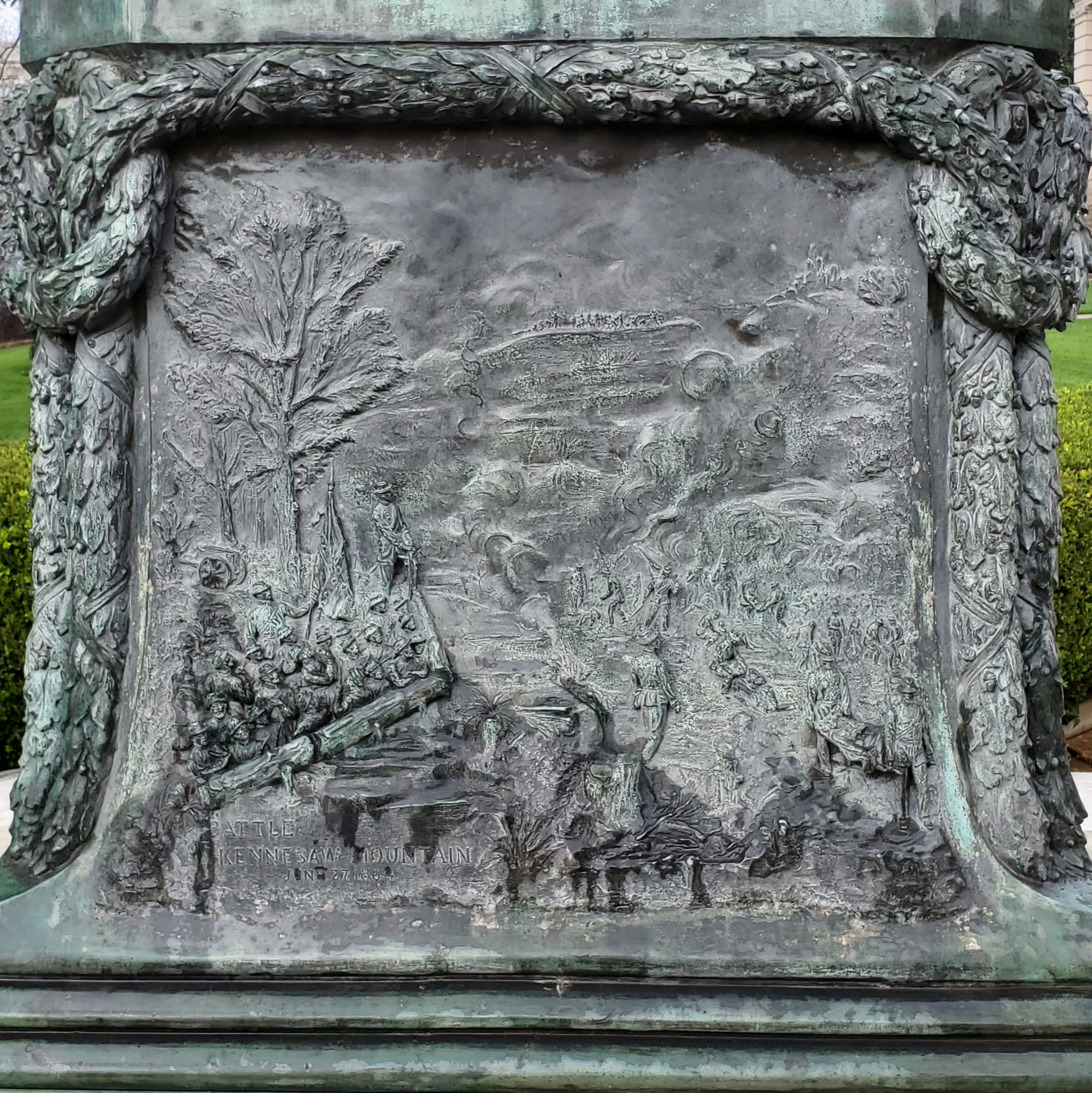
Battle of Kennesaw Mountain

=== Analysis ===
In an analysis of the work in a 2015 book, art historian Deborah C. Pollack notes that the book in Elizabeth's lap represents knowledge and may be a Bible, as her biography on the sculpture's base references her Christian religion. Additionally, she says that the scroll in Joseph's hand is a symbol of the law and that the coat over his arm may be an allusion to the portrayal of statesmen in Roman sculpture, who were sometimes depicted with a toga over an arm. Pollack also said that Moretti completed the sculpture fairly quickly, commenting, "The speed with which Moretti worked belies the statue's fine detail."

== See also ==
- 1928 in art
- List of Confederate monuments and memorials in Georgia
- List of public art in Atlanta

== Sources ==
- Craig, Robert M. "Georgia State Capitol". SAH Archipedia. Society of Architectural Historians. Archived from the original on May 24, 2025.
- Crimmins, Timothy J.; Farrisee, Anne H. (2007). Democracy Restored: A History of the Georgia State Capitol. Photographs by Diane Kirkland. Athens, Georgia: University of Georgia Press. ISBN 978-0-8203-2911-6. LCCN 2006023754. OCLC 70823074.
- Earnest, Darlene (August 25, 2017). "Monuments To White Supremacist Men Dominate Ga. Capitol Grounds". WABE. Archived from the original on October 9, 2024.
- Hurt, Emma (March 13, 2023). "Where are the statues of women at the Georgia Capitol?". Axios. Cox Enterprises. Archived from the original on March 13, 2023.
- Pollack, Deborah C. (2015). "Atlanta: New South Brilliance Ascending from Embers of Civil War". Visual Art and the Urban Evolution of the New South. Columbia, South Carolina: University of South Carolina Press. pp. 11–62. ISBN 978-1-61117-432-8. LCCN 2014023117. OCLC 881592281.
- "Joseph Emerson and Elizabeth Grisham Brown, (sculpture)". Smithsonian Institution Research Information System. Archived from the original on July 25, 2026.
- Wheeler, Kenneth H. (2021). Modern Cronies: Southern Industrialism from Gold Rush to Convict Labor, 1829–1894. Athens, Georgia: University of Georgia Press. ISBN 978-0-8203-5750-8. LCCN 2020034685. OCLC 1183398741.
