= Panthers of Pittsburgh =

Mascot of the University of Pittsburgh

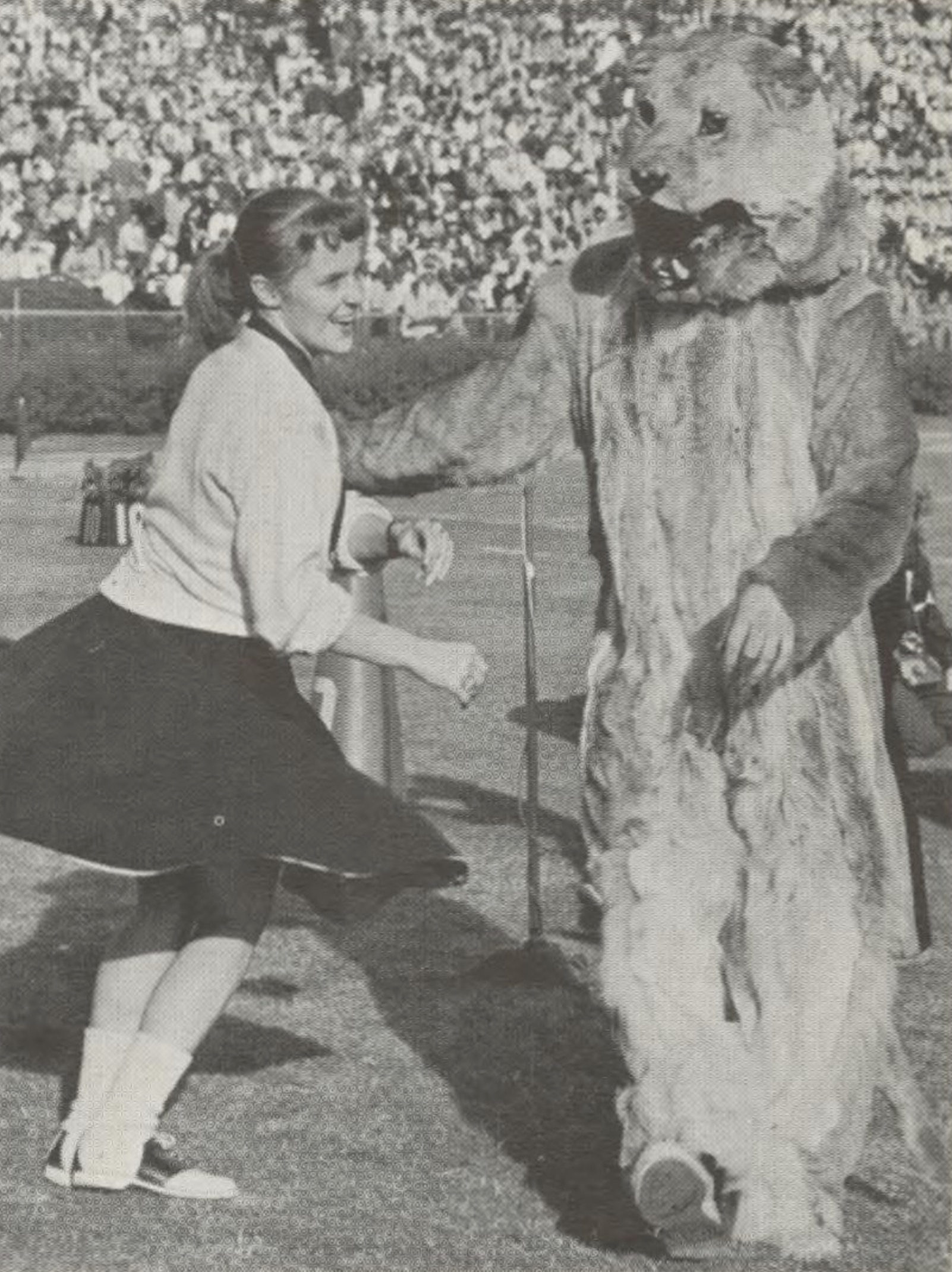
Cheerleader with "the Pitt Panther" at the 1956 Sugar Bowl.

A panther (cougar/Puma concolor) is the animal that serves as the official mascot of the University of Pittsburgh and used as a nickname for both athletic teams as well as other organizations and affiliates of the university. The mascot is generally referred to as the Pittsburgh Panther or Pitt Panther, while the costumed panther mascot is also named "Roc". Up to 20 physical representations of panthers can be found in and around the university's campus and athletic facilities.

== History ==
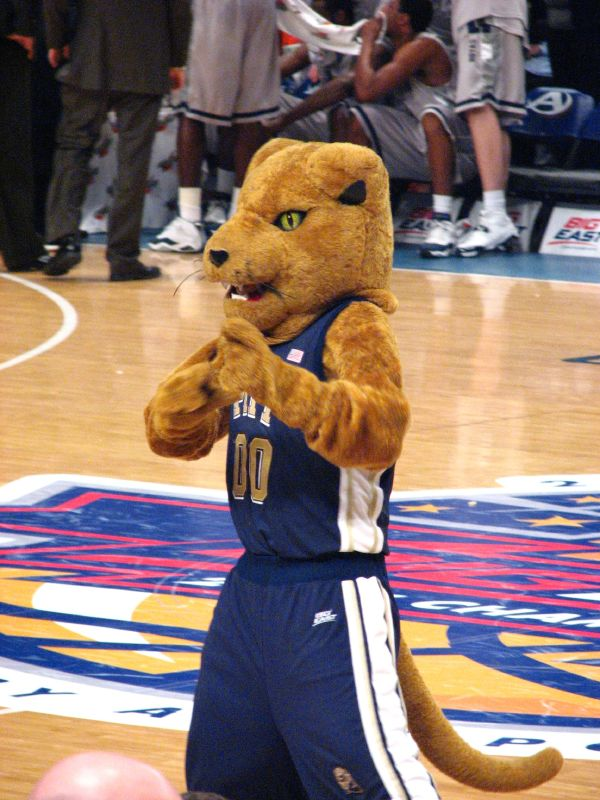
"Roc" the Panther costumed mascot, 2007

The University of Pittsburgh adopted the Panther as its official animal and mascot on November 16, 1909 at a meeting of students and alumni. This adoption occurred shortly after the university, previously known as the Western University of Pennsylvania, obtained an alteration to its charter in the summer of 1908 in order to change its name to the University of Pittsburgh. When named the Western University of Pennsylvania, the university had been referred to by the nickname of "Wup" (pronounced Whup) and athletic teams referred to as the "Wups", a play on the school's abbreviation W.U.P. At this time, the university also began the process of moving from what is now Pittsburgh's North Side to its current location in the Oakland section of Pittsburgh. According to George M. P. Baird (class of 1909), who made the suggestion for the Panther as the university's mascot, the reasons it was chosen were:

1. The Panther was the most formidable creature once indigenous to the Pittsburgh region.
2. It had ancient, heraldic standing as a noble animal.
3. The happy accident of alliteration.
4. The close approximation of its hue to the old gold of the University's colors (old gold and blue), hence its easy adaptability in decoration.

A costumed Panther character has made appearances at University of Pittsburgh athletic events for decades. Although the Panther costume has changed over time, the mascot was nicknamed "Roc" in 1990s to honor Steve Petro, former football player, assistant coach, athletic department assistant, and long-time fan, whose nickname from his playing days under Jock Sutherland was "the Rock". The Panther mascot appears at various university events, both athletic and other.

== Statues and other representations ==
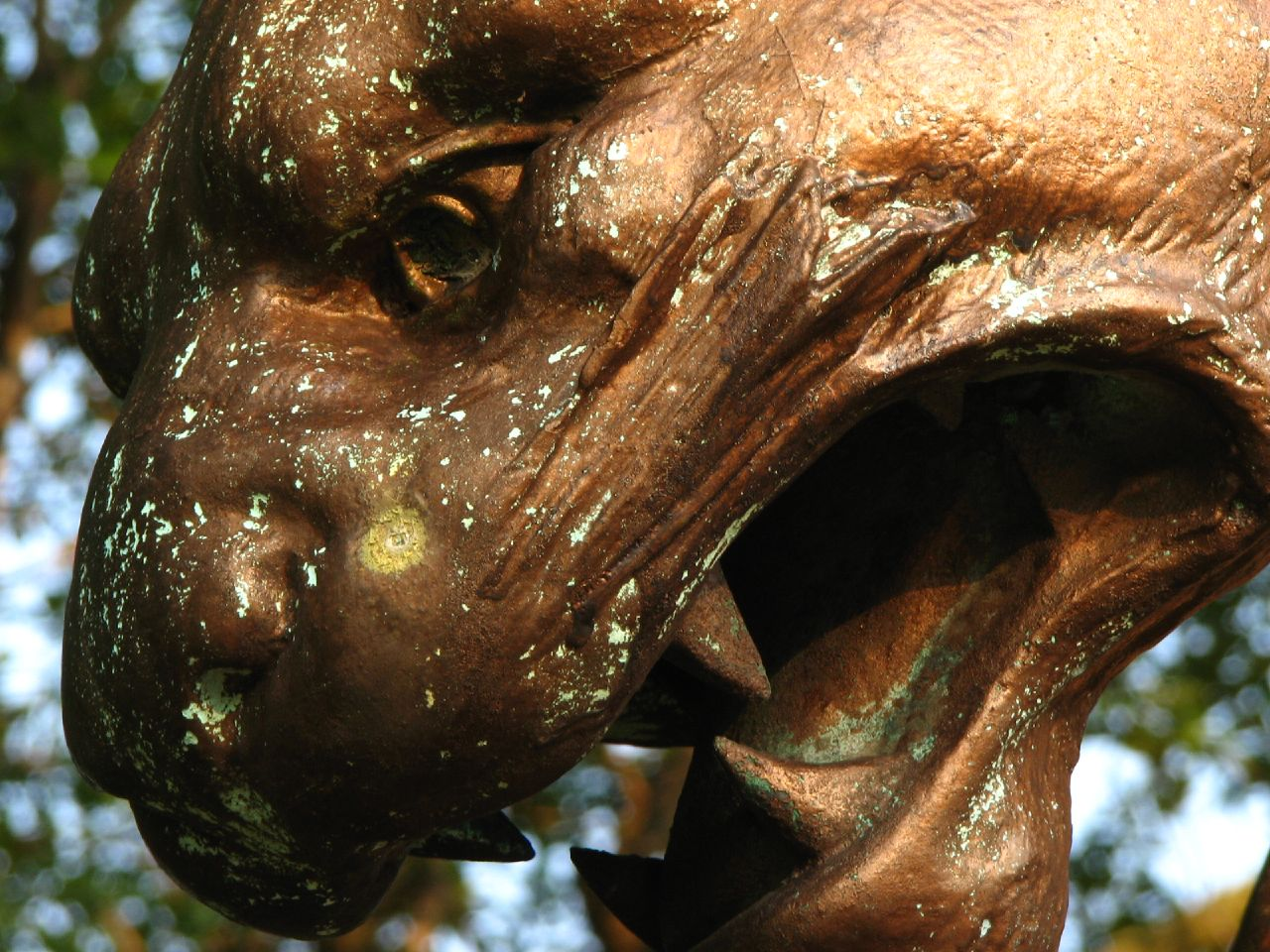
Detail of one of Moretti's Panther statues

There are 20 representations of Panthers (cougars) in and about Pitt's campus, including ten painted fiberglass panthers decorated by various student groups that are placed around the campus by the Pitt Student Government. The oldest representations of panthers are four Panther statues that guard each corner of the Panther Hollow Bridge. Other Oakland locations include both inside and in front of the William Pitt Union, outside the Petersen Events Center, "Pitt the Panther" on the carousel in Schenley Plaza, the Panther head fountain on the front of the Cathedral of Learning, and the Pitt Panther statue outside Heinz Field on Pittsburgh's North Shore. This does not include the large image of a Panther embedded into Litchfield Towers Fifth Avenue entrance plaza pavers (best seen from high above) or the panther depicted in a neon artwork "Tree of Knowledge" by Jane Haskell inside the William Pitt Union.

=== Panther Hollow Bridge Panthers ===
Giuseppe Moretti's (1859–1935) four cast bronze Panther statues created in 1897 guard each corner of Panther Hollow Bridge in Schenley Park adjacent to the Pitt campus. Panthers were once found abundantly throughout the region and became to symbolize it. These statues, and Panther Hollow, existed prior to the university's move by 1909 to Oakland which includes the neighborhood of Panther Hollow adjacent to the school's campus. Moretti's Panther statues soon became adopted representations of the university and of the Pittsburgh Panthers and became a popular photographic site for visitors and students of the university and were widely used in university and student publications. Representations of Moretti statues were also used in university logos. At one time, painting or defacing the Moretti sculptures was a popular form of vandalism committed by the fans of rival universities prior to the schools' football games.

=== William Pitt Union Moretti Panther ===
The Panther Fountain in front of the Cathedral of Learning.

An 1897 panther sculpture by Giuseppe Moretti, the same artist who sculpted the Panther Hollow Panthers, sits inside a paneled wood case in the Tansky Family Lounge on the first floor of the William Pitt Union.

=== Panther Fountain ===
A panther head spews water in this fountain located at the base of the Cathedral of Learning, which was constructed from 1926-1937. Joseph Gattoni did the Cathedral's stone work, although no information is available on whether he specifically worked on the fountain.

=== Millennium Panther ===
This Panther outside the William Pitt Union is ten-and-a-half-feet long and was cast with a sleek and muscular tone in pure bronze by sculptor Miriani Guido in Parma, Italy. With one paw poised in the air, the panther is designed to appear ready to pounce on an unsuspecting enemy. The statue arrived on campus in May 2001 and was stored over the summer in a University warehouse until placed outside the William Pitt Union at the end of August 2001. A time capsule to be opened in the year 2051 was buried beneath the statue. The project, a gift to the university from the Student Government Board to commemorate the beginning of the 3rd millennium, began with deliberations in April 1999, cost $72,000 ($62,000 plus a $10,000 base), the most student government has ever spent on one project up until that time.

The plaque on the statue reads

The Pitt Panther Dedicated August 31, 2001 with the belief that scholarship,
integrity and the unyielding spirit of our past will carry us
into the new millennium and beyond.

A gift from the 1999 Student Body

George J. Mongell
President, Student Government

Mark A. Nordenberg
Chancellor

Students, alumni, and fans rub the nose of the Millennium Panther in order to bring good luck to the university's teams prior to athletic contests. This tradition was featured in a national television advertisement for the 2012 Hyundai Tucson automobile.

=== Panther outside Acrisure Stadium ===
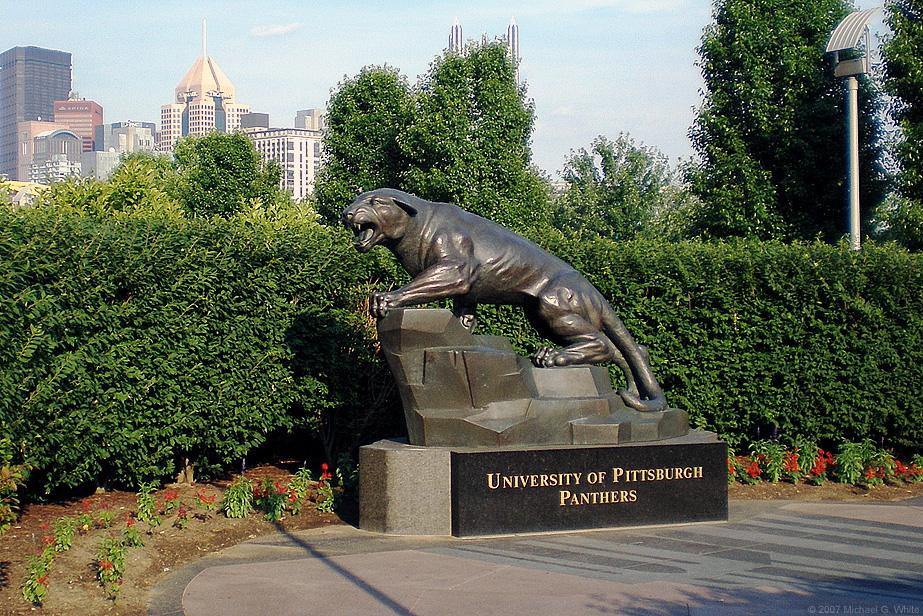
Panther outside Heinz Field across from downtown Pittsburgh

This Panther sits outside Gate A of Acrisure Stadium across the Allegheny River from downtown Pittsburgh. It is based on the design by Thomas N. Mitrakos, who played football for The University of Pittsburgh and the Pittsburgh Steelers, for the award for the Pitt Varsity Letter Club Awardees of Distinction. Dedicated on September 6, 2002. The statue, 12 feet (3.7 m) long is set on a granite base. Paved in the stone around the base is an image of the Cathedral of Learning. The statue was made possible by a donation from Charles “Corky” (ENGR ’58) and Frances M. (CAS ‘58) Cost.

=== Panther outside the Pete ===
This Panther sits at the main entrance of the Petersen Events Center. Similar to the Panther outside Heinz Field, it is based on the design by Thomas N. Mitrakos for the award for the Pitt Varsity Letter Club Awardees of Distinction. Paving stones surrounding the nine-foot-long panther are etched with images of the former Pitt Stadium. The retired jerseys of Panther football greats, including Mike Ditka, Tony Dorsett, Dan Marino, Hugh Green, and Bill Fralic, are carved into the panther's base. The statue was made possible by a donation from Charles “Corky” (ENGR ’58) and Frances M. (CAS ‘58) Cost, who also donated the panther statue at Heinz Field.

=== Pitt the Panther ===
"Pitt the Panther" on the carousel at Schenley Plaza adjacent to Pitt.

“Pitt the Panther”, adopted by Henry and Linda Haller, is one of the animals on a Victorian-style carousel, opened in 2006 and built by Chance Rides Manufacturing of Wichita, Kansas, and funded by the PNC Financial Services Group. It holds 20 people, on 15 1950s-style animals or in a handicapped-accessible chariot and a spinning tub suitable for small children and their parents. The carousel is Schenley Plaza’s feature family attraction and the menagerie of animals, including "Pitt the Panther", symbolizes the fellowship and diversity of Pittsburgh. However, it is not the first carousel in Schenley Park. In 1913 the original Schenley Park Carousel was opened to the public at the corner of Panther Hollow and Greenfield roads. The original carousel also had a menagerie of animals. The PNC Carousel in Schenley Plaza operates April through October and is open seven days a week.

=== Homecoming Panthers ===
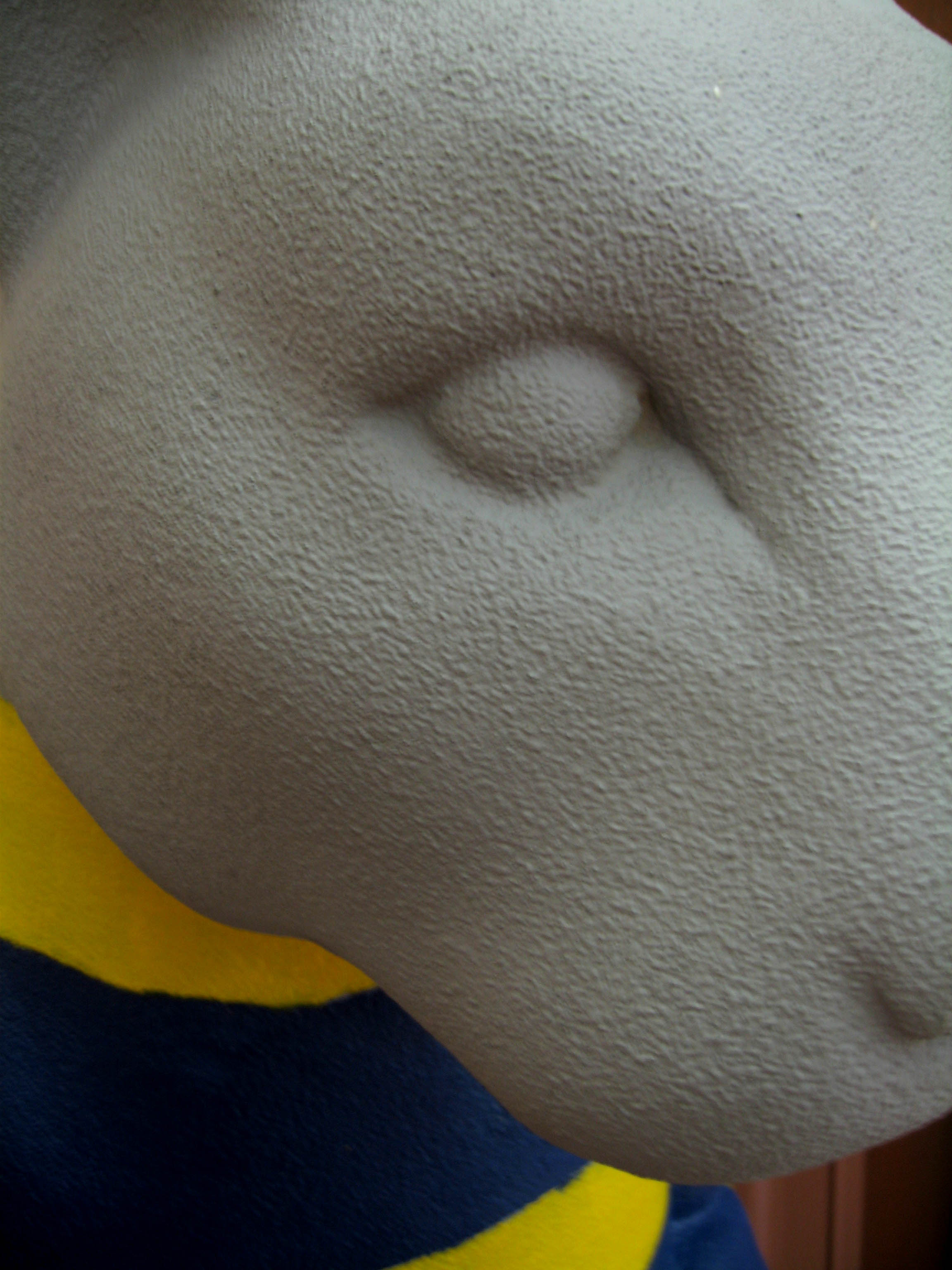
The Pitt Pathfinders' Homecoming Panther located on the Pitt's campus

In order to create a new homecoming tradition, the Pitt Student Government board purchased ten fiberglass panther statues in 2007 for $60,000 from Heavy Industries of Calgary, Canada. Proposed to be an annual homecoming event, the approximately 6 feet (1.8 m) tall by 6 feet (1.8 m) wide panthers are to repainted and redecorated by student organizations that will be selected from applications on an annual basis. Originally planned for a 2007 homecoming introduction, manufacturing delays prevented initial decoration and first unveiling until a ceremony on January 10, 2008. Following the ceremony, the panthers were placed in and around Pitt's campus. In a Fall 2008 article of The Pitt News, it was announced that the statues decorated by the Black Action Society, The Pitt News, the Pitt Pathfinders, and the Pitt Band would be spared another year due to their designs. Both The Pitt News and the Pitt Pathfinders have paid to have their panther statues kept permanently in their respective locations, while the Pitt Band is attempting to raise money to purchase its panther in time for its centennial in 2011.

== Gallery ==
One of four Panther statues on Panther Hollow Bridge, this one closest to Phipps Conservatory & Botanical Gardens.

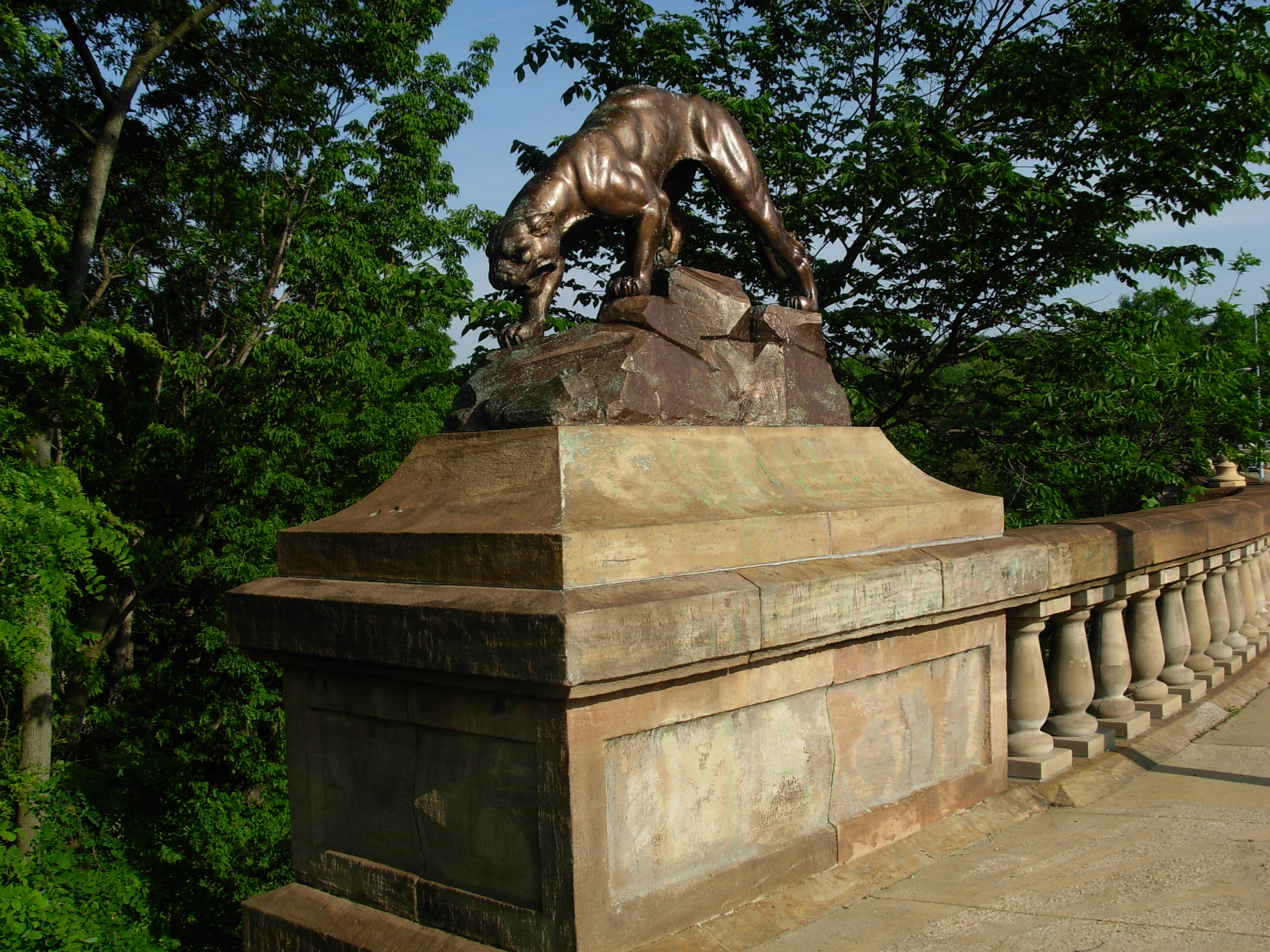
Another of the four Panther statues

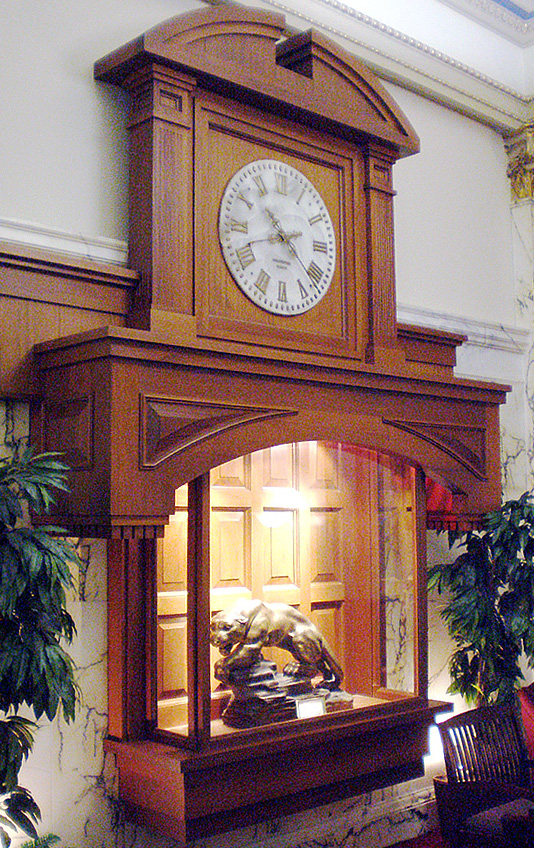
A Moretti sculptured Panther on display inside the William Pitt Union.

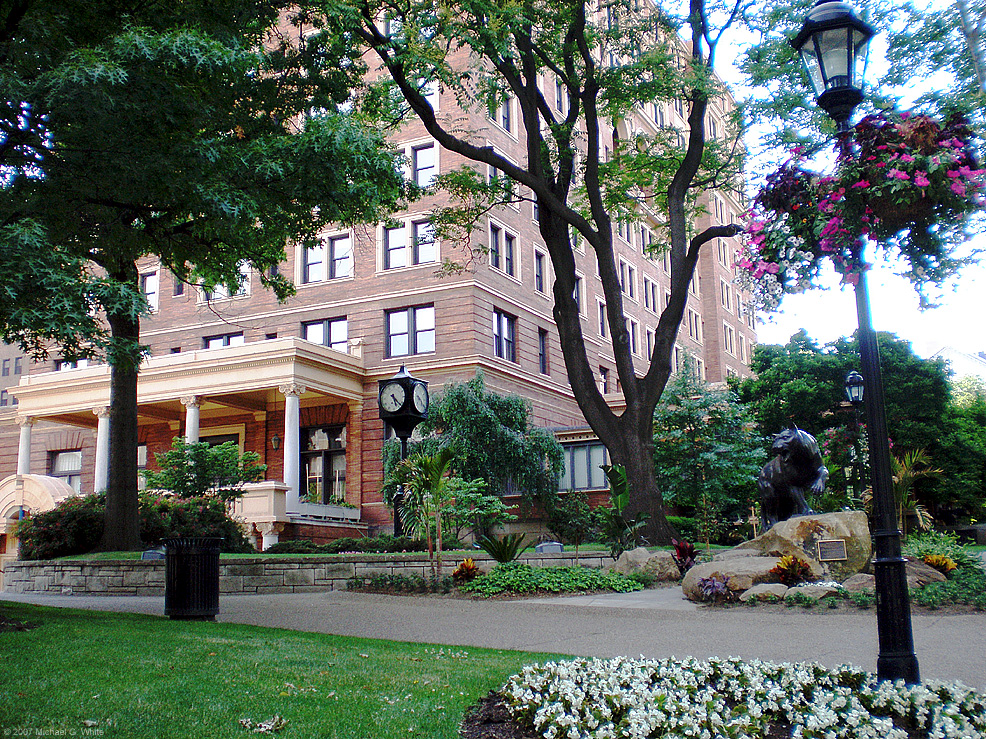
The Millennium Panther by the William Pitt Union

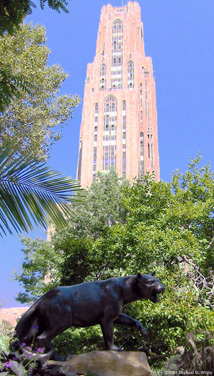
Millennium Panther in front of the Cathedral

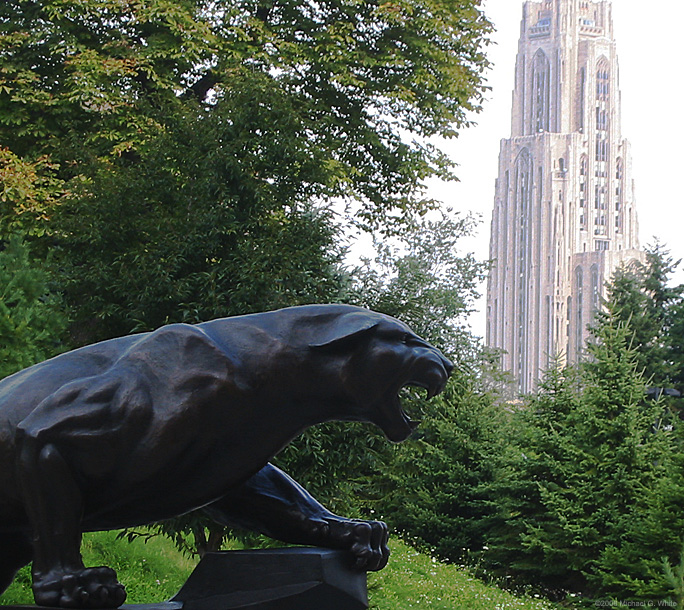
Petersen Events Center Panther

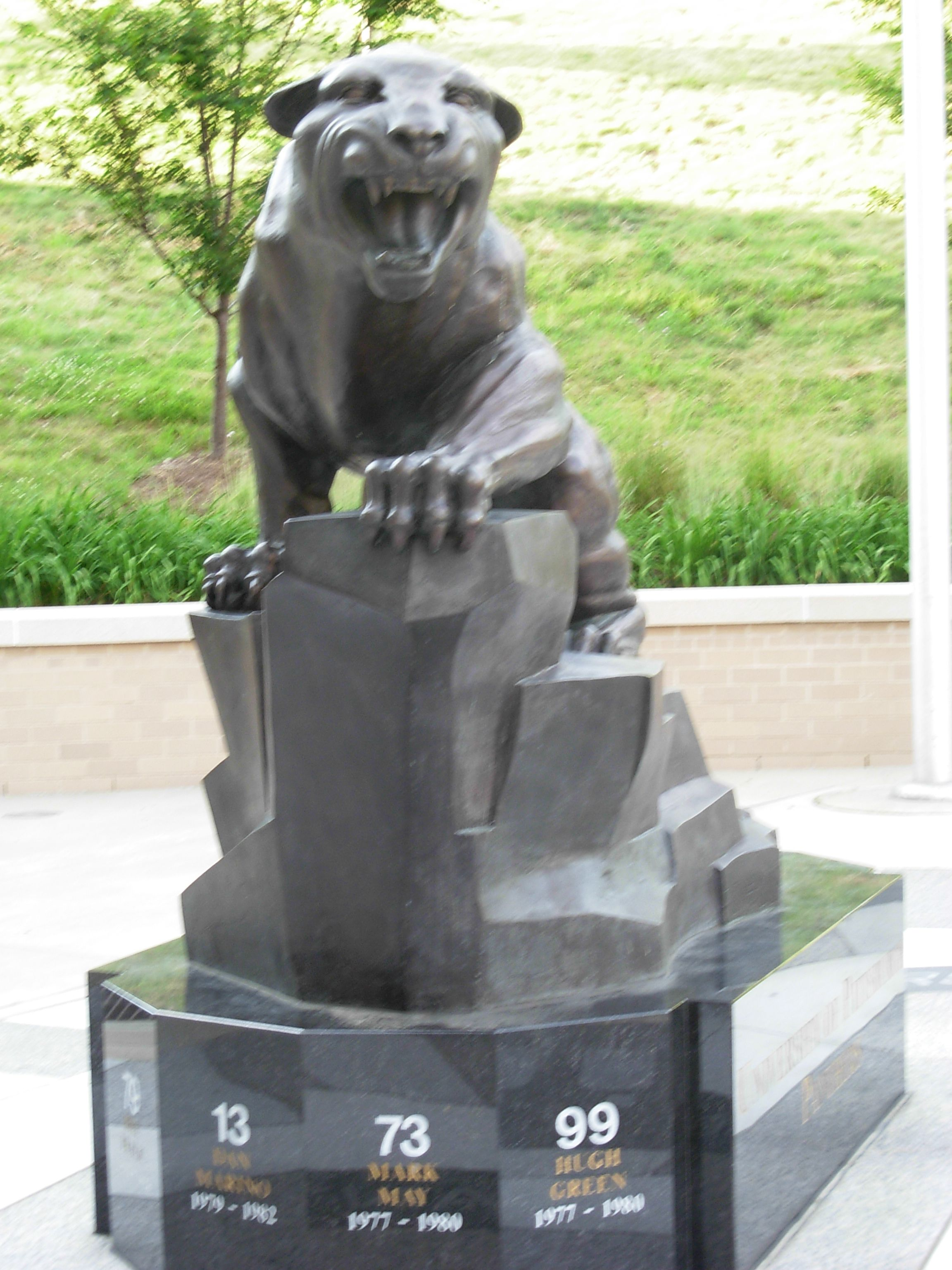
Head on view of the Pete's Panther
