= List of blackface minstrel songs =

This is a list of songs that either originated in blackface minstrelsy or are otherwise closely associated with that tradition. Songwriters and publication dates are given where known.

== A ==
- "Abraham Lincoln Jones", Cecil Mack and Chris Smith (1909)
- "Alabama Joe" (a.k.a. "Shall Trelawney Die") (before 1855)
- "Angelina Baker" (1850)
- "The Arkansas Traveler" (c. 1862)

== B ==
- "Babylon Is Fallen", Henry Clay Work (1863)
- "Back Side of Albany"
- "The Band of Niggers! From 'Ole Virginny State'" (1844)
- "The Bee-Gum", G. Willig (1833)
- "Billy Patterson", Dan Emmett (1860)
- "The Black Brigade", Dan Emmett (1863)
- "Blue Tail Fly" (a.k.a. "Jimmy Crack Corn") c. 1846
- "The Boatman's Dance", credited to Dan Emmett (1843) (Emmett, Boston, 1840s or 1842) (Nathan 131–2, 186, 191, 193, 320–3)
- "Bonja Song" (c. 1820)
- "Bowery Gals" (a.k.a. "As I Was Lumbering")
- "Bress Dat Lubly Yaller Gal"
- "Briggs' Breakdown", Z. Bacchus
- "Buckley's Sleighing Song", A. Sedgwick (1853)

== C ==
- "Camptown Races", Stephen Foster, (1850)
- "Can't Yo' Heah Me Callin' Caroline", Caro Roma (1914)
- "Carry Me Back to Old Virginny" James A. Bland, (1878)
- "Charleston Gals" (1844)
- "Ching a Ring Chaw"
- "Claire de Kitchen", performed as early as 1832 by T. D. Rice and George Washington Dixon
- "Clar de Track", 1840s.
- "Clem Titus' Jig", published by Dan Emmett
- "Coal Black Rose" (c. 1829)
- "The Colored Croquette", James Lord Pierpont (1853)
- "Come Back Stephen"/"Come Back Steben"
- "Cornfield Green"
- "Cynthia Sue"

== D ==
- "Dandy Broadway Swell", (1849)
- "Dandy Jim from Caroline" (and variants), Dan Emmett (c. 1844)
- "Dar He Goes! Dats Him!", Dan Emmett (1844)
- "Dere Be Any Malted Licker Here?"
- "Darkey Money Musk" (a.k.a. "Money Must", "Holyrood or Moneymusk", "Sir Archibald Grant of Monymusk's Reel"), Daniel Dow (1780)
- "Darkies' Pastime"
- "Darktown Strutters' Ball, Shelton Brooks (1917)
- "Dearest May"
- "Dick Myers' Jig", published by Dan Emmett
- "Dinah's Wedding Day"
- "Division Street Jig", Z. Bacchus
- "Dixie" (a.k.a. "Dixie's Land", "I Wish I Was in Dixie"), Dan Emmett contested, 1859
- "Do Fare You Well Ladies" (1840s)
- "Do I Do I Don't Do Nothing" (1825)
- "Don't bet your money on de Shanghai", Stephen Foster (1861)
- "Dr. Hekok Jig", Z. Bacchus, published by Dan Emmett(Nathan 200, 203, 208, 486–7)

== E ==
- "Eelam Moore Jig", Dan Emmett (before 1854)
- "Effects of the Brogue", (a.k.a. "Tatter Jack") Dan Emmett (by 1861)

== F ==
- "Far [Fare] You Well Ladies"
- "Farewell My Lilly Dear", Stephen Foster (1851)
- "The Fine Old Color'd Gentleman", Dan Emmett (1843)
- "De Floating Scow Quickstep" (a.k.a. "Oh Carry Me Back to Old Virginny"*), E. Ferrett (1847)
- "Forty Hosses in de Stable", J. Kierman (1840s)
- "The Free Nigger", sung by R. W. Pelham (1841)

== G ==
- "Gantz's Jig", published by Dan Emmett
- "Genuine Negro Jig", published by Dan Emmett
- "Gentle Annie", Stephen Foster (1856)
- "Geraldine", James Lord Pierpont (1854)
- "Gentle Nettie Moore/The Little White Cottage", James Lord Pierpont (1857)
- "Get along Home, Cindy", possibly developed from a minstrel tune "Cindy Lou"
- The Glendy Burk, Stephen Foster (1860)
- "Ginger Blue" (1841)
- "Grape Vine Twist"
- "Gonna Eat Ma Chicken 'Til I'm Fried"
- "Gray Goose and Gander"
- "Guinea Maid"
- "Gumbo Chaff" (a.k.a. "Gombo Chaff"), early 1830s
- "Gwine to de Mill", Jay R. Jenkins (1846)

== H ==
- Hand Me Down My Walking Cane, James A. Bland (1880)
- "Happy Are We Darkies So Gay"
- "Hard Times", Tom Briggs (1855)
- "Hell on the Wabash Jig"
- "High Daddy", Dan Emmett (1863)
- "Hop Light, Loo", Dan Emmett (before 1854)
- "Hot Corn"

== I ==
- "I Ain't Got Time to Tarry" (a.k.a. "The Land of Freedom"), Dan Emmett (1858)
- "I'm Going Home to Dixie", Dan Emmett (1861)
- "I'm Gwine ober de Mountain", Dan Emmett (1843)
- "I Saw the Beam in My Sister's Eye"
- "If Money Talks, It Ain't On Speaking Terms With Me", J. Fred Helf (1902)
- "Ireland and Virginia"

== J ==
- "Jack on the Green", Dan Emmett
- "James Crow", Sam Carusi (1832)
- "Jenny Get Your Hoe Cake Done", popularized by Joel Sweeney (1840)
- "Jim Along Josey", credited to "an Eminent professor" and performed by John N. Smith (1840)
- "Jim Brown" (1835)
- "Johnny Boker or De Broken Yoke in de Coaling Ground" (1840)
- "Johnny Roach", Dan Emmett (1859)
- "Jolly Raftsman"
- "Jordan Is a Hard Road to Travel", Dan Emmett (1853)
- "The Jolly Raftsman"
- "Juba"
- "Juber" (1840s)
- "Jumbo Jum" (1840)
- "Jump Jim Crow", (c. 1823, popularized by T.D. Rice in 1828)
- "Just Because She Made Dem Goo-Goo Eyes", Hughie Cannon (1900)

== K ==
- "Kingdom Coming" (a.k.a. "Year of Jubilo"), Henry Clay Work (1862)
- "Kitty Crow", James Lord Pierpont (1853)

== L ==
- "Land of Canaan", played by J. Simmons (before 1860)
- "A Life by the Galley Fire"
- "De Long Island Nigger", Emma Snow (?) (c. 1848)
- "Long Time Ago", John Cole (1833)
- "Loozyanna Low Grounds", Dan Emmett (1859)
- “Lucy Long” (see http://utc.iath.virginia.edu/minstrel/lucylongfr.html)
- "Lucy Neal"/"Lucy Neale" J. P. Carter (1844)
- "Lynchburg Town"

== M ==
- "Marty Inglehart Jig", Dan Emmett (1845)
- "Mary Blane" (a.k.a. "Mary Blain"), Billy Whitlock (1846)
- "Massa Is a Stingy Man" (1841)
- "Merry Sleigh Bells"
- "The Merry Sleigh Ride, Valentine Dister (1852)
- "Mighty Lak' a Rose", Ethelbert Nevin (1901)
- "Miss Lucy Long" (a.k.a. "Lucy Long", "Miss Lucy Song"), Dan Emmett and Frank Brower (1844), or Billy Whitlock (1842) or possibly Billy Whitlock (1838)
- "Moze Haymar Jig", Dan Emmett (1845)
- "My Old Kentucky Home", Stephen Foster (1853)
- "My First Jig", Dan Emmett (c. 1840s)
- "My Long Tail Blue" (1830s)
- "My Old Aunt Sally" (1843)
- "My Old Dad"/"Old Dad" (1844)

== N ==
- "Negro Jig", Dan Emmett (1845)
- "Nelly Was a Lady", Stephen Foster (1849)
- "New York Gals", Emma Snow?
- "The Newton Jig", James Buckley (1860)
- "Nigga General"
- "Nigger on de Wood Pile", Dan Emmett (1845)

== O ==
- "(O Lud Gals) Gib Me [Us] Chaw Terbakur", words by Dan Emmett (1843)
- "Oh, Come along John" a.k.a. "Walk along John" (1843)
- "Oh, Dem Golden Slippers, James A. Bland (1879)
- "Oh, Ladies All!", Dan Emmett (published 1858, probably written in the 1840s)
- "Oh Lemuel", Stephen Foster (1850)
- "Oh! Susanna", Stephen Foster (1847)
- "Old Aunt Jemima, Billy Kersands (1875)
- "Old Black Joe, Stephen Foster (1860)
- "Old Bob Ridley", Charles White (1855)
- "Old Dan Tucker", words by Dan Emmett (1843)
- "Old Folks at Home", Stephen Foster (1851)
- "Old Joe", F. M. Brower (1844)
- "Old Joe Golden"
- "Old Johnny Boker"
- "Old King Crow"
- "Old K. Y. Ky.", Dan Emmett (1860)
- "Old Tar River"/Ole Tare River" (1840)
- "Old Uncle Ned", Stephen Foster (1848)
- "Ole Bull and Old Dan Tucker" (1844)
- "The Ole Grey Goose" (1844)
- "De Ole Jawbone" (and variants), perhaps Joel Sweeney (1840)
- "Ole Pee Dee", J. P. Carter (1844)
- "Ole Virginny Break Down" (1841)
- "The One Horse Open Sleigh", (a.k.a. "Jingle Bells") James Lord Pierpont (1857)
- "Joe Sweeney's Jig", published by Dan Emmett
- "Owl Creek Quickstep", Dan Emmett

== P ==
- "Pea Patch Jig", Dan Emmett
- "Peel's Jig"
- "Peter Story Jig", Dan Emmett
- "Philadelphia Gals"
- "Philisee Charcoal"
- "Picayune Butler (Ahoo! Ahoo!)"
- "Picayune Butler's Come to Town" (before 1847)
- "Polly Wolly Doodle", credited to Dan Emmett, (1843/1878/1880)
- "Poor Elsie", James Lord Pierpont (1854)
- "Poor Uncle Tom", A. Sedgwick (1852)
- "Possum up the Gum-Tree"

== Q ==
- "Quaker's Jig", R. Myers

== R ==
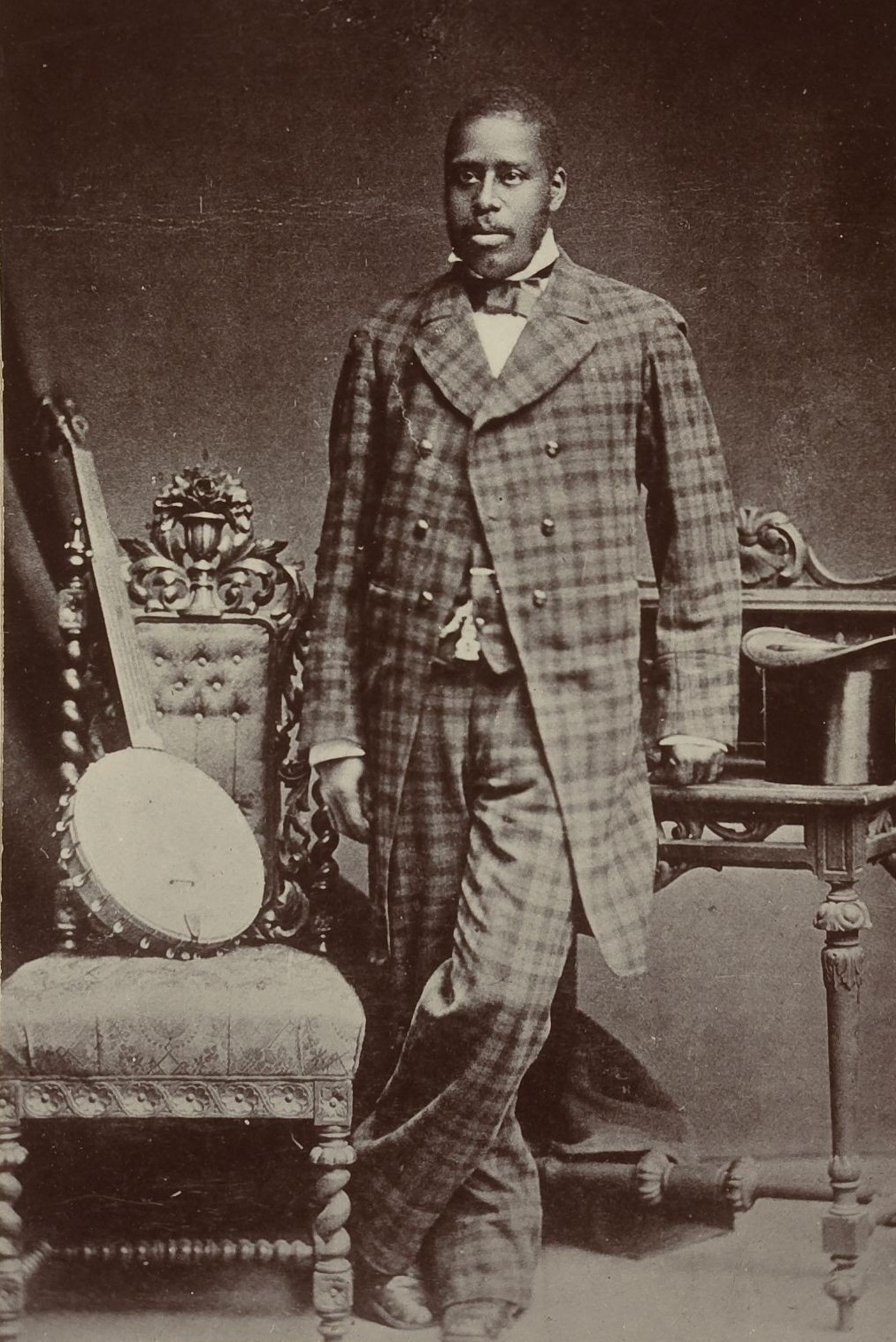
Horace Weston

- "Ring, Ring de Banjo", Stephen Foster (1851)
- "Ring the Bell, Fanny", James Lord Pierpont (1854)
- "Rise Old Napper"
- "Road to Richmond", Dan Emmett (1864)
- "Rob Ridley", Charles White (1855)
- "Rock Susana", Horace Weston (1887)
- "Roll Out! Heave Dat Cotton", William Shakespeare Hays (1877)
- "Root, Hog or Die", Dan Emmett (c. late 1840s or early 1850s)
- "Rosa Lee"

== S ==
- "Sad to Leave Our Tater Land" (early 1850s)
- "Sam Johnson's Colored Cake Walk", Dave Braham (1883)
- "Sandy Boy", possibly Phil Rice (before 1858)
- "Sandy Gibson's", Dan Emmett (1859)
- "Seely Simpkins Jig", Dan Emmett
- "Settin' on a Rail" (1836)
- "Shoo Fly, Don't Bother Me" (1869)
- "Sich a Gettin' Up Stairs" (c. 1834)
- "Singing Darkey of the Ohio"
- "Skeeters Do Bite"
- "Sliding Jenny Jig", R. Myers
- "Someone in de House wif Dinah", possibly Phil Rice (before 1858)
- "Stop Dat Knocking", A. F. Winnemore (1847)
- "Sugar Cane Green"
- "Sugar in a Gourd"
- "Suke of Tennessee"
- "Susey Brown"/"Suzy Brown"
- "Sweep Oh!"

== T ==
- "Tell Me Josey Whar You Bin" (1840)
- "There'll Be a Hot Time in the Old Town Tonight, Theodore A. Metz (1896)
- "To the Cornfields Away"
- "Tom Brigg's Jig", published by Dan Emmett
- "Turkey in the Straw", developed from Zip Coon (1861)
- "Twelfth Street Rag", Euday L. Bowman (1898/1914/1919)
- "Twill Nebber Do to Gib It up So", Dan Emmett (1843)

== U ==
- "Uncle Gabriel" (1848)

== V ==
- "Van Bramer's Jig", published by Dan Emmett
- "Virginia's Lubly Ground"

== W ==
- "Walk Along John" (1843)
- "Walk Jaw Bone" (c. 1840)
- "Walking for dat Cake", Dave Braham (1877)
- "Wait for the Wagon", Geo P. Knauff (1851)
- "Westchester Nigga Song"
- "Whar Did You Come From?" (subtitled "Knock a Nigger Down"), performed by Joel Sweeney (1840)
- "Whar Is de Spot We Were Born?"
- "What O' Dat", Dan Emmett (1859)
- "Whoop Jamboree Jig"
- "Who's Dat Knocking"
- "Who's Dat Nigga Dar a Peepin" (1844)
- "Wide Awake" a.k.a. "Dar's a Darkey in de Tent", Dan Emmett (early 1859)
- "[In de/In the] Wild Raccoon Track"
- "De Wild Goose-Nation", Dan Emmett (1844)
- "(Won't You Come Home) Bill Bailey", Hughie Cannon (1902)

== Y ==
- "Yellow Corn"

== Z ==
- "Zip Coon" (a.k.a. "Old Zip Coon"), performed by George Washington Dixon (1829? 1835?)

== See also ==
- Hokum
- Coon song
- Minstrel show
