= Northern Light (Jon Christos album) =

Northern Light is the debut album from classical musician and Salford born tenor Jon Christos. The album was released in 2005 by Roots Music Group and produced by Alan Gregson peaked at number 9 in the official UK classical album charts. The album is a collection of new classical crossover songs as composed by Matteo Saggese, James Shearman, Sam Babbenia, Rick Guard and Phil Rice along with well established arias and songs such as; Nessun Dorma, "Caruso", Ch'ella mi creda and Non ti scordar di me.

== Track listing ==
1. Suspiro por ti
2. "Caruso"
3. Non ti scordar di me
4. Immenso Sogno
5. Shadow
6. Did you ever
7. All or Nothing
8. Tutto sei per me
9. Ch'ella mi creda
10. I'll Walk with God
11. Forever and ever
12. Jubilate Domum
13. Nessun Dorma
14. O Holy Night
