= Wintermute =

Wintermute may refer to:

== People ==
- H. Ogden Wintermute (1895–1964) American writer and historian
- Marjorie Wintermute (1919–2007) American architect
- Slim Wintermute (1917–1977), American basketball player
- Martha Wintermute (1842–1918), American author and poet

== Other uses ==
- An artificial intelligence character in the novel Neuromancer
- Wintermute Engine, a graphical adventure game engine developed by Dead:Code software
- Wintermute, first story mode episode of the video game The Long Dark
- Wintermute Lake, a lake in Minnesota
