= Old Dan Tucker =

Traditional song performed by Virginia Minstrels

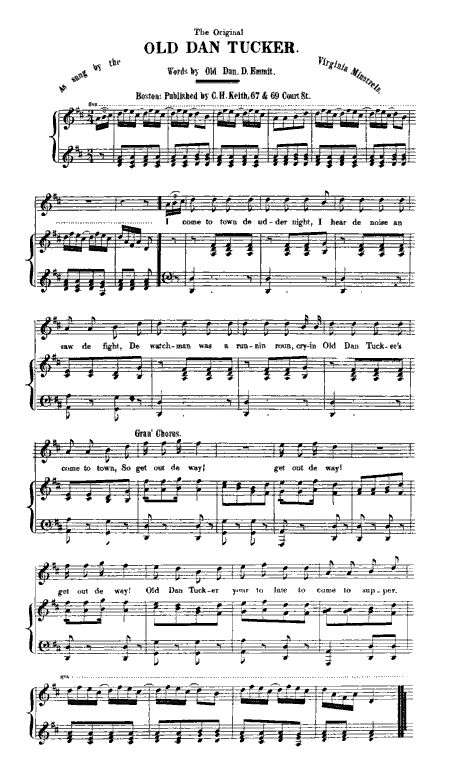
- Sheet music (1843)

Song by Virginia Minstrels
- Published: 1843 by Charles H. Keith
- Genre: Minstrel
- Songwriter: Usually attributed to Daniel Decatur Emmett

"Old Dan Tucker," also known as "Ole Dan Tucker," "Dan Tucker," and other variants, is an American popular song. Its origins remain obscure; the tune may have come from oral tradition, and the words may have been written by songwriter and performer Dan Emmett. The blackface troupe the Virginia Minstrels popularized "Old Dan Tucker" in 1843, and it quickly became a minstrel hit, behind only "Miss Lucy Long" and "Mary Blane" in popularity during the antebellum period. "Old Dan Tucker" entered the folk vernacular around the same time. Today it is a bluegrass and country music standard. It is no. 390 in the Roud Folk Song Index.

The first sheet music edition of "Old Dan Tucker," published in 1843, is a song of boasts and nonsense in the vein of previous minstrel hits such as "Jump Jim Crow" and "Gumbo Chaff." In exaggerated Black Vernacular English, the lyrics tell of Dan Tucker's exploits in a strange town, where he fights, gets drunk, overeats, and breaks other social taboos. Minstrel troupes freely added and removed verses, and folk singers have since added hundreds more. Parodies and political versions are also known.

The song falls into the idiom of previous minstrel music, relying on rhythm and text declamation as its primary motivation. Its melody is simple and the harmony little developed. Nevertheless, contemporary critics found the song more pleasant than previous minstrel fare. Musicologist Dale Cockrell argues that the song represents a transition between early minstrel music and the more European-style songs of minstrelsy's later years.

== Lyrics ==
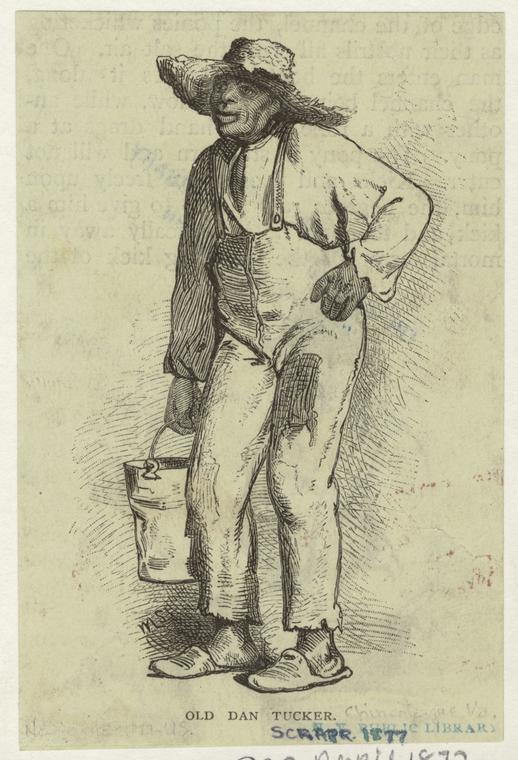
This 1877 illustration from Scribner's Magazine shows the Dan Tucker character as a rural black man.

"Old Dan Tucker" as originally published exemplifies the masculine boasting songs that predominated in early minstrelsy. Modern analysts emphasize the song's rawness, racism, and disdain for social taboos. In ersatz the song uses short, active words such as runnin and cryin, to portray Dan Tucker as a rough-and-ready black man in the mold of Jim Crow, Gumbo Chaff, and ultimately the tall tale frontiersman:

I come to town de udder night,
I hear de noise an saw de fight,
De watchman was a runnin roun,
Cryin Old Dan Tucker's come to town.

Gran' Chorus.

So get out de way! Get out de way!
Get out de way! Old Dan Tucker.
You're too late to come to supper.

Tucker is an animalistic character, driven by sex, violence, and strong drink. He is ugly, unrefined, and unintelligent, even infantilized. As a stranger in town, his devil-may-care actions show his problems with or ambivalence to adapting to local mores. More broadly, Tucker's disdain for social norms allows the song to send up respectable middle class American society, as evidenced by the final verse:

Tucker was a hardened sinner,
He nebber said his grace at dinner;
De ole sow squeel, de pigs did squall
He 'hole hog wid de tail and all.

Other verses appear that do not go along with the main narrative. Their lines seem to be confused jabber, due to the unfamiliar slang and products of the time. Perhaps it was written to extend the rhyme scheme. The third verse is one example:

Here's my razor in good order
Magnum bonum—jis hab bought 'er;
Sheep shell oats, Tucker shell de corn,
I'll shabe you soon as de water get warm.

Dan Tucker is both the teller and subject of the story. Verses 1, 3, and 5 of the 1843 edition are in the first person, whereas verses 2, 4, and 7 are in the third. This reflects the song's intended performance by an entire minstrel troupe. The lead minstrel played Tucker and began the song, but backup singers took over at times to allow Tucker to act out the scenario, dance, and do another comedy bit. There was probably an element of competition to the various dance and music solos. The third-person verses also allowed for commentary to suggest to the audience how they were to judge the character and his antics.

Individual companies probably selectively performed verses from the song or added new ones. For example, the Virginia Serenaders added verses about the Irish, Dutch, and French. At least four versions of the song were published with different lyrics during the 19th century. A parody called "Clar de Track" appears in some playbills and songsters.

=== Folk versions ===
"Old Dan Tucker" entered American folklore soon after it was written. Its simple and malleable nature means that singers may begin or end it at any point or invent new verses on the spot. Hundreds of folk verses have been recorded. This is a common folk variant:

Old Daniel Tucker wuz a mighty man,
He washed his face in a fryin' pan;
Combed his head wid a wagon wheel
And he died wid de toofache in his heel.

A common chorus variant goes:

So, git outa de way for old Dan Tucker,
He's come too late to git his supper.
Supper's over and breakfast cookin',
Old Dan Tucker standin' lookin'.

For decades "Old Dan Tucker" was used as part of a dancing game. The players formed a ring, and one man moved to the center. He selected women to swing around according to the lyrics:

Here's old Dan, he comes to town;
He swings the ladies round and round.
He swings one east, he swings one west,
He swings with the one he loves the best.

The third woman chosen then became his new partner, and her old partner now took the role of "Old Dan".

These folk versions can be quite ribald. This one, recalled by a man from his boyhood in Benton County, Arkansas, in the 1910s, is one example:

Old Dan Tucker was a fine old soul,
Buckskin belly and a rubber ass-hole,
Swallowed a barrel of cider down
And then he shit all over town.

The above version was recorded by Oscar Brand, with addition of the following verses.

Old Dan Tucker climbed a tree
His lord and master for to see
Stuck his pecker in a peckerwood hole
Couldn't get it out to save his soul

Old Dan Tucker come to town
Flopping his pecker up and down
Tucker said "I'm gonna pull my pud
The pussy in this town is no dang good

"Old Dan Tucker" entered the folklore of slaves as well. This version from Orange County, North Carolina, was recorded in the 1850s:

Marster and Missus look' might fine—
Gwine to take a journey, gwine whar dey gwine,
Crab grass a-dyin', red sun in de west,
Saturday's comin', nigger gwine to rest.

It has been suggested that "died with a toothache in his heel" could be a reference to reactive arthritis.

=== Political versions ===
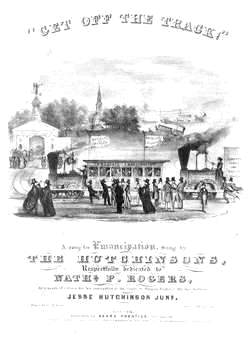
The Hutchinson Family Singers' "Get off the Track!" puts abolitionist lyrics to the tune of "Old Dan Tucker".

The original "Old Dan Tucker" and most folk variants are not political in nature. However, as early as 1844, the Hutchinson Family Singers were performing "Get off the Track!" to its tune, billed as "A song for emancipation" One verse and the chorus say:

Ho! the car Emancipation
Rides majestic thro' our nation,
Bearing on its train the story;
Liberty! a nation's glory.

Get out the way! Every station!
Freedom's car, Emancipation!

That same year, supporters of Henry Clay at a Whig rally sang a version that makes references to Clay ("Ole Kentucky"), Martin Van Buren, and James Buchanan:

The people's fav'rite, Henry Clay, is now the 'fashion' of the day;
And let the track be dry or mucky, we'll stake our pile on Ole Kentucky.

Get out of the way, he's swift and lucky; clear the track for Ole Kentucky!

Another Clay version has the following lyrics (which also has the advantage of explaining the pronunciation of Clay's vice presidential candidate):

Hurrah, hurrah, the country's risin'
For Henry Clay and Frelinghuysen.
Hurrah, hurrah, the country's risin'
For Henry Clay and Frelinghuysen.

In 1856, supporters of John C. Frémont's run for the Republican Party nomination adopted the tune as his campaign song with the changed refrain "Get out the way, old Buchanan". William Jennings Bryan's campaign song for the 1900 Democratic National Convention in Kansas City, Missouri, changed the lyrics to say:

Voters, come and hear my ditty,
What was done at Kansas City:
David Hill, the New York lion,
Nominated Billy Bryan.

Get out of the way, you Grand Old Party,
You're so old, you're getting warty.

A version popular during the American Civil War adds references to Abraham Lincoln:

Old Abe is coming down to fight,
And put the Democrats to flight;
He's coming with the wedge and maul
And he will split 'em one and all.

Get out the way, you little giant
You can't come in, you're too short and pliant.

== Structure ==
"Old Dan Tucker" is a breakdown, a dance song wherein the rhythmic accent falls on the second and fourth beats rather than on the third. The song is largely Anglo-American in nature, although it has black influences. Its repetitive melodic idiom matches that of earlier minstrel standards, such as "Jump Jim Crow," "Coal Black Rose," and "Old Zip Coon."

The song consists of 28 bars. It begins with a boisterous eight-bar introduction. Four bars follow to frame the coda. The remainder consists of sixteen bars with lyrics, half devoted to verse, and half to refrain. Each phrase gives way directly to the next with no rests between sections.

Rhythm is perhaps the most important component of "Old Dan Tucker." It begins with a cadenced introduction and little melody. Even when the tune begins in earnest, it is flat and non-harmonized and does little more than provide a beat on which words are uttered. The refrain is syncopated in a way that had only previously been used in the minstrel song "Old Zip Coon". The intense rhythm on the line "Get out the way!" generates a forward momentum and is answered by instruments in one example of the song's black-influenced call and response.

"Old Dan Tucker" was, of course, intended for stage performance. The verses are not only to be played but also acted out and danced to. Minstrels could begin leaping about at the introduction and coda, beginning the full music at the vocal section. Performers probably included instrumental versions of the chorus while they played, a rare practice in early minstrelsy.

Musicologist Dale Cockrell argues that "Old Dan Tucker" represents a bridge between the percussive blackface songs of the 1830s and the more refined compositions of songwriters such as Stephen Foster. Cockrell says that, unlike previous minstrel songs, "Old Dan Tucker" is meant for more than just dancing; its tune is developed enough to stand on its own. Contemporary critics certainly noticed the difference. Y. S. Nathanson called it "the best of what I have denominated the ancient negro ballads. The melody is far superior to anything that had preceded it." Nathanson compared the song to works by Gaetano Donizetti and Daniel Auber.

== Composition ==
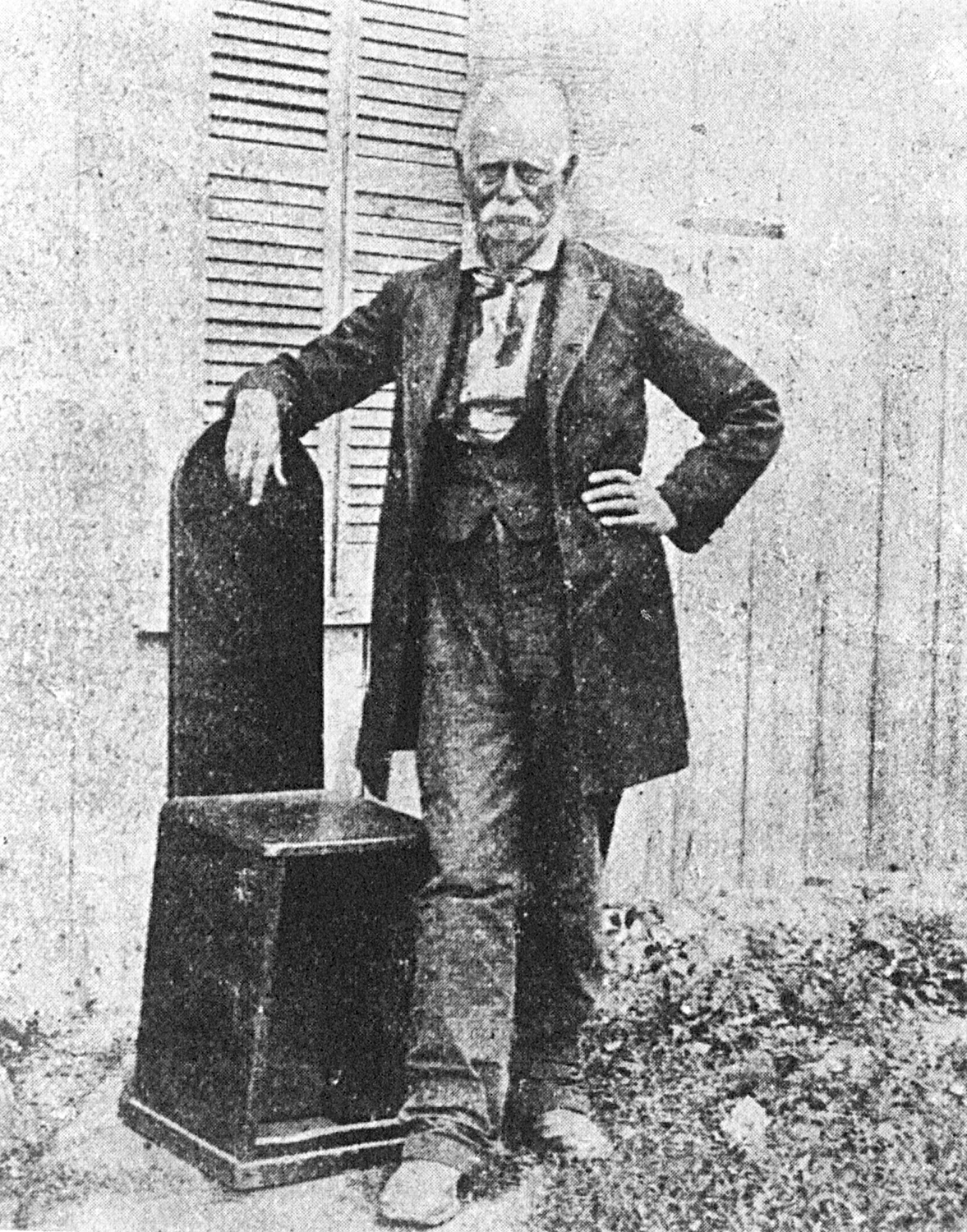
Dan Emmett said that he wrote "Old Dan Tucker" while a boy in Mount Vernon, Ohio, where he retired in his later years.

The origin of the music of "Old Dan Tucker" has always been obscure, and no sheet music edition from 1843, the year of its first publication, names a composer. The first performance of the tune (but not lyrics) may have happened as early as 1841. The song has been alleged to refer to the notorious Daniel Tucker (1575-1625) of Jamestown Colony, Virginia, and Bermuda. The music may be from the oral tradition or may have been a product of collaboration.

"Old Dan Tucker" has been credited to at least three different songwriters: Dan Emmett, J. R. Jenkins, and Henry Russell. In his old age, Emmett related the traditional story to his biographer, H. Ogden Wintermute: "I composed Old Dan Tucker in 1830 or 1831, when I was fifteen or sixteen years old." The biography says that Emmett first played the song in public at a performance by a group of traveling entertainers. They lacked a fiddle player, and the local innkeeper suggested young Emmett to fill in. Emmett played "Old Dan Tucker" to the troupe manager's liking, and he debuted on the Mount Vernon, Ohio village green in blackface to perform the song on the Fourth of July. Wintermute says that the name Dan Tucker is a combination of Emmett's own name and that of his dog. However, there is no evidence for any of this. Instead, Emmett may merely have written the words. Even these seem to partially derive from an earlier minstrel song called "Walk Along John" or "Oh, Come Along John", first published in various songsters in the early 1840s. Some verses have clear echoes in versions of "Old Dan Tucker":

Johnny law on de rail road track,
He tied de engine on his back;
He pair's his corn wid a rail road wheel,
It gib 'em de tooth ache in de heel.

The Charles Keith company published "Old Dan Tucker" in Boston, Massachusetts, in 1843. The sheet music credits words to Dan Emmett but says that the song is from "Old Dan Emmit's Original Banjo Melodies." The lack of attribution of the melody may be another sign that Emmett did not write it.

=== Possible slave origin ===
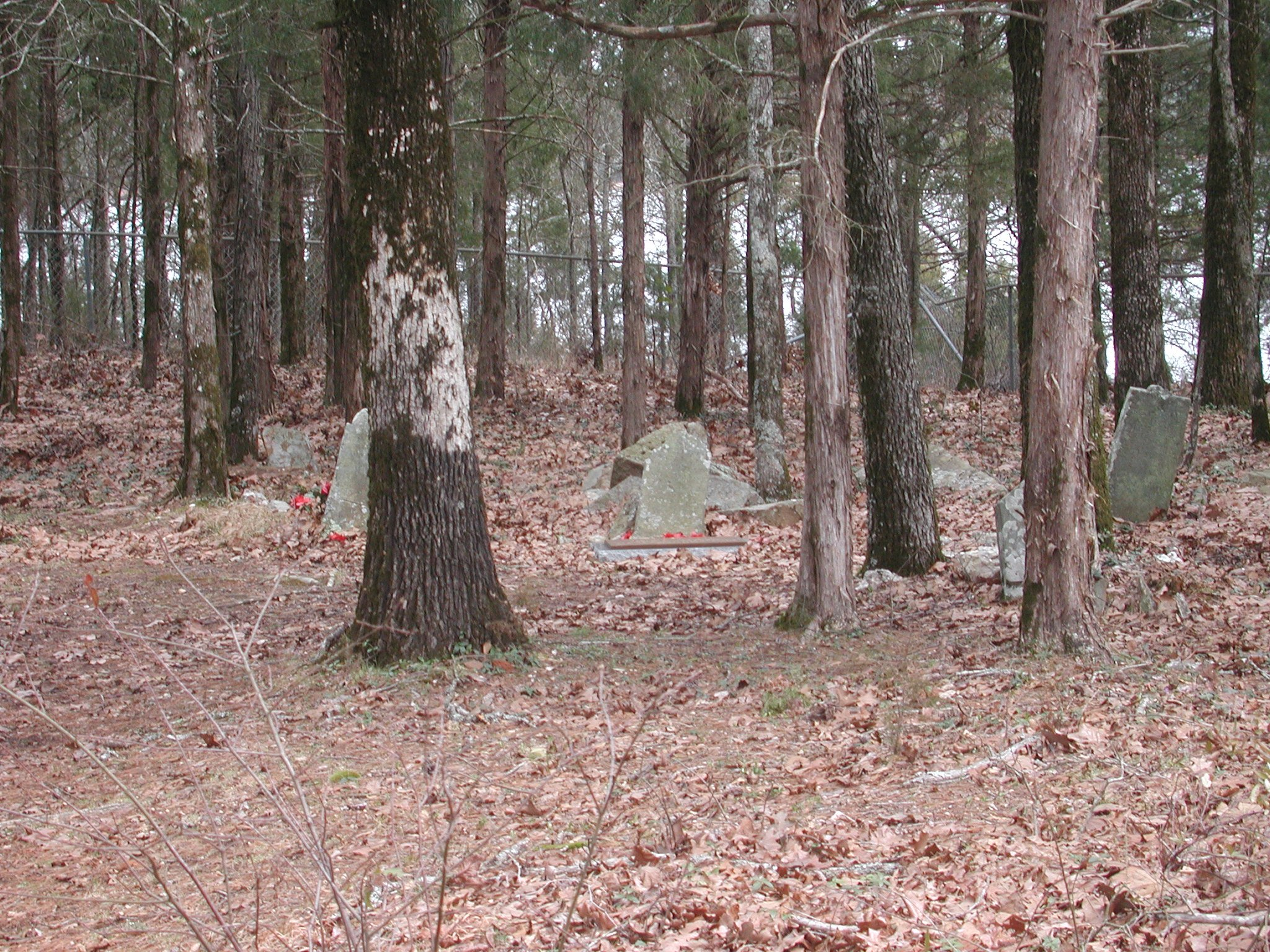
The graveyard where Daniel Tucker is buried in Elbert County, Georgia, is a tourist attraction due to the minister's possible connection to the song.

A story dating to at least 1965 says that "Old Dan Tucker" was written by slaves about a man named Daniel Tucker (February 14, 1744 – April 7, 1818) who lived in Elbert County, Georgia. Tucker was a farmer, ferryman, and minister who appears in records from the late 18th and early 19th centuries. The story, as related by Mrs. Guy Rucker, the great-great-granddaughter of one of Tucker's neighbors, claims that Tucker became quite well liked by the slaves in his area through his ministry to them.

According to this interpretation, the lyrics address Tucker directly. The chorus, "You're too late to get your supper" is a kindhearted taunt to a man who often arrived after dark, forcing his hosts to scrape up a meal for him. The song's occasional lewdness is explained by the natural impromptu nature of its supposed origin.

"Old Dan Tucker" does show evidence of black influence. For example, bizarre imagery in folk versions of the song (e.g., "toothache in his heel") may be a sign of legitimate black input (or of someone poking fun of slaves who had an incomplete knowledge of English). "Old Dan Tucker" most closely resembles African music in its call-and-response refrain.

Daniel Tucker was buried in Elbert County in 1818. The Elbert County Chamber of Commerce today promotes his grave as a tourist attraction due to his possible connection with the character from the song.

== Popularity ==
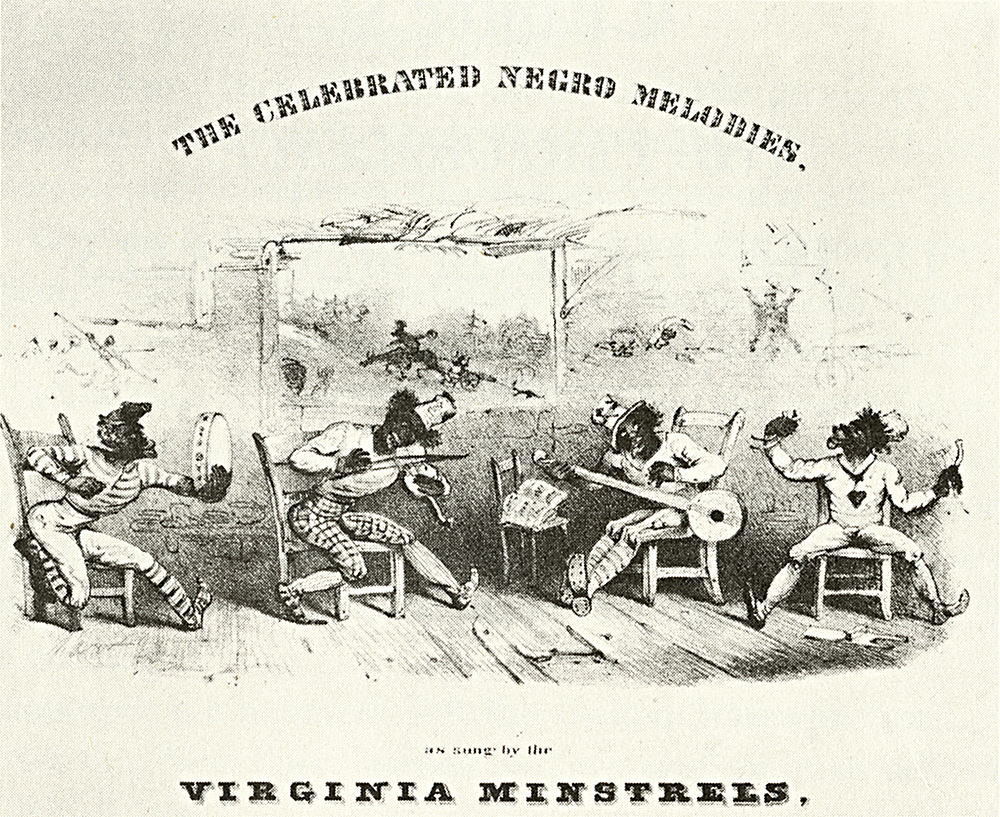
The Virginia Minstrels, seen here in a detail from cover of The Celebrated Negro Melodies, as Sung by the Virginia Minstrels, first performed "Old Dan Tucker" in 1843.

In December 1842 and January 1843, Dan Emmett portrayed the character Old Dan Tucker in solo and duo performances; the playbills do not indicate whether he included the song in his act. The Virginia Minstrels probably made "Old Dan Tucker" a regular part of their show beginning with their first performance at the Bowery Amphitheatre on February 6, 1843. Their minstrel show also included a comic scene loosely based on the song, "Dan Tucker on Horseback," about a black riding master. The piece starred Richard Pelham in the title role and Frank Brower as a black clown. "Old Dan Tucker" did not appear on a Virginia Minstrels playbill until a March 7 and 8 performance at Boston's Masonic Temple. There, the playbill described it as "OLD DAN TUCKER, a Virginian Refrain, in which is described the ups and downs of Negro life." As early as February 15, Emmett billed himself as "Old Dan Emmett."

By the end of March, "Old Dan Tucker" was a hit, and it quickly became the Virginia Minstrels' most popular song. Robert Winans found the song on 49% of the minstrel playbills he surveyed from the 1843–1847 period (behind only "Miss Lucy Long"), and research by musicologist William J. Mahar suggests that it was behind only "Mary Blane" and "Lucy Long" in its frequency of publication in antebellum songsters. The next year, Dan Tucker returned in the popular "Ole Bull and Old Dan Tucker," which pits him against Ole Bull in a contest of skill. Sequels such as "De New Ole Dan Tucker" and "Old Dan Tucker's Wedding" followed. Other companies adopted Tucker for comedy sketches, such as burlesques of La sonnambula by Buckley's Serenaders in 1850 and Sanford's Opera Troupe in 1853.

The song became so identified with Emmett and the Virginia Minstrels that it became part of their foundation myth. Billy Whitlock and George B. Wooldridge both claimed that the troupe members played "Old Dan Tucker" in their first impromptu performance together:

... as if by accident, each one picked up his tools and joined in a chorus of "Old Dan Tucker," while Emmett was playing and singing. It went well, and they repeated it without saying a word. Each did his best, and such a rattling of the principal and original instruments in a minstrel band was never heard before.

Emmett repeated this story in the May 19, 1877, New York Clipper, although other details changed. The press began to refer to Emmett as "Ole Dan Tucker," and Emmett eventually adopted the nickname. The Virginia Minstrels sometimes went by "Ole Dan Tucker and Co." They were called "Old Dan Tucker & Co.," either by themselves or by the press, as early as February 16, 1843.

The song's disdain for the customs of the upper classes hit a chord with working class audiences. On January 28, 1843, The New York Sporting Whip reported that the song had been adopted by a Philadelphia, Pennsylvania, street gang called the Hallow Guards. As their leader, Stovepipe Bill, led them against a military raid, he sang the verses followed by the gang singing the chorus. Two years later, The Knickerbocker remarked, "At this present moment, a certain ubiquitous person seems to be in the way of the whole people of these United States simultaneously." Nathanson claimed that "Old Dan Tucker" had "been sung, perhaps, oftener than any melody ever written."

In 1871, 28 years after its first published edition, Board and Trade listed editions of "Old Dan Tucker" in print from seven different publishers. The song had by default fallen into the public domain. In later decades, "Old Dan Tucker" became a standard of bluegrass and country music, with recordings by such artists as Fiddlin' John Carson, Uncle Dave Macon, Pete Seeger, and Gid Tanner and his Skillet Lickers.

The song regained some resurgence in Michael Landon's television adaptation of "Little House On The Prairie," based on Laura Ingalls Wilder's semi-autobiographical book series. The character of Isaiah Edwards, played by Victor French, was frequently heard singing or whistling "Old Dan Tucker" in multiple episodes of the show.
