= Dueto Acosta =

- Origin: Mexico
- Genres: Mexican vernacular music
- Labels: Okeh, Brunswick, Victor

Dueto Acosta was a vocal duo that performed Mexican vernacular music with an instrumental ensemble. They seem to be associated with Cancioneros "Acosta", a Chansonnier selling company in Mexico, and the ensemble was one of the earliest performers of corridos ever recorded in the United States (1923).

== Recordings ==
Between the months of December 1923 and January 1924, the ensemble traveled to New York City and made the following studio recordings with Okeh Records. All of them were performed by baritone Víctor J. Rosales with Orquesta González, but the first five of them include tenor G.A. Alva in the vocals while the rest were sung by José Moriche:

- Benito Canales (featuring G.A. Alva, tenor; Víctor J. Rosales, baritone; and Orquesta González; 19 December 1923)
- La mulita (featuring G.A. Alva, tenor; Víctor J. Rosales, baritone; and Orquesta González; 19 December 1923)
- Batos Furieles (featuring G.A. Alva, tenor; Víctor J. Rosales, baritone; and Orquesta González; 20 December 1923)
- El Yute (Emilio D. Uranga) (featuring G.A. Alva, tenor; Víctor J. Rosales, baritone; and Orquesta González; 2 January 1924)
- La madera (featuring G.A. Alva, tenor; Víctor J. Rosales, baritone; and Orquesta González; 2 January 1924)
- Canción minera (featuring José Moriche; Víctor J. Rosales, baritone; and Orquesta González. Recorded on 4 January 1924)
- Los repatriados (Sánchez Molgoza) (featuring José Moriche; Víctor J. Rosales, baritone; and Orquesta González. Recorded on 4 January 1924)
- Los pendientes (featuring José Moriche; Víctor J. Rosales, baritone; and Orquesta González. Recorded on 4 January 1924)
- El soldado (featuring José Moriche; Víctor J. Rosales, baritone; and Orquesta González. Recorded in January 1924)
- General Porfirio Díaz (featuring José Moriche; Víctor J. Rosales, baritone; and Orquesta González. Recorded in January 1924)
- Con tus ojos (featuring José Moriche; Víctor J. Rosales, baritone; and Orquesta González. Recorded in January 1924)
- Tragedia del general Francisco Villa (part 1 and 2) (featuring José Moriche; Víctor J. Rosales, baritone; and Orquesta González. Recorded in January 1924)
- Ataque a Torreón por Francisco Villa (14 January 1924)
- Las últimas palabras del general Felipe Ángeles en su defensa (14 January 1924)

Two years later, the ensemble returned to the United States and went back to the studio with different performers. Those sessions were recorded in Los Angeles, California, with Brunswick Records:

- Mujer perjura (featuring Hermanos Ramírez, January 1926)
- La máquina (featuring Hermanos Ramírez, January 1926)
- El mundo, engáñese (featuring Gómez and Fierro, August 1926)
- Rechiquititita (featuring Gómez and Fierro, August 1926)
- La cuatro milpas (featuring Guzmán and Gómez; tenor and baritone, August 1926)
- María, ay María (featuring Guzmán and Gómez; tenor and baritone, August 1926)
- En la chinampa (featuring Aurora Patiño and Roberto Guzmán; soprano and tenor, November 1926)
- El ferrocarril (featuring Patiño and Tobman, November 1926)

And according to the American Discography Project hosted at the University of California, Santa Barbara, they also made the following recordings with Victor:

- La vi partir (28 January 1930)
- Náufragos (28 January 1930)
- Te amaba inocente (28 January 1930)
- Álla a lo lejos (28 January 1930)
- Sueños (28 January 1930)
- Por las fronteras (2 February 1930)
- Esta noche con la luna (2 February 1930)
