= Ching-a-Ring Chaw =

Song

Ching-a-Ring Chaw (sometimes Ching-a-Ring, or Ching-a-Ring Shaw) is a song from the early days of the minstrel show tradition. A rewritten version frequently performed in modern times comes from Aaron Copland's 1952 Old American Songs song set.

== Lyrics ==
The precise lyrics vary, but they are generally approximately as follows:

Ching-a-ring-a ring ching ching,
Ho a ding-a-ding kum larkee,
Ching-a-ring-a ring ching ching,
Ho a ding kum larkee.

Brothers, gather round,
Listen to this story,
'Bout the promised land,
An' the promised glory.

You don't need to fear,
If you have no money,
You don't need none there,
To buy you milk and honey.

There you'll ride in style,
Coach with four white horses,
There the evenin' meal,
Has one two three four courses.

Nights we all will dance
To the harp and fiddle,
Waltz and jig and prance,
'And Cast off down the middle!'

When the mornin' come,
All in grand and splendour,
Stand out in the sun,
And hear the holy thunder!

Brothers, hear me out,
The promised land's a-comin'
Dance and sing and shout,
I hear them harps a-strummin'.

Ching-a-ring-a ching
ching ching, ching a ring ching
Ching-a-ring-a ching ching,
Ching a Ching a Ching chning

ching-a-ring-a,
ching-a-ring-a,
ching-a-ring-a,
ring, ching ching ching CHAW!

== History ==
Ching-a-Ring Chaw's origin was as a blackface minstrel song. While arranging the piece for the second set of his Old American Songs, composer Aaron Copland made a point of rewriting the lyrics to efface any of the song's minstrel baggage: "I did not want to take any chance of it being construed as racist."

== See also ==
- List of blackface minstrel songs
