= Alabama Joe =

Popular 19th century American minstrel song

Alabama Joe was a minstrel song in the United States during the 19th century.

== Lyrics ==
A guy in Alabama lived, dey used to call him Joe,
Dis guy lived to be so old, his head was white as snow.
Dis guy, he war very rich, the poor ones liked him well,
Dey used to go to de Alabama house some stories for to tell.

CHORUS.

An strike de toe an heel, my lass, an strike de heel an toe,
Miss Phillis am a waiting for your Alabama Joe,

This old guy built a church, a minister he hired,
Who staid with them about four years, and quit cause he war tired,
Their minister good salary got, as all these niggers know,
s De money, it war paid to him by Alabama Joe.

Dis made dese guys all feel bad, to think he sarved him so,
But the one the shock fell worst upon was Alabama Joe.
In a few years after dis de good old nigger died,
He left three guy all he had, and Miss Phillissy his bride.

His money he did will away to Phillissy his spouse,
Which caused great disturbance at dis old nigger's house.
Miss Phillissy had him buried all under an old tree,
And after dey had buried him, de niggers had a spree.

A nigger in Virginia lived who heard of old Joe's death,
And straight for Alabama steered, and never stopped for breath,
He quick made love to Phillissy who was a charming fair,
Her eyes were bright as diamonds, and curly war her hair

Dis nigger war a fisherman, a fisherman ob old,
A fishing he did go one night, and caught a beautiful cold.
Dis nigger lived in great harmony, and age did make him pine,
For she was only twenty-three, and he war ninety-nine,

Dis story that I now relate, as a good old nigger said,
He went one morning to their honse, and found dis couple dead,
Now Miss Phillissy she is dead, old Joe he went before,
Dar oder niggers hab gone to, we shall see them no more.

== See also ==
- List of blackface minstrel songs
