= Stephen Foster (sculpture) =

Sculpture by Giuseppe Moretti

Coordinates: 40°26′36″N 79°57′06″W

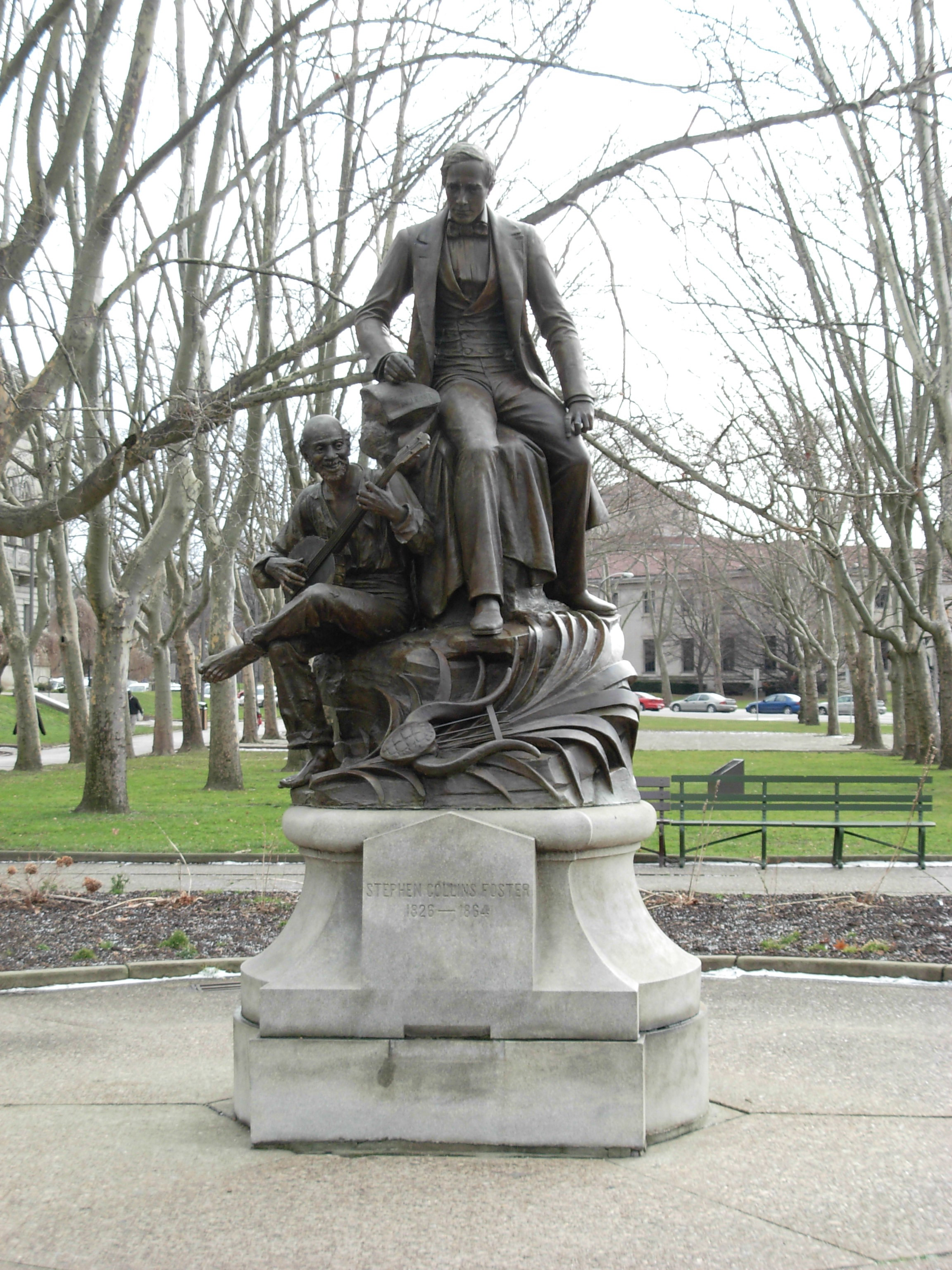
- Artist: Giuseppe Moretti
- Year: 1900
- Type: Sculpture
- Location: Pittsburgh, Pennsylvania, U.S.

Stephen Foster is a landmark public sculpture in bronze by Giuseppe Moretti formerly located on Schenley Plaza in the Oakland section of Pittsburgh, Pennsylvania. Formerly sited along Forbes Avenue near the entrance of Carnegie Museum of Natural History, in the shadow of Dippy, a life-size sculpture of a Diplodocus dinosaur, and in close proximity to the University of Pittsburgh's Stephen Foster Memorial, the Foster statue is one of the city's best known and most controversial. It was removed on April 26, 2018, on the unanimous vote of the Pittsburgh Art Commission.

The work of art is composed of two figures: a seated Stephen Collins Foster, the famous Pittsburgh-born songwriter who is depicted with a notebook in hand, and an African American man at his feet strumming a banjo, thought to represent "Old Uncle Ned," a fictionalized slave featured in Foster's song of the same name. The sculpture's pedestal is four feet, three inches, and the figures measure ten feet.

== History ==
Stephen Foster was first erected in 1900 in the city's Highland Park, where Moretti had recently completed grand neoclassical gates for the park's main entrance. An economic depression in the 1890s, however, caused the Pittsburgh Press to head a subscription drive to garner funds for the piece. Nearly 50,000 Pittsburghers lined the parade route for the statue's dedication. Victor Herbert, the Pittsburgh Symphony Orchestra's new music director, led 3,000 school children in the singing of Foster tunes. At the ceremony Stephen Foster's daughter Marion Foster Welch unveiled the statue and nieces of U.S. President James Buchanan laid a wreath at its base.

The actual design of the statue was by committee. Andrew W. Mellon the banker, Edward Manning Bigelow the parks director, Robert Pitcairn the Pennsylvania Railroad mogul, as well as the director of the Carnegie Museum of Art, among others, all met to brainstorm scenarios for the artwork. The current design was suggested by committee member T.J. Keenan Jr., editor of the Pittsburgh Press, and embraced by Moretti, according to the paper. It is intended to commemorate the song "Uncle Ned," and shows Ned, a slave, with Foster. Stephen Foster's brother Morrison Foster sat as a model in Moretti's New York studio.

Decades later during the Great Depression the sculpture was repeatedly vandalized; the banjo and Foster's pencil were broken off and sold, presumably, as scrap metal. Eventually Pittsburgh mayor Cornelius D. Scully requested the statue be moved to a more visible, safer place. During World War II it was moved to Oakland's Schenley Plaza, along busy Forbes Avenue and across the street from Stephen Foster Memorial. It was rededicated on June 29, 1944.

== Controversy ==
At least since the Civil Rights Movement, this statue of a white man and slave has periodically stirred public debate. Opponents claim that "Uncle Ned", the song whose composition is depicted, is inherently racist.

In 2000, a citizen group petitioned Pittsburgh mayor Tom Murphy to form a task force about the controversy. Some wanted a new statue. Others suggested a placard be placed on its base to provide historical context regarding Foster's relationship with the African American community.

Demands for the statue to be removed intensified in 2017 after protests in Charlottesville, Virginia erupted over the proposed removal of the city's Confederate monuments. Pittsburgh's Art Commission held two public hearings to collect feedback from concerned citizens. The majority of attendees believed that the statue was racist and wanted to either relocate it or contextualize it in some way, while some attendees hoped that the statue would remain as it was and serve as a tribute to Foster's legacy. The statue was removed on April 26, 2018, on the unanimous recommendation of the Art Commission.

A city-appointed Task Force on Women in Public Art called for the statue to be replaced with one honoring an African American woman with ties to the Pittsburgh community. The Task Force held a series of community forums in Pittsburgh to collect public feedback on the statue replacement and circulated an online form which allowed the public to vote for one of seven previously selected candidates or write in an alternate suggestion. However, the Task Force on Women in Public Art and the Pittsburgh Art Commission have not reached an agreement as to who will be commemorated or if the statue will stay in the Schenley Plaza location.

== See also ==
- Schenley Farms Historic District
