= The Dodger Song =

19th century American folk song

"The Dodger Song" is a 19th-century American folk song. Aaron Copland wrote an arrangement for it as part of Old American Songs, a collection of arrangements of folk songs.

"The Dodger" was said to have been used as a campaign song to belittle Republican James G. Blaine in the 1884 Presidential election between Blaine and Grover Cleveland, the Democratic candidate. Cleveland had won the support of progressives with his fight against Tammany Hall in New York. The version known today is based on a Library of Congress recording by Mrs. Emma Dusenberry of Mena, Arkansas, who learned it in the 1880s. It was transcribed and first published by Charles Seeger in a small Resettlement Administration songbook.
