= Old American Songs =

Two sets of songs arranged by Aaron Copland in 1950 and 1952

External audio
- You may hear "Old American Songs" sung by William Warfield with Aaron Copland conducting the Columbia Symphony Orchestra in 1963 Here on Archive.org

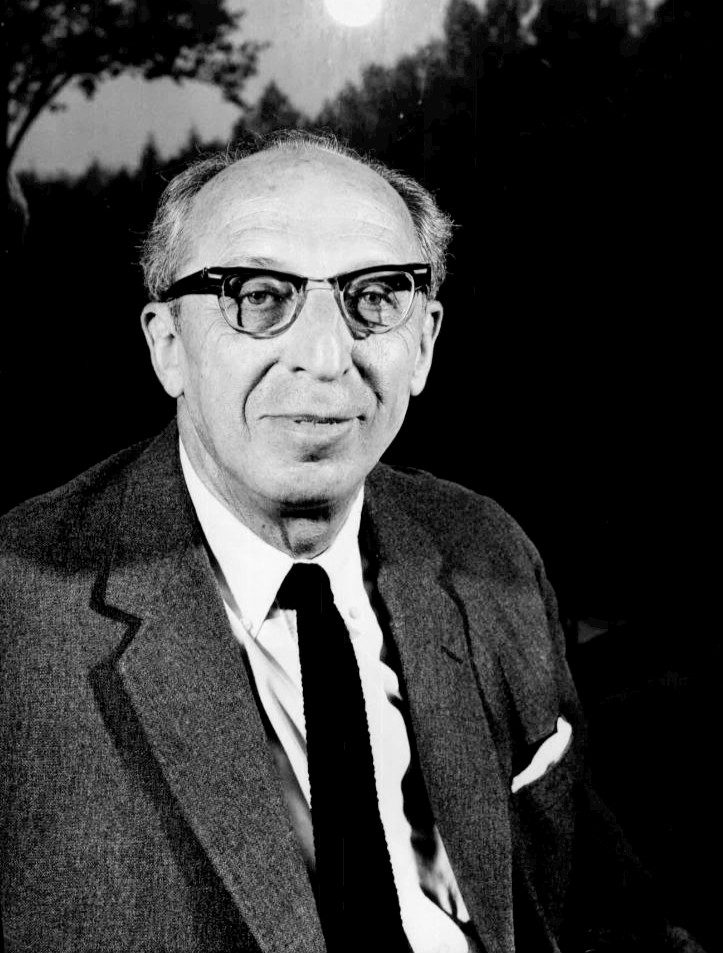
Aaron Copland in 1962

Old American Songs are two sets of songs arranged by Aaron Copland in 1950 and 1952 respectively, after research in the Sheet Music Collection of the Harris Collection of American Poetry and Plays, in the John Hay Library at Brown University. Originally scored for voice and piano, they were reworked for baritone (or mezzo-soprano) and orchestra.

Set 1 was first performed by Peter Pears (tenor) and Benjamin Britten (piano) on June 17, 1950, at Aldeburgh. The version of Set 1 for baritone and orchestra was premiered on January 7, 1955, by William Warfield and the Los Angeles Philharmonic, conducted by Alfred Wallenstein.

Set 2 was first performed by William Warfield and Aaron Copland (piano) on 24 July 1953 in Ipswich, Massachusetts, and later, in its orchestral form, by Grace Bumbry (mezzo-soprano) and the Ojai Festival Orchestra, conducted by the composer, in Ojai, California on 25 May 1958. Set 2 was recorded by Warfield and Copland on August 18, 1953, for Columbia Records.

Set 1
The Boatman's Dance (minstrel song from 1843)
The Dodger (campaign song)
Long Time Ago (ballad)
Simple Gifts (Shaker song)
I Bought Me a Cat (children's song, Roud Folk Song Index No. 544)
Set 2
The Little Horses (lullaby)
Zion’s Walls (revivalist song)
The Golden Willow Tree (Anglo-American ballad)
At the River (hymn tune)
Ching-A-Ring Chaw (minstrel song)

Both sets are published by Boosey & Hawkes. The voice and piano versions are easily transposed to any register; the orchestral sets can also be transposed but are usually sung in their original keys by either a baritone or a mezzo-soprano. Old American Songs have been recorded by many singers, notably mezzo-soprano Marilyn Horne and the baritones Sherill Milnes, Thomas Hampson, Bryn Terfel, and Thomas Quasthoff. William Warfield's recording is with the composer himself at the piano.

The songs have also been arranged for chorus: by Irving Fine (Set 1 and Set 2: song 5), Raymond Wilding-White (Set 2: songs 1 and 4), and Glenn Koponen (Set 2: songs 2 and 3). These transcriptions went unrecorded until 1985, when a CD featuring the Mormon Tabernacle Choir and the Utah Symphony Orchestra conducted by Michael Tilson Thomas was released.
