= Mary Blane =

American minstrel song

"Mary Blane", also known as "Mary Blain" and other variants, is an American song that was popularized in the blackface minstrel show. Several different versions are known, but all feature a male protagonist singing of his lover Mary Blane, her abduction, and eventual death. "Mary Blane" was by far the most popular female captivity song in antebellum minstrelsy.

== Lyrics ==
"Mary Blane" has at least five different sets of lyrics, the most of any song of its type. All tell the same typical Victorian-era captivity narrative: A woman is kidnapped or captured and may do no more than await rescue by a male protagonist or suffer at the hands of her captors. In most variants, the male singer and the female victim are married or longtime lovers. The lyrics usually begin by describing the history and current condition of their relationship prior to the abduction:

I once did know a pretty Gal,
And took her for my wife
She came from Louisiana,
And I lik'd her as my life.
We happy lib'd together
She nebber caus'd me pain,
But on one dark and dreary night
I lost my Mary Blane.

The identity of Mary Blane's abductors varies. In one edition, "A nigger come to my old hut"; in another "De white man come into my house, / And took poor Mary Blane". Yet another variant makes the captors American Indians. Another makes them Northern abolitionists, thus poking fun at the slave rescues carried out by some abolitionists.

The male protagonist then pines for his lost love and wallows in self-pity in later verses and during the chorus:

Oh, Farewell, Farewell poor Mary Blane
One Faithful heart will think of you
Farewell, Farewell poor Mary Blane
If we ne'er meet again.

The song usually ends tragically, with the lover confused and unable to take action or learning of Mary's death. In the odd version where the lovers are reunited, Mary Blane dies shortly thereafter:

I took her home unto my hut,
My heart was in great pain,
But afore de sun did shone next day
Gone dead was Mary Blane.

Some variants go into lurid detail about the treatment Mary receives. In one, she is tied to a tree, tarred and feathered, and ultimately killed. The song thus highlights two of minstrelsy's most common gender-defined roles: the objectified and silent woman, and the pining male.

Minstrel troupes cobbled together texts from different sources and appended or removed verses. As a result, some editions contain entire verses that break the flow of the narrative. Others feature nonsense verses and stock phrases from other songs that have nothing to do with the song. Some variants may have been intended for certain types of audiences or local to certain regions.

== Structure and performance ==
"Mary Blane" was sung to two entirely different melodies. The first is 36–40 measures long and consists of a prelude, a three-part chorus, and a postlude. The measure count varies with the lengths of the prelude and postlude.

The stage performance of "Mary Blane" is not well known. However, the song is primarily sentimental in nature, so its singer most likely took a maudlin and melodramatic approach. The seemingly illogical verses that were often added may have served as comedy, or they may simply have provided something familiar to audiences and freed up the company to act out scenes, dance, or do other dramatic bits.

== Composition and popularity ==
Credits for "Mary Blane" vary. A version in print from 1844 to 1855 credits words to Wellington Guernsey and music to George Barker. An 1847 edition attributes the song to J. H. Howard. Rival 1848 editions credit Edwin P. Christy or Charles White and John Hill Hewitt. The name of F. C. Germon (or German) appears in credits as well.

Regardless of who originally wrote or composed it, "Mary Blane" was by far the most popular song in the lost-lover genre in antebellum blackface minstrelsy. Research by musicologist William J. Mahar's has found versions of the song in more songsters published between 1843 and 1860 than any other number, edging out such hits as "Miss Lucy Long" and "Old Dan Tucker".
