= Phil Rice =

British songwriter, producer and keyboard player

Phil Rice (also known as Philip James Rice) (born Lancashire, England) is a songwriter, producer and keyboard player. He is part of a songwriting and performing partnership with Rick Guard. As a live performer, Rice has worked with some of the leading artists in the world, including Lionel Richie, Russell Watson, Shirley Bassey, and Ronan Keating.

== Songwriting work and performing of note ==
In the year of its release, "Stop It I Like It" (written with Rick Guard) was a Top 20 hit in eleven countries, the 75th highest played song on the radio in the world, and in the top 10 of ringtone charts in Europe. It has also been used on a top-selling computer game Pop Life and Dance: UK.

"All or Nothing", written with Russell Watson, was released on the U.S. version of the Reprise album.

"Jublilate Domum", written with Jon Christos, was included on the Sony BMG / Universal Music released The Number One Classical Album in the World and A Classic Christmas.

"Lay Me Down", written with Ashley MacIsaac, was released on Decca Records by the Canadian folk star.

"The Truth About Love," written with Guard, was used as the theme to the Jennifer Love Hewitt and Dougray Scott film of the same name.

== Discography ==
- "Stop It I Like It" – Rick Guard (Decca, 2002)
- "Show Me Yours" – Rick Guard (Decca, 2002)
- "Hands of a Giant" – Rick Guard (Decca, 2002)
- "All or Nothing" – Russell Watson (Decca, 2003)
- "Lay Me Down" – Ashley MacIsaac (Decca, 2004)
- "I Don't Need This" – Ashley MacIsaac (Decca, 2004)
- "Jublilate Domum" – Jon Christos (Roots Music, 2005)

Also on The Number One Classical Album in the World 2006 (Universal/Sony BMG 2006) and A Classic Christmas (Universal / Sony BMG 2006)

- "All Or Nothing" – Jon Christos (Roots Music, 2005)
- "Shadow" – Jon Christos (Roots Music, 2005)
- "The Truth About Love" – Rick Guard (Linermedia 2007)
- "Anyone But Me" – Rick Guard (Linermedia 2009)
