= Miss Lucy Long =

1843 American minstrel song

"Miss Lucy Long", also known as "Lucy Long" as well as by other variants, is an American song that was popularized in the blackface minstrel show.

After its introduction to the stage by the Virginia Minstrels in 1843, "Miss Lucy Long" was adopted by rival troupes. George Christy's cross-dressed interpretation standardized the portrayal of the title character and made the song a hit in the United States. "Miss Lucy Long" became the standard closing number for the minstrel show, where it was regularly expanded into a comic skit complete with dialogue.

Versions were printed in more songsters and performed in more minstrel shows than any other popular song in the antebellum period.

In blackface minstrelsy, the name Lucy came to signify any sexually promiscuous woman.

== History ==
The first published edition of "Miss Lucy Long" is uncredited in an 1842 songster called Old American Songs. Billy Whitlock of the Virginia Minstrels later claimed the song in his autobiography: "I composed ... 'Miss Lucy Long' (the words by T. G. Booth) in 1838."

Despite predating the minstrel show, "Miss Lucy Long" gained its fame there. The song was the first wench role in minstrelsy. The Virginia Minstrels performed it as their closing number from their earliest performances. Dan Gardner introduced what would become the standard Lucy Long costume, skirts and pantalettes. George Christy's interpretation for the Christy Minstrels became the standard for other troupes to follow. The New York Clipper ignored Gardner completely and wrote "George [Christy] was the first to do the wench business; he was the original Lucy Long."

By 1845, the song had become the standard minstrel show closing number, and it remained so through the antebellum period. Programs regularly ended with the note that "The concert will conclude with the Boston Favorite Extravaganza of LUCY LONG." The name Lucy came to signify a woman who was "sexy, somewhat grotesque, and of suspect virtue" in minstrelsy. Similar songs appeared, including "Lucy Neal". In the late 1920s, a dance called the Sally Long became popular; the name may derive from the minstrel song.

Musicologist Robert B. Winans found versions of "Miss Lucy Long" in 34% of minstrel show programs he examined from the 1843–52 period and in 55% from 1843 to 1847, more than any other song. Mahar's research found that "Miss Lucy Long" is the second most frequent song in popular songsters from this period, behind only "Mary Blane". The song enjoyed a resurgence in popularity from 1855 to 1860, when minstrelsy entered a nostalgic phase under some companies.

== Lyrics ==
Many different "Miss Lucy Long" texts are known. They all feature a male singer who describes his desire for the title character. In the style of many folk song narratives, most versions begin with the singer's introduction:

Oh! I just come afore you,
To sing a little song;
I plays it on de Banjo,
And dey calls it Lucy Long.

Compare this later recorded version by Joe Ayers:

I've come again to see you,
I'll sing another song,
Just listen to my story,
It isn't very long.

For nineteenth-century audiences, the comedy of "Lucy Long" came from several different quarters. Eric Lott argues that race is paramount. The lyrics are in an exaggerated form of Black Vernacular English, and the degrading and racist depictions of Lucy—often described as having "huge feet" or "corncob teeth"—make the male singer the butt of the joke for desiring someone whom white audiences would find so unattractive. However, in many variants, Lucy is desirable—tall, with good teeth and "winning eyes". Musicologist William J. Mahar thus argues that, while the song does address race, its misogyny is in fact more important. "Miss Lucy Long" is a "'public expressions of male resentment toward a spouse or lover who will not be subservient, a woman's indecision, and the real or imagined constraints placed on male behaviors by law, custom, and religion." The song reaffirms a man's supposed right to sexual freedom and satirizes courtship and marriage. Still, the fact that the minstrel on stage would desire someone the audience knew to be another man was a source of comic dramatic irony.

The refrain is simple:

Oh! Take your time Miss Lucy,
Take your time Miss Lucy Long!
Oh! Take your time Miss Lucy,
Take your time Miss Lucy Long!

However, its meaning is more difficult to identify and varies depending on the preceding verse. For example:

I axed her for to marry,
Myself de toder day;
She said she'd rather tarry,
So I let her habe her way.

The verse makes Lucy out to be a "sexual aggressor who prefers 'tarrying' (casual sex, we may infer) to marrying. ... " The singer for his part seems to be in agreement with the notion. Thus, Lucy is in some way in charge of their relationship. Of course, audiences could easily take "tarry" as either a sexual reference or an indication of a prim and reserved Lucy Long.

However, other verses put the power back in the male's hands. For example, this verse makes Lucy no better than a traded commodity:

If she makes a scolding wife,
As sure as she was born,
I'll tote her down to Georgia,
And trade her off for corn.

In the Ayers version of the song, Miss Lucy and the male singer are already married. The lyrics further subvert Lucy's ability to control the sexual side of the relationship:

And now that we are married,
I expect to have some fun,
And if Lucy doesn't mind me,
This fellow will cut and run.

The singer later promises to "fly o'er de river, / To see Miss Sally King." He is the head of the relationship, and Lucy is powerless to stop him from engaging in an extramarital affair. Lucy's social freedom is limited to dancing the cachucha and staying home to "rock the cradle".

"Miss Lucy Long and Her Answer", a version published in 1843 by the Charles H. Keith company of Boston, Massachusetts, separates the song into four stanzas from the point of view of Lucy's lover and four from Lucy herself. She ultimately shuns "de gemman Dat wrote dat little song, Who dare to make so public De name ob Lucy Long" and claims to prefer "De 'stinguished Jimmy Crow."

== Structure and performance ==
"Miss Lucy Long" is a comic banjo tune, and there is little melodic variation between published versions. Nevertheless, the tune is well-suited to embellishment and improvisation. The verses and refrain use almost identical music, which enabled troupes to vary the verse/chorus structure and to add play-like segments. A repeated couplet binds the piece together and gives it a musical center around which these embellishments can occur.

The lyrics of the comic banjo tune, are written in exaggerated African American Vernacular English and tell of the courtship or marriage of the male singer and the title character. "Miss Lucy Long" satirizes black concepts of beauty and courtship and American views of marriage in general. The song is misogynistic; the male character dominates Lucy and continues his sexually promiscuous lifestyle despite his relationship with her.

Minstrels usually performed the song as part of a sketch in which one minstrel cross dressed to play Lucy Long. The blackface players danced and sang with regular interruptions of comic dialogue. The part of Lucy was probably not a speaking role and relied entirely on pantomime.

For example, in 1846, Dan Emmett and Frank Brower added these lines to a "Miss Lucy Long" sketch:

[Dialogue.]
FRANK She had a ticklar gagement to go to camp me[e]tin wid dis child.
DAN hah! You went down to de fish Market to daunce arter eels. mity cureous kind ob camp meetin dat!
FRANK I[t] wasn't eels, it was a big cat fish.
DAN What chune did you dance?

Chorus [both singing].
Take your time Miss Lucy
Take your time Miss Lucy Long
Rock de cradle Lucy
Take your time my dear.

[Dialogue.]
FRANK I trade her off for bean soup.
DAN Well, you is hungryest nigger eber I saw. You'r neber satisfied widout your tinken bout bean soup all de time.

Chorus [both singing].
