= Wintermute Lake =

Lake in the state of Minnesota, United States

- Location within Minnesota
- Location: Stevens County, Minnesota
- Coordinates: 45°38′55″N 95°53′40″W
- Type: lake

Wintermute Lake is a lake in Stevens County, in the U.S. state of Minnesota.

Wintermute Lake was named for Charles Wintermute, a pioneer who settled near the lake.

== See also ==
- List of lakes in Minnesota
