= Ole Bull and Old Dan Tucker =

Traditional American minstrel song

"Ole Bull and Old Dan Tucker" is a traditional American song. Several different versions are known, the earliest published in 1844 by the Boston-based Charles Keith company. The song's lyrics tell of the rivalry and contest of skill between Ole Bull (named for Ole Bournemann Bull, a famous violinist) and Dan Tucker (title character of the blackface hit of the same name). The song also satirizes the low pay earned by early minstrel performers: "Ole Bull come to town one day [and] got five hundred for to play."

The song was fairly popular in the minstrel show's first few years. Winans's research found it in 19% of minstrel show programs for the 1843-7 period. A localized version is known, called "Philadelphia Old Bull and Old Dan Tucker".
