= Charles H. Keith =

American music publisher

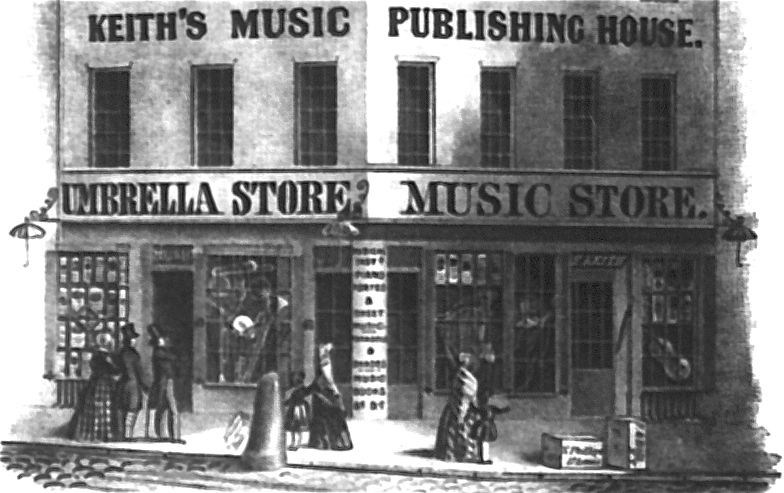
Music and umbrella shop of Charles H. Keith, corner Court Street and Cornhill, Boston, Massachusetts, 1845 (Library of Congress)

Charles H. Keith was an American music publisher in Boston, Massachusetts, in the 19th century. His business was located on Court Street from the 1840s to the 1850s. Among the songs published by his firm were "Old Dan Tucker" (1843), "Ole Bull and Old Dan Tucker" (1844), and "Dandy Jim ob Caroline" (1844).
