= The Boatman's Dance =

1843 song by Dan Emmett

"The Boatman's Dance" is a minstrel song credited to Dan Emmett in 1843. In 1950 it was revived and arranged by Aaron Copland as part of his set of Old American Songs.

It is a celebration of the Ohio River boatmen, bawdy and wily, and is easily recognizable by its repeated clarion cry: "Hey, ho, the boatman row, sailin' on the river on the Ohio." (Alternatively may be "Hi, ho" or "Hi, row")

The song went through numerous revisions before a settled version passed into the repertoire. Both the minstrel version and the Copland arrangement are widely performed and recorded.

The bluegrass jam band Yonder Mountain String Band regularly covers it and released a studio version as a hidden track on their release Town By Town.

The bluegrass string band The Hackensaw Boys recorded Boatman on their 2002 album Give It Back.
