= Walk Along John =

Song

- Other name: "Oh, Come Along John"
- Written: 1843

"Walk Along John", also known as "Oh, Come Along John", is an American song written for the blackface minstrel show stage in 1843. The lyrics of the song are typical of those of the early minstrel show. They are largely nonsense about a black man who boasts about his exploits.

The chorus is:

Come along John, Come along John,
Come along John, de fifer's son,
Ain't you might glad dat your day's work done.

"Walk Along John" is a likely source of inspiration for the later minstrel hit, "Old Dan Tucker". Verses in both songs are quite similar, such as this one:

Johnny lay on de rail road track,
He tied de engine on his back;
He pair's his corn wid a rail road wheel,
It gib 'im de tooth ache in de heel.

Compare with this verse, commonly found in versions of "Old Dan Tucker":

Old Daniel Tucker wuz a mighty man,
He washed his face in a fryin' pan;
Combed his head wid a wagon wheel
And he died wid de toofache in his heel.
