= Rick Guard =

- Origin: Chorley, Lancashire, England
- Years active: 2002–present

Rick Guard is an English singer-songwriter who released his debut album, Hands of a Giant, in 2002.

== Career ==
Guard's first single gained top twenty positions in eleven countries (in most of which he toured) and was in the top ten downloaded ringtones of that year. Amongst Guard and Rice's writing credits are hits for opera star Russell Watson, Canadian Ashley MacIssac, and opera singer, Jon Christos. Guard and Rice (Guard sang) wrote the title soundtrack to the movie The Truth About Love, starring Dougray Scott, Jennifer Love Hewitt and Jimi Mistry. The pair have also written popular theme music for English, Australian and Polish TV shows. They also have a song included on a best-selling Sony PlayStation game.

== Appearances ==
Guard's gigging career so far includes performances in England for Elizabeth II, The Princess Royal, OK Magazine, Manchester United FC, Manchester City FC, the V2 summer festival, Children In Need with the BBC Orchestra, The Royal Festival Hall, Sky One TV, Granada TV, The Box video channel, MTV, Radio 2, Cardiff Red Dragon festival, Feel the Noise Festival Liverpool and other live public, corporate and private events and Manchester 235. Guard has received radio play on the majority of the independent, BBC and national radio stations, and particularly extensive airplay in Europe. Guard received the prestigious Belgian Zommerhit award. At the end of 2003, Guard's first single "Stop it I Like It" was in the top 75 of highest radio played records in the world chart. Guard has also gigged live events and TV in South Africa, France, Austria, Belgium, Poland, Egypt, Spain, Holland and Ireland working with artists such as Ronan Keating, Russell Watson, and Lionel Richie. He has played to TV audiences of four million and stadiums of up to 65,000 people.

== Discography ==
=== Albums ===
List of albums, with selected details
Title	Details
Hands of a Giant	Released: 2002; Format: CD; Label: Decca (473 200–2)

=== Charting singles ===
List of singles, with selected chart positions
Title	Year	Peak chart positions				Album
Title	Year	AUS	FIN	FRA	SPA	Album
"Stop It (I Like It!)"	2002	55	18	38	5	Hands of a Giant
