= Old Uncle Ned =

1845 song by Stephen Foster

- 1892 cover for the illustrated picture book Old Uncle Ned based on the song

Song
- Written: 1845
- Published: 1848
- Genre: Minstrel song
- Songwriter: Stephen Foster

"Old Uncle Ned", sometimes given as "Uncle Ned", is a song with music and lyrics by American songwriter Stephen Foster. It is part of a group of songs created by Foster which served as a foundation for the "quintessentially American" sound of the U.S.'s popular music. Created in 1845, it was first published in 1848. Written during the age of slavery in the United States, the song tells of a master's love for his dying loyal slave. While a best-selling song, Foster made little money off of this work because of the many unauthorized pirated publications of the tune circulating in the marketplace both in America and in England. The popularity of the song was in part due to the Christy's Minstrels show which performed the work across America and in Europe in the 19th century. It became a standard of the blackface minstrel show.

While "Old Uncle Ned" was one of Foster's most frequently performed songs during his lifetime, it did not have enduring popularity. Its problematic lyrics led to alterations of its text in order to maintain it in the performance canon in the early to mid 20th century, but after this it has been rarely performed or recorded. 21st century writers on the song indicate that current audiences would perceive its lyrics as racist and offensive. However, scholars of 19th century American music note that the tune was unusual at the time for its sympathetic portrayal of a slave in comparison to other songs in the minstrel show canon of the period. This has led some writers to argue that it was an anti-slavery tune when viewed in context to the culture it was written in.

== History ==
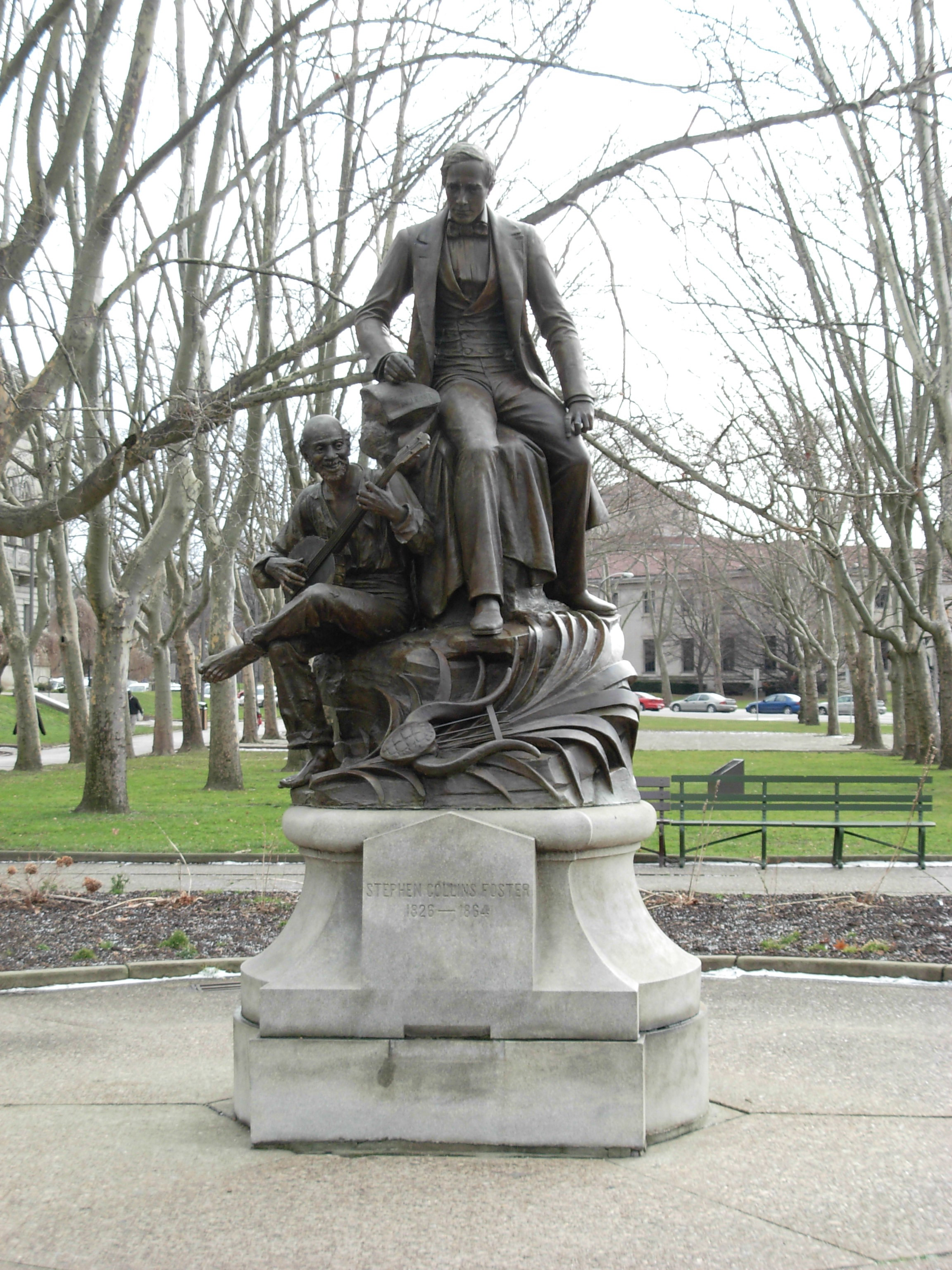
Giuseppe Moretti's Stephen Foster sculpture with Old Uncle Ned playing the banjo

=== Creation and publication ===
"Old Uncle Ned" was one of two songs created by Stephen Foster in 1845 for the Knights of the Square Table (KST), a neighborhood boy's club in Allegheny City, Pennsylvania (now part of Pittsburgh). Crafted at the very beginning of Foster's songwriting career, it was the second song written by Foster. His first song, "Lou’siana Belle", was also written for the KST in 1845 one week prior to "Old Uncle Ned". The song was taken up early by Christy's Minstrels, and performed widely by them on tour which helped increase the popularity of the song. The song became a standard tune of the minstrel show repertoire in both the United States and in Europe due to the Christy tours. It is considered part of a group of songs written by Foster which provided a foundation for the "quintessentially American" sound of popular music in the United States.

"Old Uncle Ned" was first published in Louisville, Kentucky, by William Cummings Peters in 1848 while Foster was living in Cincinnati. A number of pirated publications of the song were also published in 1848, including one credited to William Roark which was published in New York City by W.E. Millet. These pirated publications emerged after Foster had distributed copies of his song to many minstrel show performers in the hopes that they might perform his song in their shows. The prolific sales of his song in its various publications led Foster to decide to pursue a career as a songwriter full time, although he made very little money off of "Old Uncle Ned" because he received no profits from sales of pirated sheet music that were printed in cities across the United States and in London, England. Later publications altered the lyrics of the original, sometimes in an attempt to simplify the original text, and in other cases to remove text that was viewed as objectionable. This was also true of recordings of the song.

=== Music and lyrics ===
"Old Uncle Ned" is one of Foster's sentimental blackface songs, others of which include "Oh Susanna" (1848), "Camptown Races" (1850), and "Old Folks at Home" (1851). Historian David Wondrich stated the song was ballad like and possessed a "pseudo Irish sentimentality". The song uses a call and response structure, and contains a chorus written in three-part harmony and a four measure dance as a postlude. The chorus was written to be sung a cappella, and was later re-arranged as a quartet in many later publications after Foster's death. The song is known for an early example of Foster's use of the 2-3-1 escape tone cadence in its harmonic structure, a cadential ending that became a signature in his music compositions.

The lyrics of "Old Uncle Ned" are written in a heavy dialect and celebrate the life of a loyal elderly slave at the time of his death by his master. The song contains the N word as well as other racial language, and depicts the old slave as bald, blind, and toothless. The master weeps of the death of his slave whom he views as "like family". While some contemporary scholars have criticized the lyrics of the song as racist and offensive, others have noted that Foster's song was much more sympathetic and less harsh in its portrayal than earlier minstrel songs and marked a kinder tonal shift than what had previously existed in the minstrel musical canon.

African-American music scholar Matthew D. Morrison stated that "the noisy, repetitive, and more derisive caricatured performance of the Jim Crow character evolved into Foster's somewhat introspective, sympathetically treated "Old Uncle Ned." Other scholars have called the work an anti-slavery song when viewed through the lens of mid-19th century American culture while acknowledging that 21st century readers would not be able to perceive it as an abolitionist tune. This view is reflected in 19th century black abolitionist Frederick Douglass's opinion of the song which he viewed favorably because he felt it would engender sympathy for enslaved blacks in the United States. Literary critic David S. Reynolds stated that Harriet Beecher Stowe's Uncle Tom was similar to Old Uncle Ned in that they were both "romantically racialized black figures", and noted that Foster's body of songs, including "Old Uncle Ned", transformed the minstrel literature by "emphasizing that blacks possessed the same feelings and motivations that whites did".

=== Performances, recordings and other history ===
"Old Uncle Ned" was a standard of the minstrel show repertoire from the late 1840s onwards. Sketches were built around the song that emphasized the "paternal kindness" of white slave owners. It was sung often by amateurs as well as professionals. The song was not only popular in America but became a favorite among blackface performers of the English laboring class in the 1850s, and was even recorded as being known among Arabs in North Africa by 1853. It was still popular with American audiences well into the 20th century.

Prior to the Fugitive Slave Act of 1850, the escaped slave Henry Box Brown adopted "Old Uncle Ned" as his signature tune, but added his own lyrics "The Escape of Henry Box Brown" in which he vowed not to grow old and feeble as a slave. He published his version of the song with his escaped slave lyrics and partially made a living off of the sales of this sheet music. In 1850 the Ethiopian Serenaders performed Brown's version of the song on their tour to Ireland. African-American anti-slavery activist Joshua McCarter Simpson also found the lyrics of the song objectionable, and in the 1850s wrote new lyrics to make the song more palatable to an abolitionist audience. The African American Snowden Family Band included the tune in their repertoire but with new lyrics that entirely removed its slavery context, and it replaced it as a song between lovers.

In 1878 Charles Batchelor sang the song for a demonstration of Thomas Edison's newly invented phonograph given at the Smithsonian Institution. Edison frequently used the tune in marketing the phonograph in the early years of that technology. The song was subsequently recorded by the Haydn Quartet (1902 and 1904, Victor Talking Machine Company); Graham Marr and the Columbia Stellar Quartette (1916, Columbia Records); Fiddlin' John Carson (1924, Okeh Records); Al Hopkins and The Buckle Busters (1928, Brunswick Records); Guy Lombardo and the Royal Canadians (1930, Columbia Records); Burl Ives (1944, Decca Records; also in 1949 and 1952); and Billy Edd Wheeler (1962, Monitor Records).

In 1998 the song was included in Robert Winans's album The Early Minstrel Show for New World Records which attempted to record minstrel show music in the way it would have been performed in the 19th century. It was performed by an African-American quartet, the 4 Blackbirds, in the 1935 short film Memories and Melodies about the life of Steven Foster.

In 1900 the bronze sculpture Stephen Foster by Giuseppe Moretti was erected in Pittsburgh's Highland Park. The sculpture depicted Foster with Old Uncle Ned strumming a banjo at his feet. It remained there until 2018 when it was removed due to accusations that it was white appropriation of black culture.

The tune to the song "The Old Chisholm Trail" was a reworking of the melody of "Old Uncle Ned".

== Literary allusions to "Old Uncle Ned" ==
The lyrics of "Old Uncle Ned" have been quoted or alluded to in a number of literary works. African-American writer Martin Delany in his 1859 novel Blake; or the Huts of America rewrote the lyrics of the song, changing them from their original depiction of a loyal slave into a lyric of subversive and shrewd insurrection in what The New York Times described as a "revenge anthem". Excerpts from the song's lyrics are quoted in Thomas Mayne Reid's short story "Among the Palmettos, An Adventure in the Swamps of Louisiana" from his book The Pierced Heart, and Other Stories (1885) and James Joyce's novel Ulysses (1922).

Laura Ingalls Wilder included the song at the end of the chapter "Sundays" in her book Little House in the Big Woods (1932) in what one literary scholar described as "a jarring selection, a song of slavery, privation, and death, played for Laura and her sisters as they drift off to sleep" which "casts a pall over the proceedings, undercuts the jollity, and raises troubling questions for children". Objections to the songs lyrics published in that book, which includes the word "darkeys" (in place of the N word), led to the book being banned by schools in Stockton, California, in 1996. Part of "Old Uncle Ned" is sung by a character in the 1964 short story "Boys and Girls" by Alice Munro.

== See also ==
- Minstrel song
- Coon song
- Old Black Joe
