= Seely Simpkins Jig =

Song

"Seely Simpkins Jig" is a song by American songwriter Dan Emmett. Emmett named the song for Seeley Simpkins, a resident of Knox County, Ohio, well known for his fiddle playing and whistling. Simpkins' property neighbored that of Thomas Snowden, a man whom Howard L. and Judith Sacks credit with helping Emmett write the song "Dixie". "Seely Simpkins Jig" was later published as a quickstep in Fife Instructor, a manual by Emmett.
