= Jon Christos =

English singer (born 1976)

Background information
- Born: 23 March 1976 (age 50)
- Origin: Salford, Greater Manchester, England
- Genres: Classical, Crossover.
- Years active: 2004–present
- Label: Roots Music Group

Jon Christos (born John Christodoulou 23 March 1976, Salford, England) is an English singer, local radio presenter. and a member of the Professorial Staff – Vocal Studies at the Trinity Laban Conservatoire of Music and Dance.

A classically trained tenor, he is best known for albums of operatically-styled crossover music.

== Biography ==
=== Early years and education ===
Born John Christodoulou in Salford, Greater Manchester to a British mother and a Greek Cypriot father. He started playing the violin at the age of 4, quickly changing to the piano. He studied at the renowned Chethams School of Music in Manchester and then the Royal Northern College of Music.

Whilst at the RNCM Christos took lead tenor roles, such as Tamino in Mozart's The Magic Flute and Count Almaviva in the college's production of Rossini's The Barber of Seville performed at the Aix-en-Provence music festival in Southern France. Around this time he sang Ernesto in Clonter Opera's production of Donizetti's Don Pasquale.

In 1996 he made his Manchester Bridgewater Hall debut in Berlioz's L'Enfance du Christ under Kent Nagano. He has also performed many times in major oratorios, such as Handel's Messiah, as well as works such as Verdi's Requiem at venues including the Royal Albert Hall and the Royal Festival Hall.

=== "Chasing the dream" ===
Deciding on a change in direction, Christos career change when manager and producer Perry Hughes took control and signed him first to Sony then to his own label roots music group. Perry had managed the career and was responsible of the success of Russell Watson when signing Christos to Roots Music Group this led to the release of Christos' debut album Northern Light, followed by a Granada TV documentary, in their Chasing The Dream series. This included footage of Christos' trip to the US on 6 September 2005, to perform with Erich Kunzel and his Cincinnati Pops Orchestra at a special "9/11" commemorative concert. Northern Light reached number 6 in the classical albums charts.

=== 2006–present ===
In July 2006 Christos accompanied conductor and composer Carl Davis in a Sports Symphony themed concert in Pamplona, Spain. He again performed with Davis, in October 2006 with the Royal Scottish National Orchestra in Glasgow and Edinburgh and in May 2007 with the Halle Orchestra at Manchester Bridgewater Hall. Christos also accompanied Davis in June 2007 at James Bond theme concerts with the Royal Liverpool Philharmonic, and the next month at Leeds Castle in Kent. In the summer of that year Christos headlined the Northern Proms in Durham., the autumn saw him perform at the Royal Albert Hall Football Reaching out for Africa charity concert organised by Patti Boulaye, and in the winter he sang at the Professional Footballers' Association Centenary Match at the City of Manchester Stadium and the following gala Centenary dinner at Manchester's G-Mex centre with Natasha Marsh.

He also performed with Alfie Boe and Garðar Thór Cortes as the new Three Tenors at the launch of the new Cunard Line ship the MS Queen Victoria at Southampton in the presence of Charles, Prince of Wales and Camilla, Duchess of Cornwall.

During 2008 Christos's notable performances included, Friday Night is Music Night from the Chichester Festival Theatre, Music For Champions, with Carl Davis, Birmingham Symphony Hall. and the televised Professional Footballers' Association awards Grosvenor House Hotel. In the summer Christos returned to Hyde Park, Hyde, Greater Manchester for a third consecutive time supporting the Manchester Camerata. In the autumn he sang with the Royal Liverpool Philharmonic under the direction of Anthony Inglis, the Welsh Guards Band and Natasha Marsh before over 2,000 people in Liverpool Cathedral to commemorate the final visit of Queen Elizabeth 2 to the port. Dignitaries attending included the Lord Mayor of Liverpool, Simon Weston, Beryl Bainbridge and John Prescott.

2009 began with a sad occasion for Christos, singing at the memorial service of Sara Roache, wife of his friend Coronation Street actor William Roache. Duetto, a new collaboration between Christos and soprano Jenny Williams was launched and was featured on a live BBC Radio Lancashire broadcast (3 July). The summer saw Christos headline The QuexSpitfire Proms at Birchington near Margate, Kent, accompanied by the National Symphony Orchestra. In September he sang at the live televised BBC Proms in the Park from Buile Hill Park, Salford, Greater Manchester, an event which also featured the BBC Philharmonic and singer/songwriter Chris de Burgh. The following month saw him star with the Royal Liverpool Philharmonic Orchestra at the Royal Court Theatre, Liverpool to celebrate the birthday of the flagship Cunard liner RMS Queen Mary 2. The year ended with Christos starring in a Raymond Gubbay Christmas spectacular concert at The O2 arena (London) introduced by Mylene Klass and accompanied by the Royal Philharmonic Orchestra, the Royal Choral Society, Alison Jiear and Stephanie Corley (soprano's).

The new decade began as the previous year with Christos singing this time at the memorial service of Maggie Jones, who played Blanche Hunt in the long running British TV series Coronation Street. Much of the year was devoted to charity raising events throughout the UK (see 'Charity work' section), but during the summer Christos returned to Cheshire to perform in the popular Tameside Splendid Weekend classical concert. Autumn appearances included a return to Buile Hill Park to present and perform at the BBC Proms in the Park televised live concert featuring John Barrowman and Juliette Pochin and the Inspiration for Women Awards at Cadogan Hall, London.

2011 appearances included a performance at the Inspiration for Women Awards at Royce Hall, UCLA, Los Angeles US hosted by Alison Sweeney.

During 2012 Christos duetted with Jenny Williams at the Inspiration for Women Awards Cadogan Hall, London, Beverley Knight, Matt Cardle and Blake also appeared at the event.

In February 2013 Christos joined with other artists to create a new show 'Broadway and Beyond' with the intention of taking it to the corporate stage as well as smaller theatres around the country., during the summer the show was performed at Jodrell Bank supporting the Halle Orchestra.

During 2014 Christos was booked to perform on P&O Cruises by Garston Entertainment. He also headlined the Spirit of Salford Weekend with Ren Harvieu.

The beginning of 2015 saw Christos entertain on the P&O Cruises Oriana in the Caribbean and for Warner Leisure Hotels. On July 4, 2015 Christos performed at the Anglican Liverpool Cathedral to celebrate the Cunard Line 175th anniversary of the first ship to set out on a pioneering voyage to North America. Amongst the guest list was Thelma Barlow and Roy Barraclough, best known for their performances in Coronation Street, broadcasters Jennie Bond, one time royal correspondent for the BBC, Michael Buerk, Lord Prescott, who, before his political career, worked as a steward on a number of Cunard vessels, and Lord David Steel. in October 2015 a Star Ball at the Hilton hotel Deansgate with guests including Jorgie Porter, Nicole Barber-Lane, Tricia Penrose and Ray Quinn saw Christos appear as a surprise singing waiter. He also formed the duo to be known as Il Destino (Classical Crossover Duo) with musical theatre performer Adam Lacey.

In January 2016 Christos embarked on the cruise ship RMS Queen Mary 2 to sing with mezzo-soprano Danielle Louise Thomas, following this while continuing to develop the duo Il Destino (Classical Crossover Duo) he performed regularly on cruise ships, for Warner Leisure Hotels. and in Guernsey.

In 2019 Christos made his debut as a Music Director at the Blackpool Grand Theatre in a production of Alice in Wonderland

=== TV and radio ===
In 2005 Christos performed on an ITV Christmas Eve service from Norwich Cathedral with Rick Astley and Hayley Westenra.

During 2006, he performed on BBC 1's Songs of Praise show, appeared on ITV in an Easter Service, the ITV lunchtime chat show Today with Des and Mel, and on a special ITV Act of Worship Peace Service again from Norwich Cathedral.

He also performed on BBC Radio 2's long-running Friday Night is Music Night show, and was a judge on the BBC Radio 2's Young Chorister of the Year competition

Since 2007 he has been a guest TV presenter for Channel M in Manchester and began his own radio show, Sacred Thoughts, on Premier Christian Radio. In 2008 Christos began presenting a weekly popular music show every Sunday afternoon called "Why We Love" for BBC Radio Lancashire, in which he dissects songs of a variety of genres to explore, from a musical point of view, their success and popularity. Due to BBC Local Radio cuts the Christos show will end after 2012. 2009 and 2010 saw him perform at BBC Proms concerts which were broadcast live on BBC Television via the Red Button During 2011 Christos appeared fleetingly with Jenny Williams on Britain's Got Talent, their performance being farcically interrupted when a dog strayed on to the stage.

=== Sporting events ===
Christos has performed at a number of high-profile sporting events, including appearances at the Powergen Rugby Cup Final, the 2009 England vs Scotland 6 Nations Championship Rugby Union game at Twickenham along with Jonathan Ansell, the Heineken Cup Final at the Millennium Stadium in Cardiff and was credited as the first man to sing at the new Wembley Stadium. In 2008 he sang at the opening ceremony of the FINA World Swimming Championships at the Manchester Evening News Arena, and also at a tribute to some of Great Britain's Olympic and Paralympic medalists, including three times cycling gold medalist Chris Hoy. Other sporting venues he has performed at are Old Trafford the home of Manchester United F.C., the City of Manchester Stadium, the Reebok Stadium Bolton, Edgeley Park home of Stockport County and Sale Sharks, Deepdale home of Preston North End, Boundary Park home of Oldham Athletic and The Willows former home of his local Rugby league team Salford City Reds.

=== Charity work ===
Charities Christos has supported include The Red Cross, The Kirsty Howard's Appeal, The Prince's Trust, Help The Aged, Variety, the Children's Charity, Alder Hey Children's Hospital, the Five Stars Scanner Appeal for Royal Manchester Children's Hospital and in 2009 joined forces with the prestigious Harold Riley, a protégé of LS Lowry, to create a limited edition CD of the Ewan MacColl track Dirty Old Town, to be sold in aid of Christie Hospital. During 2010 Christos campaigned for the charity Leukaemia and Lymphoma Research by singing at numerous department stores, shopping centres, theme parks and train stations nationwide. Christos continued his countrywide charity tour during 2011 and 2012 to include Macmillan Cancer Support Breakthrough Breast Cancer and Help for Heroes, during 2011 he also performed at a charity concert in Portugal hosted by Sir Cliff Richard. Since 2009 Christos and singing partner Jenny Williams have been touring the UK for the 'Sing for Life' Campaign. They have been serenading the public at major shopping centres raising money for Breakthrough Breast Cancer. To-date this year (2012) alone stands at over £100,000.

=== Testimonials ===
Testimonials from several people including renowned conductor/composer Carl Davis and actor Robert Powell can be found on the following link;

=== Coeliac disease ===
Christos first began to experience stomach problems in October 2006, with the pain severe enough to cause problems with his singing. On the way to a concert in Scotland in November he had a complete blackout. The results of blood tests in March 2007 confirmed he was suffering from Coeliac disease, an autoimmune disease that can only be treated by the strict removal of gluten from the diet.

=== Other ===
Christos is a distant cousin of singer George Michael. He has been vocal coach to cricketer Andrew Flintoff. Although an avid Manchester City F.C. fan, Christos sang at Manchester Cathedral for the wedding of Manchester United F.C. star Gary Neville

== Discography ==
Singles:

- "Dirty Old Town" limited edition CD (2009)

Albums:

- Northern Light (2005)
- The Opera Album 2006 (2006) features "Caruso"
- A Treasury of Hymns (2006) features "Jerusalem"
- Manchester City: The Album (2005) features "Blue Moon" and "City Till I Die" – a variation of Funiculì, Funiculà
- The Number One Classical Album 2006 (2005) features "Jubilate Domum"
- A Classic Christmas (2006) features "Jubilate Domum"
- Songs for Sunday (2007) features "Jerusalem"
- The Number One Classical Album 2008 (2007) features "Non ti scordar di me"
- Poetry Serenade (2008)
- The Classical Album 2009 (2008) features "Mamma (song)"
- Classic Voices 2010 (2009) features "Una furtiva lagrima"

== See also ==
- List of people diagnosed with coeliac disease
