= H. Ogden Wintermute =

American journalist (1895–1964)

Henry Ogden Wintermute Sr. (29 November 1895, Mount Vernon, Ohio – 29 May 1964) was an American writer and historian.

He wrote a biography of minstrel show pioneer Dan Emmett. The book, Daniel Decatur Emmett, was published in 1955. Wintermute collected many of Emmett's effects and manuscripts. After Wintermute's death, these became the property of the Knox County Historical Society in Ohio.

He was for many years editor of the American Antiques Journal.
