= Song book =

Book containing lyrics for songs

A song book is a book containing lyrics for songs. Song books may be simple composition books or spiral-bound notebooks. Music publishers also produced printed editions for group singing. Such volumes were used in the United States by piano manufacturers as a marketing tool.

Song books containing religious music are often called hymnals; books containing the music for hymns with minimal, or no words, are sometimes called tune books.

== See also ==
- Great American Songbook
