= Mandolin-banjo =

8 string banjo played and tuned like a mandolin

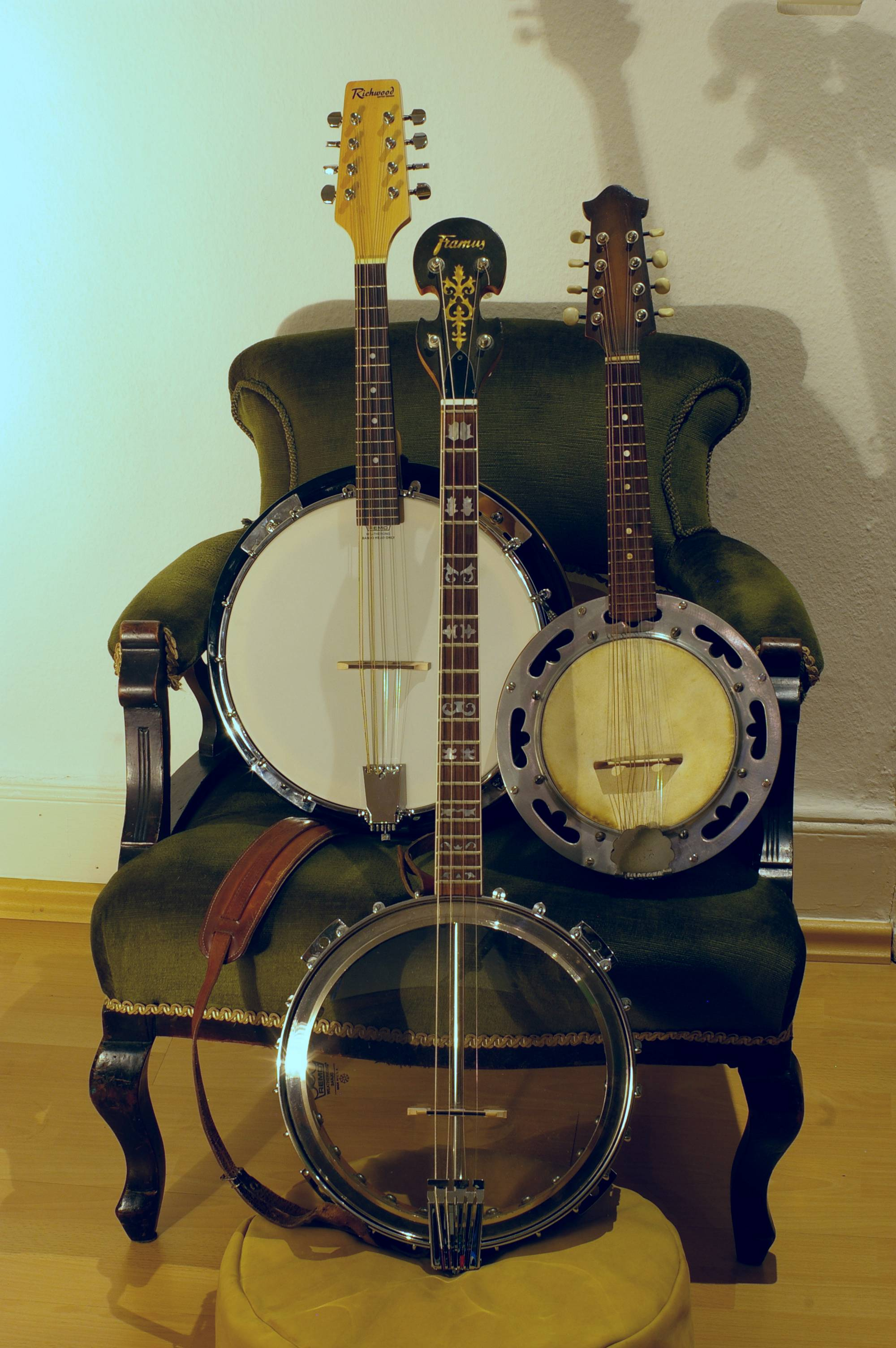
Two styles of mandolin-banjo, showing a large and small head, with a full size, four-string banjo (bottom)

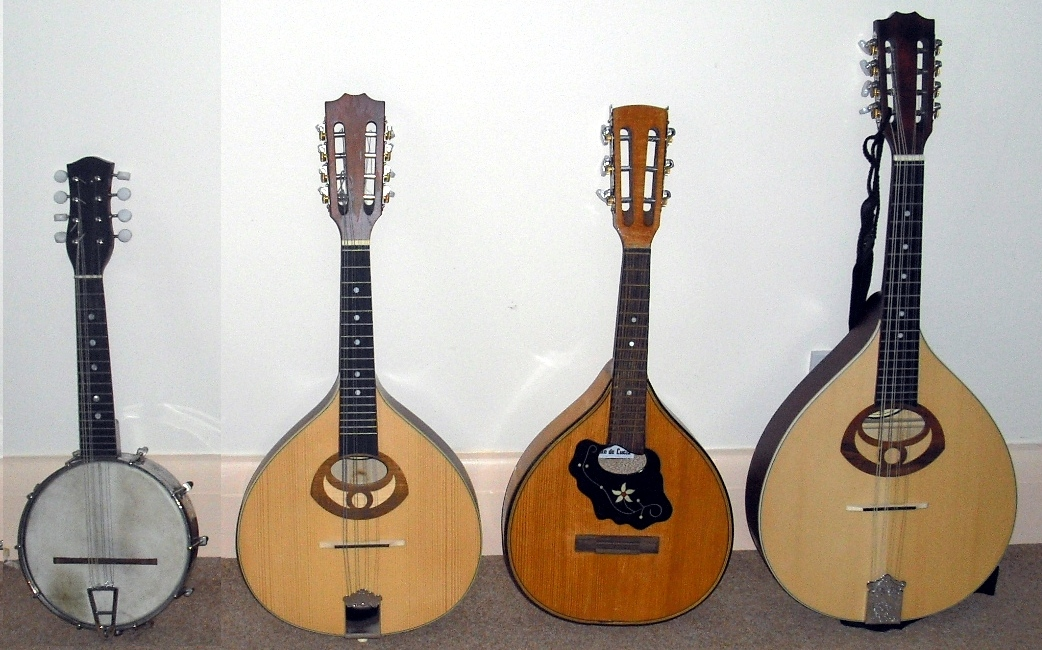
L-R - Banjo-mandolin, standard mandolin, 3-course mandolin, Tenor mandola

The mandolin-banjo is a hybrid instrument, combining a banjo body with the neck and tuning of a mandolin. It is a soprano banjo. It has been independently invented in more than one country, variously being called mandolin-banjo, banjo-mandolin, banjolin and banjourine in English-speaking countries, banjoline and bandoline in France, and the Cümbüş in Turkey.

The instrument has the same scale length as a mandolin (about 14 inches); with 4 courses of strings tuned identically to the violin and mandolin (low to high: GDAE). The movable bridge stands on a resonant banjo-like head typically 10 inches in diameter and currently usually made of plastic. Originally heads were made of skin and varied in diameter to as small as five inches. Larger heads were favored, however, as they were louder, and thus more audible in band settings.

== Origins ==
Inventors were experimenting to create amplified instruments in the days before electric amplification. The first patent for a mandolin-banjo was taken out in 1882 by Benjamin Bradbury of Brooklyn. The name banjolin was first patented by John Farris in 1885. The instrument was popularized prior to the 1920s, when the tenor banjo became more popular. In the heyday of mandolin orchestras and banjo bands (late 19th–early 20th century), all sorts of instruments were produced. The mandolin-banjo is one of the hybrids that resulted. It enabled mandolinists to produce a banjo sound without having to learn that instrument's fingerings. The instrument adds the banjo's volume to the mandolin.

== Distinctions ==
=== Banjolin versus banjo-mandolin ===
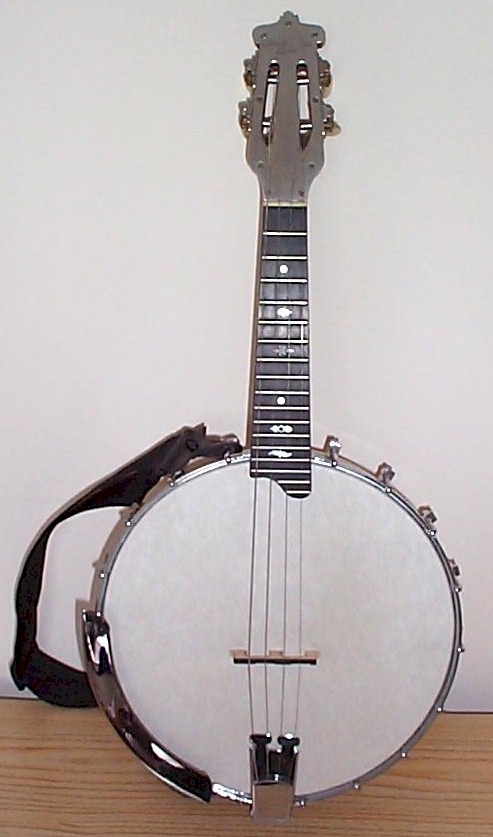
A banjolin with single strings like a violin and a mandolin fretboard

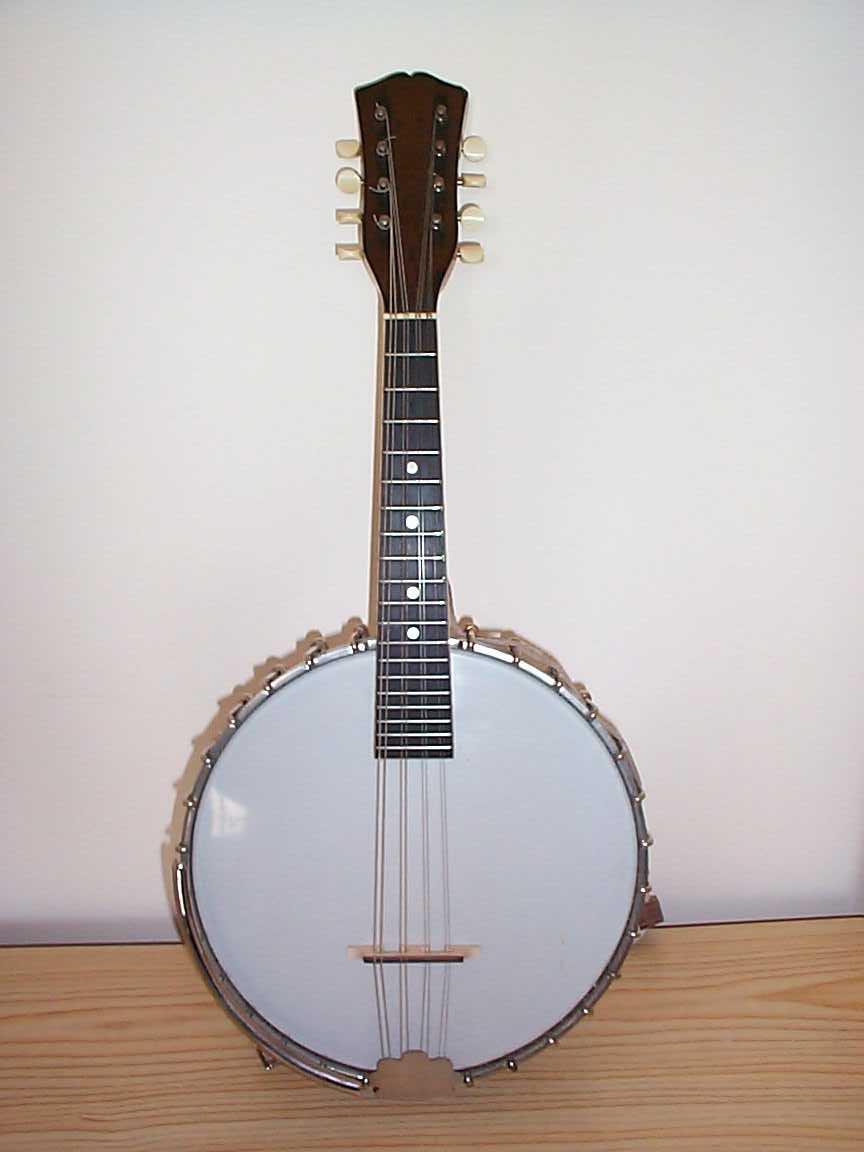
A Vega mandolin-banjo c. 1920 with four pairs of strings

The banjolin is different from the banjo-mandolin in the number of strings that it has. Banjolins today are supposed to have four strings instead of 8 strings (in courses or pairs). However, that distinction is not universal; John Farris patented an instrument with 8 strings calling it a banjolin by name in 1885. The Farris banjolin was offered in soprano, alto, tenor, and bass models. However, he "converted it to a four-string instrument", maintaining the mandolin and violin scale length and tuning (GDAE).

Banjo hybrids normally take their names from the Banjo- prefix, and then the second half of the other instrument's name, such as banjocello, banjo guitar, and banjo ukulele which implies the banjolin is a sort of mandolin/banjo hybrid. In the advertisement, Farris did not mention where the name came from, but did say that it was "fingered like the violin". In the United States, the term "melody banjo" was often used for four-string mandolin-banjos, which lacked the jazz-orchestra volume of the double-string instruments, but escaped their problems with tuning and overtones.

=== French banjoline versus mandolin-banjo ===
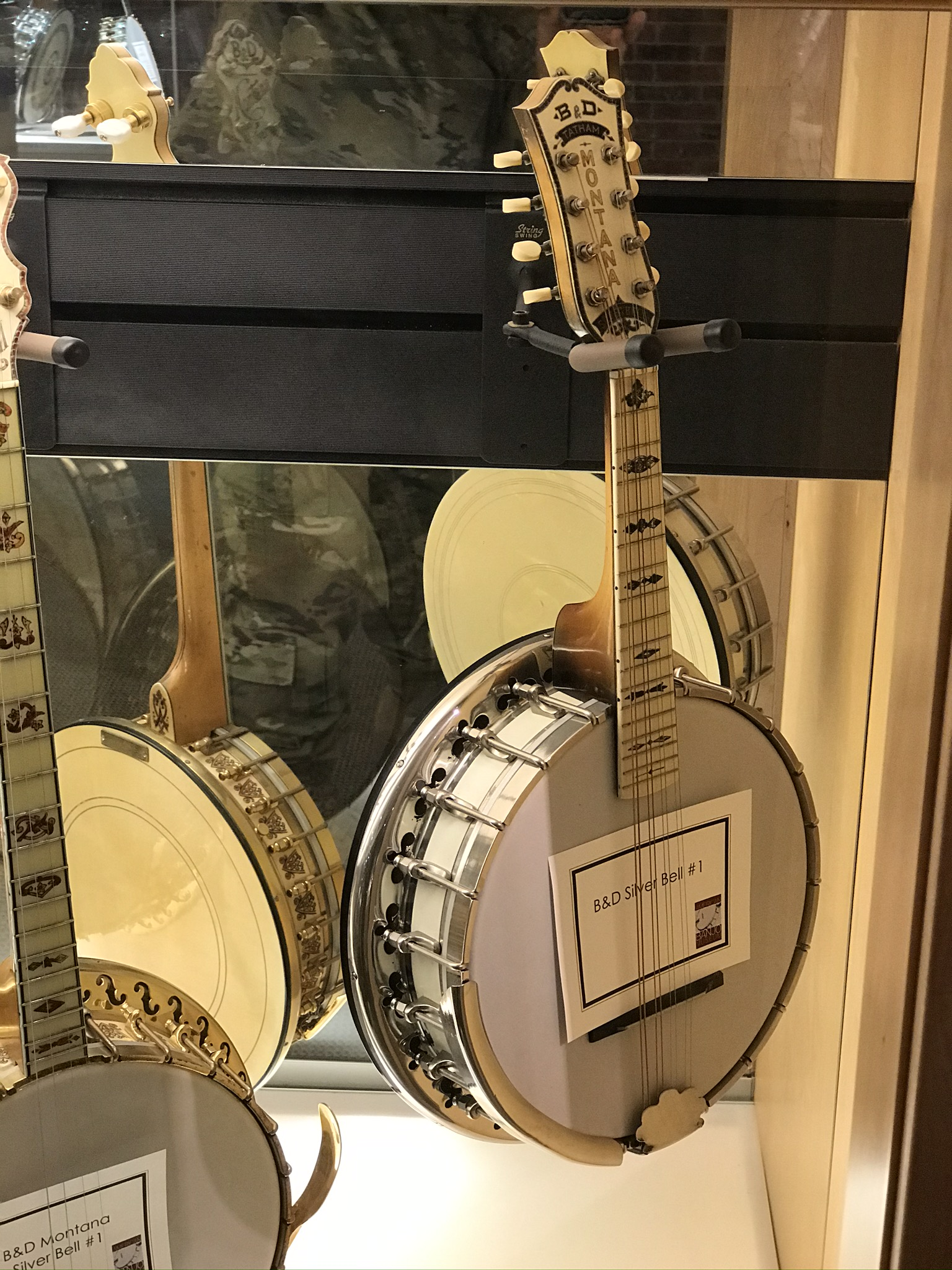
Bacon & Day "Montana Silver Bell" mandolin-banjo at the American Banjo Museum. This is a Jazz-Age banjo, the American closed-back type that Leonardi referred to. The closed back is a resonator, to project more sound outward.

In his 1921 book Méthode for the Banjoline or Mandoline-Banjo, Salvador Leonardi said that naming conventions between the United States and France had applied similar names to different instruments. In France and England, the Banjoline was an open-backed instrument, and the mandoline-banjo was a closed back instrument (with a metallic back that made a "tinny" metallic sound.

The American instruments he said were open backed, "and they call Mandoline-Banjo or Bandoline what we call Banjoline."

He said that amateurs and professionals alike preferred the single string instrument to the double stringed version, because of the "nice clear sound", which he said resembled the violin pizzicato.

=== Zithers ===
During the Hawaiian music craze of the early 20th century, instrument makers tried to capitalize on the widespread desire to learn an instrument. Makers of zithers applied the names of known instruments to their zithers as a theme. The Banjolin name was applied in this way to a type of bowed fretless zither.

== Companies ==
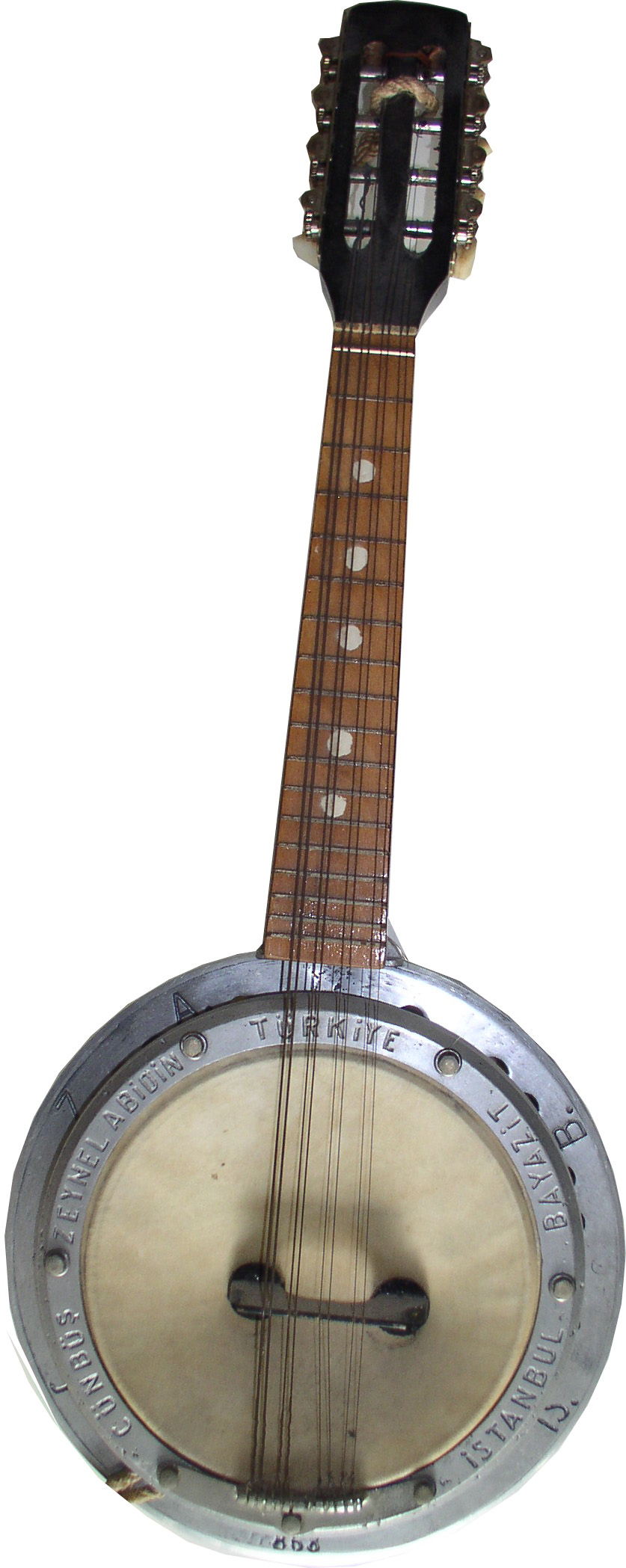
Mando-cümbüş, a Turkish banjo in the style of a mandolin. This instrument resembles the French mandolin-banjo, having a closed-resonator back that gives it a metallic sound.

=== Historic ===
Compared to mandolins and banjos, manufacture of mandolin banjos grew scarce in the late 20th century. Historically, mass produced mandolin-banjos were made by companies including Gibson, Weymann & Son of Philadelphia, Vega, S.S. Stewart, Lange, and the English company Windsor, who all built and sold 4 and 8 string banjos in the early 20th century.

=== Current manufacturers ===
Today mandolins-banjos are being manufactured by Vintage, GoldTone, Rogue, Cumbus, Morgan Monroe and Musikalia - Dr. Alfio Leone. GoldTone makes the MB-850+ Mandolin-Banjo, with a removable maple resonator (converting the instrument to an open-backed instrument). The selection is not large and the instruments are not common in stores. Morgan Monroe has recently made three models, the MM-MB1 Mandolin Banjo the MM-MB2 Mandolin Banjo, and the Banjolin DLX (8 strings). The Morgan Monroe banjos look like traditional mandolin-banjos and have wooden resonators. The Cumbus model has a spun aluminum resonator. Prices currently range from around US$150 to $700. In Italy, Musikalia manufactures three models of Mandolin Banjo, always with wooden resonator (mahogany, padouk or maple root wood veneered), animal skin, but gives an alternative between simple or double aluminium ring.

== Instruction books ==
Most instruction books concentrate on either the mandolin or the banjo. Mandolinists need more than just mandolin method because the physical differences between the two types of instruments creates problems to a novice learning to set up and tune the instrument. One of the first books to address the mandolin-banjo was Méthode pour Banjoline ou Mandoline-Banjo (Method for Banjolin and Mandolin-Banjo) by Salvador Leonardi.
