= American Banjo Museum =

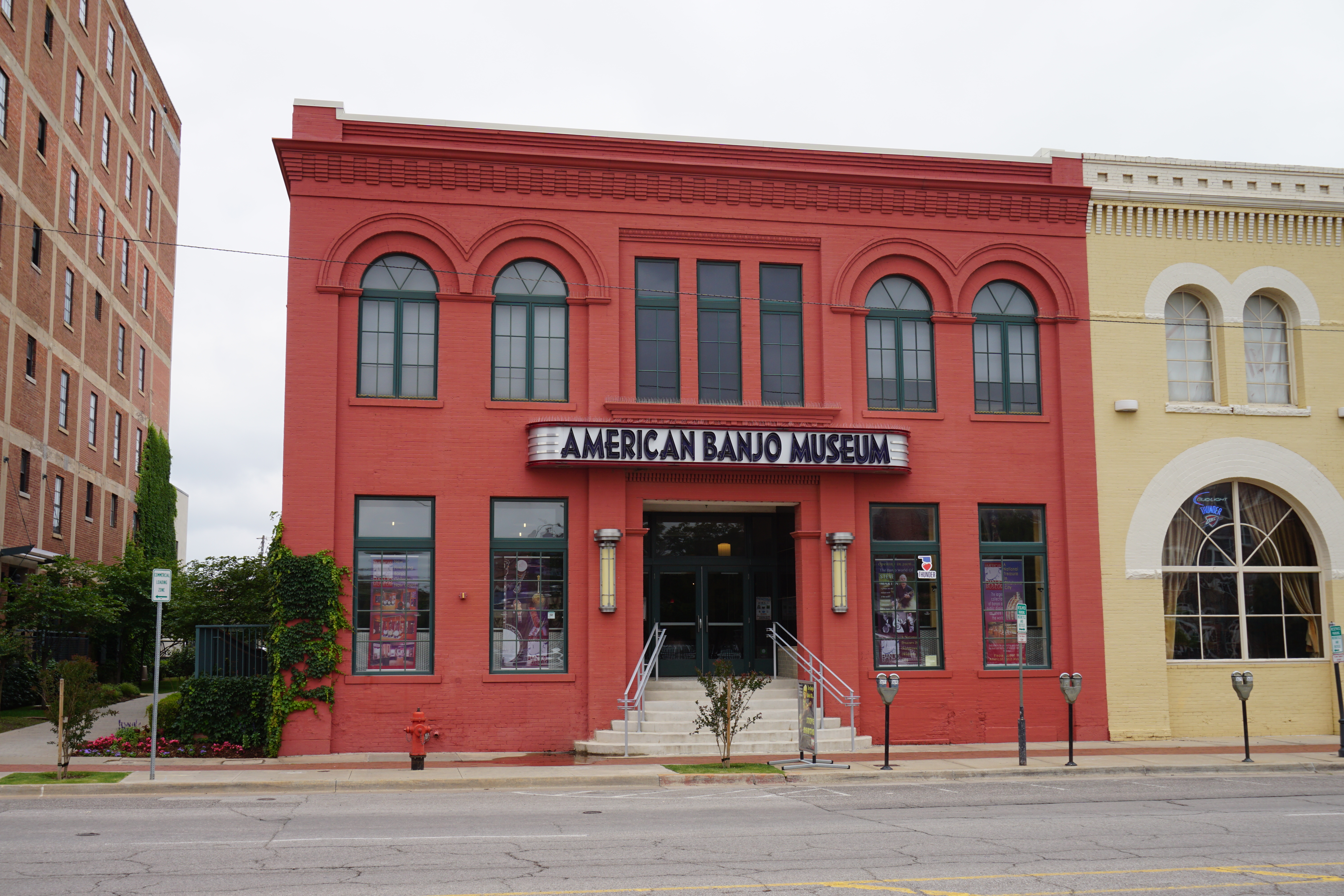
- American Banjo Museum
- Former name: National Four-String Banjo Hall of Fame Museum
- Established: 1998
- Location: 9 East Sheridan Avenue, Oklahoma City
- Coordinates: 35.466588°N 97.511545°W
- Type: Musical instrument museum
- Collections: banjos
- Collection size: 400+ instruments
- Founders: Jack Canine; Brady Hunt
- Executive director: Johnny Baier
- Website: americanbanjomuseum.com

The American Banjo Museum in Oklahoma City is dedicated to the history of the banjo. The museum's exhibits document the rise of the banjo from its arrival in North America via the Atlantic slave trade to modern times. The museum was founded in 1988 in Guthrie, Oklahoma, by Jack Canine and moved to Oklahoma City in 2009.

== Overview ==
Four and five-string banjos

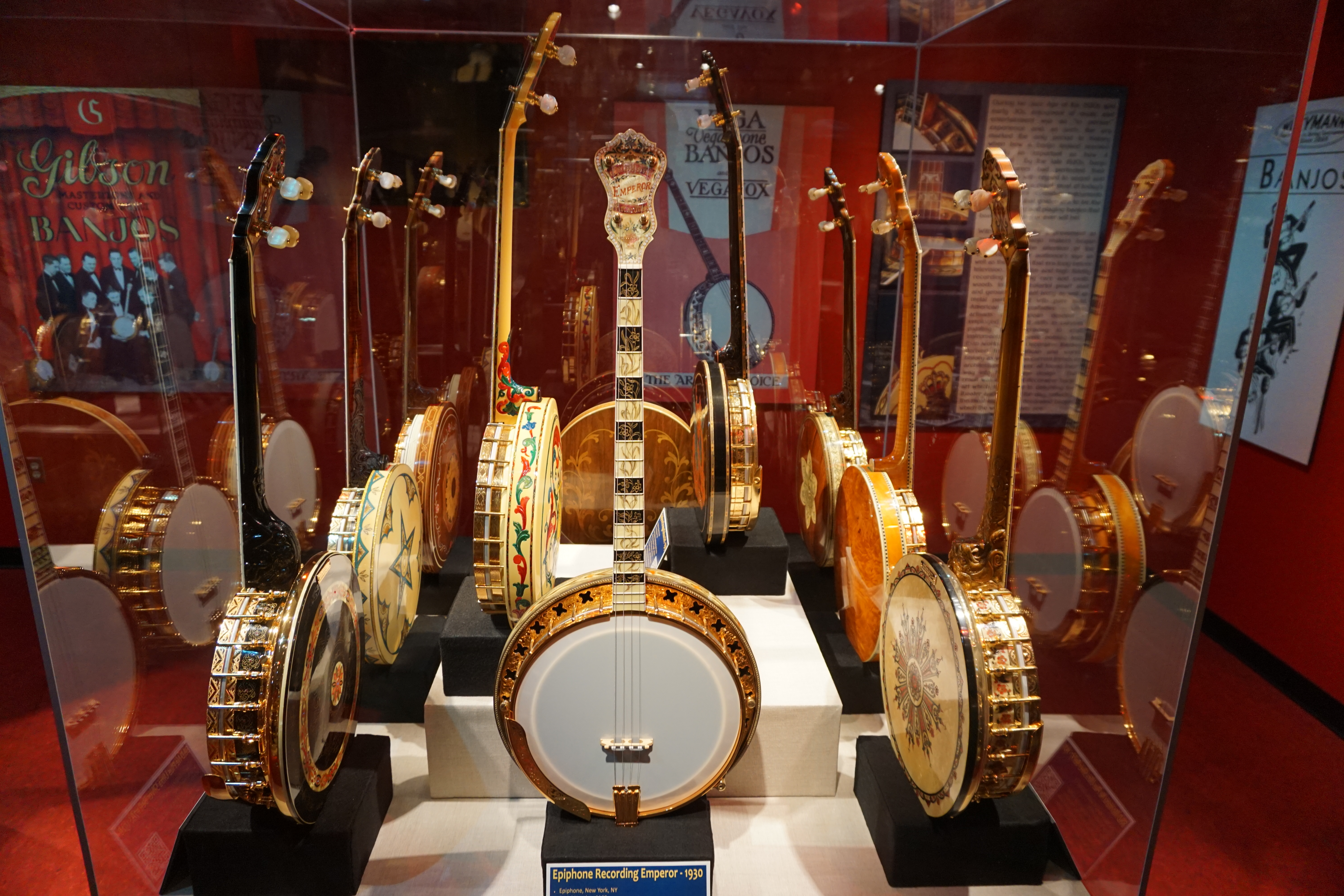
Selection of Jazz-Age banjos from the permanent exhibits of the American Banjo Museum. Foreground is an Epiphone Recording Emperor banjo from 1930. The ornate decoration and gold-plating is typical of Jazz-Age banjos.

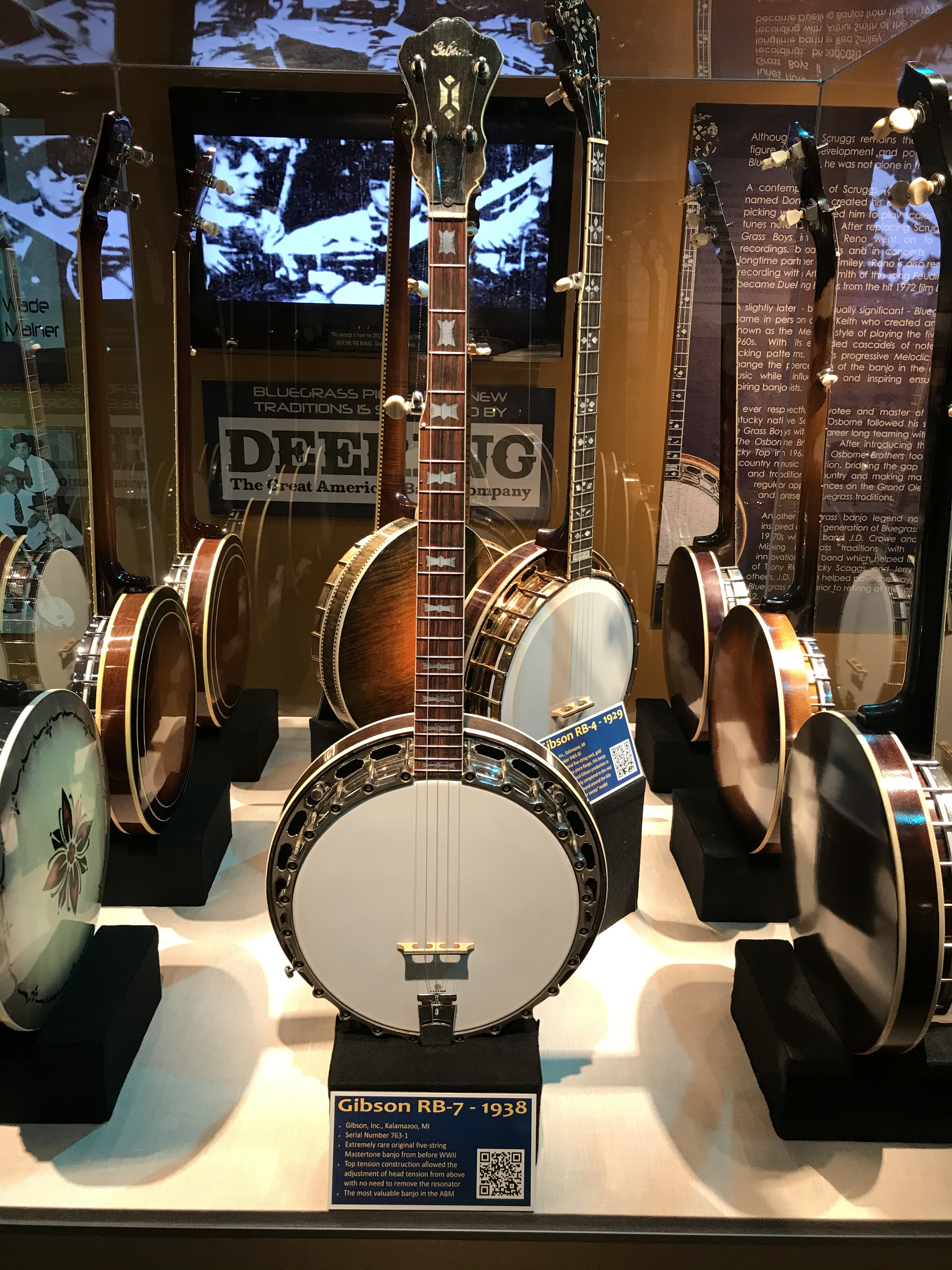
Prewar Gibson banjos: Gibson RB-7 (1938) banjo and Gibson RB-4 (1929) banjo.

The museum originated as a collaboration between Oklahoma attorney Brady Hunt and Indiana businessman Jack Canine, who founded the National Four-String Banjo Hall of Fame Museum in Guthrie, Oklahoma, in 1998.

Canine donated more than 60 "ornately decorated four-string tenor and plectrum banjos" to the museum. In a 2007 expansion, the museum acquired a European collection of 182 "jazz-age" instruments, making it one of the largest collections of banjos in the world. With the acquisition, the museum had "representation of every model from every major manufacturer of the jazz age, which ran from 1920 to 1940".

The museum was originally oriented towards four-string banjos but by 2013 its focus was widened to include five-string banjos. By 2018 the museum possessed more than 400 instruments and was able to exhibit more than 300 of them on two floors of galleries covering 21,000 sq ft (2,000 m^{2}). The museum's collections also contain historical recordings, film, video, printed music, instructional materials, and banjo-related ephemera and memorabilia.

== Collections ==
=== Cultural presentation ===
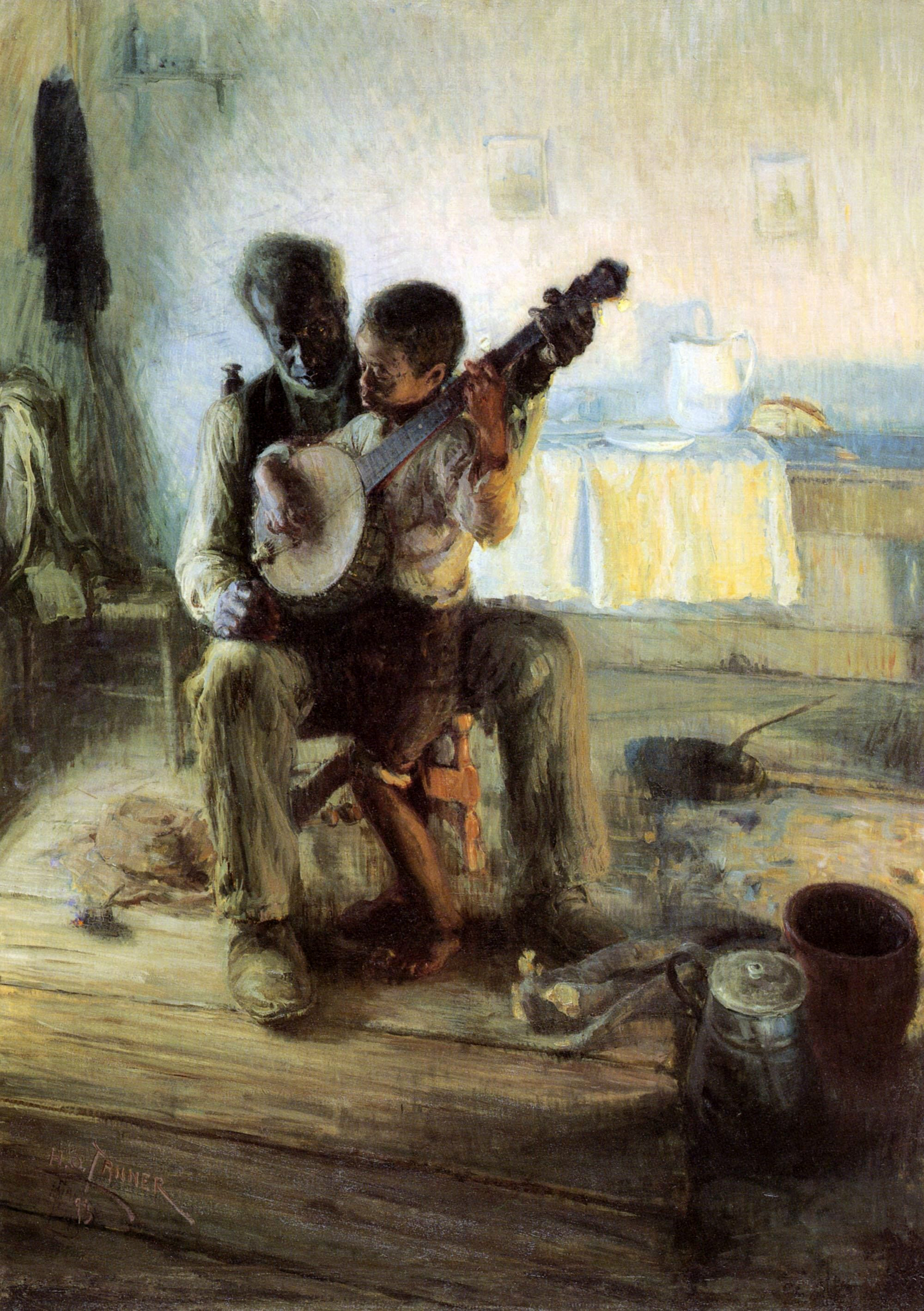
The Banjo Lesson was painted by Henry Ossawa Tanner in 1893 in Philadelphia.

The museum covers approximately 370 years worth of banjo history in the United States from the mid-1600s through the present.

Its first permanent exhibit focuses on the banjo's African-American origins and showcases the earliest American banjos that were used to accompany singing or dancing, which remained exclusive to Black culture for nearly 200 years. The display includes a three-dimensional recreation of the painting The Banjo Lesson by Henry Ossawa Tanner, in which an elderly African-American man teaches a young boy to play the banjo.

A second exhibit covers the transition of the banjo from African-American culture to mainstream American culture through the blackface-minstrel movement, popular compositions, and the standardization of banjos and their repertoire. Examples of Joel Walker Sweeney, Christy's Minstrels and the Ethiopian Serenaders, who performed in blackface, are included.

The classical movement after the Civil War is also covered, when the instrument "found acceptance in the parlors of middle upper-class America." Alfred A. Farland, Vess Ossman, Frederick Bacon and Fred Van Eps are held up as an example, of someone who took the banjo into the concert hall, playing the music of "master composers" in fingerstyle, taken from the European classical guitar's fingerstyle. The instrument became a tool of social interaction, as college students formed banjo clubs and it was acceptable now for women to play the instrument.

A third multimedia display talks about the 1920s, ragtime and the era's dance-music culture, in which the banjo took on a central role comparable to that of the electric guitar in today's music, with banjo-playing stars such as Eddie Peabody, Harry Reser, and Roy Smeck. Ragtime set the stage for jazz and its dances, such as the Black Bottom, Charleston and the Lindy Hop. These dances could be accompanied by the four-string banjo played with a pick, which helped to provide a "rhythmic pulse" for the music. The Tango was also sometimes accompanied on the banjo.

A final display shows places in popular culture where the banjo survived through a resurgence in the post-World War II years, when it was played by musicians Earl Scruggs (bluegrass), Bela Fleck (jazz, rock, world music), Gerry O'Connor (Celtic and Irish music), Perry Bechtel (jazz, big band), Pete Seeger (folk), and Otis Taylor (African-American roots, blues, jazz).

== Instruments ==
Minstrel-era banjos

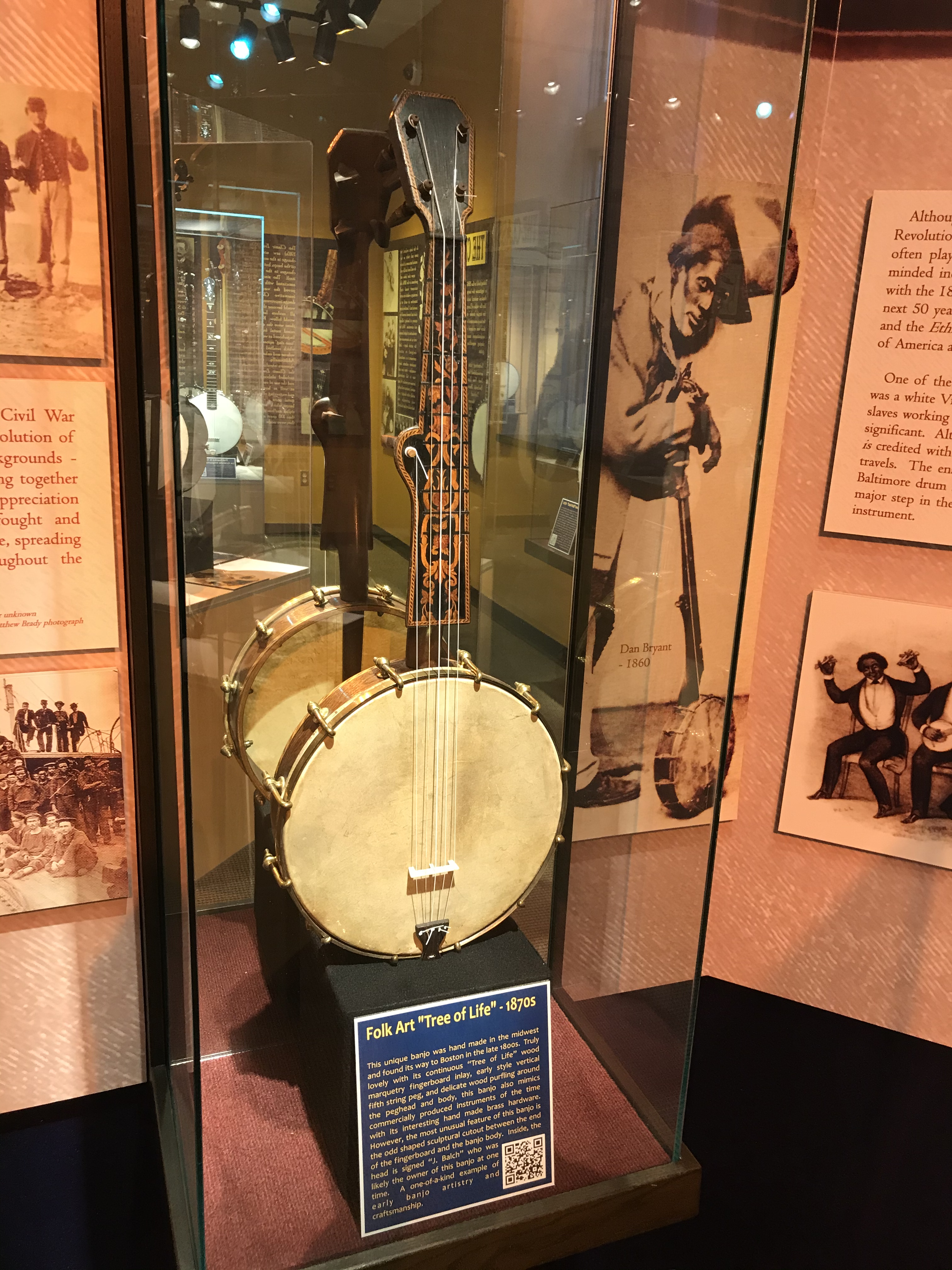
A "Tree of Life" banjo, midwestern United States, 1870s, is surrounded by pictures of performers in blackface, and Civil War soldiers and sailors posing with banjos.

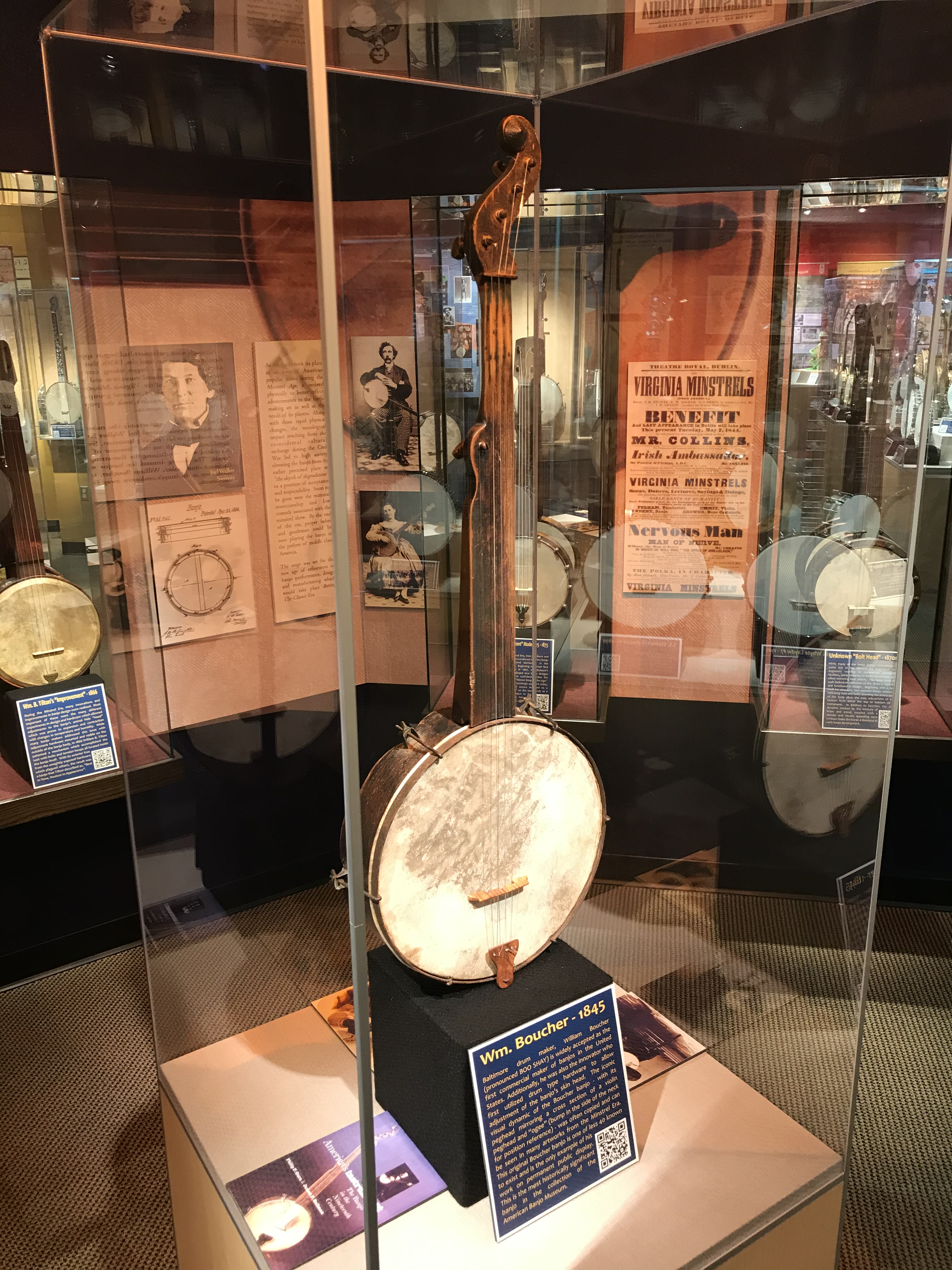
Banjo made by William Boucher in 1845. He is considered to be the first commercial manufacturer of banjos.

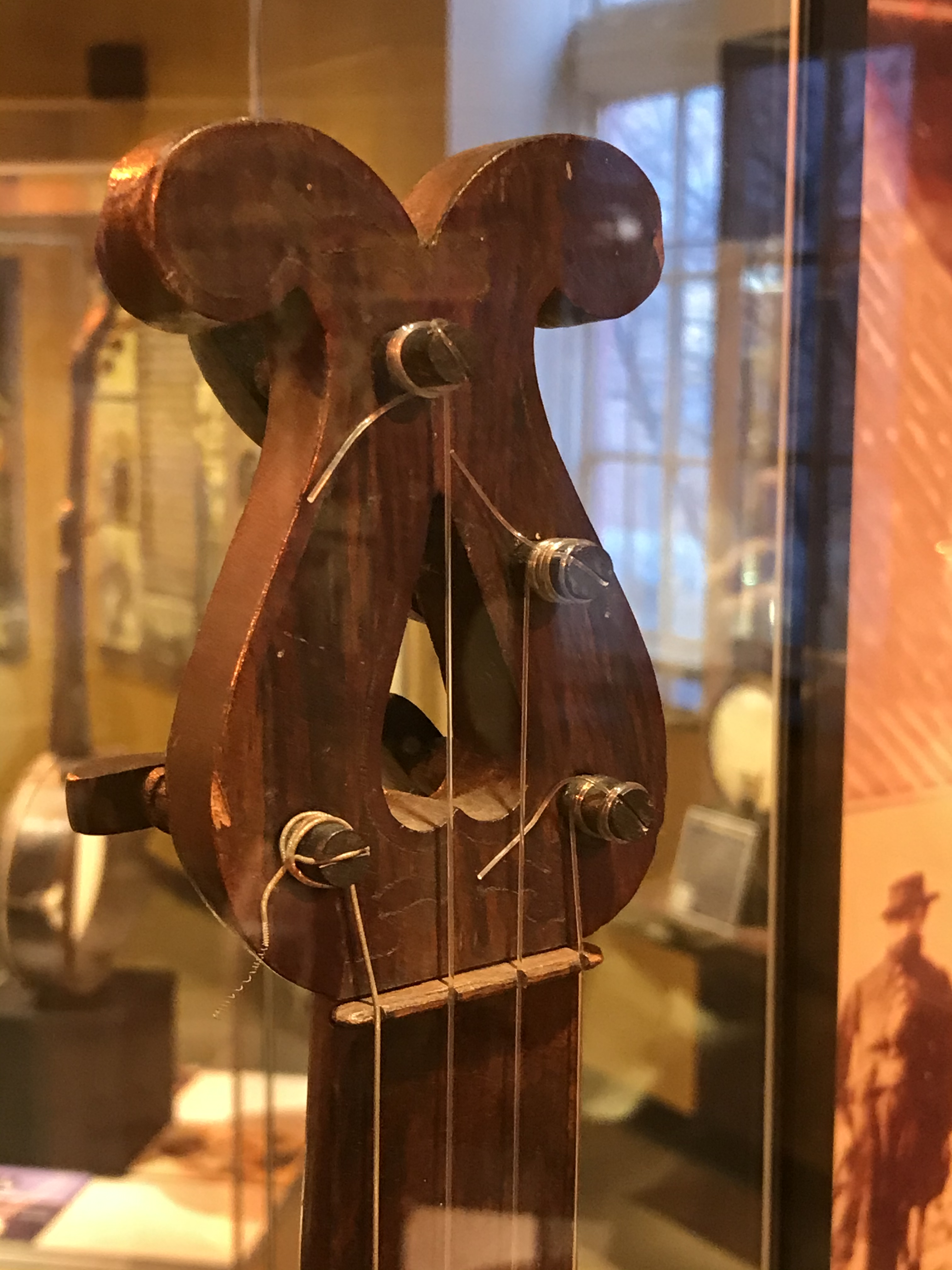
Double-scroll peghead from 1840s banjo, American Banjo Museum.

The museum displays instruments that demonstrate changing technology in banjos across more than 160 years from the 1840s through the present. The collection includes rare banjos made by pioneer manufacturers including the Bacon Banjo Company, Vega, Epiphone, S.S. Stewart, Gibson, J.H. Buckbee, Fairbanks and Cole, Ludwig, Weymann, Washburn and an electrified banjo by Les Paul. Modern brands on display include the Deering Banjo Company and Gibson. The banjo was important in several eras of American music, a reflection of the country's "changing tastes" in music. Instruments on the ground floor are presented chronologically by era.

=== Minstrel era, 1830s–1870s ===
By the beginning of the minstrel era in the 1840s, banjos had shifted away from the homemade folk instruments to instruments of a more modern style. Joel Walker Sweeney, a blackface performer who learned to play banjo from slaves, popularized the five-string banjo and used it in his minstrel performances. He encouraged drum maker William Boucher of Baltimore to make banjos for him to sell. The museum has a banjo from 1845 that was made by Boucher, who is "widely accepted as the first commercial maker of banjos in the United States" according to the museum's display placard.

The museum's permanent collection also includes an 1840s five-string banjo that has a peghead shaped like a lyre by an unknown luthier. Another pre-civil war banjo was made by A.B. Bullock in Rhode Island; the 1854-made fretless banjo has a metal body with bolts to adjust the tension of the skin head.

A post-Civil War banjo on display from the 1880s used a wooden hoop tacked to the instrument's body on the outside to adjust the skin-head's tension. An 1866 banjo made by William B. Tilton also used hoops and bolts inside the banjo head to adjust the tension on the banjo's skin. Another 1880s manufacturer represented is J.H. Buckbee of New York, who made musical instruments after the Civil War.

=== Classic era, 1880s–1910s ===
Classic banjos

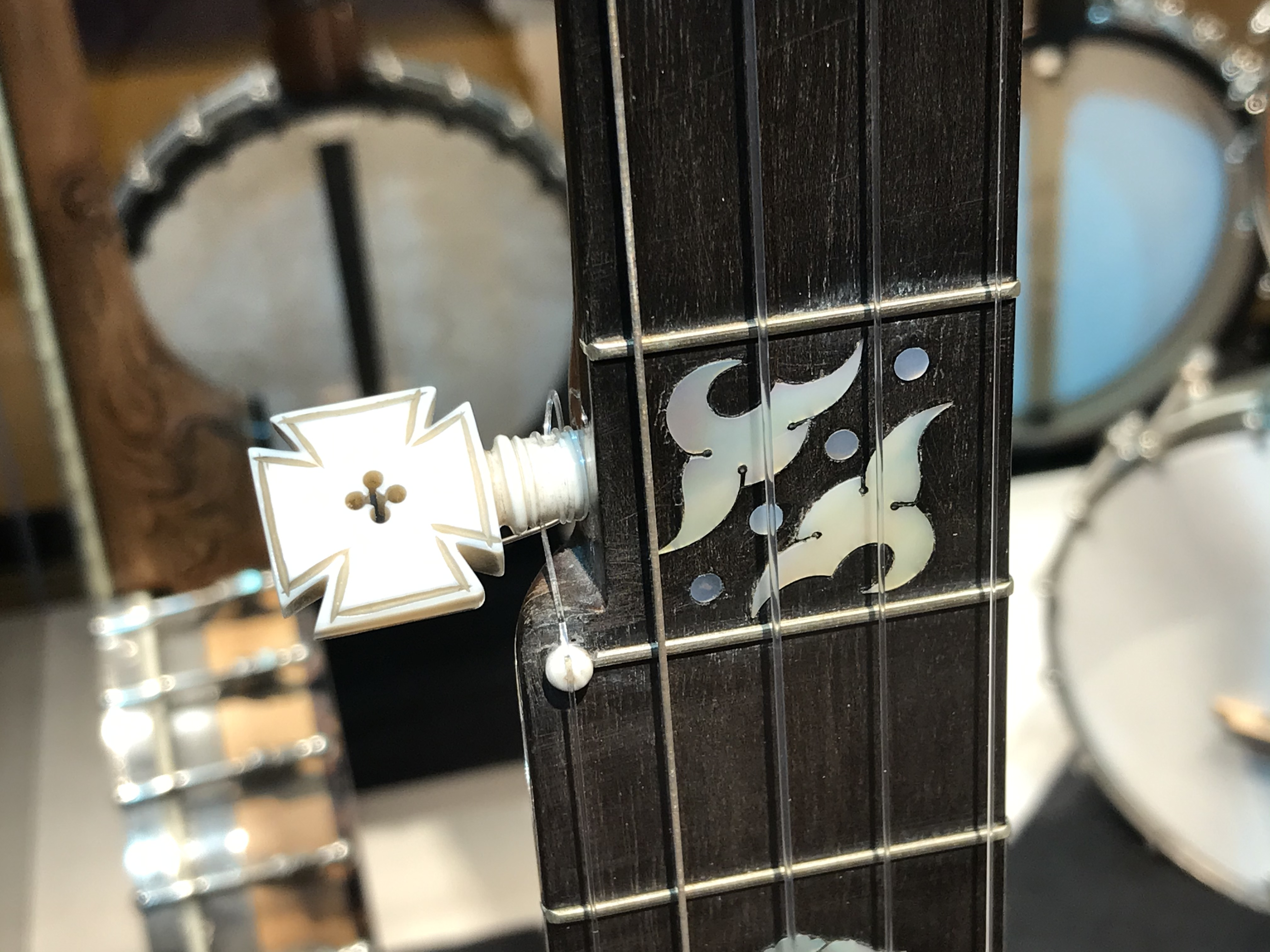
Carved ivory tuner from Fairbanks & Cole Le Grande Imperial banjo, 1889, American Banjo Museum

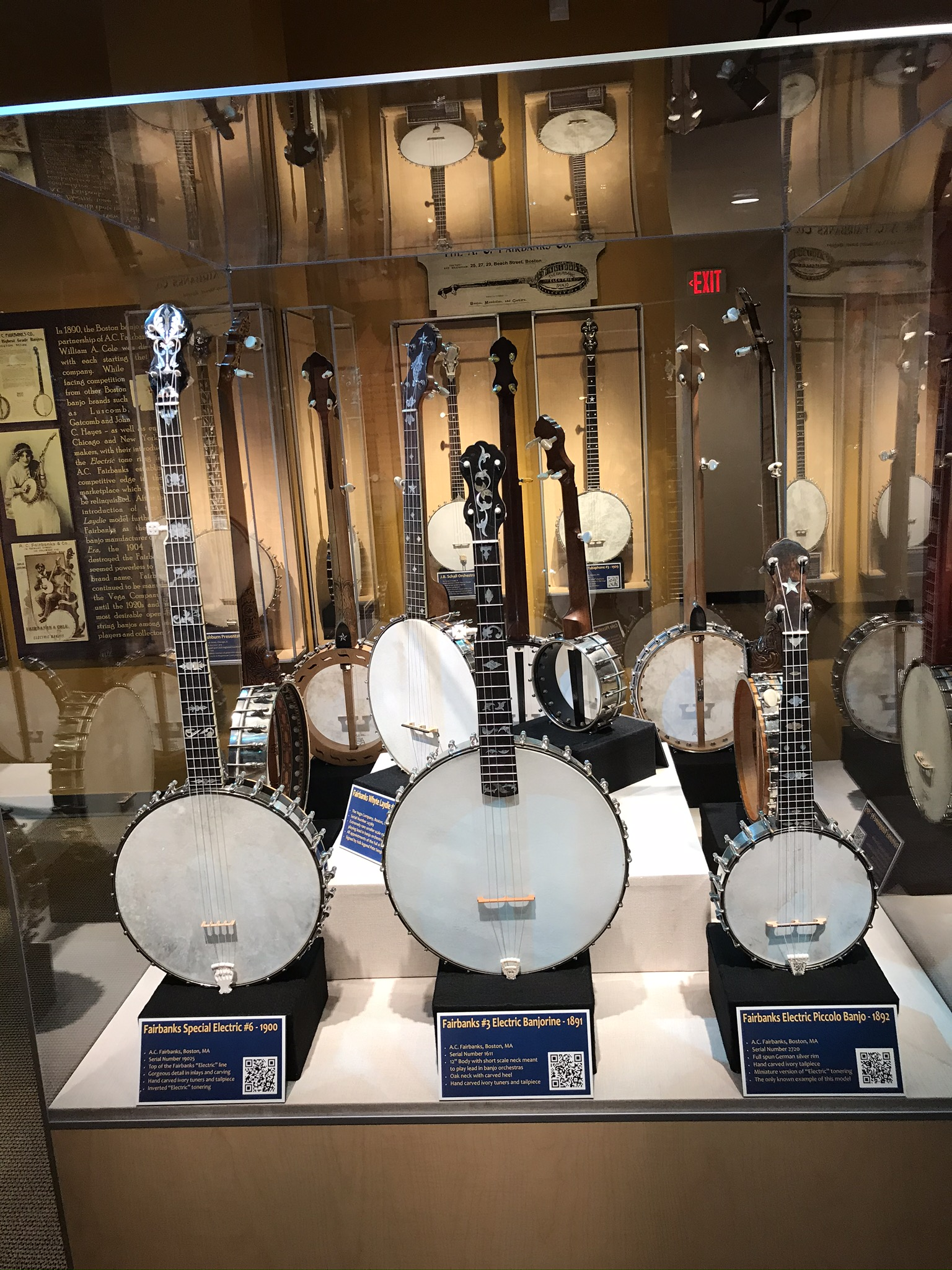
Fairbanks Special Electric #6, Fairbanks #3 Electric Banjorine, Fairbanks Electric Piccolo Banjo.

By the 1880s there was a movement to make the banjo "new and sophisticated". The socially elite felt the banjo was a "musically feeble gadget of the lower classes" but were also fascinated by it. Instructors included a multiple-finger playing technique, moving way from the banjo's traditional clawhammer stroke. Banjo clubs arose in college and universities, and the banjo was now seen as being suitable for members of the upper and middle classes to play. The American Banjo Museum's collections of banjos from the classical era include examples by S.S. Stewart, Fairbanks and Cole, Bacon, Washburn (Lyon and Healy, Chicago) and J.B. Schall (Chicago).

Jazz Age

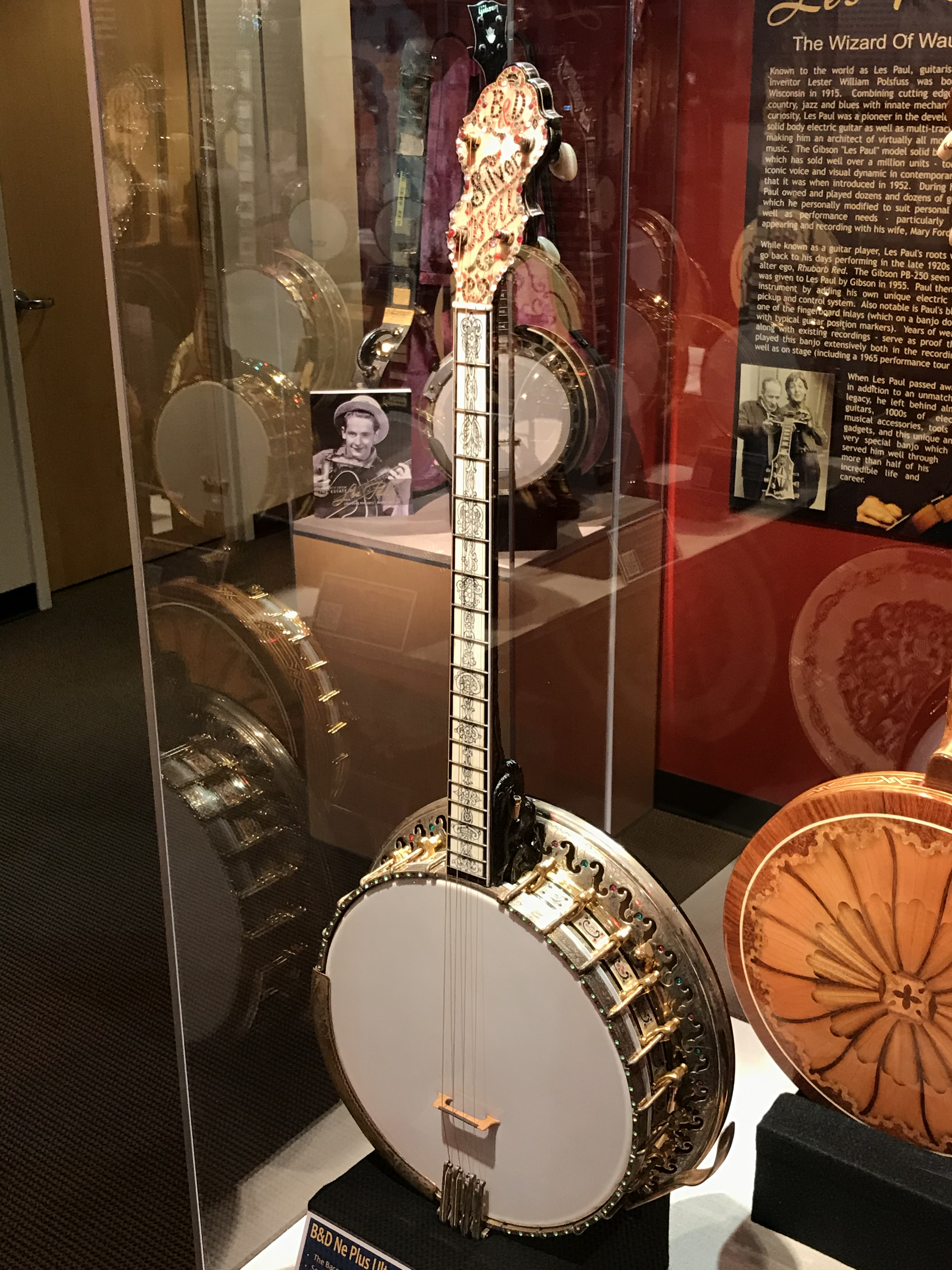
1928 Bacon and Day Ne Plus Ultra Silver Bell Number 9. This is 4-string tenor banjo with 19 frets.

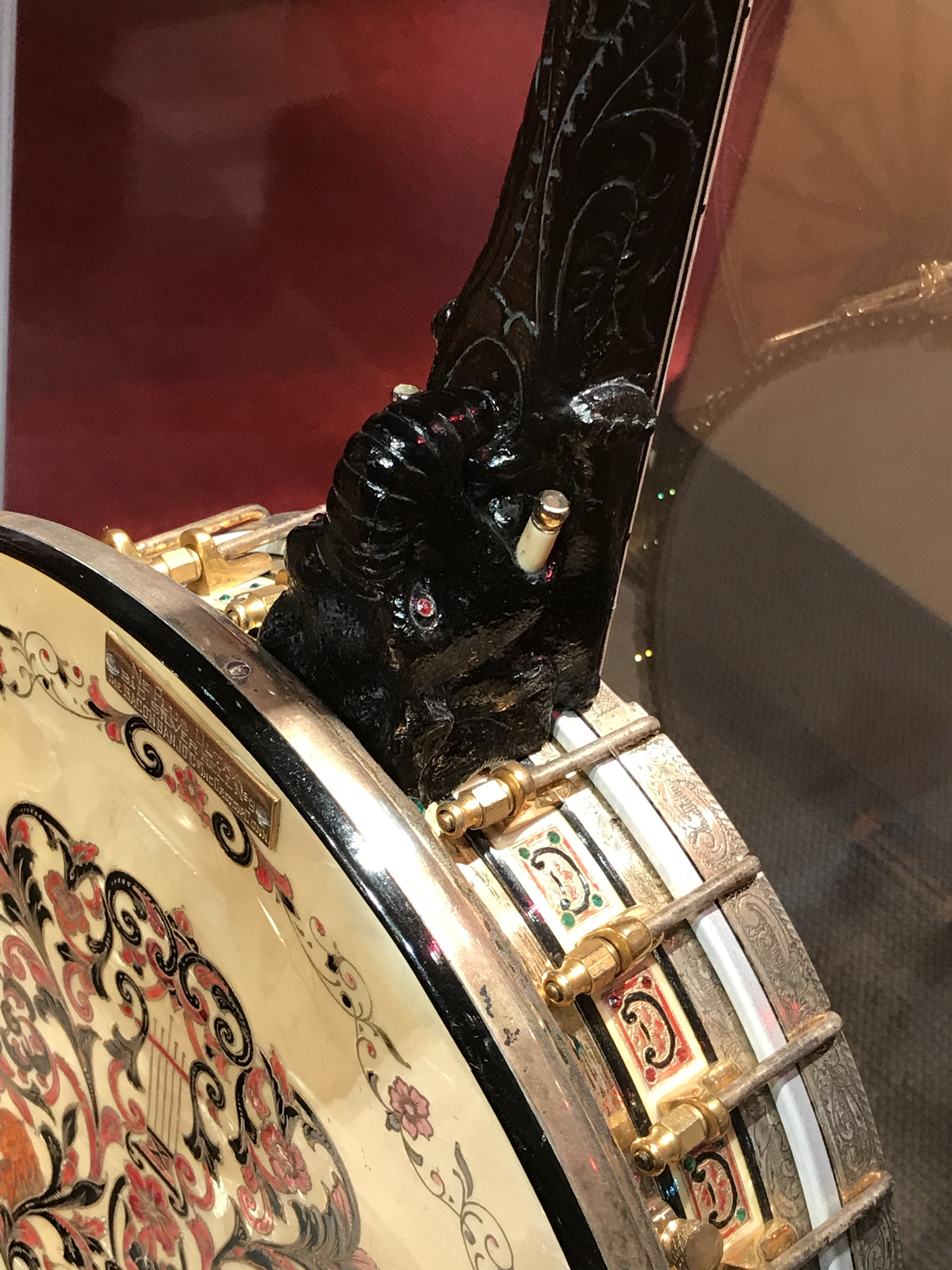
Jazz-Age luxury: carved elephant in ebony with ivory tusks, gold plating, engraving.

=== Ragtime era (1895–1919) and Jazz Age era (1910s–1930s) ===
In 1998, when the museum was founded, it was not trying to show all banjos. The musicians and collectors who started the project were focused on the four-string instruments of the early 20th century.

The four-string banjo arose from changing musical tastes. New music spurred the creation of "evolutionary variations" of the banjo, from the five-string models current since the 1830s to newer four-string plectrum and tenor banjos.

One of the most expensive instruments in the museum's collection dates from this era, a Gibson RB-7, made in 1938.

=== Bluegrass and Folk era ===
Folk and bluegrass

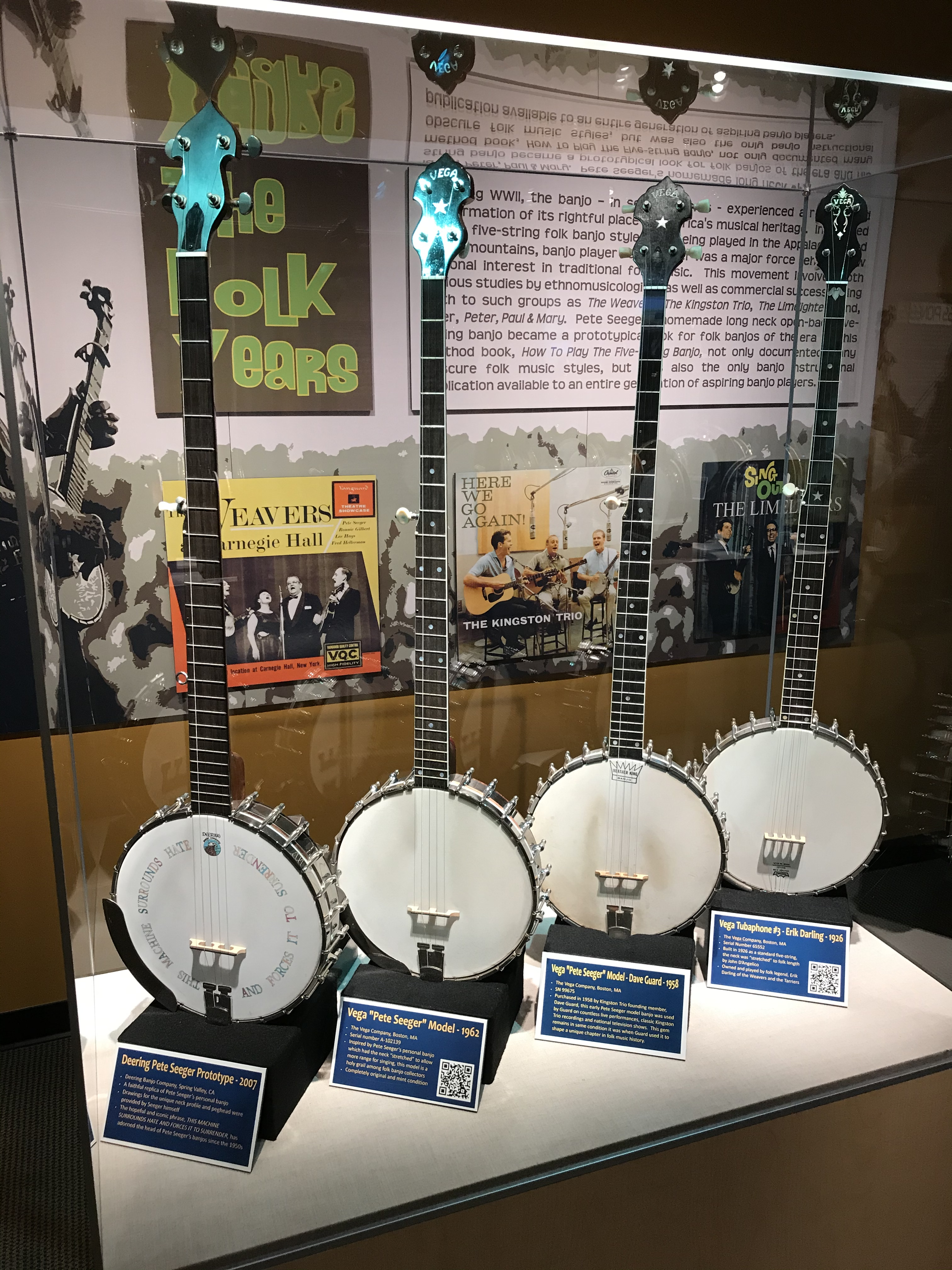
Pete Seeger had the neck lengthened on his banjo and inspired others to create long-necked banjos. (Far right) A banjo played by Erik Darling of the Weavers and the Tarriers. (Second from the right) A banjo played by Dave Guard of the Kingston Trio.

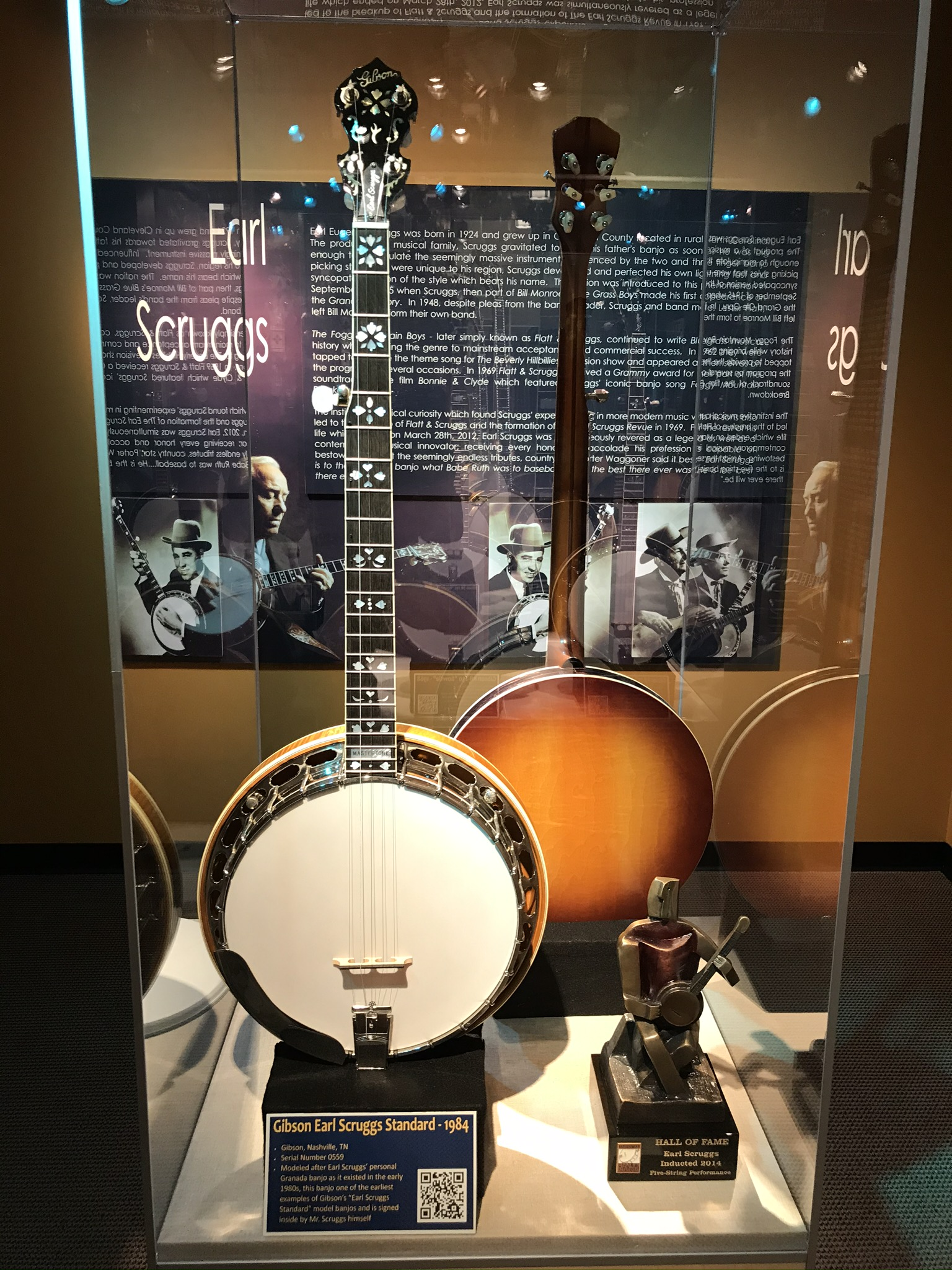
Gibson Earl Scruggs Standard banjo, modeled after his Gibson Granada, in the American Banjo Museum.

Although the banjo had been commercially made in Chicago, New York, Boston and Philadelphia for a national market, and probably thousands of banjos had been made in previous years, it largely disappeared, except in regions such as Appalachia and the Ozarks. It was very difficult to learn the banjo after World War II because most banjo manufacturers were out of business or had put aside their musical manufacturing for war-goods manufacturing. Music tastes had again changed; Big band music and the guitar were now in fashion, pushing aside the banjo. Banjos and their accessories such as strings and specialized picks were largely unavailable. Musicians Pete Seeger and Earl Scruggs helped reverse the situation and influenced banjo design; both musicians feature prominently in the museum.

The museum has instruments related to different stages of Earl Scruggs career. Scruggs' first five-string banjo was a Gibson RB-11; the museum obtained an identical instrument that was made in 1938. Scruggs' main banjo was a Gibson Granada, which he played even after Vega created a special banjo for him. He carried both on his tours but preferred his old Gibson to the newer Vega. The museum does not have Scruggs' Gibson Granada; that instrument is in Nashville at the Country Music Hall of Fame. The American Banjo Museum holds one of the banjos Gibson made, the Gibson "Earl Scruggs Standard" (1984), which is modeled after his Granada "as it existed in the early 1980s". The museum has two other Scruggs-inspired banjos; a "Vega Earl Scruggs Model" (1964) and his original Vega, which it acquired in 2018.

== Hall of Fame ==
As the museum extended its original focus on four-string banjos to incorporate all banjos, so did the hall of fame. The hall of fame expanded in 2013 to recognize contributions from five-string banjo players, allowing them to be recognized in "non-performance categories" and creating a category specific to them. Inductees into the American Banjo Museum Hall of Fame in 2018 include Bela Fleck (five-string performance), Borgy Borgerson (four-string performance), Jim Henson (promotion), Hub Nitsche and the Banjo Newsletter (instruction and education), and Eddie Collins (historical). The 2019 inductees include Alison Brown (five-string performance), Johnny Baier (four-string performance), Jimmy Mazzy (four-string performance), John Hartford (historical), Bob Snow (promotion) and Janet Davis (instruction and education).

== Special exhibits ==
=== Jim Henson ===
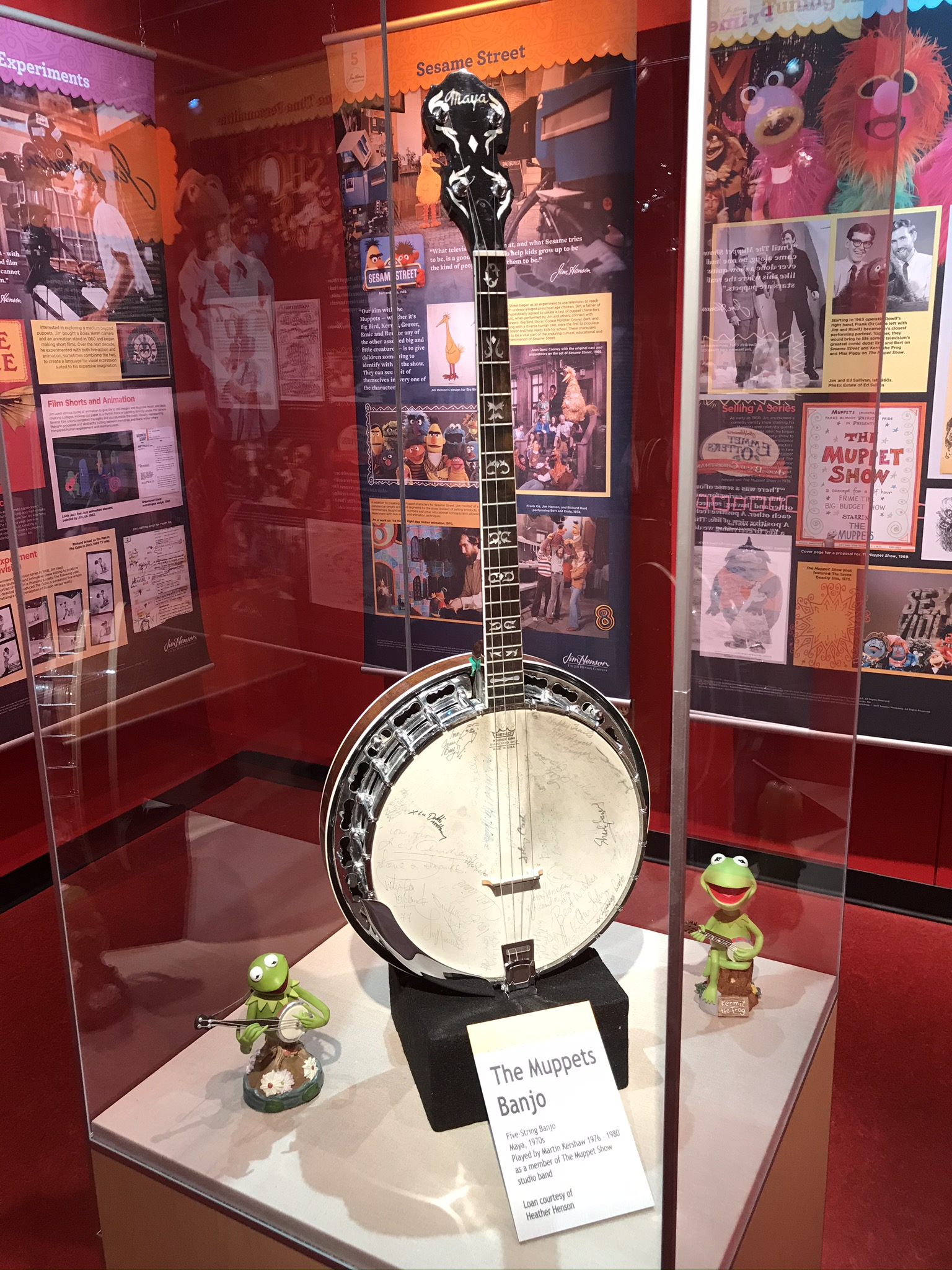
Martin Kershaw's Maya Banjo on display in an exhibit honoring Jim Henson at the American Banjo Museum.

Puppeteer Jim Henson was inducted into the American Banjo Museum Hall of Fame in 2018. From September 2018 into 2020, the museum exhibited "Jim Henson – Life and Legacy", which was curated by Karen Falk of The Jim Henson Company and featured the history and development of the Muppets. Henson represented the banjo in a positive manner in his programming. His guests on The Muppet Show included Roy Clark and Steve Martin, and in doing so, "presented the music and visual dynamic of the banjo to an international audience in the most entertaining and positive manner imaginable."

The exhibits showed Henson's work throughout his career and included video footage of Kermit the Frog in his first banjo-playing appearance from Sam and Friends. A later clip of Kermit playing "Rainbow Connection" in The Muppet Movie let viewers see the Muppet and his banjo from another era. Another banjo themed clip shown from The Muppet Show episode 123 was of Henson's parody of himself as a Muppet, playing as part of the Country Trio bluegrass band and singing "You Don't Want My Love", a Roger Miller song.

The Henson family allowed the museum to display one of the Kermit the Frog Muppets and Heather Henson opened the exhibit.

Also on display was a five-string Maya banjo that provided the sound for the Muppet banjos. It was formerly owned and played by Martin Kershaw, and had appeared on around 7,000 recordings with performers such as "Frank Sinatra, Bing Crosby, Bob Hope, James Cagney, Peggy Lee, Danny Kaye, Fred Astaire and Sammy Davis Jr." Kershaw played his banjo as a member of the Muppet Show studio band and provided the music the audience heard Kermit the Frog play. His Maya banjo was signed by many musicians, including Julie Andrews, Gene Kelly, Roy Rogers, Johnny Cash, Elton John, Diana Ross and Peter Sellers.

=== Steve Martin ===
Steve Martin banjos

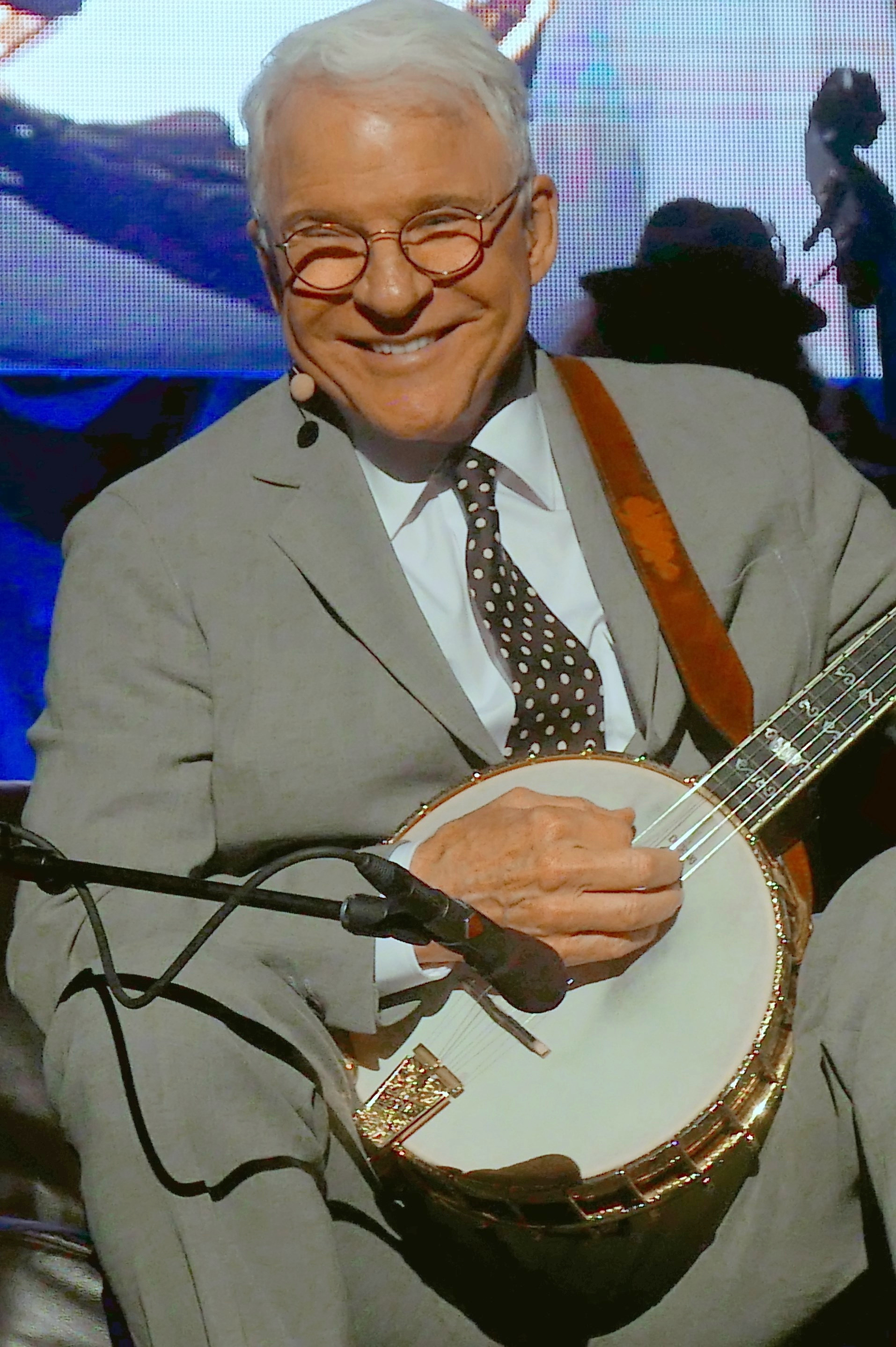
Steve Martin

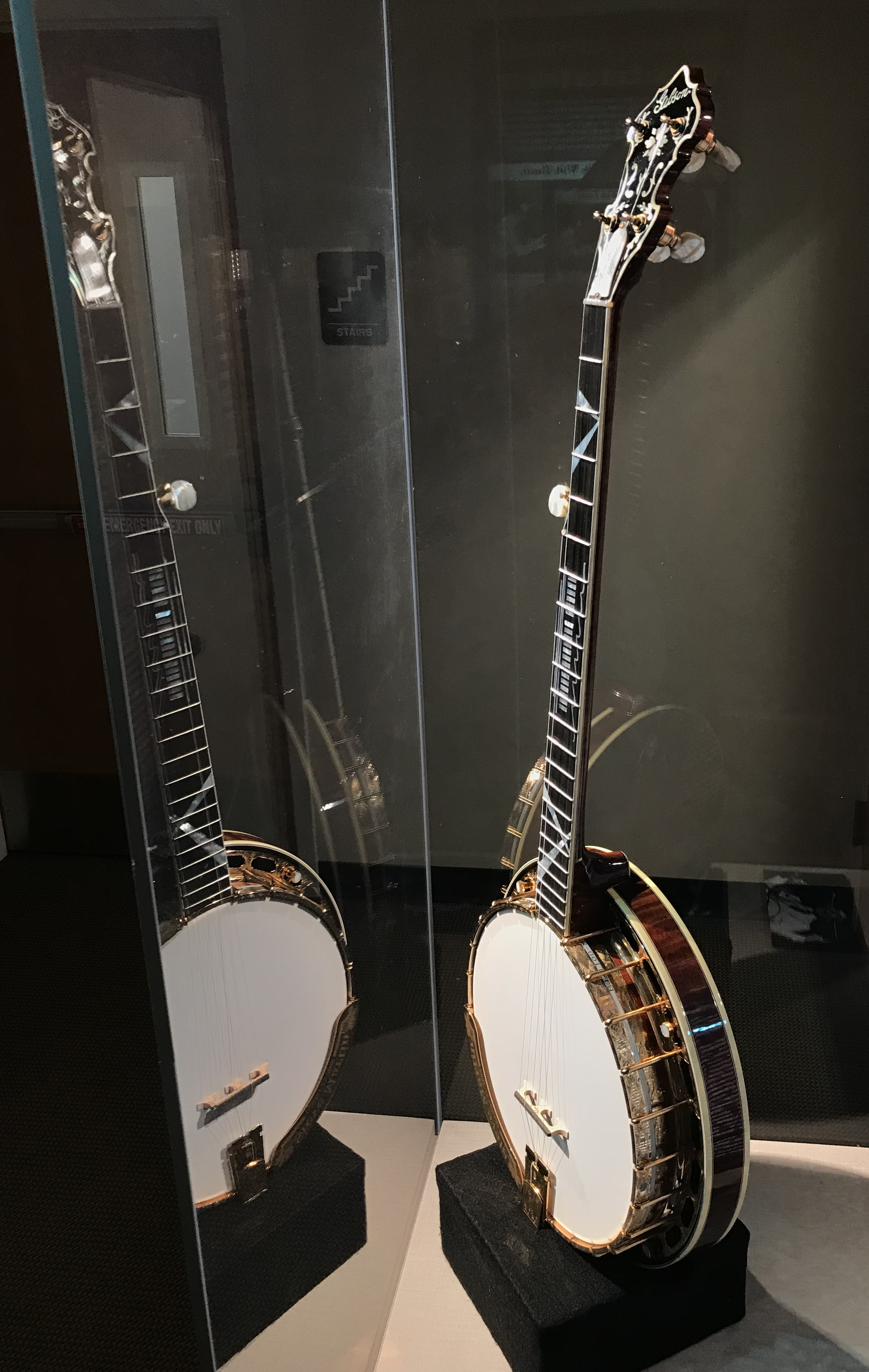
Steve Martin's custom Gibson banjo, custom built and given to him as the 2005 Mark Twain Prize for American Humor from the Kennedy Center.

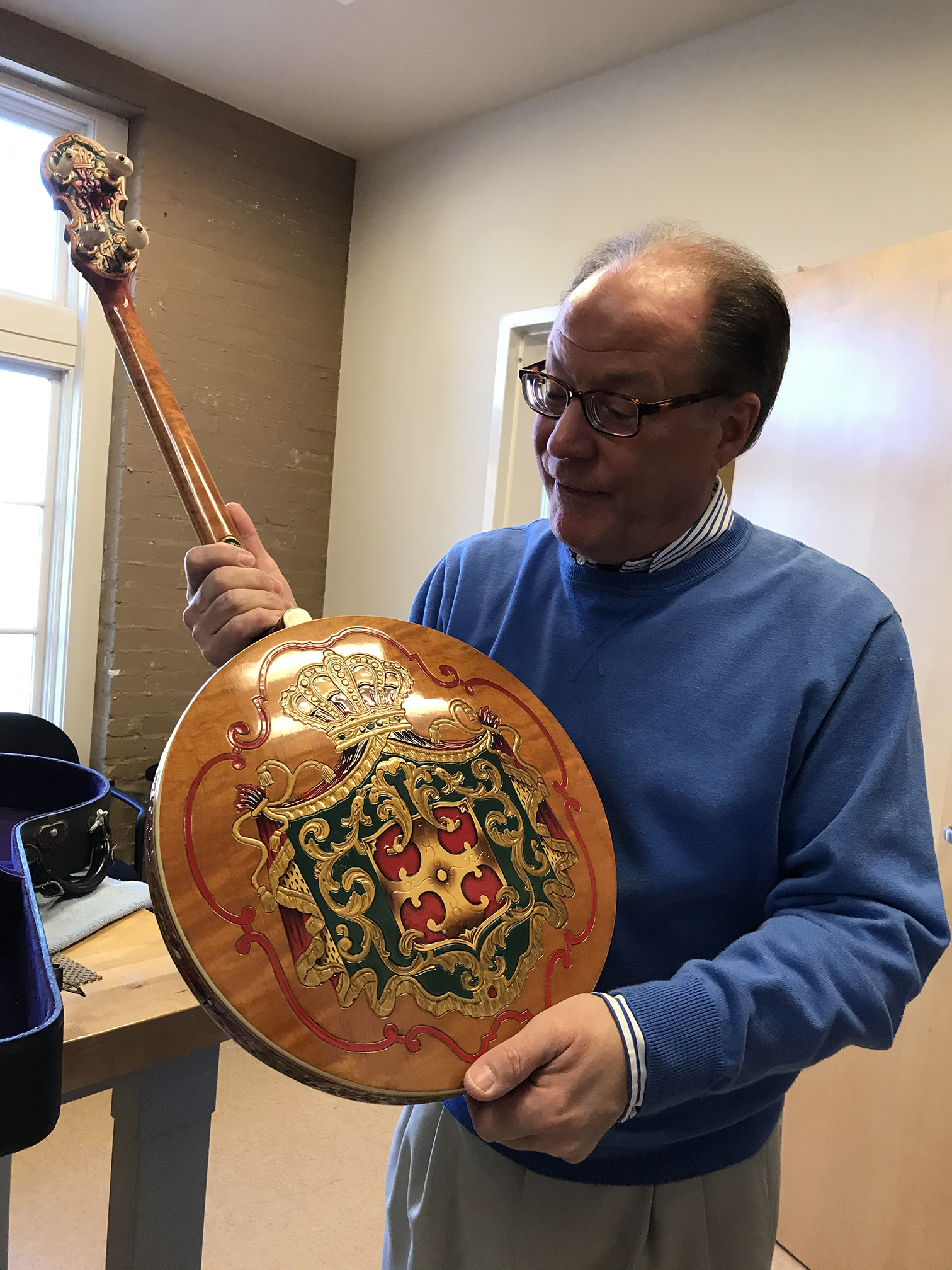
Johnny Baier holding a 1927 Gibson Florentine banjo, formerly owned by Steve Martin.

Comedian and actor Steve Martin was the subject of an exhibition in 2015, when he was inducted into the hall of fame for his work promoting the banjo. Johnny Baier said that for many people today, Steve Martin is the person they remember when they think of the banjo.

In January 2020, Martin donated a "one-of-a-kind," with gold plated armrest, an image of Mark Twain on the back, and an inlay-image of the Kennedy Center on the fingerboard he received as part of the Mark Twain Prize for American Humor in 2011 to the museum. The museum also acquired a Jazz-Age Gibson Florentine banjo from him. The museum is creating a new exhibit about Martin's life and his contributions to the banjo community using the two instruments as part of the exhibit.

== Gallery ==
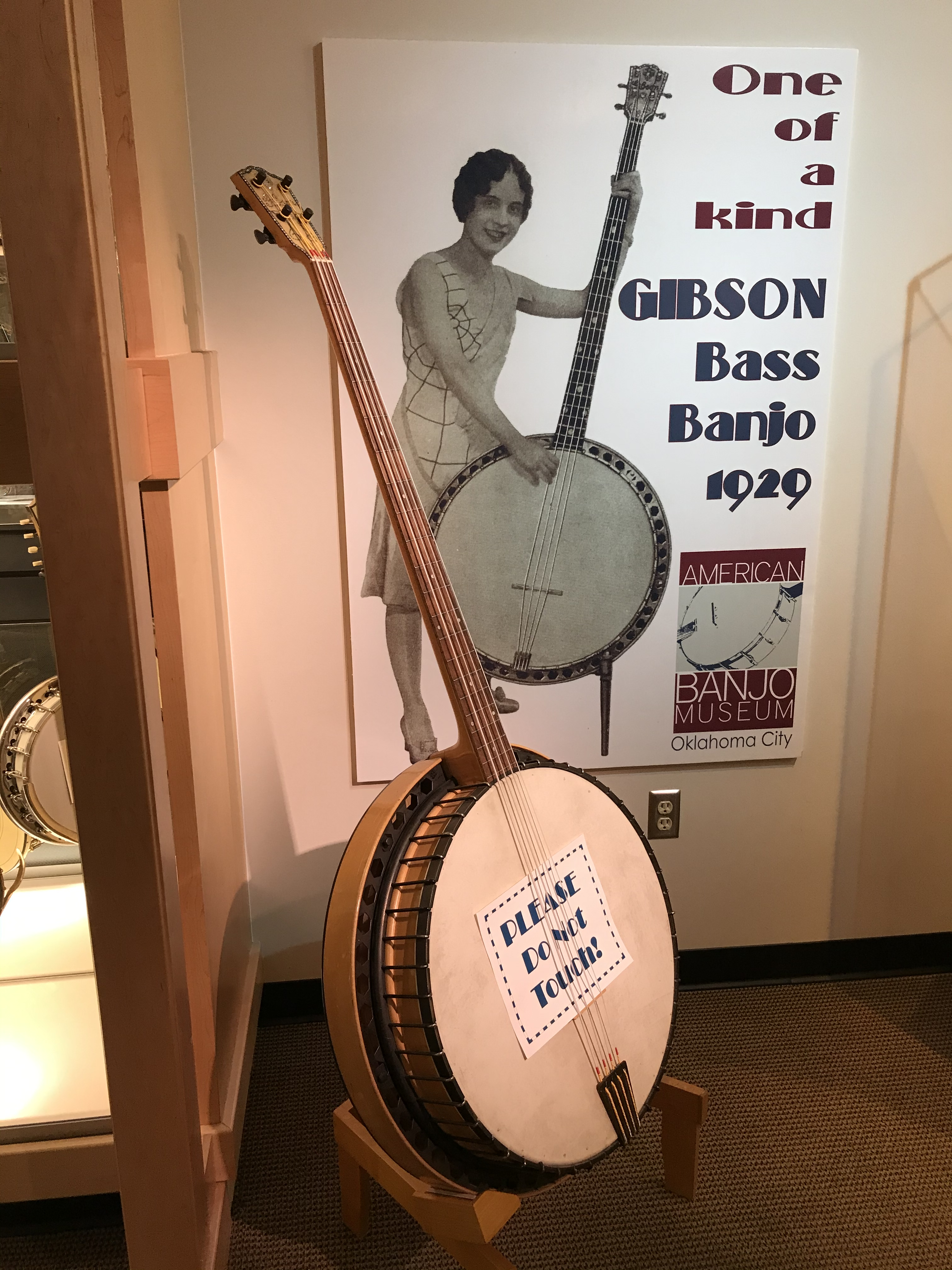
1929 Gibson Bass Banjo.

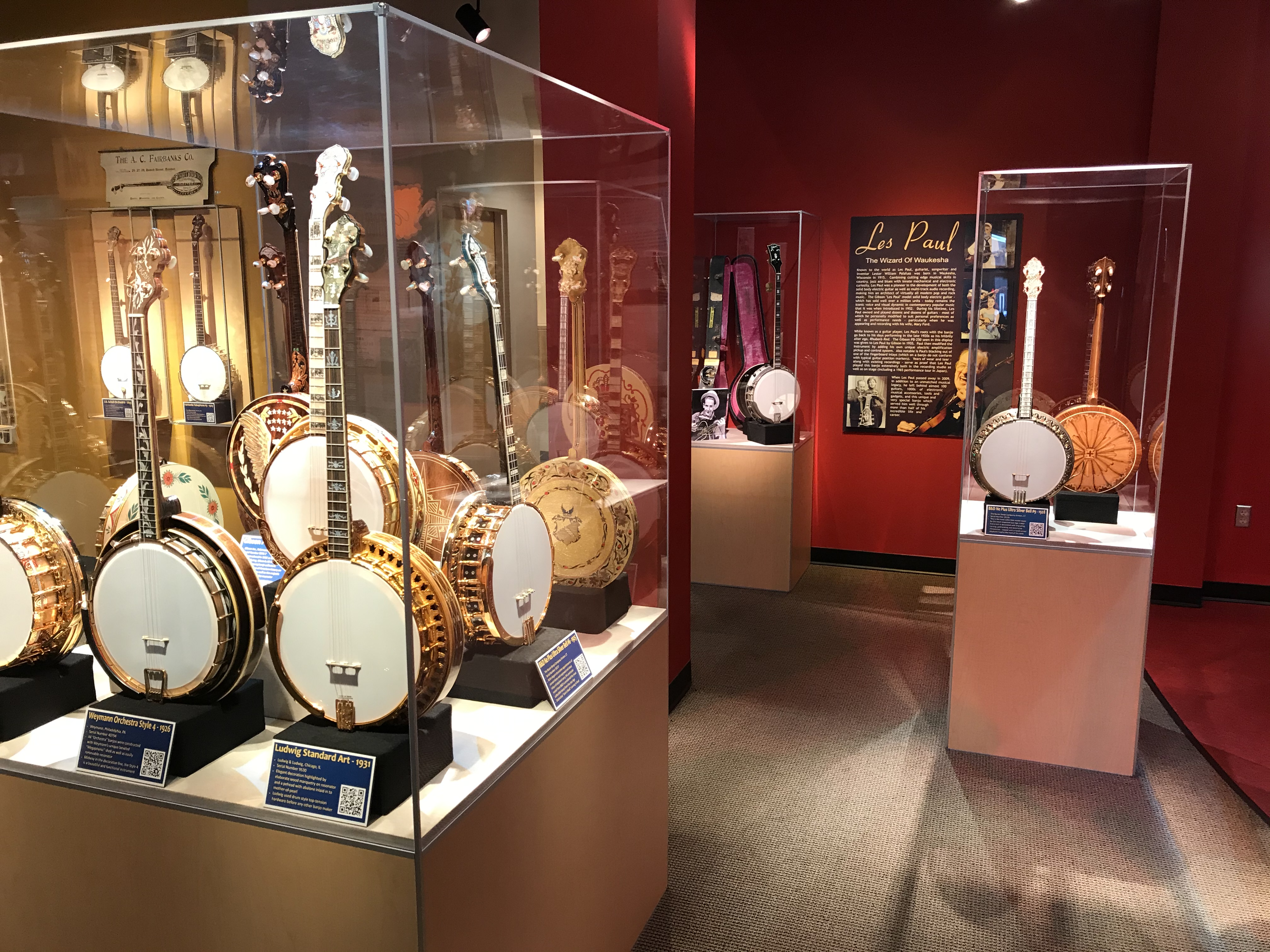
Jazz-Age banjos, American Banjo Museum. In the back is a 1955 Gibson PB-250 banjo, electrified by Les Paul. The instrument is displayed opened up so visitors can see the modifications.

Back of Ludwig Big Chief banjo (1930), with wood inlay.

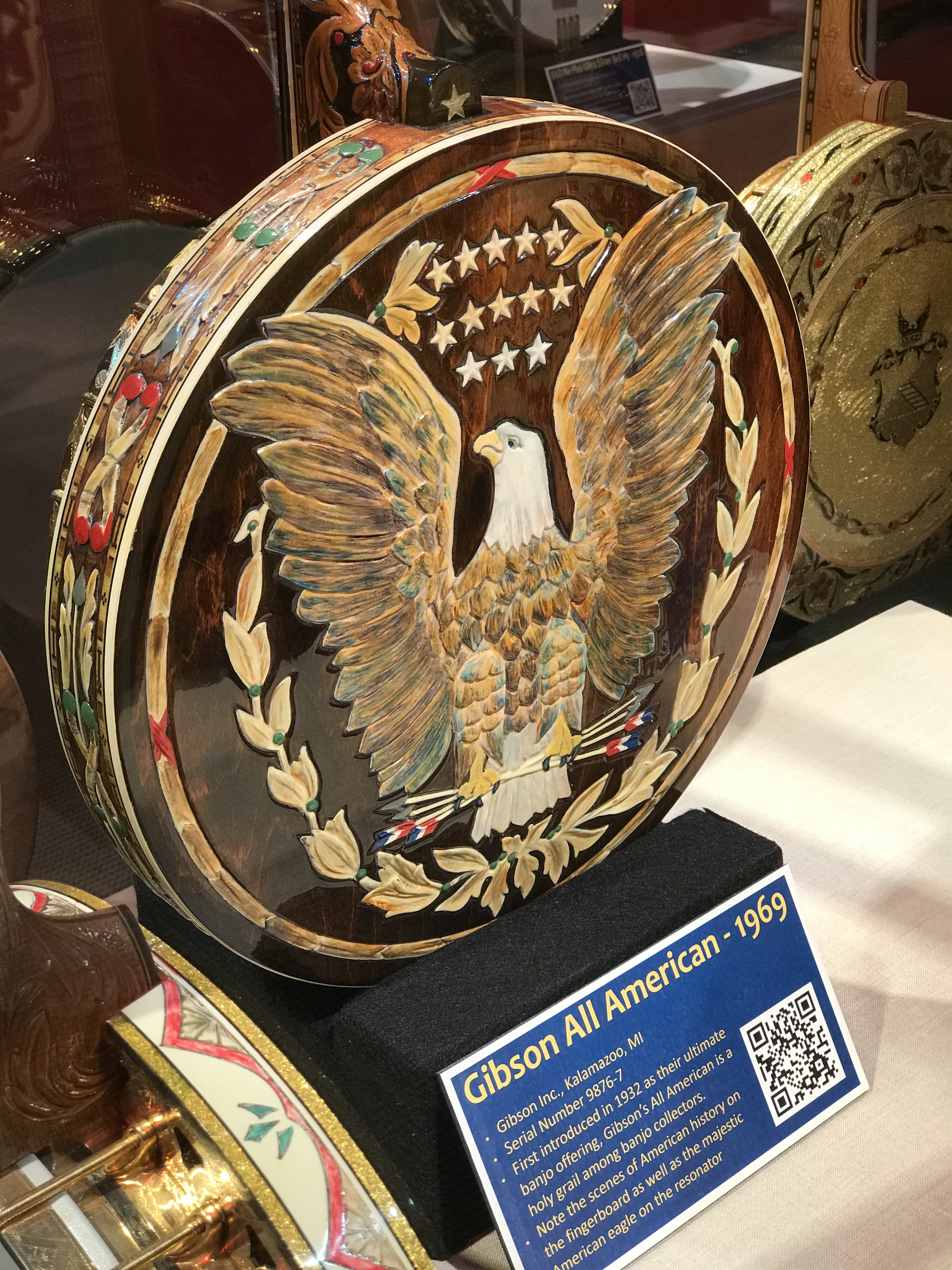
Decorated back of Gibson All American banjo (1969), a reissue of a Jazz-Age instrument from 1932.

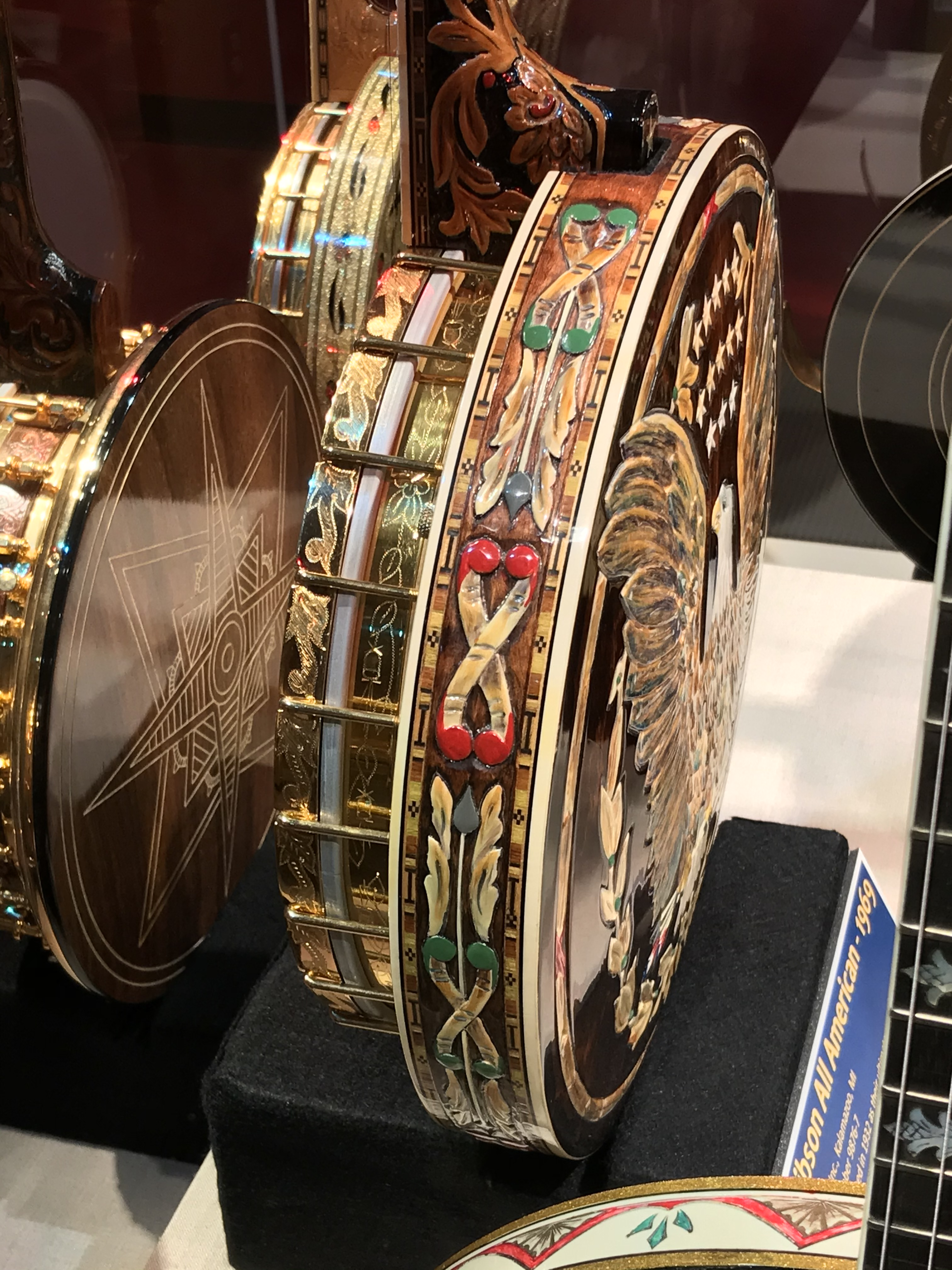
Decorated back and side of a Gibson All American banjo (1969). Highly decorated with carvings, engravings and gold

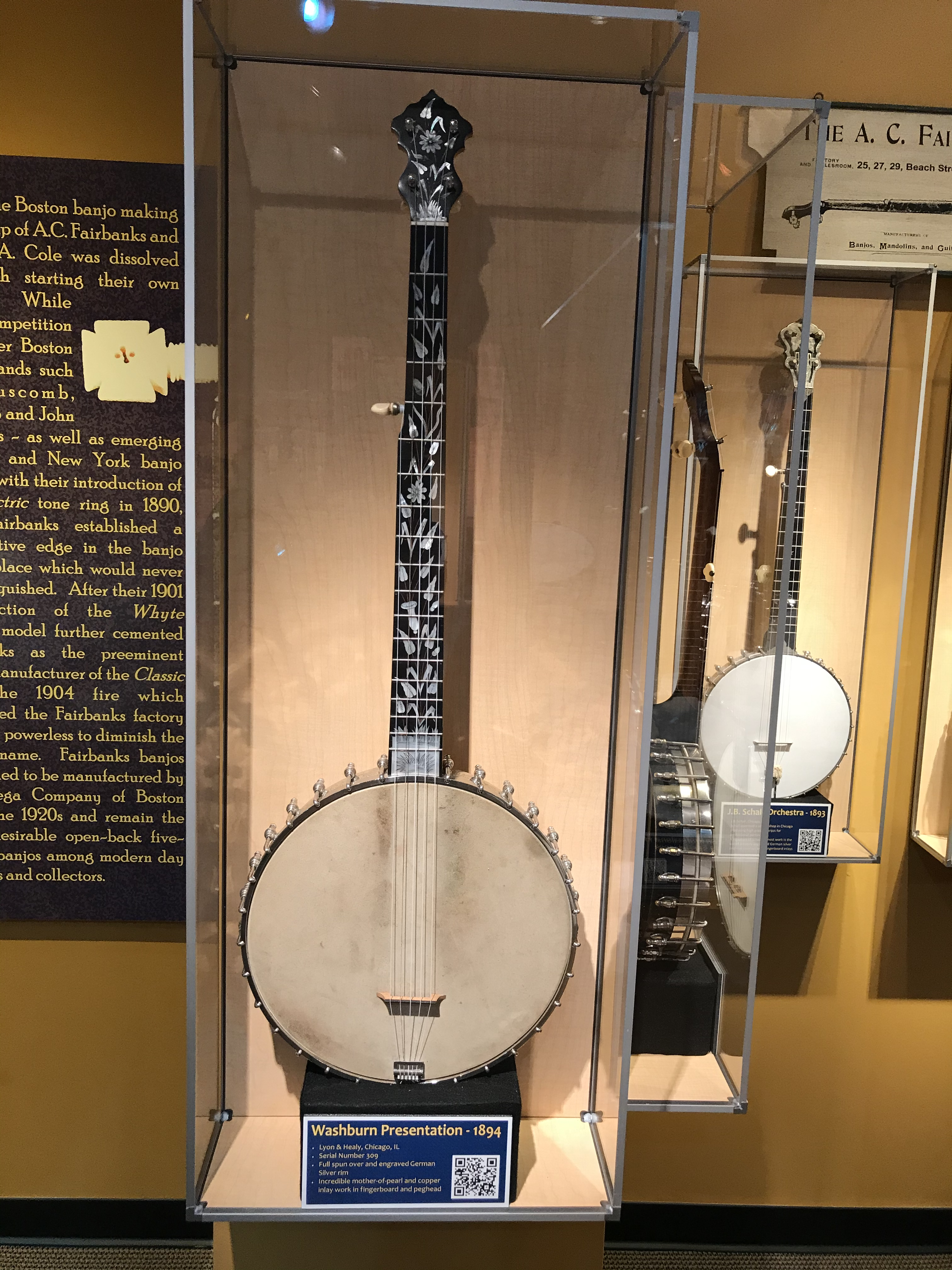
Washburn Presentation Banjo (Lyon & Healy) 1894. Rim made of spun silver, polished to bright sheen.
