= Banjoline =

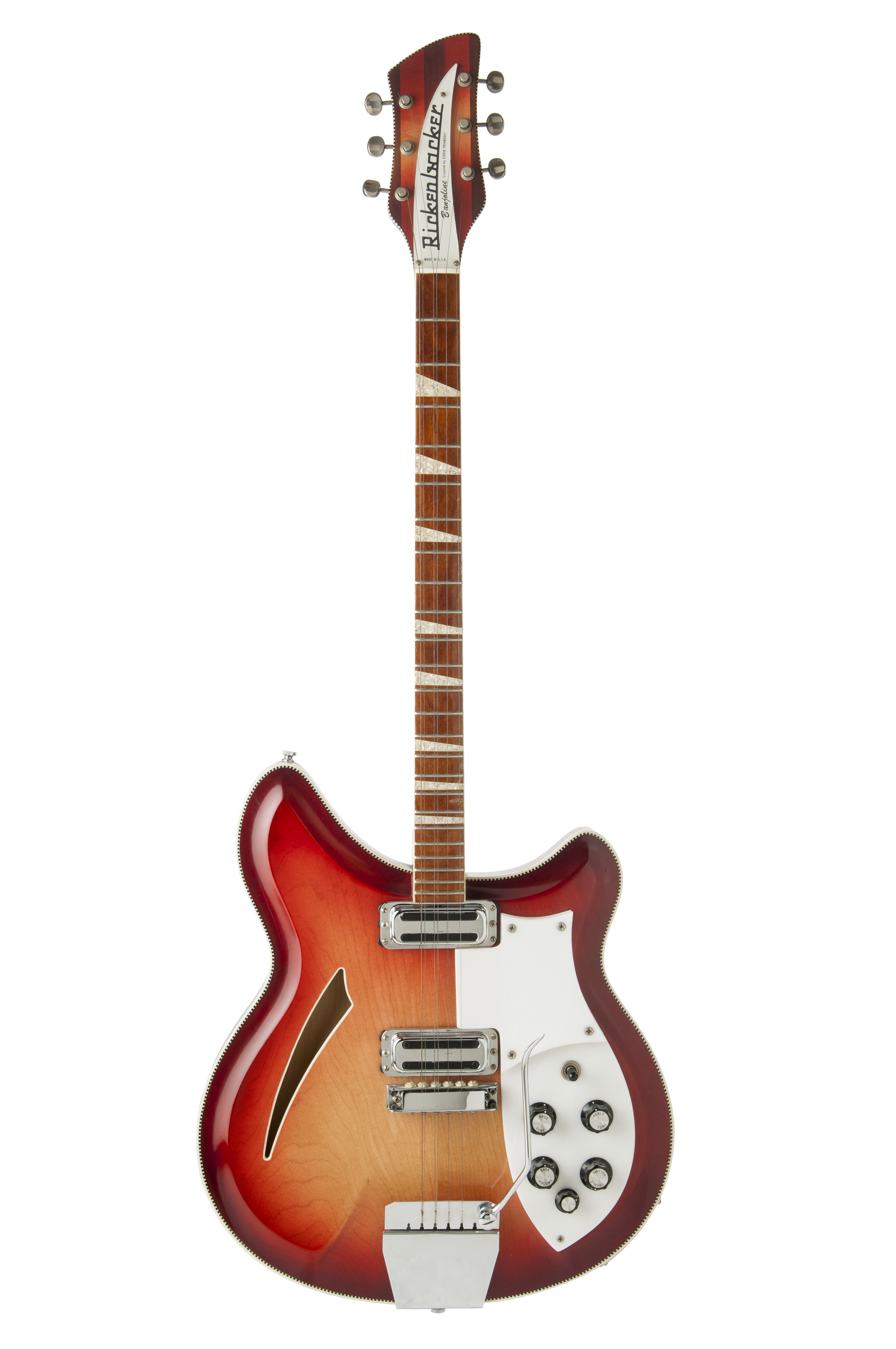
- Rickenbacker Banjoline Model 6006, 1969

String instrument
- Classification: String
- Inventor(s): Eddie Peabody
- Developed: 1930s

Related instruments
- tenor guitar; plectrum banjo

Builders
- Rickenbacker

The Banjoline is a four coursed instrument similar to a tenor guitar or plectrum banjo. The instrument was developed by Eddie Peabody in the 1930s, initially as an acoustic instrument. In the early 1950s, Peabody approached the Vega Company of Boston, Massachusetts which produced several electric versions of the instrument, but never put them into full production. In the mid 1950s, Peabody approached Rickenbacker, which built the 6005 and 6006 model electric banjoline under the supervision of Roger Rossmeisl. In 1962, Fender created a banjoline for Peabody shaped with their signature double cut-away body. In about 1966, another banjoline prototype was created by Roger Rossmeisl who had been employed at Fender since 1962. Bowed Banjoline is a combination on Banjoline with the violin and viola and is bowed similar to classical string instruments in the orchestra

== Design and tuning ==
Although its name suggests a combination of banjo and mandolin, it is technically considered to be a type of plectrum guitar, a variant of the electric guitar, resembling the banjo and mandolin only in terms of its four course stringing.

The Banjoline has six strings arranged in four courses and it has a scale length similar to that of a plectrum banjo. The two lowest courses consist of pairs of two strings and the two highest courses consist of two single strings. The Banjoline was intended to be tuned like a plectrum banjo (from low to high, CGBD). The strings were also described as octave base, unison third, single, second and first.

The pair of strings on the lowest course consists of one low C and another C an octave above it. The strings in the next highest course are tuned to the same G. The next two courses consist of single strings tuned to B and D. This makes for a tuning of CcGGBD.

== Performances ==
Eddie Peabody introduced the banjoline on The Banjo Wizardry of Eddie Peabody, with two songs, and recorded two LPs featuring only electric Banjoline for Dot Records entitled Eddie Plays Smoothies and Eddie Plays More Smoothies.
