= Cylinder-back mandolin =

Style of mandolin

The cylinder-back is a style of mandolin manufactured by the Vega Company of Boston, MA between 1913 and roughly 1925. The design patent (US patent number D44838) for the instrument was issued on November 4, 1913 to David L. Day, who was director and chief acoustical engineer for the stringed instrument division of the Vega Company. The patent was a design patent, suggesting the style was more decorative than functional.

The unique design feature of the cylinder-back instruments (originally referred to as mando-lutes by their manufacturer) is a cylindrical bulge running longitudinally along the back plate, from the tailpiece to the neck heel. This bulge increases the internal volume of the instrument. The result has been described as a compromise between the earlier Neapolitan-style bowl-back mandolins and the more modern styles with relatively flat backs that were manufactured primarily in the United States around the time of the cylinder-back's first appearance.

In addition to the mandolin, the same bulged-back concept was applied to the Vega mandola, mandcello, and mando-bass as well as to a series of hybrid 10-string instruments than spanned the pitch range between adjacently-sized 8-string models.
