= Prewar Gibson banjo =

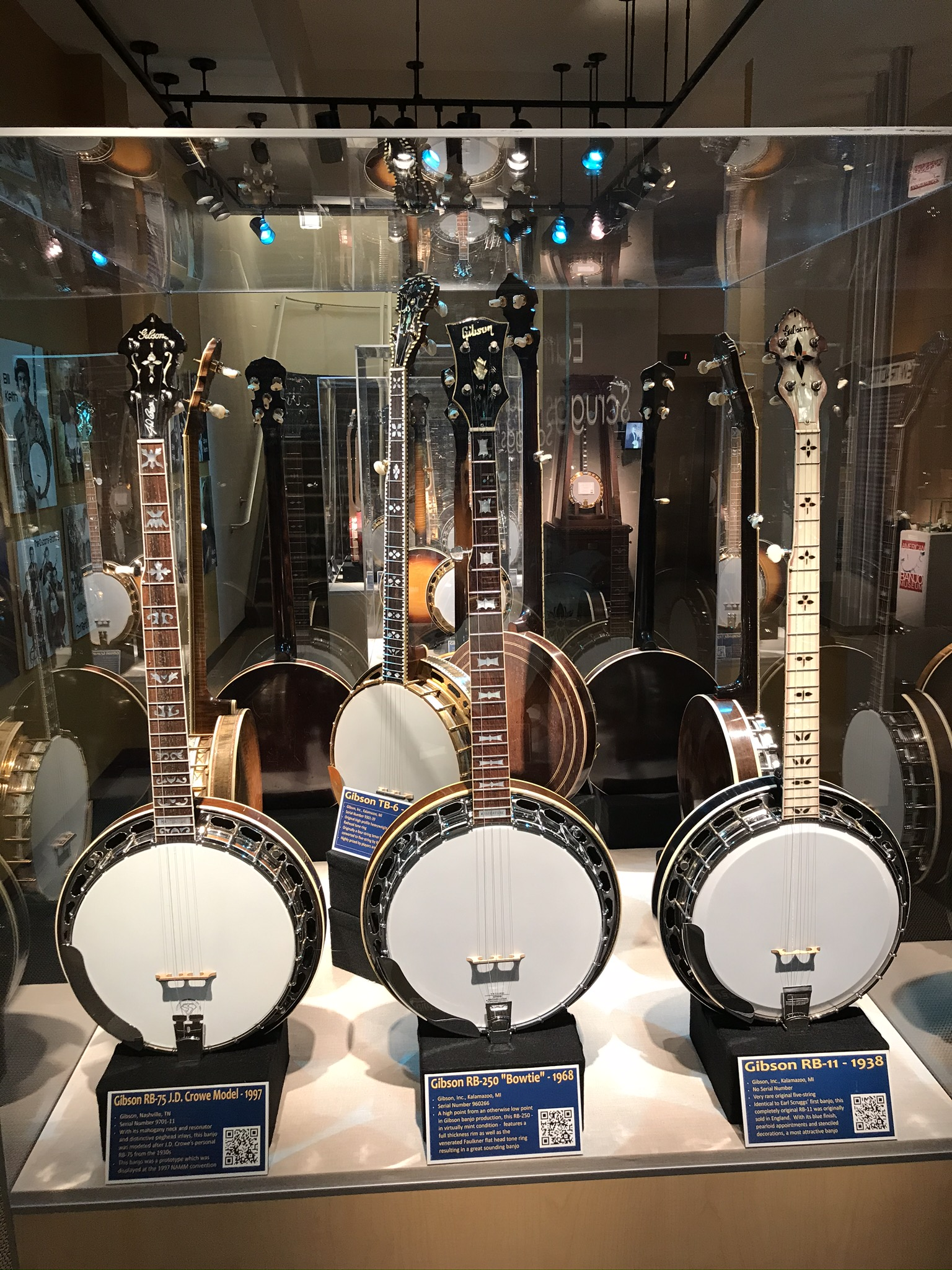
Modern reproductions of RB-75 and RB-250. Original Gibson RB-11 banjo from 1938.

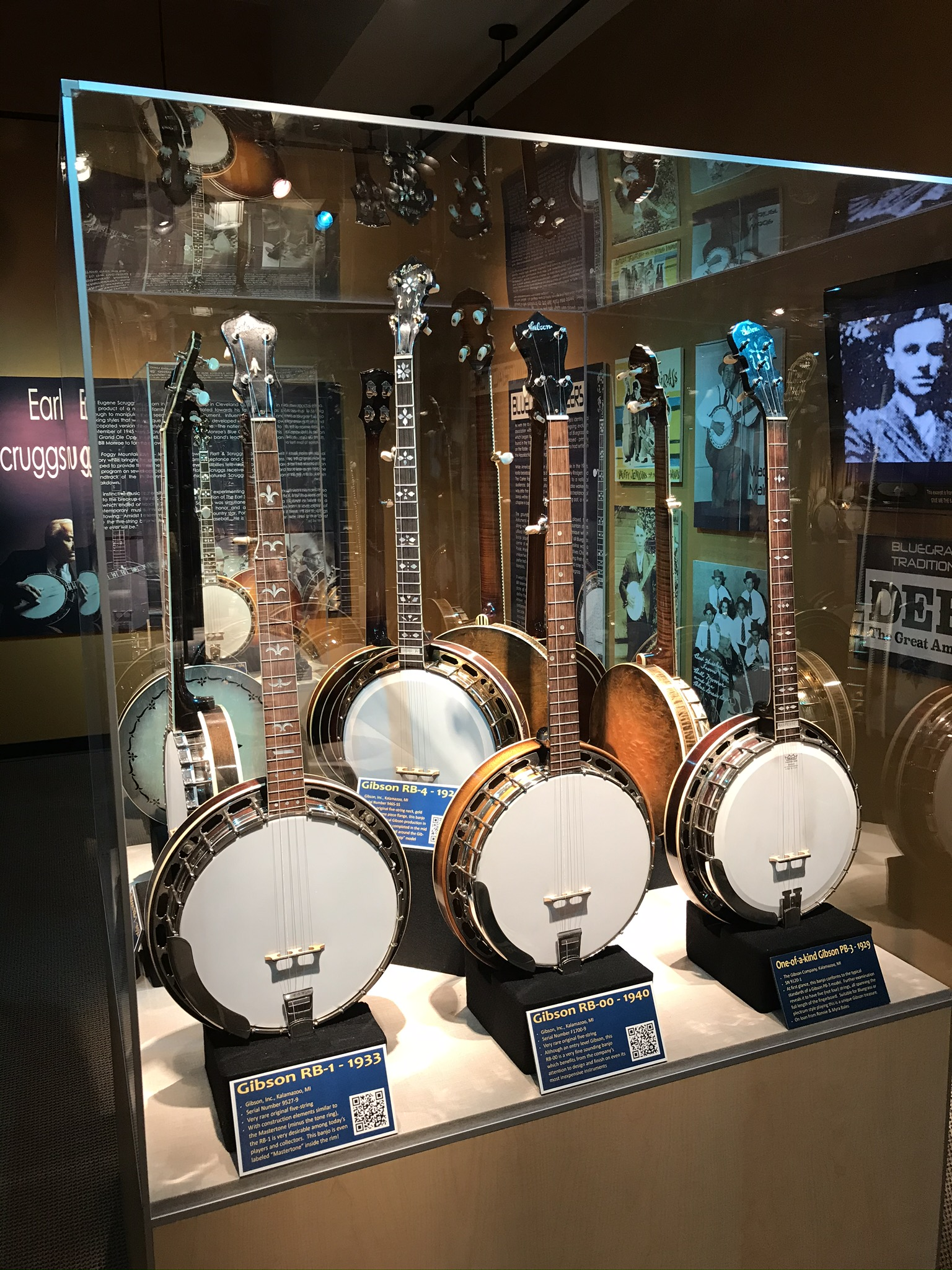
Gibson RB-1 (1933), RB-00 (1940), PB-3 (1929) banjos at the American Banjo Museum

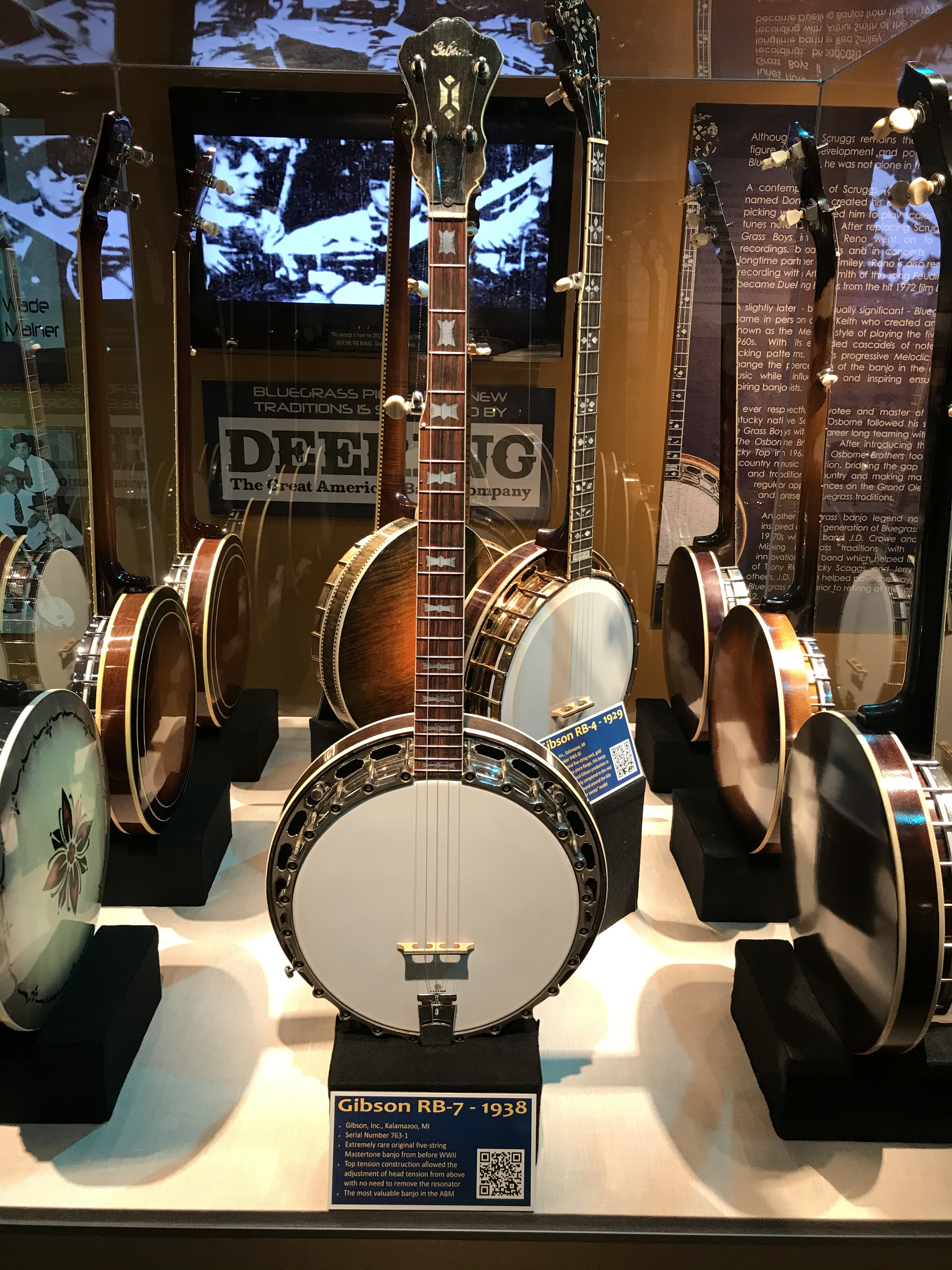
Gibson RB-7 (1938) banjo and Gibson RB-4 (1929) "floor sweep" banjo at the American Banjo Museum

Gibson manufactured banjos in the years before World War II. They are differentiated from later Gibson banjos by their scarcity. Banjo sales plummeted during the Great Depression, for lack of buyers, and metal parts became scarce into the 1940s as factories shifted to support the war. One notable characteristic of many pre-war Gibson banjos is the flat-head tone ring (also known as a flathead ring). This component is a heavy metal ring fitted inside the rim that plays a significant role in shaping the instrument’s overall tone and sustain parts became scarce, non-standard versions came out, made from a variety of leftover parts, called floor sweep models.

== Terminology ==
Although this term normally refers to World War II, when used to describe Gibson banjos, the term prewar operationally refers to banjos made prior to 1947. Production of metal banjo parts was suspended during World War II. However, small numbers of Gibson banjos continued to be constructed and shipped during the war years using stocks of metal parts remaining in factory bins.

Production of metal banjo parts resumed in late 1946; however, it is commonly believed that the metal composition of foundry products delivered to Gibson after World War II was inferior to that of parts produced prior to 1940. On April 12, 1947, the Gibson Instrument Company changed their corporate logo from script lettering to the use of block letters, and this change occurred sufficiently close to resumption of banjo output to allow easy identification of prewar and postwar Gibson instruments.
