= Deering Banjo Company =

American musical instrument manufacturer

- Company type: Private
- Industry: Musical instruments
- Founded: 1975
- Founder: Greg Deering
- Headquarters: Spring Valley, California, USA
- Area served: Global
- Key people: Greg Deering, Janet Deering
- Owner: Greg and Janet Deering
- Subsidiaries: Vega, Tenbrooks, Goodtime
- Website: DeeringBanjos.com

The Deering Banjo Company was started in 1975 by Greg and Janet Deering. They are located in Spring Valley, California. It is now run by their daughter Jamie Deering. Deering Banjos makes Deering, Vega, Tenbrooks, and Goodtime banjos. Many notable banjo players play Deering banjos. For example, Winston Marshal, founding member of Mumford & Sons, plays banjos made by Deering. He originally played an Eagle but has transitioned to various instruments including a signature model that bears his name. Deering Banjos, handmade in California, are the largest manufacturer of banjos in North America.
