= Eddie Peabody =

American musician and entertainer (1902–1970)

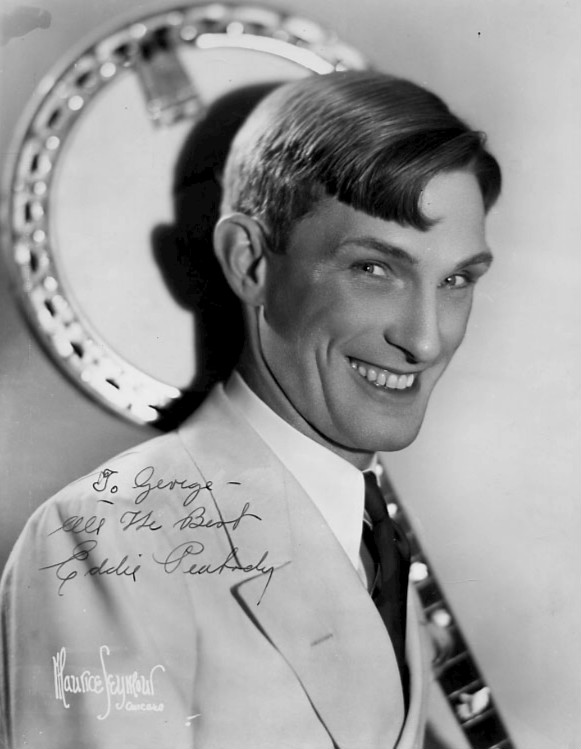
- Peabody in 1946

Background information
- Also known as: King of the Banjo
- Born: Edwin Ellsworth Peabody; February 19, 1902; Reading, Massachusetts, U.S.
- Died: November 7, 1970 (aged 68) Covington, Kentucky, U.S.
- Genres: Vaudeville
- Occupations: Musician, entertainer
- Instruments: Banjo, banjoline, mandolin, violin, guitar
- Years active: 1921–1970
- Website: eddiepeabody.com

Edwin Ellsworth Peabody (February 19, 1902 – November 7, 1970) was an American banjo player, instrument developer, and musical entertainer whose career spanned five decades. He was the most famous plectrum banjoist of his era.

== Early life and military service ==
Born in Reading, Massachusetts, Peabody taught himself to play the violin, mandolin, guitar and banjo while very young.

In March 1916, at age 14, Peabody enlisted in the U.S. Navy by lying about his age, and served in World War I on an S-14 submarine. During this period he received the nicknames "Happiness Boy" (for his ebullient personality, especially when performing) and "Little Eddie" (a comic reference to his short stature).

== Career ==
After Peabody's 1921 discharge from the Navy, he began a long career in show business, beginning with Vaudeville. His successful recordings for the Columbia Company made him a household name. His energetic playing style, which included fast triplets, glissandos and cross-picking simulating the sound of two banjoists, prompted a 1920s reviewer to nickname him "King Of The Banjo"—a sobriquet he retained the rest of his life.

In the 1930s, Peabody promoted the plectrum banjo by visiting many of England's BMG (Banjo, Mandolin and Guitar) clubs, which were popular in the years prior to World War II. In the early 1940s, he headlined at the National Barn Dance, broadcast on AM radio station WLS Chicago. When the U.S. entered WW II, he returned to the Navy as a morale officer with the rank of Lt. Commander, performed in shows for servicemen, and directed the music and band departments of the Great Lakes Training Station near Chicago, Illinois.

After the war, Peabody attempted to restart his concert career. By then, most Vaudeville halls had closed and musical tastes had changed. In 1948, the Art Mooney Orchestra resurrected the 1920s standard I'm Looking Over a Four Leaf Clover and created interest in both nostalgic music and the banjo. Capitalizing on this trend, Peabody recorded several albums for Dot Records and performed at the supper clubs which were popular at the time. His subsequent TV appearances made him a household name once again. He went on to produce records, appear in movies, and inspire generations of banjoists who continue to emulate his spirited style.

== Later accomplishments ==
In partnership with the Vega Banjo Company of Boston, Peabody developed a new type of plectrum banjo called the Vegavox, featuring a resonator that rose the full height of the banjo's body. (Traditional resonators are about half as high.) This increased the banjo's interior resonation space, giving it a distinctively mellow tone. It also featured a "top-tension" design that allowed the head's tension to be adjusted without removing the resonator. The Vegavox was produced primarily in four-stringed plectrum (22-fret) and tenor (19-fret) versions; however, some five-string models were made as special orders.

Peabody also developed a special electric banjo—first with Vega, and later with the Fender Company and Rickenbacker—called the Banjoline. It was tuned as a plectrum banjo but with the 3rd and 4th strings doubled in octaves, as on a 12-string guitar. Although seldom performed on today, it is a highly prized collector's item.

Peabody performed for national leaders around the world. In 1958, Dwight D. Eisenhower awarded him a distinguished People To People Award for meritorious service in both the military and show business.

According to one broadcast veteran, a radio announcer once mis-introduced Peabody by saying, "Ladies and gentlemen, Mr. Eddie Playbody will now pee for you".

== Personal life ==
In the 1920s Peabody married his business manager, Maude Kelly. After several visits to the Mission Inn in Riverside, California, the Peabodys lived in Riverside from 1928 to 1939, when they divorced. In 1940 he married Ragna Kaupanger, a Norwegian-American nurse and United Airlines flight attendant. They had two children, Eddie Jr. and George Robert Peabody.

Peabody continued to perform until his death in 1970, at age 68, due to a brain hemorrhage suffered while onstage at the Lookout House Supper Club in Covington, Kentucky. His wife Ragna died in 2002.

== See also ==
- American Banjo Museum Hall of Fame members
