= Vega Company =

Former musical instrument manufacturer in Boston, Massachusetts

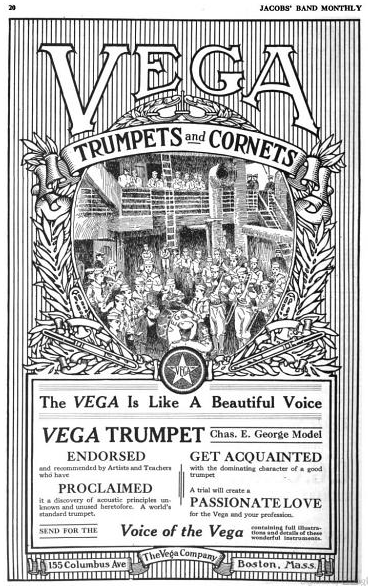
Advertisement for Vega Co., Columbus Avenue, Boston, 1919

The Vega Company was a musical instrument manufacturer that started operations in Boston, Massachusetts, in 1881. The company began under Swedish-born Julius Nelson, his brother Carl, and a group of associates that included John Pahn and John Swenson. The founders had previously worked for a guitar shop run by Pehr Anderberg that made instruments for John C. Haynes, another Boston musical instrument company. Nelson had served as foreman of guitar and mandolin manufacturing at Anderberg's shop. Subsequently, Julius and Carl Nelson bought out the other founding associates and established the Vega company.

In 1904, Vega acquired the instrument manufacturing firm (primarily building banjos) previously operated by A. C. Fairbanks. Vega also acquired the plectrum instrument division of Boston's Thompson & Odell Company, which made bowl-back mandolins, guitars, and several types of banjos. The emphasis remained true to Vega's origins, however, with about 60% of business centered on stringed instruments and 40% on brass.

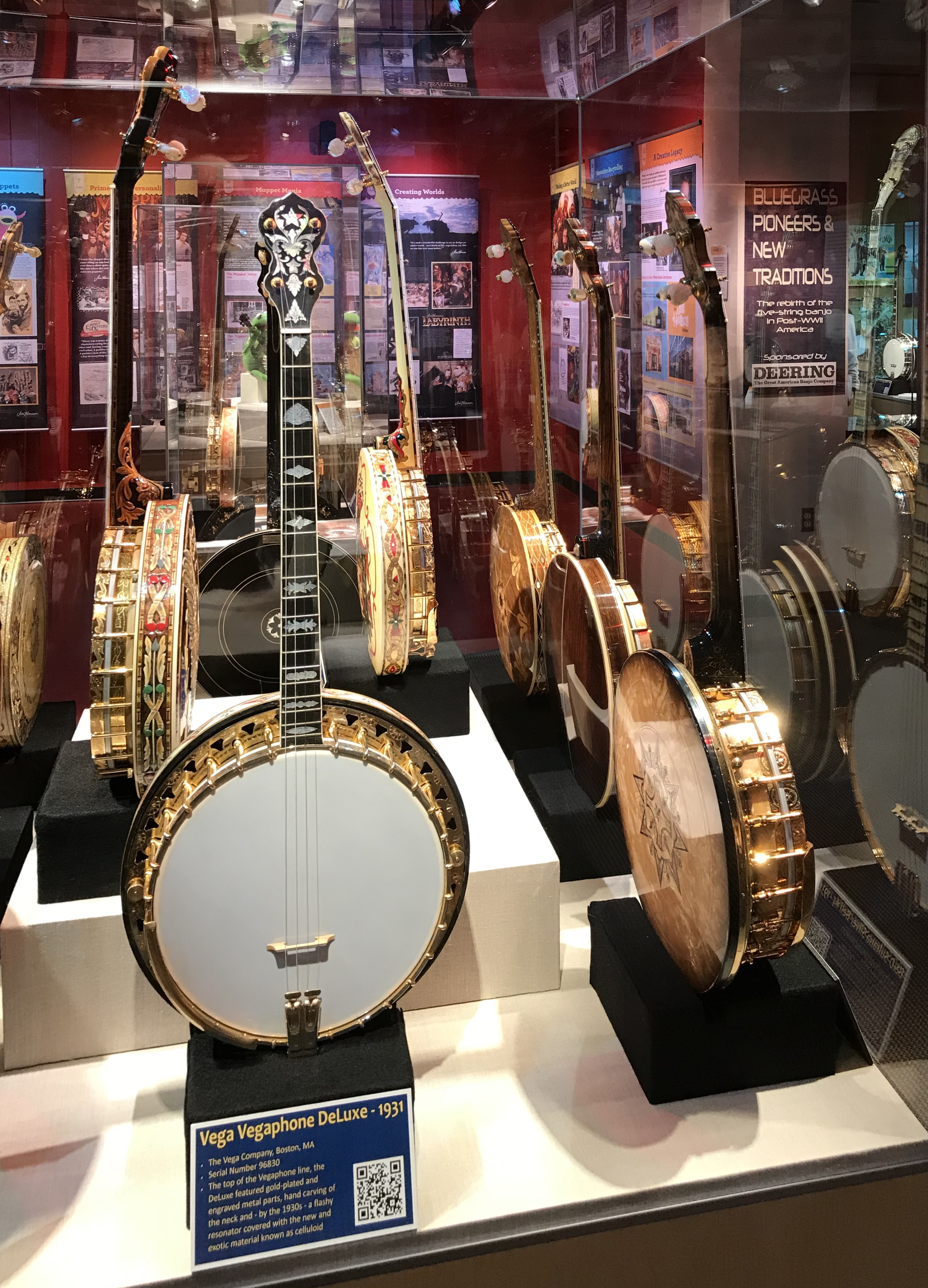
A Vega ‘’Vegaphone Deluxe’’ banjo (1931) is exhibited in a case of Jazz Age banjos at the American Banjo Museum.

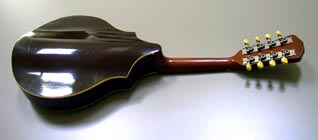
The bulge on the instrument's back side is visible in this photo of a Vega cylinder-back mandolin.

The Vega Company is best known today for its banjos, such as the Vegavox model they co-developed with famous plectrum player Eddie Peabody. Vega continued to build and sell A.C. Fairbanks banjos after it acquired that company. Vega initially labeled these instruments A. C. Fairbanks, then switched to Fairbanks banjo by the Vega Co., then eventually to just Vega. David L. Day, who had been the chief acoustical designer at Fairbanks, became general manager of the Vega stringed instrument division and continued to develop innovative and successful banjo designs. For example, the Vega Tu-ba-Phone, which first appeared in 1909, featured a perforated metal tone ring—a ring-shaped, square-sectioned metal tube that lay between the instrument's wooden rim and calfskin head. The Tu-ba-Phone tone ring provided a volume and tone still admired by many banjo players.

Another noteworthy Vega instrument line was the cylinder-back mandolin family. This included mandolins, mandolas, mandocellos, and a small number of mandobasses and acoustic guitars.

Vega also produced a line of brass instruments. In 1909, Vega purchased the Standard Band Instrument Company of Boston incorporating their line of horns. This company had previously operated under names including Quinby Brothers, Hall & Quinby, Hall Quinby Wright Company, and others. It had been founded in 1861 by David Hall, a band leader, bugle player and instrument maker. The name Wright came from E.G. Wright whose E.G Wright and Company merged with other investors to create the Boston Musical Instrument Manufactury in 1869. Wright was briefly a partner in the company between 1870 and his death. Vega built brass instruments under the Vega and Standard names well into the 20th century.

Vega also produced high quality guitars. In the 1930s, the company built archtop guitars with backs and tops carved in the manner of violins. These became especially popular with jazz musicians. Eventually they produced electrified versions of these guitars. They also produced a guitar with a longitudinal bulge along its back, like the company's cylinder-back mandolins, and a similar longitudinal bulge along its top. The top bulge is reminiscent of the design used on Howe-Orme instruments—from another Boston firm, the Elias Howe Company. Vega also produced two successful lines of Hawaiian, or lap steel, guitars: The Vega Commander, and its top-of-the-line Triumphal which featured a lap as well as a console version.

As the 1940s and 1950s unfolded, the quality of Vega instruments declined and it became clear that the company's most innovative and productive years had passed. In the 1970s, the C. F. Martin Company purchased Vega in the hope of capitalizing on the popularity of Vega's banjos among folk musicians. Under the Vega name, Martin produced guitars with the Vega logo on their headstocks in a Netherlands guitar factory (and probably others), usually with a label referencing "C.F. Martin Organization." These instruments were produced during most of the 1970s. The "netherlands factory" was the Egmond factory which Martin had an agreement with at the time.

Perhaps the most visible Vega instrument in the 1950s and 60s was the long neck 5-string banjo designed and used by folk singer Pete Seeger, and later by several folk groups like The Kingston Trio and The Limeliters.

Martin also used the Vega name for a line of strings. The Vega name was subsequently licensed to a number of American and international companies. In 1989, the Deering Banjo Company purchased the Vega name. They currently produce Vega banjos reminiscent of the instruments Vega made during the 1960s folk revival.

Vega trumpets and cornets were on par with the highest quality brass horns of their time. Popular with jazz artists as well as later big bands and solo artists such as Miles Davis, who performed on the Vega Power Model before he endorsed the Martin Committee, they enjoyed a comfortable niche in the professional market. However, producing handcrafted professional horns without keeping an eye to increasing demand for student instruments, and with aging artisans retiring, the company dropped horn production to concentrate on stringed instruments.
