= List of jazz banjoists =

The following musicians are professional Jazz banjoists:

== B ==
- Dave Barbour
- Danny Barnes
- Lee Blair
- Jack Bland

== C ==
- John Carlini
- Stian Carstensen
- James Chirillo
- Eddie Condon

== D ==
- Louis Nelson Delisle
- Charlie Dixon
- Dudu do banjo

== E ==
- Lars Edegran

== F ==
- Béla Fleck
- Albert "Papa" French

== G ==
- Eddie Gibbs
- Gene Gifford
- Harper Goff
- Marty Grosz
- George Guesnon
- Fred Guy

== H ==
- Clancy Hayes

== J ==
- Lonnie Johnson
- Sherwood Johnson

== K ==
- Narvin Kimball

== M ==
- Lawrence Marrero
- Jimmy Mazzy
- James McKinney

== L ==
- Nappy Lamare
- "Father" Al Lewis

== P ==
- Mike Pingitore
- Bucky Pizzarelli
- Scotty Plummer

== Q ==
- Snoozer Quinn

== S ==
- Cynthia Sayer
- Emanuel Sayles
- Bud Scott
- Elmer Snowden
- Johnny St. Cyr
- Jayme Stone

== T ==
- Charlie Tagawa

== V ==
- Jack Vance

== W ==
- Dave Wilborn
- Morris White

== See also ==
- List of jazz musicians
