= Dudu =

Dudu may refer to:

== Places ==
=== Iran ===
- Dudu, Hormozgan, a village in South Khorasan Province
- Dudu, South Khorasan, a village in South Khorasan Province

=== India ===
- Dudu, Jammu and Kashmir, a village in Jammu and Kashmir
- Dudu, Rajasthan , a district in the state of Rajasthan
- Dudu (Rajasthan Assembly constituency)

=== Romania ===
- Dudu, a village in Chiajna Commune, Ilfov County
- Dudu a village in Plopii-Slăvitești Commune, Teleorman County

=== Space ===
- 564 Dudu, a minor planet

== People ==
=== Given name, nickname or mononym ===
==== Footballers ====
- Dudu (footballer, born 1939), Brazilian midfielder and coach Olegário Tolóí de Oliveira
- Dudu (footballer, born 1980), Brazilian forward Eduardo Francisco da Silva Neto
- Dudu (footballer, born 1982), Brazilian midfielder Carlos Eduardo Passos Farias
- Dudu (footballer, born 17 April 1990), Brazilian defender Luis Eduardo Chebel Klein Nunes
- Dudu (footballer, born 21 April 1990), Brazilian forward Luiz Eduardo dos Santos Gonzaga
- Dudu (footballer, born 1992), Brazilian winger and attacking midfielder Eduardo Pereira Rodrigues
- Dudu (footballer, born 1993), Brazilian defender Carlos Eduardo Bendini Giusti
- Dudu (footballer, born 1996), Brazilian forward Luiz Eduardo da Silva dos Santos
- Dudu (footballer, born 1997), Brazilian right back Luís Eduardo Marques dos Santos
- Dudu (footballer, born 1998), Brazilian footballer Eduardo Feitoza Sampaio
- Dudu (German footballer) (born 1999), German goalkeeper Eduardo dos Santos Haesler
- Dudu (footballer, born June 1999), Brazilian midfielder Eduardo Marcelo Rodrigues Nunes
- Dudu (footballer, born August 1999), Brazilian midfielder Luiz Eduardo Teodora da Silva
- Dudu (footballer, born 2001), Brazilian midfielder Eduardo dos Santos
- Dudu (footballer, born 2002), Brazilian left back Eduardo Kempf Schwade
- Dudu (footballer, born 2005), Brazilian midfielder Eduardo Vinícius Rodrigues dos Santos
- Dudu (footballer, born 2006), Brazilian midfielder Eduardo Kogitzki Anastacio
- Dudu Aouate (born 1977), Israeli goalkeeper
- Dudu Biton (born 1988), Israeli striker
- Dudu Cearense (born 1983), Brazilian central midfielder
- Dudu Dahan (born 1971), Israeli retired defender and manager
- Dudu Doukara (born 1991), French-Senegalese footballer
- Dudu Figueiredo (born 1991), Brazilian attacking midfielder
- Dudu Georgescu (born 1950), Romanian footballer
- Dudu Hatamoto (born 2003), Brazilian forward
- Dudu Mineiro (born 1985), Brazilian forward
- Dudu Omagbemi (born 1985), Nigerian football striker
- Dudu Pacheco (born 1997), Brazilian midfielder
- Dudu Paraíba (born 1985), Brazilian football left wingback
- Eduardo da Silva (born 1983), Croatian footballer
- Dudu Twito (born 1994), Israeli football left back

==== Musicians ====
- Dudu Aharon (born 1984), Israeli singer
- Dudu do Banjo (born 1935), Brazilian guitar player and "king of banjo"
- Dudu Barak (born 1948), Israeli poet, songwriter, and radio presenter
- Dudu Elharar (born 1945), Israeli singer, music producer, actor and presenter
- Dudu Faruk (born 1996), Israeli rapper, singer and actor
- Dudu Fisher (born 1951), Israeli singer and stage performer
- Dudu Nobre (born 1974), Brazilian composer and singer
- Dudu Pukwana (1938–1990), South African saxophonist, composer and pianist
- Dudu Tassa (born 1977), Israeli musician
- Dudu Tucci (born 1955), Brazilian percussionist, singer and composer

==== Other people ====
- Dudu of Akkad (fl. c. 21st century BC), king of Akkad
- Dudu Busani-Dube (born 1981), South African author and journalist
- Eduardo Dantas (born 1989), Brazilian bantamweight mixed martial arts fighter
- Dudu Duswara (c. 1951–2020), Indonesian judge
- Dudu Gerstein (born 1944), Israeli painter and sculptor
- Dudu Geva (1950–2005), Israeli artist, writer, cartoonist, illustrator, and comic book creator
- Dudu Karakaya (born 1985), Turkish middle-distance runner
- Dudu Mentemu (1370–1433), Manchurian chieftain
- Dudu Miyan (1819–1862), Indian militant leader
- Dudu Miyan II (1913–1997), Bangladeshi religious leader
- Dudu Mntowaziwayo Ndlovu (1957–1992), Zulu dancer
- Dudu Myeni (born 1963), South African businesswoman
- Dudu Topaz (1946–2009), Israeli comedian, actor, author and radio and television host
- Dudu Zondo (born 1994), South African cricketer

=== Surname ===
- Sabit Dudu (1930–2022), Sudanese goalkeeper
- Khandaker Rashiduzzaman Dudu (died 2014), Bangladeshi politician
- Princess Dudu (born 1978), Nigerian taekwondo practitioner
- Shamsul Alam Dudu (born 1957), Bangladeshi politician
- Shamsuzzaman Dudu, Bangladeshi politician

== Other uses ==
- Dudu (album), by Turkish pop singer Tarkan
- Dudu, a West German children's comedy film series also known as Superbug

== See also ==
- Doudou (disambiguation)
- Dudus, nickname of Christopher Coke (born 1969), Jamaican drug lord and gang leader
