= List of banjo players =

This article comprises two separate lists. The first consists of primary banjo players and the second of celebrities that also play the banjo.

== Primary banjo players ==
A listing of notable musicians who play the banjo as a major part of their output include:

=== A ===
- Derroll Adams
- Eddie Adcock
- David "Stringbean" Akeman
- Howard Alden
- Peter R. Arnott
- Clarence Ashley
- Scott Avett

=== B ===
- Etta Baker
- Danny Barker
- Danny Barnes
- Terry Baucom
- Riley Baugus
- Andru Bemis
- Carroll Best
- Louis 'Lou' Black
- Ron Block
- Dock Boggs
- Maurice Bolyer
- Isaac Brock
- Ruby Brooks
- Alison Brown
- Peter Buck
- Lindsey Buckingham
- John Butler
- Picayune Butler

=== C ===
- Howard Caine
- Elizabeth (Bessie) Campbell
- Gus Cannon
- Bob Carlin
- Gaither Carlton
- June Carter
- Eugene Chadbourne
- Jack Chernos
- James Chirillo
- Bobby Clancy
- Roy Clark
- Fred Cockerham
- Eddie Condon
- J. D. Crowe

=== D ===
- Erik Darling
- Jeff DaRosa
- Reverend Gary Davis
- Michael DeTemple
- Douglas Dillard
- Dwight Diller
- Lonnie Donegan
- John Dowling
- Jimmy Driftwood

=== E ===
- David Eugene Edwards
- Ben Eldridge
- Curtis Eller
- Bill Emerson
- Dan Emmett
- Clifford Essex

=== F ===
- Billy Faier
- Raymond Fairchild
- Anthony Field
- Jem Finer
- Bradley Fish
- Béla Fleck
- George Formby
- Tony Furtado
- Finbar Furey

=== G ===
- Rhiannon Giddens
- Harper Goff
- Shakey Graves
- Bee Ho Gray
- Lamar Grier
- Dave Guard

=== H ===
- Tom Hanway
- JP Harris
- John Hartford
- Alex Hassilev
- Warren Hellman
- John Hickman
- Brent Hinds
- Roscoe Holcomb
- David Holt
- Matt Hoopes

=== I ===
- Gregory Alan Isakov
- Burl Ives

=== J ===
- Carl Jackson
- Papa Charlie Jackson
- Tommy Jarrell
- Cosmo Jarvis
- Snuffy Jenkins
- Courtney Johnson
- Mark Johnson
- Dave Johnston
- Grandpa Jones

=== K ===
- Buell Kazee
- Bill Keith
- Luke Kelly
- Narvin Kimball
- Elle King
- Julian Koster
- Jens Kruger

=== L ===
- Nappy Lamare
- Frank Lawes
- Jack Lawrence
- Bernie Leadon
- Lily May Ledford
- John H. Lee
- Neil LeVang
- Dan Levenson
- "Father" Al Lewis
- Bascom Lamar Lunsford
- Rudy Lyle

=== M ===
- Uncle Dave Macon
- Wade Mainer
- Tommy Makem
- Lawrence Marrero
- Winston Marshall
- Steve Martin
- Jimmy Mazzy
- Del McCoury
- Rob McCoury
- John McEuen
- Barney McKenna
- Larry McNeely
- Joe Medford
- Jim Mills
- Jonny Mizzone
- Mick Moloney
- Bruce Molsky
- Joe Morley
- Alan Munde
- Jay Munly
- Kacey Musgraves

=== O ===
- Fergus O'Byrne
- Gerry O'Connor
- Molly O'Day
- Sonny Osborne
- Vess Ossman

=== P ===
- Tom Paley
- Clive Palmer
- Jad Paul
- Jerron "Blind Boy" Paxton
- Eddie Peabody
- Herb Pedersen
- Francisco Pereira
- Noam Pikelny
- Mike Pingitore
- Joe Pisapia
- Scotty Plummer
- Charlie Poole
- Dirk Powell
- Teddy Powell

=== Q ===
- Howard 'Howdy' Quicksell

=== R ===
- Larry Ramos
- Ola Belle Reed
- Don Reno
- Don Wayne Reno
- Harry Reser
- Larry Richardson
- Dick Roberts
- Dink Roberts
- Butch Robins
- Ikey Robinson
- Emily Robison
- Art Rosenbaum
- Ryan Ross

=== S ===
- Johnny St. Cyr
- Cynthia Sayer
- Emanuel Sayles
- Enda Scahill
- Mark Schatz
- Robert Schmidt
- Jon Schneck
- Earl Scruggs
- Mike Seeger
- Peggy Seeger
- Pete Seeger
- George Segal
- Lee Sexton
- Bob Shane
- Sammy Shelor
- Allen Shelton
- B. F. Shelton
- Rick Shubb
- Matokie Slaughter
- Langhorne Slim
- Roy Smeck
- Arthur Smith
- Chloe Smith
- Hobart Smith
- Jim Smoak
- Leah Song
- Roger Sprung
- Ralph Stanley
- Sufjan Stevens
- Chris Stephens
- John Stewart
- Jayme Stone
- Roni Stoneman
- Joel Walker Sweeney

=== T ===
- Charlie Tagawa
- Otis Taylor
- Todd Taylor
- Bobby Thompson
- Pete Townshend
- Buck Trent
- Tony Trischka
- Leroy Troy
- James Tyler

=== V ===
- Fred Van Eps
- Scott Vestal

=== W ===
- Loudon Wainwright III
- Uncle Homer Walker
- Dock Walsh
- Wade Ward
- Abigail Washburn
- Patsy Watchorn
- Doc Watson
- Tim Weed
- Eric Weissberg
- Gillian Welch
- Pete Wernick
- Hedy West
- Thomas Joseph White
- Billy Whitlock
- JD Wilkes

=== Y ===
- Bob Yellin

== Celebrity banjo players ==
A listing of celebrities who play the banjo include:

=== A ===
- Al Capone

=== B ===
- Syd Barrett
- Lindsey Buckingham

=== C ===
- Howard Caine
- Billy Connolly
- David Crowder

=== D ===
- Kirk Douglas

=== G ===
- Jerry Garcia
- Charlie Grimm

=== H ===
- Ed Helms

=== I ===
- Burl Ives

=== J ===
- Rian Johnson

=== L ===
- Larry Lalonde
- John Lennon

=== M ===
- Taj Mahal
- Barbara Mandrell
- Winston Marshall
- Steve Martin
- Bill Mumy

=== O ===
- Martin O'Malley
- Donny Osmond

=== S ===
- George Segal

=== T ===
- Peter Tork

=== V ===
- Jerry Van Dyke

=== W ===
- Stephen Welch
- Hank Williams III
- Maury Wills

=== Y ===
- Neil Young

== See also ==
- Lists of musicians
