= Peninsula Banjo Band =

American musical group and non-profit foundation

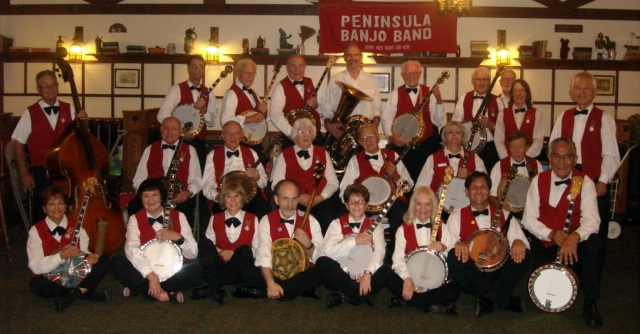
- Peninsula Banjo Band; August 28, 2013

Background information
- Origin: Cupertino, California
- Genres: Jazz, dixieland, ragtime
- Years active: 1963–present
- Labels: PBB Records, DiscMakers, Suspect Studios
- Website: www.peninsulabanjoband.org

The Peninsula Banjo Band is an American musical group and 501(c)(3) non-profit foundation dedicated to preserving the musical legacy of the four-string banjo as well as raising money for cancer-related and other notable charities. The group is based in Northern California, around San Jose and San Francisco and has performed publicly every week since 1966 (over 2000 performances). One of its other contributions is in the form of music education (scholarships), frequent free public performances, and the hosting of an annual jazz festival that has featured the best of the professional and amateur banjo community since the 1970s. Formed in 1963, the PBB is known worldwide as one of North America's premier banjo jazz groups that has headlined numerous times over its history and been the opening act for notable entertainers and musical groups of the 1970s, 1980s, 1990s, and 2000s.

== History ==
=== Formation and early years ===
The band that eventually became the Peninsula Banjo Band was formed by Chuck Ray Sr. in 1963. Ray was a music teacher and local musician in the South Bay area. Ray could often be found performing with his plectrum banjo at the Shakey's Pizza and Big Al's pizza parlors in San Jose, California.

In 1962 a group of Ray's students approached him about forming a band. Ray agreed and an informal group was formed. As the group practiced together and improved they were eventually asked to entertain in public. They called themselves the Cupertino Banjo Band and the original nine members were Glenn Atkinson, Jerry Deerwester, Don Flora, Pearl Nicolino, Chuck Ray Sr., Manuel Rodriques, Steve Sedlak, Sidney Steele, and Merle Wilhelm. Later, as the group increased in size, they temporarily called themselves the Golden Gate Banjo Band. Then in 1971, as an acknowledgment that band members came from a much larger area than Cupertino, they came up with the name Peninsula Banjo Band. The band included members from as far south as Santa Cruz and as far north as Burlingame.

=== New band leader ===
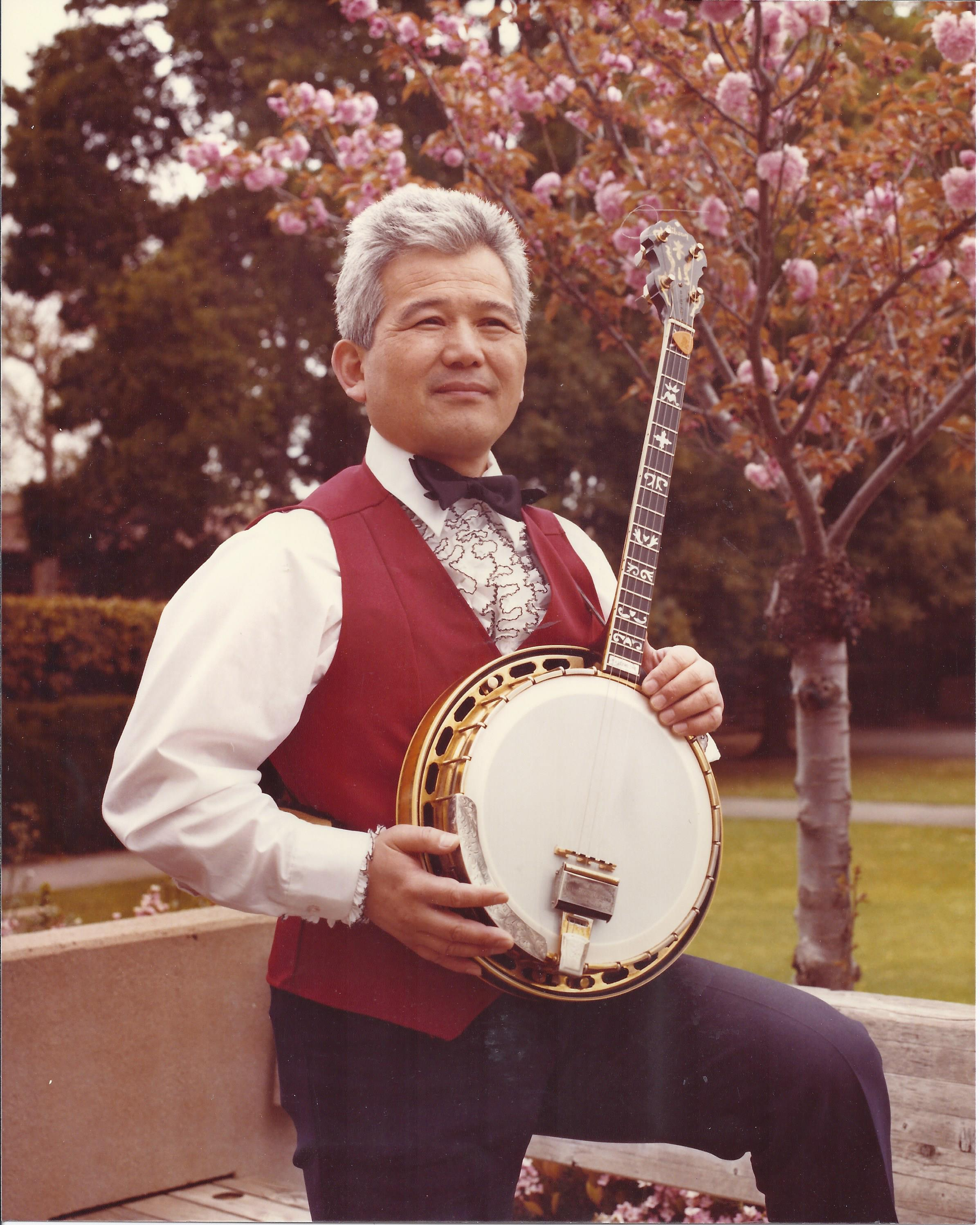
Charlie Tagawa in the 80s

In 1964, the owner of the Sakura Gardens restaurant in Mountain View, California was in Tokyo for the summer Olympics and discovered a young devotee of famous banjoist Harry Reser. This young performer was Zenzo Tagawa. The restaurant owner was so impressed by Tagawa's skill with a tenor banjo that he offered him a contract to play at his restaurant in the U.S.

After reaching the United States, Zenzo Tagawa was rapidly Americanized to Charlie Tagawa and soon after he was discovered by numerous restaurant patrons as well as other banjo players in the area. Tagawa played regularly at Sakura Gardens and its successor restaurant, Imperial Gardens, for fifteen years. On many evenings, one or another of Tagawa's banjo or gutbucket-playing friends would drop in to listen or to jam with him. As word traveled of Tagawa's playing skill, he was asked to join the Cupertino Banjo Band. He did so and became their leader in 1966. He has remained so for all but two of the subsequent forty-six years. After taking up residence in Cupertino, Tagawa became a banjo teacher that specialized in teaching young children and teenagers to play the 4-string banjo.

=== Non-profit incorporation ===
In 1974 in preparation to apply as a charitable nonprofit California corporation the group elected Tagawa as president. This filing was a first step towards gaining 501-c-3 non-profit status. The group was awarded non-profit status by the Internal Revenue Service in 1976.

=== Past presidents ===
Succeeding presidents have included Leo Campey, Glenn Atkinson, Cas Stockard, Bob Delaney, Chuck Daley, Terry Bull, John Goulais, Carl Adams, Paul Nearhood, Tom James, Gene Ripley, Helen Wick Martin, George Thum, Ray Ferrie, Flo Lewis, Floyd Oatman, Steve Adkins, Jim Strickland, Bob Lasley of Scarlett LaRue's jazz club, and Christopher Bracher. Notable contributions by band presidents are the overseeing of the band's four recordings. Leo Campey accomplished the inaugural recording in 1975 with the production and release of Just Because. This was followed by a recording made by Tagawa's Junior Banjo Band in 1976 with the assistance of Glenn Atkinson. Chuck Daley followed suit respectively with More! More! More! in 1981 and Just One More Time in 1996. In 2008 Jim Strickland accomplished what no other previous band president had achieved, he convinced music director Charlie Tagawa to make a professional recording of several of his virtuoso performances. That Charlie Sound is the result and is the only professionally produced recording capturing Tagawa's skill as a soloist.

Jim Strickland in addition to having the band's longest tenure as president, nine years, is responsible for the organization and production of the band's first concert hall symphony-style performance to exclusively feature the PBB. On March 28, 2004, the band performed at the Le Petit Trianon Theater in San Jose, California for just over two hours. Fans were presented a historical journey through the various eras of banjo music that was narrated by Strickland with a short verbal introduction to each piece and mention of its historical significance. Special guest performers were Bill Lowrey, Kevin McCabe, and Steve Peterson. The session was recorded and in keeping with band tradition limited edition CDs were distributed to band members.

There have been notable contributions by non-president band members as well. The late Gene Sandberg is credited with the restart of the band's newsletter, titled "PBB News & Views", in 2001. It was originally distributed in printed form and mailed to each band and auxiliary member plus selected fans and people in the banjo community. Gene compiled, edited, and published the newsletter for several years until retiring from his post. The duty was then taken over by Jim Strickland. Around the same time Strickland starting researching and writing a series of articles about the history of the music and lyric writers for the songs in the PBB's library. These became known as the banjo music story books.

=== Charitable giving ===
The earliest known charitable donation by the band was made to the Braille Fund. Two members of the band were blind, Emil Hakkila and George Chung. Charitable contributions then and since have always favored those organizations having some emotional connection to the group.

In 1970, band member Keith Pinckney, the 10-year-old son of fellow band members Bob Pinckney and 12-year-old brother Doug Pinckney was diagnosed with leukemia. Keith Pinckney died from this disease a year later. During that time he was treated regularly at Stanford University Hospital by Dr. Jordan Wilbur, a pediatric oncologist on the full-time faculty. The band's donations were made for the next twenty years to Dr. Wilbur's research efforts at the Stanford University Hospital.

Starting in 1994, the band has broadened the scope of its donations to other kinds of groups and organizations. As band members became ill or died, donations were often made in their name to organizations or causes designated by their family. Some of these organizations include the Diabetic Society of Santa Clara, the American Diabetes Association, the San Jose Visiting Nurse's Association, and the Ronald MacDonald House in Palo Alto.

The foundation portion of the organization, separate from the musical group, has established a scholarship program for banjo lessons and washtub bass (gutbucket) training. In memory of band members Ray Ferrie and George Seeband who bequeathed their banjos to the band, those wishing to learn to play the plectrum banjo are awarded a "Ray Ferrie Scholarship" and those studying tenor are awarded a "George Seeband Scholarship". Both are granted the use of their respective banjos during the term of their scholarship if they do not have an instrument.

== Notable performances and recordings ==
Although there is no official record, the song "Just Because" has been the theme song of the band since roughly 1966. It has been the opening number for the PBB at every performance including weekly practices, jazz festivals, TV shows, and bookings since the 1970s.

The band's primary source of funds permitting charitable donations and scholarships has been playouts or bookings - "gigs" in musician vernacular. The band's popularity in this endeavor has varied considerably over the years, but since 2000 this has amounted to about two to four playouts per month. In addition to the standard and recurring array of local playouts, the band has enjoyed numerous unique engagements in around the South Bay; e.g., playing the National Anthem at a San Francisco Giants baseball game at Candlestick Park, the 50th anniversary of the Golden Gate Bridge, the De Young Museum, numerous Cherry Blossom Festivals in San Francisco's Japan town, Black and White Ball's, the grand reopening of San Francisco's cable car line, for President Bill Clinton and later Vice President Al Gore at Democratic Party fund raisers in Portola Valley, California, and the Conference of Mayors (where then Mayor Willie Brown directed the band for a short stint and did a little cakewalk). The band was also on the program for the completion and grand opening of California state Highway 85, the opening of San Jose's McEnery Convention Center, the opening ceremonies of San Jose's The Tech Museum of Innovation (The Tech), and Martin Luther King Jr. library.

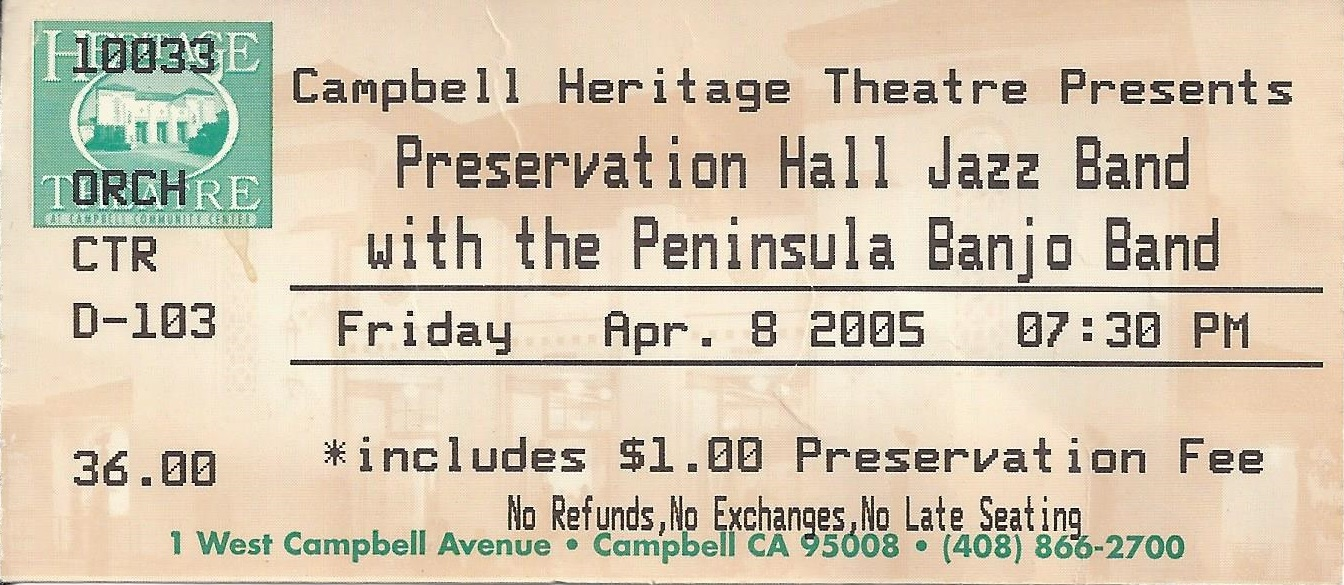
2005 ticket when the PBB opened for the Preservation Hall Jazz Band

Additionally the band has had several notable engagements where they were the opening act or participants in the kickoff of events. These performances include opening for Patti Page (1981), the Captain & Tennille (1982), the Preservation Hall Jazz Band (2005), the Duke Ellington Orchestra (2006), and the opening ceremonies of the MLB All Star Game Fanfest (2007).

Filmed in June 2001 (airing in October), the band was featured along with Charlie Tagawa in a segment of the television show Bay Area Backroads hosted by Doug McConnell and produced for Bay Area station KRON, an NBC affiliate. This is in addition to appearances on KPIX's Evening Magazine from 1976 to 1991 and other San Francisco Bay Area television shows.

The band made its first recording in 1975, The Peninsula Banjo Band presents - Just Because, released on LP. It recorded in 1981 More! More! More! which was released on both LP record and audio tape. Then in 1996, Just One More Time was released on tape CD. A fourth was recorded in 2008, That Charlie Sound, and is the band's most involved effort to date. The CD includes fifteen tracks by the main band and features music director Charlie Tagawa with a small combo that includes his sons Nori and Leon with Bill Lowrey.

== The Banjo Jubilee Jazz Festival ==
In 1972 the band started preparations for the first of a series of annual banjo celebrations. This annual show debuted in 1973 in Palo Alto, California and became the band's premiere musical event to showcase the banjo talent of the world to the San Francisco Bay Area. The band also sponsored its 1st International Banjo Jubilee in San Jose in 1975. Headliners included Peter Meyer (Germany), Clem Vickery (England), Maurice Bolyer (Canada) and Charlie Tagawa (Japan).

The Banjo Jubilee also became one of the band's most significant sources of contributions for charitable giving. The original intention was the donation of its profits to Dr. Richard Wilbur's pediatric oncology department at Stanford Hospital. In the early years of the Banjo Jubilees, Dr. Wilbur would often attend a Jubilee and speak on stage thanking the band for its generous contributions and support of his efforts to battle cancer.

Over the years, the Banjo Jubilees have featured a "Who's Who" roll call of the banjo and American jazz community. The format includes a mix of large bands combined with soloists. Repeat performers at the Jubilee include the Sacramento Banjo Band (the only banjo band older than the PBB in California) and the East Bay Banjo Band. Featured soloists are almost too numerous to list, but include Buddy Wachter, Béla Fleck, Don Vappie (of Preservation Hall in New Orleans), and the late Scotty Plummer.

In 2009, the 37th annual Jubilee was held over a weekend in September in San Jose. It followed the typical format of previous years. There was a pre-Jubilee party Friday evening, a workshop and jam session Saturday afternoon followed by a banquet that evening. The main show of the festival was held from noon to 5:00 pm on Sunday. The program played to an audience of roughly 900 and featured seven large banjo bands, two professional soloists, and dixieland band from Tokyo, the Banjo Stompers.

In 2010, the Jubilee was a benefit for Hospice of the Valley. An organization that it has been associated with and made contributions to since its inception in 1979. The headliner of the festival was a banjoist from Tokyo, Japan, Ken Aoki. This appearance was Aoki's U.S. debut. The 2010 Jubilee jazz festival took place on September 12, 2010.

In 2011, the Jubilee was a benefit for Japan earthquake, tsunami, and typhoon relief efforts and took place on Sunday, September 11. The headliners were Fred "Mickey" Finn with Cathy Reilly.

In 2012, the 40th Annual Banjo Jubilee Jazz Festival took place on Sunday, September 9. The headline performer was Tyler Jackson.

== Members and public practices ==
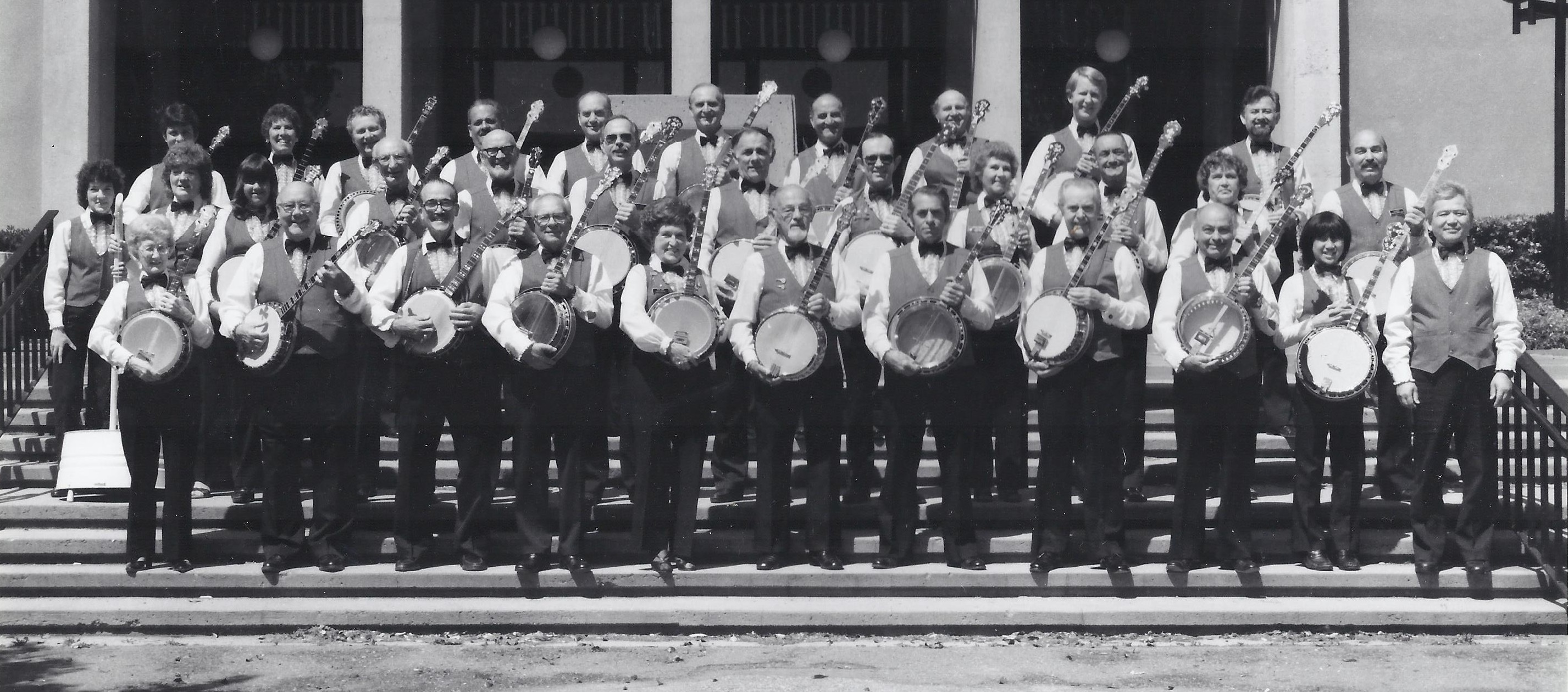
1970s

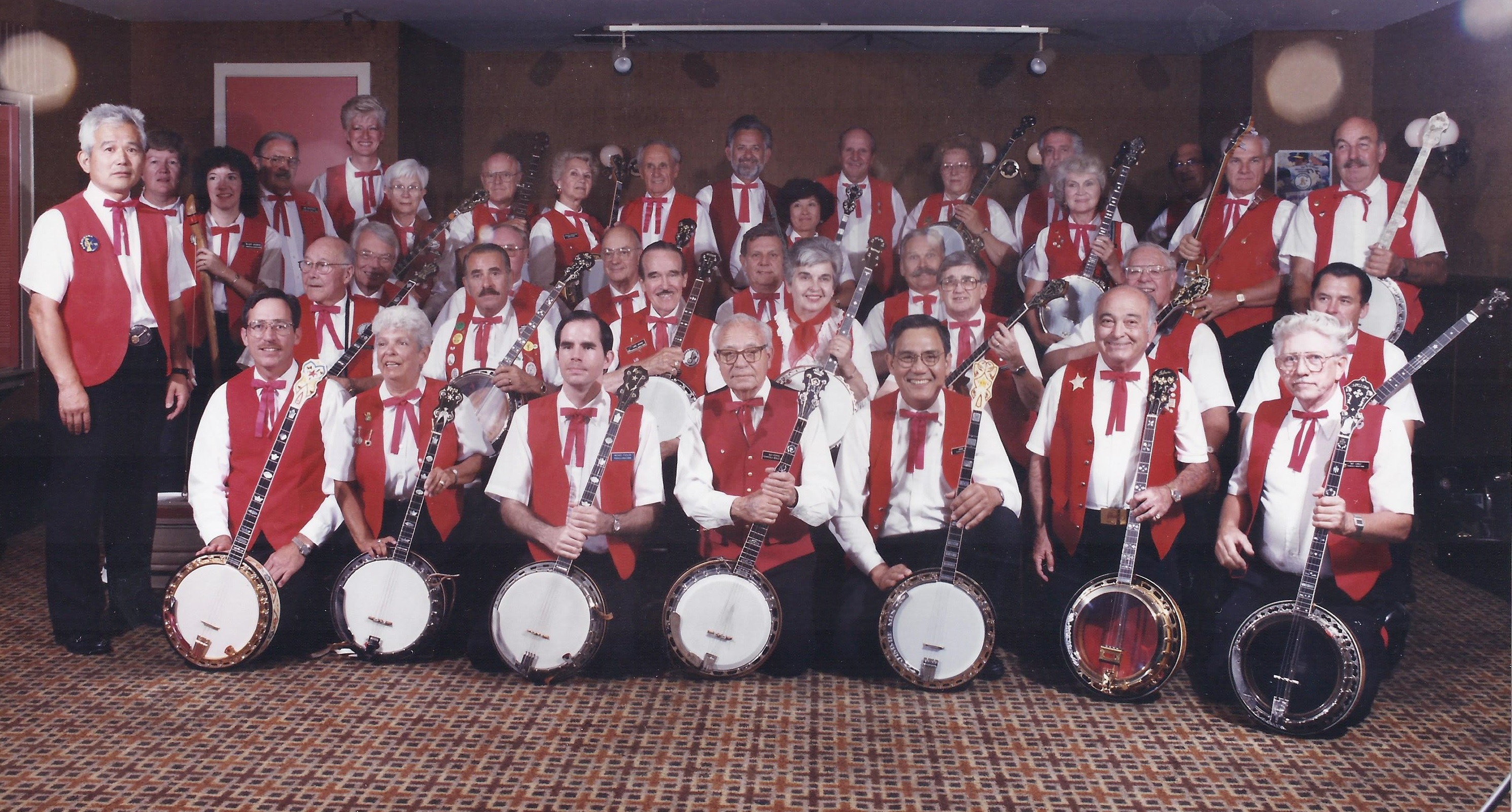
1990s

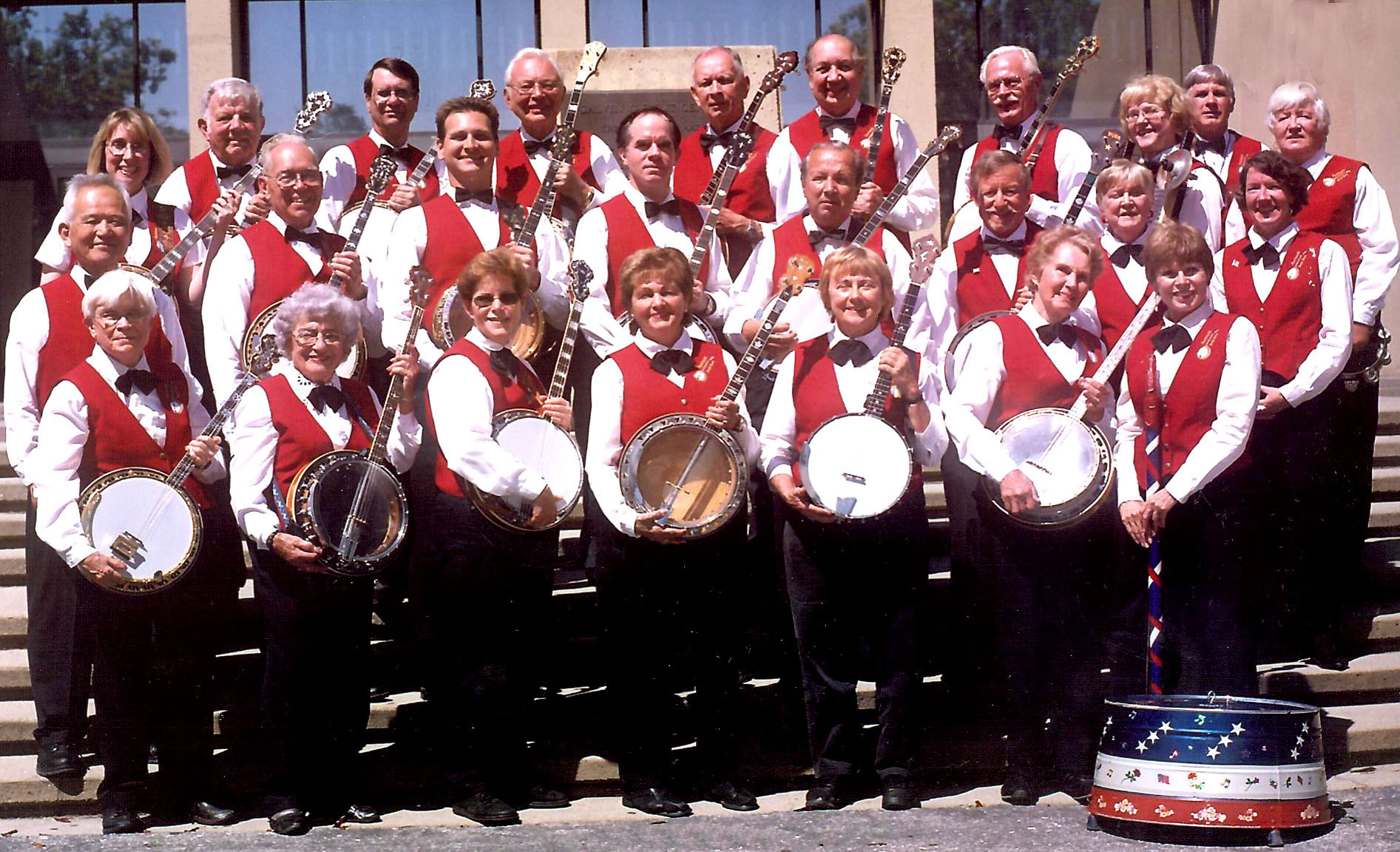
July 2003

Membership has varied from the original nine banjo players to well over a hundred. It includes both banjo and gut bucket (washtub bass) players plus a Band Auxiliary. From its humble beginnings in the basement of the Cupertino Music Store, the PBB did not have an official public venue until 1966. Having outgrown the music store, a gentleman by the name of Ward Pinther offered to host the band at his Straw Hat Pizza Palace in Campbell, California. This hospitality lasted for the next 24 years until Pinther's retirement and the closing of the restaurant. Not to be deterred, the band moved to yet another Straw Hat Pizza restaurant in the nearby San Jose neighborhood of Willow Glen. So from 1966 until Tuesday, June 16, 2009, the band entertained crowds every Tuesday evening at a Straw Hat Pizza restaurant. During the band's heyday in the 1970s and 1980s, it was not unusual to have four rows of twenty to twenty five banjo players performing plus as many as eight gutbucket players and a tuba. The sound produced by a hundred or more banjos is unique and unlike anything else in the world of acoustic performances.

In a change made to the bylaws in 2000, categories of membership were formally established. Playing members originally made up the band and were the only people who qualified to be Board members. Auxiliary members do not perform, but contribute to the band with their time and services. These services range from assisting with promotional mailings to staffing the Banjo Jubilee. A former member is someone who resigns from the band or who has not attended a practice or performance for at least three years. Both playing and auxiliary members have voting rights as long as they meet certain annual criteria laid out in the Standing Rules of the Bylaws. An honorary member is any person who has made significant contribution to the objectives of the Peninsula Banjo Band and are elected after nomination by the Board of Directors. Honorary members may not vote nor serve on the Board of Directors.

In the summer of 2009 the band was faced with a serious problem. Their current venue announced that it was closing. For only the second time in over forty years the band was about to lose their weekly performance venue. A search was launched to find a suitable location. After a review of seemingly every "banjo friendly" establishment in the South Bay of the San Francisco Bay Area, yet another pizza restaurant owner offered to host the band. For a short four months Vito's Pizzeria in Sunnyvale, California was the home of the PBB. As word traveled of the band's new venue, crowd's often exceeded the rated maximum for the restaurant. The owner relished the large, hungry, and usually very thirsty audiences that the band attracted, but this was short lived. Citing the need for more space, the band set out to find yet another weekly performance venue. Retired night club owner and veteran band member Bob Lasley suggested that the band give a different restaurant in Sunnyvale a try. In September of that year the band moved to a different location in Sunnyvale, Cabritos restaurant, and changed the day of their performances to Wednesdays. There is a consistent audience with a large percentage being individuals who have attended regularly for years. Visiting banjo players and other performers are welcome to play with the group upon receiving permission from Charlie Tagawa or the presiding band leader of the evening.

In the spring of 2010 the band made a format change to its weekly performances. Hearkening back to the band's original Straw Hat Pizza restaurant era on Campbell Ave., the band again performs two sets. The first is conducted by Music Director, Charlie Tagawa, in somewhat of a concert style that provides the opportunity for the group to hone its group performance skills. Then after a brief intermission for announcements band veteran and featured performer Bill Lowrey assumes direction of the band when in attendance. Lowrey's leading style is reminiscent of the second set jam sessions of the band's early days that were often led by former band president Terry Bull and included the singing of band favorites by Leo Campey and Carl Adams. These days it is Lowrey and band members Bob Lasley, Sam Morocco, and Joyce Taylor taking turns at the microphone along with the occasional guest singer.

In the fall of 2011, the events of 2009 were repeated with the band's current performance venue announcing its impending closure. Again a search was made to find another suitable location and once again (then) band president, musician, and veteran night club manager Bob Lasley came to the rescue. Through his efforts and musical connections Lasley arranged for the band to perform at one of the Harry's Hofbrau restaurants in San Jose. The band has since performed on Wednesday evenings from 7:00pm to roughly 8:30pm and has continued its alternate band leader second sets.

== Non-profit structure and charitable foundation ==
In 1972 the band began efforts to incorporate as a California non-profit corporation and in preparation for filing to be recognized as a non-profit by the IRS. Articles of incorporation and bylaws were drafted and by a vote of the band membership adopted in 1974.

The band is currently governed by a seven-member Board of Directors. Voting members consist of the band president, secretary, treasurer, membership director, music director, booking agent, and communications director. Other positions and duties are appointed by the president or Board as needed. These positions include, but are not limited to, the Auxiliary chairperson, Scholarship Committee chairperson, and Jubilee producer, formerly the Jubilee chairperson.

Board meetings are monthly, with elections held on the evening of the first weekly practice session of each December with instant inauguration of the new officers. There is no limitation on the duration one may hold an office, but no one may hold two offices at the same time. The Minutes of each meeting of the Board of Directors are published in the band's monthly newsletter, “PBB News and Views” in which playout announcements and other items of general interest are published.

The band has enjoyed and benefited from the efforts of numerous board members over the decades. Many of the band's members were (and still are) engineers, executives, and administrators from various Silicon Valley companies such as FMC, IBM, Lockheed Martin, and Xerox. Record keeping has been fastidious over the years with the band still in possession of meeting minutes and the personal notes of individual board members going back to 1973.

One of the band's most valuable assets is its cumulative library of arrangements from which selections are made that make up its periodically changing band music book. In the early years the band book was a stack of over 150 hand written arrangements that was copied and handed off from member to member. New songs were distributed by the band librarian who maintains the master copy.

In 1996, then president Ray Ferrie encouraged the authoring of a uniform and consistent band music book. Band member Joy Birdsley took on the enormous task of editing and producing the first edition. Then in 2000 after numerous changes and updates had been made, he took on the task yet again. This time the book was converted into a computer based music scoring program format and became a compendium of custom arrangements that is similar in format to many of the arrangements used by professional orchestras.

As noted on the band music book's first page:

"This book is intended for the use of the members of the Peninsula Banjo Band for instruction & training and to provide consistency & uniformity in the playing of music for practice sessions and curing public performances. This book is furnished free to band members and is not for sale.

"This book is dedicated to the late Ray Ferrie, who was instrumental, as president of the PBB in 1996, in encouraging and authorizing the first edition of a bound book of music for the PBB. This book is also dedicated to (the late) Joy Birdsley who edited and produced that first edition and who was in the process of producing this, the (2000) second edition, until he had to withdraw for health reasons."

The music book consists almost entirely of arrangements by Charlie Tagawa. In recent years, some band Librarians have created specialized books with selections of music for special seasons or performances such as a Christmas music book and special Jubilee music books.

== Discography ==
- Just Because (PBB Recordings, 1976, first edition on LP & cassette)
- More! More! More! (PBB Recordings, 1981, first edition on LP & cassette)
- Just One More Time! (PBB Recordings, 1996, first edition on CD & cassette)
- Just Because, second edition (Discmakers, 2002, digitally remastered, reissued on CD)
- More! More! More!, second edition (Discmakers, 2002, digitally remastered, reissued on CD)
- That Charlie Sound (Suspect Studios/Discmakers, 2008, first edition on CD)

== See also ==
- Four-string banjo
- List of banjo players
- List of jazz festivals
