= American Banjo Museum Hall of Fame members =

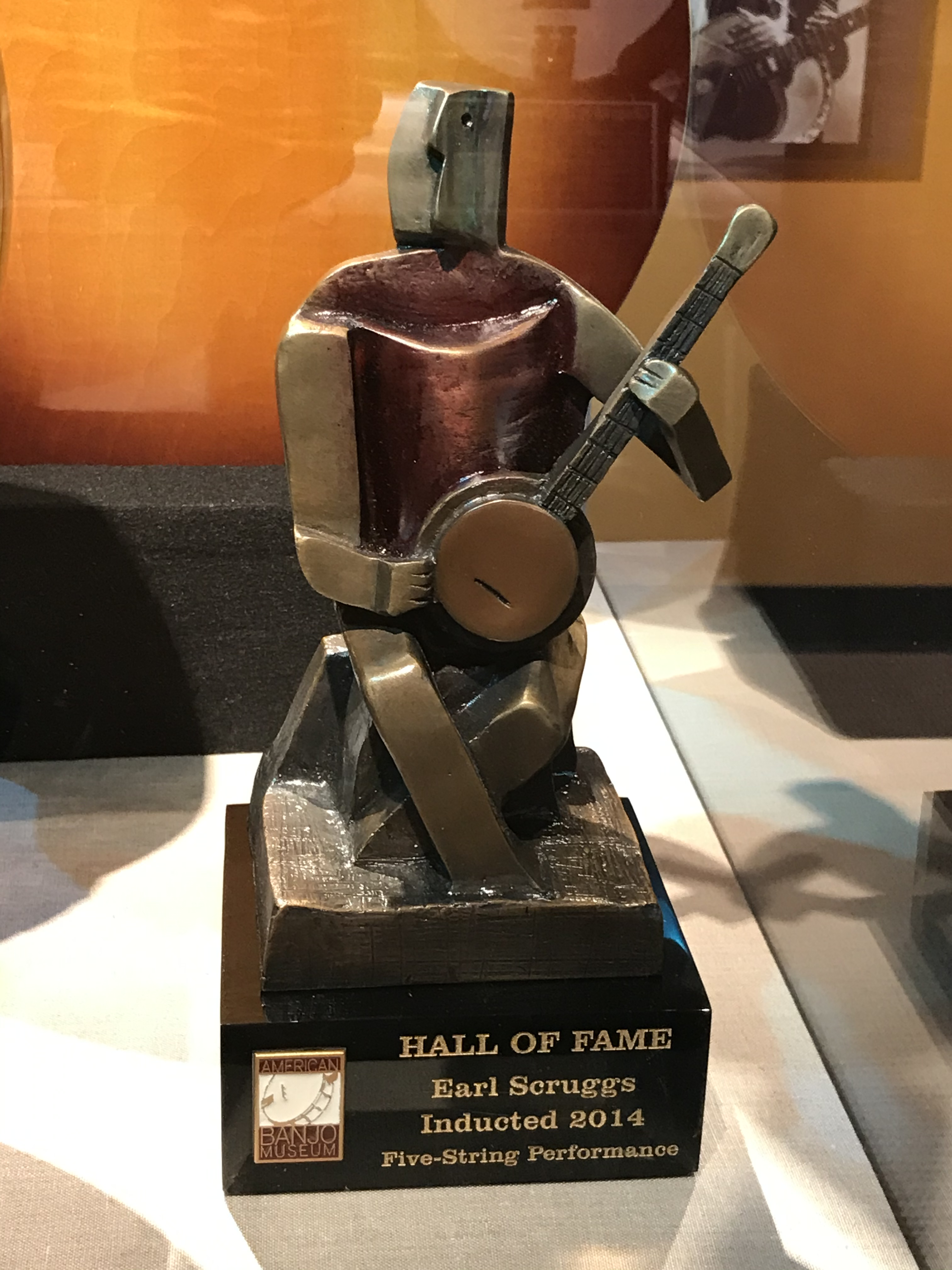
2014 American Banjo Museum Hall of Fame Award for Earl Scruggs

The American Banjo Museum Hall of Fame, formerly known as the National Four-String Banjo Hall of Fame, recognizes musicians. bands, or companies that have made a distinct contribution to banjo performance, education, manufacturing, and towards promotion of the banjo. The hall of fame is a part of the American Banjo Museum located in Oklahoma City, Oklahoma.

When the National Four-String Banjo Hall of Fame Museum became the American Banjo Museum in 2009, its focus began to shift to be more inclusive of all banjos. Originally focusing on four-string banjo players, the hall of fame expanded in 2013 to recognize contributions from 5-string banjo players as well, allowing them to be recognized in "non-performance categories" and creating a category specific to 5-string banjo players. The first 5-string banjoists were added to the hall of fame beginning in 2014.

Inductees into the American Banjo Museum Hall of Fame in 2018 include Bela Fleck (5-string performance), Borgy Borgerson (4-string performance), Jim Henson (promotion), Hub Nitsche and the Banjo Newsletter (both instruction and education), and Eddie Collins (historical). The 2019 inductees include Alison Brown (five-string performance), Johnny Baier (4-string performance), Jimmy Mazzy (4-string performance), John Hartford (historical), Bob Snow (promotion), and Janet Davis (instruction and education).

== 5-String Performance ==
- 2014 - Earl Scruggs
- 2015 - Pete Seeger
- 2016 - J.D. Crowe
- 2017 - John McEuen
- 2018 - Bela Fleck
- 2019 - Alison Brown
- 2020 - Gary "Biscuit" Davis
- 2021 - Jens Krüger
- 2022 - Sonny Osborne
- 2023 - Buck Trent
- 2024 - Kristin Scott Benson
- 2025 - Noam Pikelny
- 2026 - Mark Johnson

== 4-String Performance ==
- 1998 - Marvin "Smokey" Montgomery / C. Sandy Riner
- 1999 - Eddie Peabody / Harry Reser
- 2000 - Don Van Palta / Perry Bechtel
- 2001 - Buddy Wachter / Roy Smeck
- 2002 - Tim Allan / Johnny St. Cyr
- 2003 - Cathy Reilly Finn / Scotty Plummer
- 2004 - Al Smith / Freddy Morgan
- 2005 - Doug Mattocks / Michael Pingitore
- 2006 - Cynthia Sayer / Pat Terry, Sr.
- 2007 - Georgette Twain / John Cali
- 2008 - Jad Paul / Maurice Bolyer
- 2009 - John Becker / Buck Kelly
- 2010 - Dave Marty / Helen Baker
- 2011 - Greg Allen / Gene Sheldon
- 2012 - Lee Floyd III / Skip DeVol
- 2013 - Mike Gentry / Eddie Connors
- 2014 - Debbie Schreyer / Elmer Snowden
- 2015 - Eddy Davis
- 2016 - Pat Terry, Jr.
- 2017 - Paul Erikson
- 2018 - Borgy Borgerson
- 2019 - Johnny Baier / Jimmy Mazzy
- 2020 - Eddie Erickson
- 2021 - Brad Roth
- 2022 - Don Vappie
- 2023 - Kurt Abell
- 2024 - Ken Aoki
- 2025 - Sean Moyses

== Historical ==
- 2016 - George Formby
- 2017 - Joel Walker Sweeney
- 2018 - Eddie Collins
- 2019 - John Hartford
- 2020 - Don Reno
- 2021 - Paul Buskirk
- 2022 - The Banjo Kings
- 2023 - Grandpa Jones
- 2024 - Ralph Stanley
- 2025 - Fred Van Eps

== Instruction & Education ==
- 2001 - Mel Bay
- 2002 - Lowell Schreyer
- 2003 - Charlie Tagawa
- 2004 - Charles McNeil
- 2005 - Buddy Griffin
- 2006 - Walter Kaye Bauer
- 2007 - Don Van Palta
- 2008 - Don Stevison
- 2009 - Dave Frey
- 2010 - Jim Riley
- 2011 - Daryl Whiting
- 2012 - Buddy Wachter
- 2013 - Steve Caddick
- 2014 - Mike Currao
- 2015 - Tim Allan
- 2016 - Alfred Greathouse
- 2017 - Tony Trischka
- 2018 - Hub Nitsche & Banjo Newsletter
- 2019 - Janet Davis
- 2020 - Roger Sprung
- 2021 - Scott Whitfield
- 2022 - Alan Munde
- 2024 - Bill Evans
- 2025 - Vinnie Mondello

== Design & Manufacture ==
- 2003 - C.C. Richelieu
- 2004 - Fred Bacon & Daniel Day
- 2005 - Renee Karnes
- 2006 - Gibson Mandolin-Guitar Mfg. Co, Ltd. & Gibson Instrument Company
- 2007 - Wm. Lange/Paramount
- 2008 - Dale Small
- 2009 - Henry Lea
- 2010 - Chuck Ogsbury/OME
- 2011 - Vega
- 2012 - Jim Farquhar
- 2013 - Wayne Fairchild
- 2014 - David L. Day
- 2015 - Albert D. Grover
- 2016 - Deering Banjo Company
- 2020 - Geoff Stelling
- 2021 - Greg Rich
- 2023 - Norbert Pietsch

== Promotion ==
- 2000 - Sherwood "Shakey" Johnson
- 2001 - Frank Rossi
- 2001 - Jack Canine
- 2002 - Jubilee Banjo Band
- 2003 - Ralph Martin
- 2004 - Fred "Mickey" Finn
- 2005 - Joel Schiavone
- 2006 - Eddy Davis
- 2007 - Walt Disney Company
- 2008 - Jack Dupen, Harry Higgins (album The Red Garter)
- 2009 - Myron Hinkle
- 2010 - Bill Pincumbe
- 2011 - Horis Ward
- 2012 - Glenn Parks
- 2013 - Somethin' Smith and the Redheads
- 2014 - The Kingston Trio
- 2015 - Steve Martin
- 2017 - Roy Clark
- 2018 - Jim Henson
- 2019 - Bob Snow
- 2022 - Randy Morris
- 2023 - Akira Tsumura
- 2024 - Ned Luberecki
- 2025 - Dom Flemons

== See also ==
- List of banjo players
- List of museums in Oklahoma
