= Banjo music =

- Stylistic origins: Appalachian folk music, African folk music, bluegrass, gospel, western swing, anglo-celtic music, old-time music, blues, New-age music
- Cultural origins: Africa, Southern United States
- Typical instruments: Guitar, bass, electric bass guitar, dobro, electric guitar, steel guitar, pedal steel guitar, mandolin, banjo, double bass, fiddle, piano, keyboard, drums, harmonica

Other topics
- Country musicians - List of years in country music

Banjo music is a genre of music that consists exclusively, or primarily of, the banjo. Banjo music can be played as a solo, or it can be played with a band. Banjo music can be played with all types of banjos (four, five, or six string).

== History ==
Banjo music originated informally as a form of African folk music over a hundred years ago probably in the sub-Saharan region. When the Americans forced African slaves to work on the plantations, banjo music followed them, and stayed primarily a form of African folk music, up to the 1800s. It was during this time that the banjo in all probability was first introduced to Ireland, when the Virginia Minstrels toured in England, Ireland and France in 1843, 1844 and 1845. With his minstrel shows, Joel Walker Sweeney is credited with extending the popularity of the banjo as well as its music to an enormous audience all over the United States and Europe.

With the spread of popularity of the banjo, it influenced different kinds of music - it gave rise to mountain string bands, and even helped give a foundation for blues music. The occurrences of hootenannies gave a house to banjo music, where it made its place in American folk music and bluegrass. American television shows such as Hee Haw have made banjo music all the more popular, and more a part of American culture.

== Distinctives ==
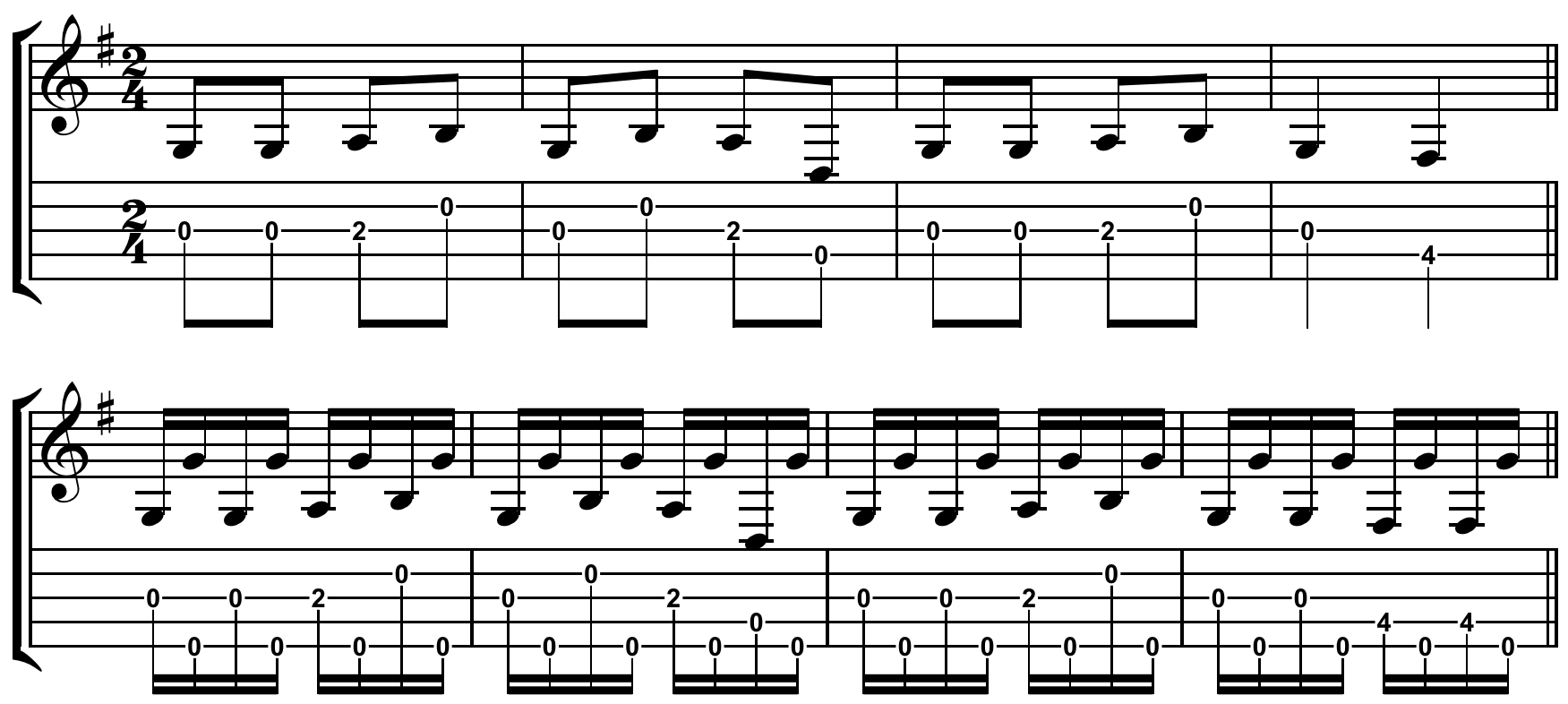
Melody to Yankee Doodle, on the banjo, without and with drone notes and with drone.

Unlike most other solo music pieces played by various instruments, banjo music does not only consist of a melody, but it also utilizes drone notes to make the music seem like it is being played by more than one instrument. While very basic compositions will consist of only melodies, more complicated pieces will have multiple drone notes, usually organized in a predictable roll pattern. Banjo music tends to be very lively and upbeat, as the fast-occurring drone notes tend to give the illusion that a song is being played quite fast. Banjo music is not usually amplified (except by aid of a microphone), as the banjo's resonator allows it to be played quite loud.

== Most popular banjo music songs ==
Popular banjo music pieces include:

- Dueling Banjos
- Foggy Mountain Breakdown
- Cripple Creek
- Blackberry Blossom
- Cotton Eyed Joe
- I'll Fly Away
- Wildwood Flower

== Notable names in banjo music ==
- Eddie Peabody was the greatest proponent of the plectrum banjo in the early to mid twentieth century. Prominent contemporary plectrum players include Cynthia Sayer.
- Earl Scruggs was the greatest three-finger picker of the mid to late twentieth century, and continued to play into the early 21st century.
- Roy Clark played banjo on the show Hee Haw, and made it quite popular in the realm of American music.

== See also ==
- Fret
- List of banjo players
- List of National Four-String Banjo Hall of Fame members
