= Dodoo =

Dodoo may refer to:

- Afo Dodoo, Ghanaian footballer
- Francis Dodoo, Ghanaian athlete
- Joe Dodoo, English footballer
- Dodoo, Iran, a village in Hormozgan Province, Iran
