= Jeff Hughes (musician) =

American traditional jazz cornet player

Jeff Hughes is an American traditional jazz cornet player.

Hughes plays and records with several bands including The Wolverine Jazz Band, The Paramount Jazz Band, The Brahmin Bellhops and has also extensively recorded with banjoist Jimmy Mazzy. He has previously played with bands such as The Salmon City Seven, Swingland Express (led by John Holte), the Bob Connors' New Yankee Rhythm Kings and the Blue Horizon Jazz Band.

He currently lives in Falmouth, Massachusetts.
