= Dudow =

Dudow may refer to:

- Slatan Dudow, Bulgarian film director
- Dudow, Iran, a village in Hormozgan Province, Iran
