= Let's Get Started If We're Gonna Break My Heart =

Single by The Statler Brothers

from the album Greatest Hits
- B-side: "Guilty"
- Released: October 15, 1988
- Genre: Country
- Length: 3:02
- Label: Mercury
- Songwriter(s): Don Reid, Harold Reid
- Producer(s): Jerry Kennedy

The Statler Brothers singles chronology
| "Am I Crazy?" (1988) | "Let's Get Started If We're Gonna Break My Heart" (1988) | "Moon Pretty Moon" (1989) |

"Let's Get Started If We're Gonna Break My Heart" is a song written by Don Reid and Harold Reid, and recorded by American country music group The Statler Brothers. It was released in October 1988 as the first single from their Greatest Hits compilation album. The song reached #12 on the Billboard Hot Country Singles & Tracks chart.

== Chart performance ==
| Chart (1988–1989) | Peak position |
|---|---|
| US Hot Country Songs (Billboard) | 12 |
