= Doudou =

Doudou may refer to:

== People ==
As a surname

- Émile Boga Doudou (1952–2002), Ivorian politician
- Rose Doudou Guéï (died 2002), predecessor of Simone Gbagbo as First Lady of Côte d'Ivoire

As a given name

- Doudou, a character in the Singaporean Chinese drama Rhapsody in Blue
- Doudou (born 1980), a French footballer who played for AS Monaco and Queens Park Rangers
- Doudou Aouate (born 1977), Israeli football goalkeeper
- Doudou Diaw (born 1975), Senegalese football player
- Doudou Diène (born 1941), United Nations Special Rapporteur on contemporary forms of racism, racial discrimination
- Doudou Gouirand (born 1940), French jazz saxophonist and composer
- Doudou Gueye, former leader of the Senegalese Popular Movement
- Doudou Masta (born 1971), French hip-hop artist
- Doudou Mangni (born 1993), Italian footballer
- Doudou N'Diaye Rose (1930–2015), Senegalese drummer, composer and band leader
- Doudou Ndoye (born 1944), Senegalese lawyer and politician
- Doudou Thiam (1926–1999), Senegalese diplomat, politician and lawyer
- Doudou Touré (born 1991), Mauritanian footballer

As a nickname

- Lin Liheng (born 1944), Chinese former soldier commonly known by the nickname "Doudou"

== Other ==
- Ducasse de Mons, a popular feast that happens every year during the Trinity Sunday in the town of Mons, Belgium
- Doudou, a sub-division of the French Indian rupee
- "Doudou" (song), a 2020 song by Aya Nakamura
- Dudou, a female undergarment and blouse diminutively known as a doudou in Chinese
- Moukalaba-Doudou National Park, Gabon

== See also ==
- Dudu (disambiguation)
