= Charlie Tagawa =

Japanese-born American musician

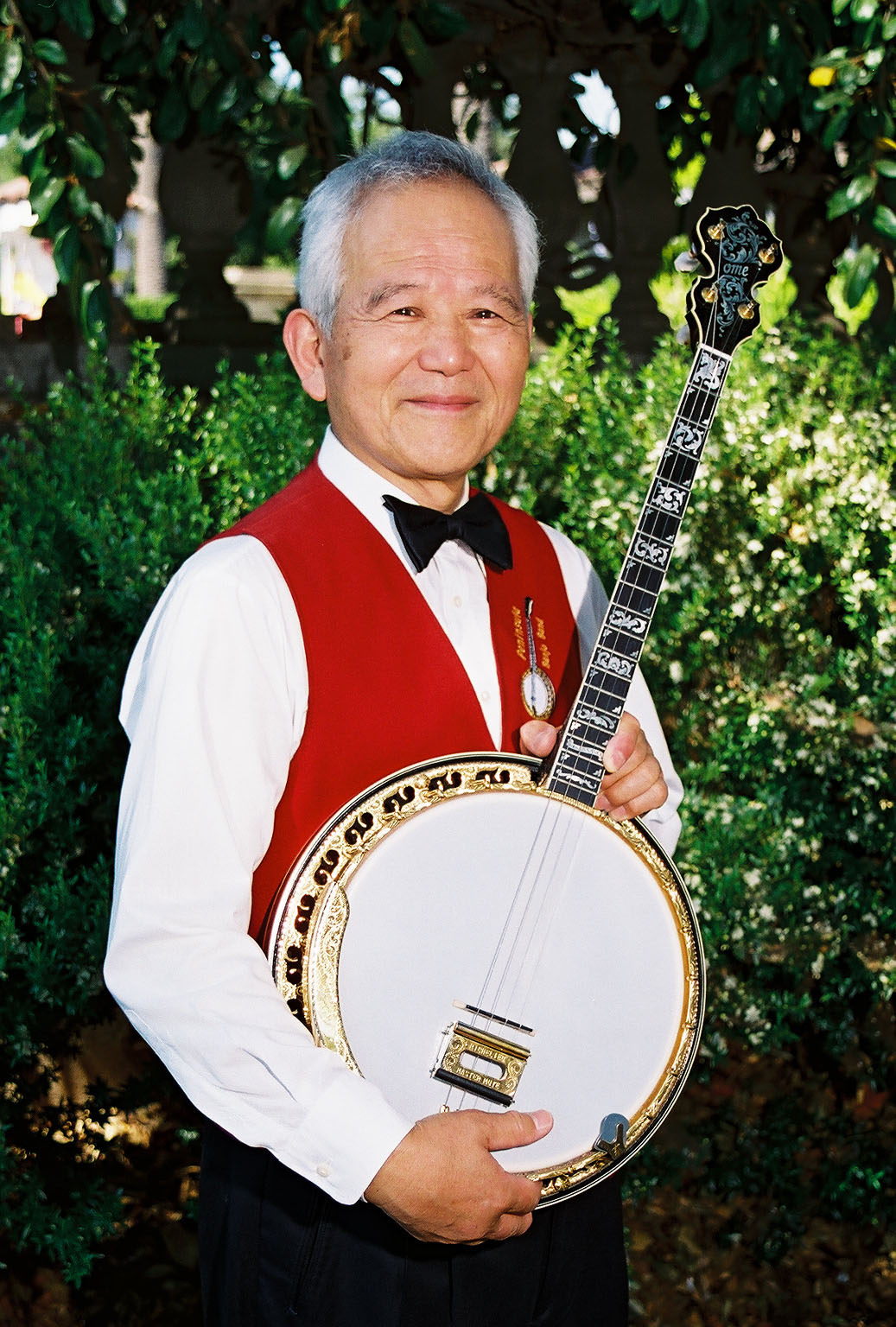
- Charlie Tagawa, music director of the Peninsula Banjo Band

Background information
- Birth name: Zenzo Tagawa
- Born: 27 October 1935; Tokyo, Japan
- Died: 30 July 2017 (aged 81)
- Genres: Dixieland, ragtime
- Occupation: Musician
- Instrument: Banjo
- Years active: 1956–2017
- Website: www.peninsulabanjoband.com

Charlie Tagawa (October 27, 1935 – July 30, 2017) was a Japanese-born American musical entertainer and banjoist. In a music career spanning seven decades, he was regarded as one of the best contemporary four-string banjo players. He performed regularly across the U.S. and in Japan, where he was known professionally as "Japan's Harry Reser". A 2003 inductee into the National Four-String Banjo Hall of Fame, Tagawa often performed as the headline act at banjo jazz festivals and shows. He was also the international goodwill ambassador for the Peninsula Banjo Band.

Tagawa was a protégé of Reser's, who advised and encouraged him in the development of his single-string technique. In honour of his mentor, he regularly played Reser's original compositions, including "The Cat and the Dog", "Cracker Jack", and "Lolly Pops".

== Early career ==
Born in Tokyo, Japan, Tagawa was introduced to the banjo in 1956, when he was twenty-one, by Takashi Tsunoda, one of Japan's top banjoists and recording artists. Although he started on guitar, he found his calling after picking up a four-string tenor banjo. Shortly thereafter, he purchased a used tenor banjo for $20.00. After graduating from Senshu University with a degree in economics, he became a student of Tsunoda's. He was an apt student and quickly developed a style of his own. After three months of lessons and practicing, Tagawa became a professional banjoist.

Tagawa joined a country-western band in Tokyo and played lead banjo on a two-year tour. He then played as a soloist with the Dixieland Dukes for three years. Developing as a featured entertainer, he moved on to Tokyo's Gaslight Club, and his repertoire began to include standards from other nations.

== Performing at restaurants ==
In 1964, the owner of the Sakura Gardens restaurant in Mountain View, California was in Tokyo for the summer Olympics and caught Tagawa's act. He was so impressed by Tagawa's playing and stage presence that he offered him a contract to play at his restaurant in the U.S. After moving to the US, Tagawa adopted the Western name Charlie, and quickly established friendships with other four-string banjoists in the area. He performed at Sakura Gardens, and its successor restaurant Imperial Gardens, for fifteen years.

Tagawa developed a loyal following. On many evenings, his banjo- or washtub bass- ("gut bucket") playing friends would come by to listen and jam. Tagawa also performed at other venues, including a stint at San Francisco's Red Garter, a 1920s-themed nightclub with continuous entertainment.

== Cupertino Banjo Band ==
In 1966, Tagawa met local banjo teacher Chuck Ray, who invited him to join the Cupertino Banjo Band. Tagawa soon became the band's music director and continued to lead the band for all but one year. Under his leadership and reputation, the band grew at a steady pace. Its name was later changed to the Golden Gate Banjo Band; then, in 1971, it became known as the Peninsula Banjo Band (to acknowledge that its members traveled from as far as Santa Cruz and Burlingame).

Tagawa had hundreds of banjo students, with whom he used a modified form of the Suzuki method. Many of his students, including Bill Lowrey, Kevin McCabe and Scotty Plummer, went onto successful music careers.

== Junior Banjo Band ==
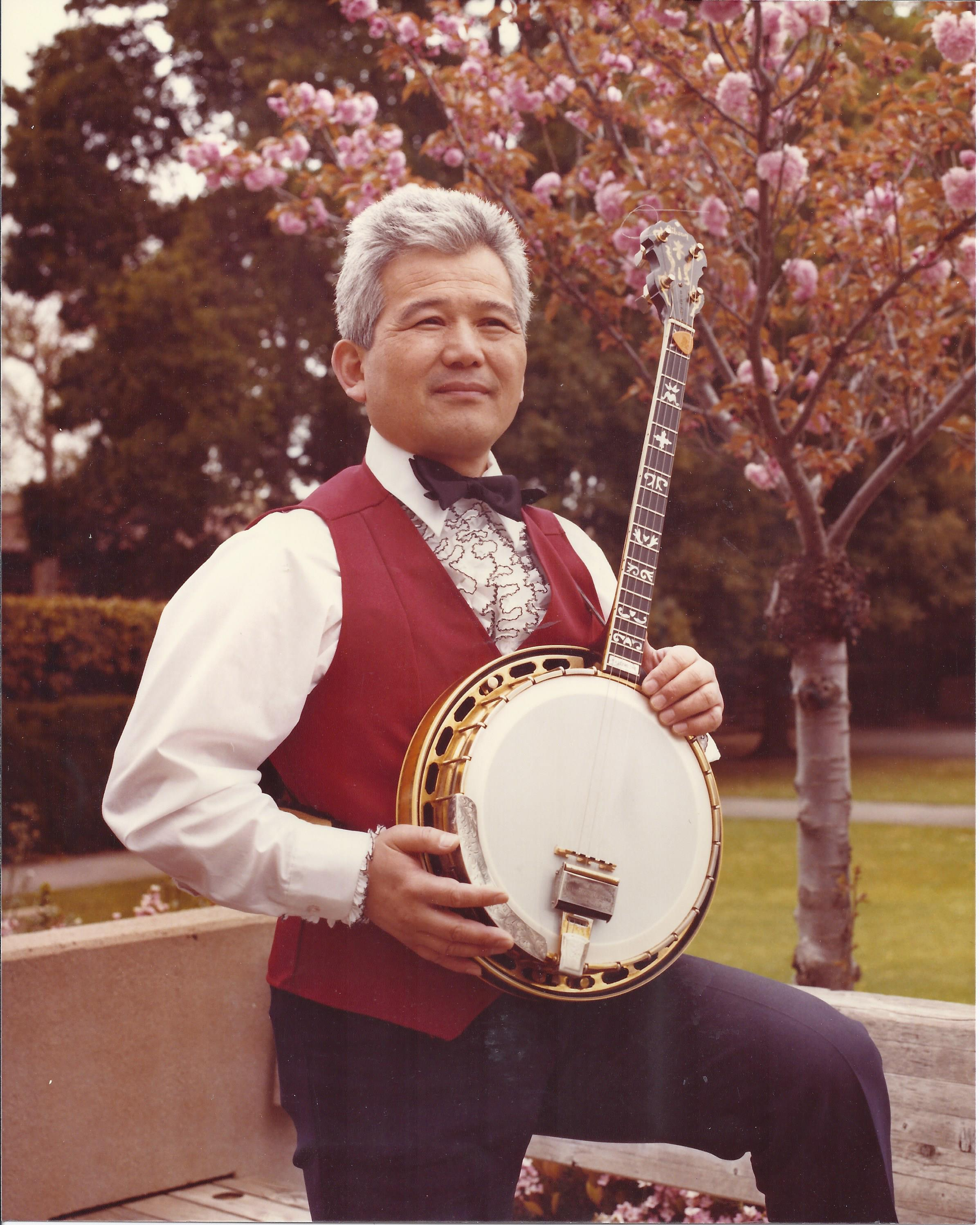
Charlie Tagawa in the 1980s

In the early '70s, several of Tagawa's younger students formed a band to extend their banjo skills. Ranging in age from six to sixteen, their instruments included banjo, guitar, piano, and washtub basses. Tagawa led the band through the mid-'80s. When they were eventually asked to perform in public, they chose to be called Charlie Tagawa's Junior Banjo Band.

The band performed on television shows, at venues such as Marriott's Great America, at county fairs, and at charitable organizations' functions and clubs. In 1975, they played at the Fretted Instrument Guild of America's annual convention in Atlanta, Georgia. Their greatest performance was at Tokyo's Banjo Jubilee festival. The band performed in public from 1972 until its last performance at the Peninsula Banjo Band's annual Banjo Jubilee in 1985.

In 1977, the band recorded their album The Stars & Stripes Are Forever. Several of the band's members became professional musicians, including Bill Lowrey, Kevin McCabe, Scott Hartford, Bruce Jolly, Pat Dutrow and Nori Tagawa.

== Peninsula Banjo Band ==
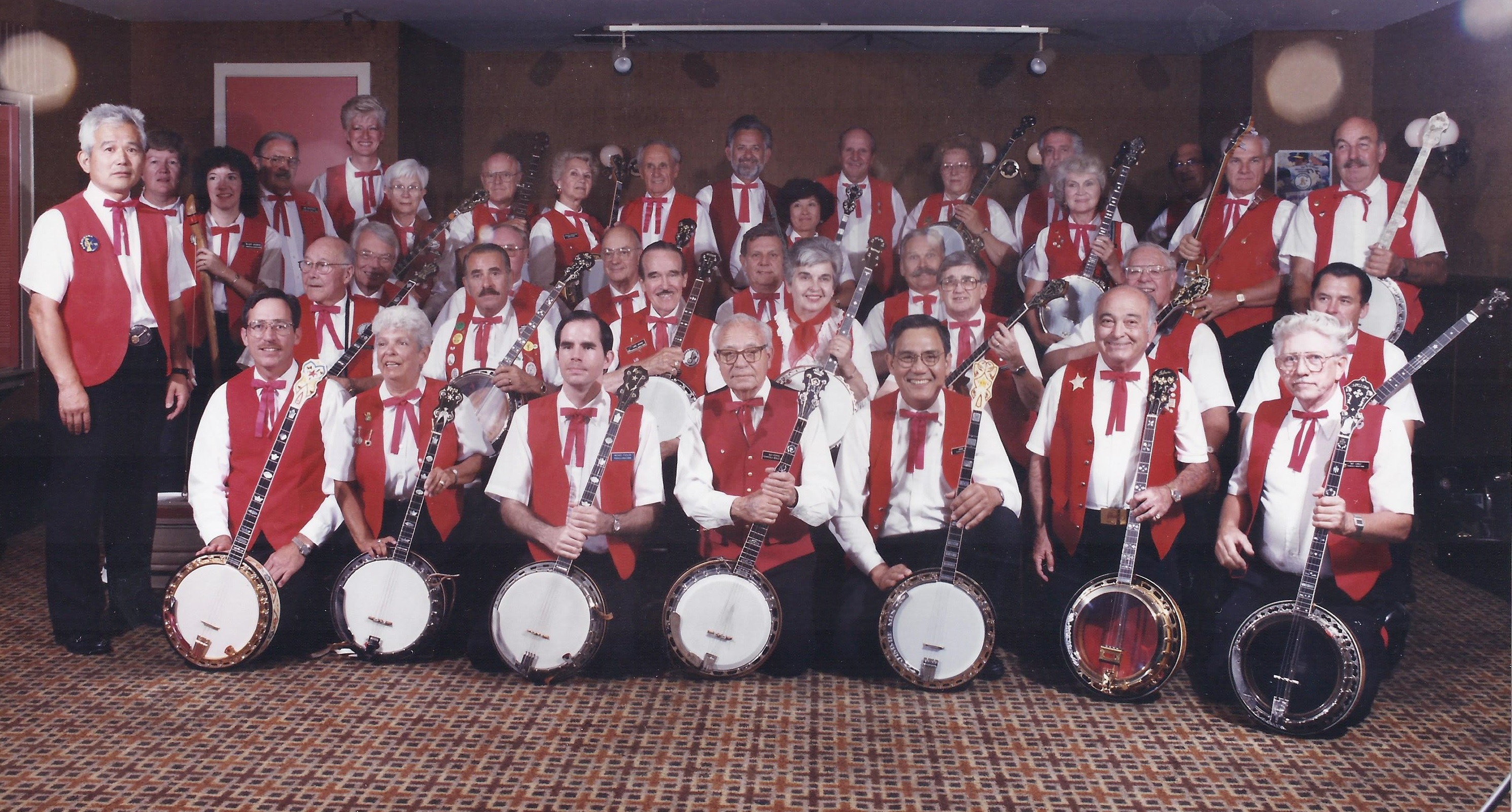
Peninsula Banjo Band in the 1990s

From 1975 on, the Peninsula Banjo Band recorded and produced four collections of performances:

- Just Because (on LP)
- More! More! More! (1981, on LP and audio cassette)
- Just One More Time (1996, on tape and CD)
- That Charlie Sound (2008), including 15 tracks by the band, as well as Tagawa in a combo with his sons Nori and Leon, and Bill Lowrey

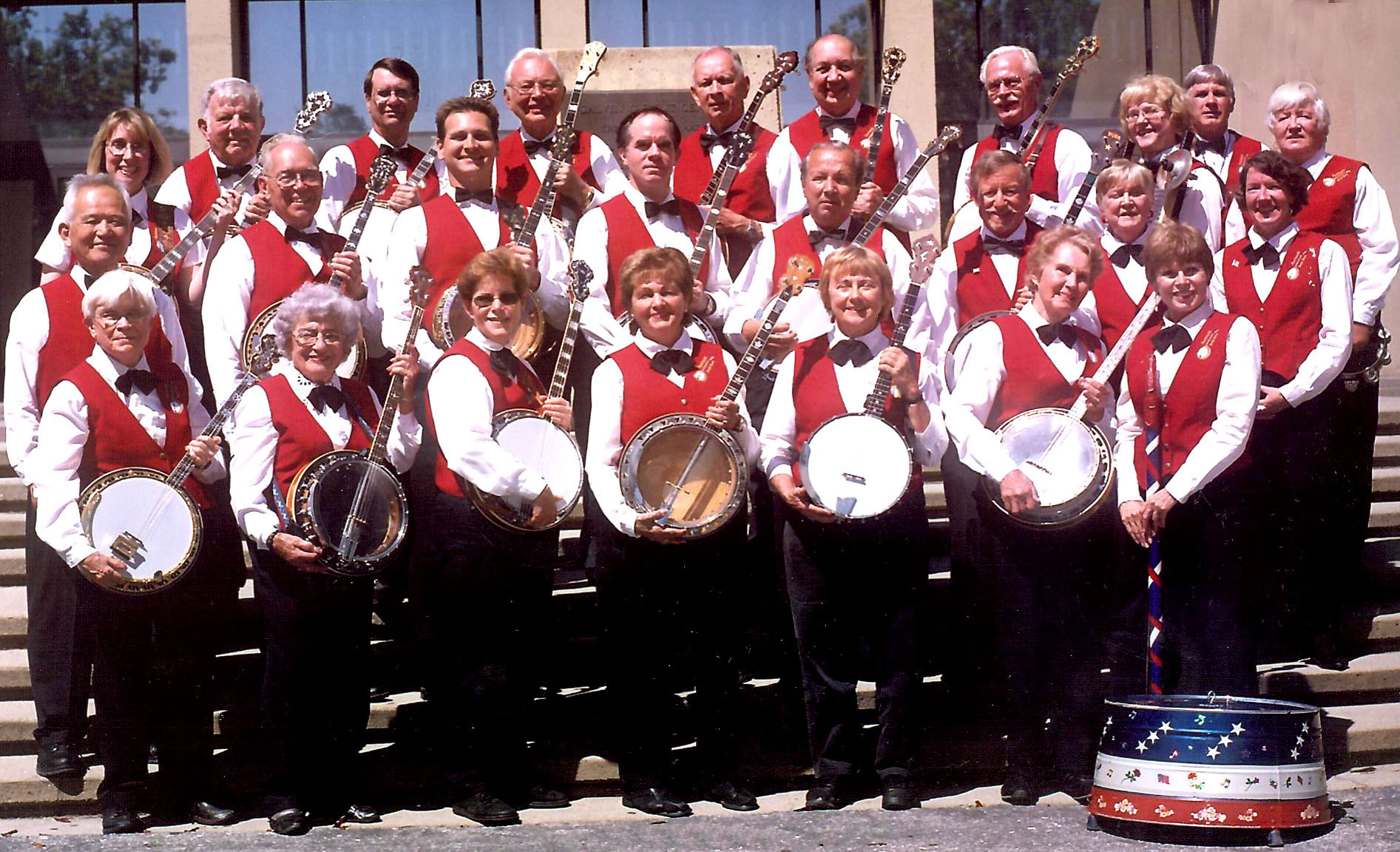
The Peninsula Banjo Band c. July 2003

== Awards and honors ==
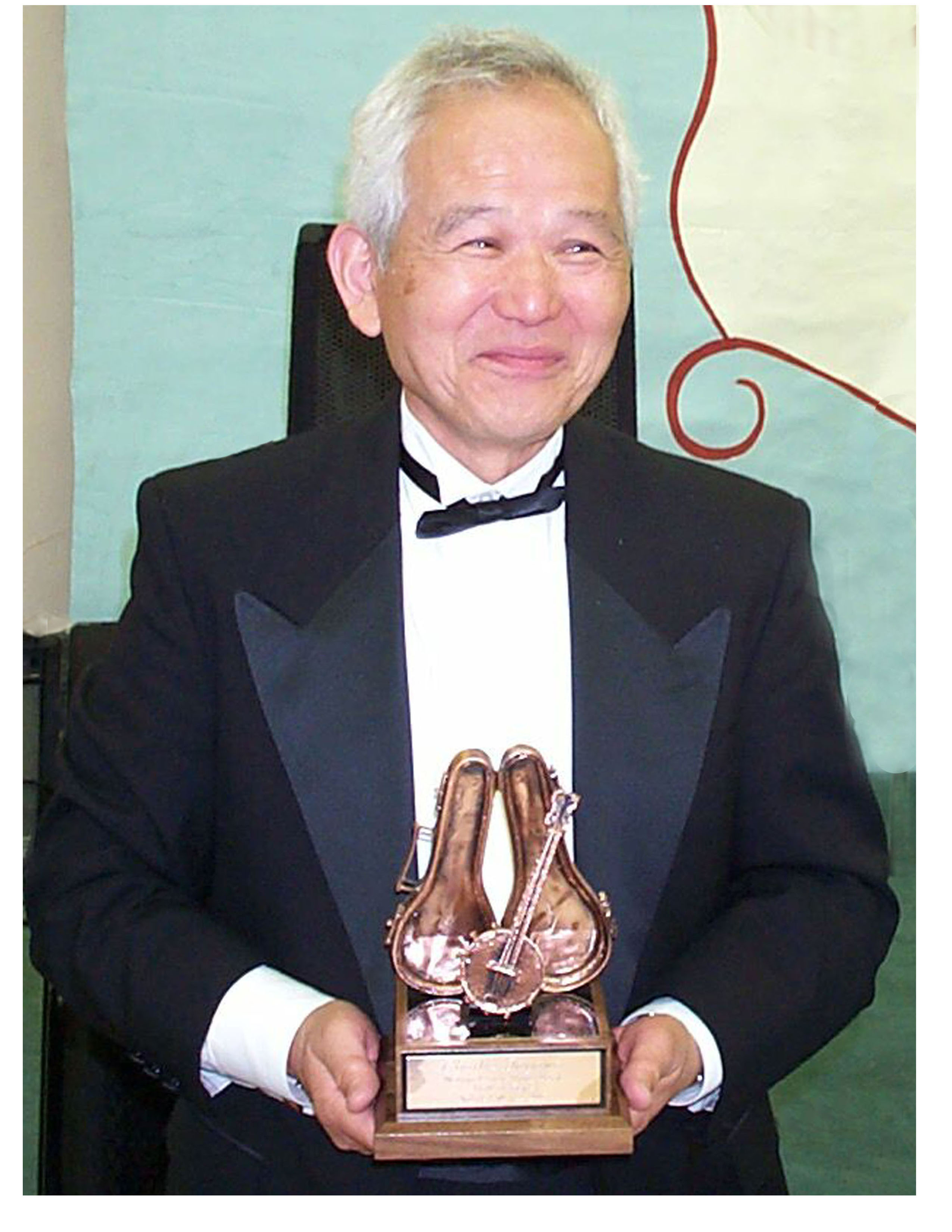
Tagawa at Banjo Hall of Fame induction, Guthrie, Oklahoma, 2003 (Joan Goldstein, photographer, from Peninsula Banjo Band archives)

In 1967, Tagawa was elected Best Banjo Player of the Year by the New Orleans Jazz Club of Northern California. George Barnes, writing in England's BMG magazine, said Tagawa was "one of that rare breed who is dedicated to play and teach the banjo as it should be played".

In 1978, Tagawa was invited to appear with Yoshio Toyama's Dixieland Saints, a band from Japan, at Stanford University. An LP of the session, Live "Stanford University", was released in May of that year.

Tagawa was the winner of FRETS magazine's Reader's Poll for "Best Banjoist - Tenor or Plectrum - All Styles" award in 1982 and 1983.

In September 2001, during the Peninsula Banjo Band's annual Banjo Jubilee, Tagawa was awarded the Lifetime Achievement Award by Banjos Unlimited, a nonprofit association dedicated to the preservation of the banjo and its music. He was further acknowledged as the 2001 Jubilee Honoree for his contributions to the Peninsula Banjo Band.

In May 2003, Tagawa was inducted into the Four String Banjo Hall of Fame at the American Banjo Museum in Guthrie, Oklahoma for his achievements in music education.

== Personal life ==
Tagawa was married to Masako Tagawa, a piano player and teacher, who died from cancer in the mid-1990s. They had two sons. Tagawa died on July 30, 2017.

== Discography ==
- Just Because (PBB, 1976)
- The Stars and Stripes Are Forever (1977)
- Dixieland Saints, Live Stanford University (Yoshio Toyama, 1978)
- More! More! More! (PBB, 1981)
- Just One More Time! (PBB, 1996)
- King of Banjo Players - Mr. Charlie Tagawa, His Friends at Minton House (JasRac, 2006)
- That Charlie Sound (Suspect Studios/Discmakers, 2008)

== See also ==
- List of banjo players
- Banjo Hall of Fame Members
- 4-string banjo
- Cupertino, California
- Japanese diaspora
