= Jimmy Mazzy =

American jazz musician

Jimmy Mazzy is a traditional jazz banjo player and vocalist.

According to jazz writer Scott Yanow, he "has been a popular attraction in the trad jazz circuit since the late '70s." He has performed extensively in the United States and worldwide, appearing at jazz festivals across the country including the Sacramento, San Diego, Essex, and several Connecticut festivals. He is a member of The Paramount Jazz Band and the Wolverine Jazz band and also freelances with other groups including the Yankee Rhythm Kings, the Magnolia Jazz Five, and the Back Bay Ramblers.

In 2002, he was voted the No. 1 traditional jazz banjoist, and No. 2 male singer in the Jazzology and Mississippi Rag readership polls. Mazzy has performed regularly with Jeff Hughes, John Clark, Stan McDonald, Ross Petot and many other traditional jazz musicians. In 2019, Jimmy Mazzy was inducted into the American Banjo Museum's Hall of Fame, in the category of 4 String Banjo Performance.

== See also ==
List of banjo players
