= Sherwood Johnson =

American jazz patron and restaurant owner

- Sherwood "Shakey" Johnson pictured on the cover of Shakey and Me
- Born: Sherwood Johnson; September 2, 1925; Sacramento, California, U.S.
- Died: October 31, 1998 (aged 73); Oregon House, California, U.S.
- Other names: Shakey
- Occupations: Businessman; entrepreneur; founder of Shakey's Pizza
- Years active: 1954-1966
- Known for: Founding Shakey's Pizza

Sherwood "Shakey" Johnson (September 2, 1925 – October 31, 1998) was an American businessman, entrepreneur, and the founder of Shakey's Pizza, a pizza restaurant chain. Shakey's Pizza currently operates in both the United States and the Philippines.

== Early history ==
Sherwood Johnson was born on September 2, 1925 in Sacramento, California, the son of a California deputy attorney general, and a graduate of Christian Brothers High School (Sacramento, California). In 1943, after graduating, Johnson joined the U.S. Navy and served two years in the Pacific theater aboard the USS Alnitah (AK-127). It was in the Navy that he got the nickname "Shakey." Johnson attended Sacramento City College, where he was known for a comedy act he performed with a fellow student. He also attended Hastings School of Law in San Francisco. In 1950, Johnson married Mary Jane Williams, whom he met at the American Legion Hall.

== Pizza business ==
In 1954, Johnson founded Shakey's Pizza with "Big Ed" Plummer. Johnson was responsible for every detail in the original Shakey's experience, including the food, drink, the clever signs on the walls and tabletops, and especially the music. Johnson hosted live music nightly at the original parlor and insisted that it be jazz-oriented, perhaps Dixieland or ragtime, or old-time. He was named "Emperor of Jazz" at the first Jazz Jubilee in Sacramento.

Johnson contracted polio around 1960 from a polio inoculation and walked with a slight limp from then on.

== Post business interests ==
Johnson sold out his interest in Shakey's Pizza to Colorado Milling and Elevator Co. in 1966 for $3 million. He retired to a ranch house he built on a 105-acre (0.42 km^{2}) estate in Oregon House, California and continued to be a patron of jazz and Dixieland music. He was inducted into the Banjo Hall of Fame in Guthrie, Oklahoma, for his use of banjo music in his pizza parlors.

Johnson died of a heart attack on October 31, 1998, at the age of 73.

== See also ==
- Banjo Hall of Fame Members
