= The Sunnysiders =

The Sunnysiders were an American pop music trio, who enjoyed brief success in the mid-1950s.

The group scored a hit with the song "Hey! Mr. Banjo", which reached No. 12 on the Billboard Hot 100 in 1955. The single's popularity prompted their label, Kapp Records, to issue a full-length album under the band's name; however, the group had only recorded three songs at the time, and so the 1955 LP Hey! Mr. Banjo is actually made up of tracks recorded by a group called The Happy Harts.

Among the group's members were banjoists Freddy Morgan (1910–1970), Jad Paul, and singer Margie Rayburn, who later scored a top ten hit of her own in the US. Roy McGinnis was also a member of the group, and died on November 2, 2008.

Morgan and Paul were members of Spike Jones and his City Slickers. Morgan, a rubber-faced comedian who had a featured role with the band in the film Fireman, Save My Child (1954), was also the co-composer of "Hey! Mr. Banjo" with Norman Malkin, another former group member.

== See also ==
- Banjo Hall of Fame Members

== Bibliography ==
- Young, Jordan R. (2005). Spike Jones Off the Record: The Man Who Murdered Music. (3rd edition) Albany: BearManor Media ISBN 1-59393-012-7.
