= Eddy Davis =

American musical artist (1940–2020)

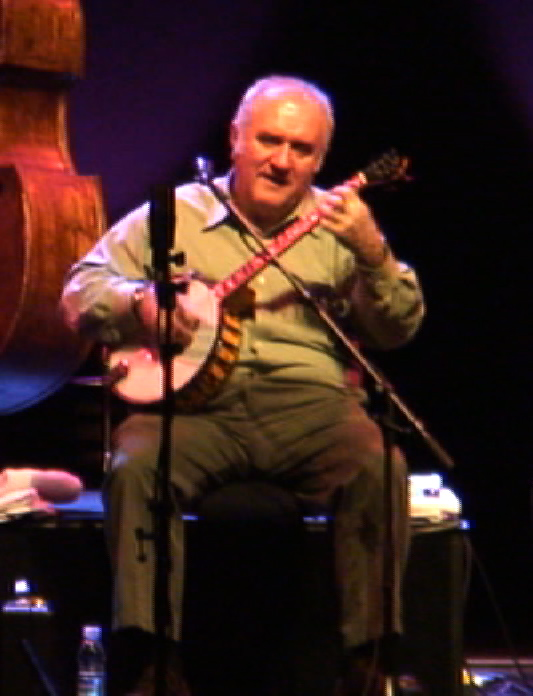
- Eddy Davis in Lisbon, 2006

Background information
- Birth name: Eddy Ray Davis
- Born: September 26, 1940; Lafayette, Indiana
- Died: April 7, 2020 (aged 79); New York City, New York
- Genres: Jazz
- Instrument: Banjo

Eddy Ray Davis (September 26, 1940 – April 7, 2020) was an American musician and bandleader of trad jazz, who was internationally known mainly through the decades of collaboration with the clarinetist and filmmaker Woody Allen.

== Life and work ==
Davis started playing banjo during his senior year in high school to play Dixieland with a college band called The Salty Dogs. The Purdue-based group played across the Midwestern United States and had pre-appearances of greats like The Four Freshmen and The Kingston Trio. He moved to Purdue for a year, then to Chicago. There, he became an integral part of the jazz scene at venues such as the "Gaslight Club" and Bourbon Street and often worked for variety or comedy acts, among others. with actor David Huddleston. He also appeared on a Dixieland revue in Disneyland and served as musical director for a tour resumption of the musical Whoopee! In 1966, he recorded his debut album "Live! At the Old Town Gate", with a group that from then on operated as "Eddy Davis Dixie Jazzmen". The next albums under the Davis name included "Whiz Bang" (1973), a satirical production with flute and tuba and "Plays and Sings Just For Fun" (1974, mainly devoted to Jelly Roll Morton).

Davis went to New York and received recognition from the jazz traditionalists there: he played drums in the earliest edition of Vince Giordano's "Nighthawks". In 1976, he performed in Germany with his European colleagues Herbert Christ, Jean-Pierre Mulot and René Franc in the "Hot Jazz Orchestra of Europe". In the American edition of this "Hot Jazz Orchestra" he played in 1979 with Max Kaminsky, Vince Giordano, Bobby Gordon and Dill Jones; In 1983, the clarinetist Jack Maheu and the pianist Don Ewell were part of "Eddy Davis and The Hot Jazz Orchestra". With "Stanley's Washboard Kings" around Stan King, Davis went on a Japanese tour in the same year. He also orchestrated and conducted a musical by Terry Waldo, with whose "Waldo's Gutbucket Syncopators", he recorded several albums.

When the conductor performed Maurice Peress Paul Whiteman's "Aeolian Hall Concert" from 1924 on its 60th anniversary, he hired Davis as a banjoist. At that time he performed regularly in the club Red Blazer Too in a trio with his banjo colleague Cynthia Sayer and the bassist Pete Compo. With Sayer, Davis also founded the "New York Banjo Ensemble", which recorded an album with compositions by George Gershwin in 1984 and an album with Rags in 2005.

Davis's connection with Woody Allen was established in Chicago in the 1960s when Davis was headlining a club on Rush Street and Allen was a comedian at that club, but also played in his band. Allen played in Eddy Davis's "New Orleans Jazz Band", with which Allen - otherwise known as a filmmaker - held the court as a clarinetist in New York for around 35 years. The band has played in the "Café Carlyle"' every Monday evening since 1997 (when it wasn't on an international tour); before that she had appeared in "Michael's Pub" every week since 1985. Davis also appeared on the soundtrack for Allen's film "Radio Days" "(1987) and appeared on "Sweet and Lowdown" as a band member. For his contribution to the soundtrack for "Midnight in Paris" he received a Grammy Award. The documentary Wild Man Blues records Allen's first tour with Davis's band. In the late 1990s and early 2000s, Davis was also heard every week in the restaurant called "The Cajun" on Eighth Avenue in Chelsea. In the band he led there, Scott Robinson played on C melody saxophone. In addition, other recordings such as The Bunk Project (1993) or Just Sittin 'Here Strummin' This Ole Banjo (2005) were created.

He was involved in 73 recording sessions between 1957 and 2012, including: with Leon Redbone, Turk Murphy, Doc Cheatham and Frank Vignola.

Davis died from COVID-19 at Mount Sinai West Hospital in April 2020, during the COVID-19 pandemic in New York City. He was 79 years old.
