= Dudu, Jammu and Kashmir =

Dudu
- Village
- Location in Jammu and Kashmir, India Dudu (India)
- Coordinates: 32.86°N 75.51°E
- Country: India
- Union Territory: Jammu and Kashmir
- District: Udhampur

Population (2011)
  - Total: 1,719

Languages
  - Spoken: Dogri, Hindi
- Time zone: UTC+5:30 (IST)
- PIN: 182128

Dudu is a village and municipality in Udhampur district of the Indian union territory of Jammu and Kashmir. The town is located 100 kilometres from the district headquarters Udhampur.

== Demographics ==
According to the 2011 census of India, Dudu village has 312 households. The literacy rate of Dudu village was 47.29% compared to 67.16% of Jammu and Kashmir. In Duggan, Male literacy stands at 62.87% while the female literacy rate was 30.42%.

Demographics (2011 Census)
	Total	Male	Female
Population	1719	893	826
Children aged below 6 years	336	174	162
Scheduled caste	918	467	451
Scheduled tribe	1	1	0
Literacy	47.29%	62.87%	30.42%
Workers (all)	594	432	162
Main workers (total)	436	–	–
Marginal workers (total)	158	16	142

== Transport ==
=== Road ===
Dudu is well-connected by road to other places in Jammu and Kashmir and India by Ramnagar Road and NH 44.

=== Rail ===
The nearest major railway stations to Dudu are Jammu Tawi railway station and Udhampur railway station located at a distance of 161 kilometres and 100 kilometres respectively.

=== Air ===
The nearest airport to Gundna is Jammu Airport located at a distance of 160 kilometres and is a 5-hour drive.

== See also ==
- Jammu and Kashmir
- Udhampur district
- Udhampur
