= Stan McDonald =

American jazz musician (1935–2021)

Stanley Montrose McDonald Jr. (August 28, 1935 – May 2021) was an American traditional jazz soprano saxophone and clarinetist. He was one of the founding members of the New Black Eagle Jazz Band in 1971. Ten years later he founded the Blue Horizon Jazz Band.

McDonald made numerous recordings with the New Black Eagles.

McDonald was listed as one of the top five soprano saxophone players in the world in a 1985 Mississippi Rag poll. He has played with Ralph Sutton, Tommy Benford, Buzzy Drootin, Ross Petot, Sammy Price, Benny Waters, Doc Cheatham, Dick Wetmore, Marty Grosz, and Scott Hamilton.

In 2010, McDonald was the subject of a three-part series entitled Visiting Stan McDonald on Dave Radlauer's Jazz Rhythm radio series. The program won a Gabriel Award in 2011.

Stan McDonald died in May 2021, at the age of 85.

== Discography ==
with Blue Horizon Jazz Band:

- A Real Love Strong
- I Remember When
- Innside Track
- Dawn of the Blue Horizon Jazz Band
- Banned in Boston
- Classic Jazz Variations

== Sources ==
- The Mississippi Rag, by George A. Borgman, February 2003, pages 1–9.
