= Jack Chernos =

American singer-songwriter

Jack Chernos (born 1961) is a San Francisco-based activist singer/songwriter. In the tradition of Woody Guthrie, Pete Seeger and Bob Dylan, Chernos plays his rousing, inspirational songs for social justice at rallies, pickets, and protests across the country and around the world. He performs on five-string banjo in the "old-timey" clawhammer style, as opposed to the three-finger Scruggs style developed by Earl Scruggs.

Chernos has written several political songs of historical significance, including:

- "Sold Down the River", the song played in continuous-loop from the billboard truck of the United Steel Workers of America during the World Trade Organization protests in Seattle in late 1999;
- "My People Are Rising", which was also written for the WTO protests;
- "The Union Grand", which was the theme song of the Million Worker March on Washington, D.C. in October 2004, where it was performed as a sing-along at the Lincoln Memorial; and
- "The Silence of Good People", which was inducted into the National Civil Rights Museum in Memphis, Tennessee.
