= Dudu (footballer, born 2005) =

Brazilian footballer (born 2005)

Personal information
- Full name: Eduardo Vinícius Rodrigues dos Santos
- Date of birth: 10 August 2005 (age 21)
- Place of birth: Brazil
- Height: 1.82 m (6 ft 0 in)
- Position: Midfielder

Team information
- Current team: Cuiabá
- Number: 15

Youth career
- 2019–2020: Sport Recife
- 2021: Palmeira
- 2022: Retrô
- 2023: Falcon
- 2023–: Cuiabá

Senior career*
Years	Team	Apps	(Gls)
2021	Palmeira	6	(0)
2023	América-SE	5	(1)
2023–	Cuiabá	1	(0)
- * Club domestic league appearances and goals as of 06:19, 7 December 2024 (UTC)

Eduardo Vinícius Rodrigues dos Santos (born 2 April 2005), known as Dudu or Eduardo Vinícius, is a Brazilian professional footballer who plays as a midfielder for Cuiabá.

== Career ==
Dudu played for Sport Recife as a youth before making his senior debut with Palmeira in the 2021 Campeonato Potiguar. He subsequently returned to youth football with Retrô in the following year, before signing for América-SE ahead of the 2023 season.

In 2023, after a short period at Falcon, Dudu joined Cuiabá's under-20 side. In July 2024, he started training with the main squad under head coach Petit.

Dudu made his first team – and Série A – debut for Dourado on 5 December 2024, coming on as a late substitute for Denilson in a 1–0 away loss to Fluminense, as his club was already relegated.

== Career statistics ==
As of 7 December 2024.

Appearances and goals by club, season and competition
Club	Season	League			State League		Cup		Continental		Other		Total	
Club	Season	Division	Apps	Goals	Apps	Goals	Apps	Goals	Apps	Goals	Apps	Goals	Apps	Goals
Palmeira	2021	Potiguar	—		6	0	—		—		—		6	0
América-SE	2023	Sergipano	—		5	1	—		—		—		5	1
Cuiabá	2024	Série A	1	0	0	0	0	0	0	0	4 (Note: Appearance(s) in Copa FMF)	0	5	0
Career total			1	0	11	1	0	0	0	0	4	0	16	1

== Honours ==
Cuiabá

- Campeonato Mato-Grossense: 2024
