= Dudu Mineiro =

Brazilian footballer (born 1985)

Personal information
- Full name: Adalton Luis Juvenal
- Date of birth: 30 June 1985 (age 41)
- Place of birth: Conselheiro Lafaiete, Brazil
- Height: 1.83 m (6 ft 0 in)
- Position: Striker

Senior career*
Years	Team	Apps	(Gls)
2004–2005	Batatais FC	?	(?)
2005–2007	Clube do Remo	?	(?)
2008	Guará	?	(?)
2008–2009	Chernomorets Burgas	44	(11)
2010–2012	FC Thun	14	(2)
2010	→ Yverdon-Sport (loan)	4	(0)
2011	→ Yangon United (loan)	?	(?)
2012	São Carlos	8	(1)
2013	Votuporanguense	8	(2)
- * Club domestic league appearances and goals as of 17:12, 4 April 2012 (UTC)

Adalton Luis Juvenal or simply Dudu or Dudu Mineiro (born 30 June 1985) is a Brazilian footballer currently playing for Brazilian side Votuporanguense as a forward.

Dudu appeared in the Copa do Brasil for Guará. He played for Brazilian club Clube do Remo before he was bought by Chernomorets Burgas in 2008.
