= Kruger Brothers =

US bluegrass group

The Kruger Brothers
- The Kruger Brothers at MerleFest, Wilkesboro, April 2014

Background information
- Genres: Folk; Bluegrass
- Years active: 1995–present
- Members: Jens Kruger; Uwe Kruger; Joel Landsberg

The Kruger Brothers is a trio of musicians who play bluegrass and new American folk music. The trio consists of Jens Kruger (banjo, harmony vocals), Uwe Kruger (guitar, lead and harmony vocals) and Joel Landsberg (bass, harmony vocals).

== Career Details ==
Originally from Switzerland, where the trio first formed, Jens Krüger (18 Nov 1962) and Uwe Krüger (24 Apr 1961) later moved to Wilkes County, NC. The brothers began playing North American folk music at an early age and were particularly inspired by recordings of Doc Watson, Flatt and Scruggs, Bill Monroe, and other progenitors of country, bluegrass and folk music. Their first public performances were as a duo, busking on the streets of cities throughout eastern and western Europe. Later, after gaining a recording contract as well as a radio show on SRG SSR, the Swiss public broadcaster, they teamed up with bass player Joel Landsberg (27 Jul 1959), inaugurating a trio that has been playing professionally together since 1995. Landsberg is an American citizen from New York, NY. The first recording project to include Landsberg was Behind the Barn, Vol. 2, which was released in 1997.

Today the group has gained the attention of some of the musicians, including Bill Monroe, Doc Watson, Tut Taylor, and Bobby Hicks, that once served as models. Watson once remarked that, "The Kruger Brothers are just about as fine a band as I’ve ever played with. … I love to play music with them.”

== Music and Recordings ==
Happy Traum has described Jens Kruger as "one of the world's most musically sophisticated and technically accomplished five-string banjo players." The recording that cemented the Kruger Brothers' sound and song writing, Up 18 North, was released in 2002 on the Double Time Inc. label. Most recently their music has ventured further into the themes and forms of classical music, as in their 2011 release, Appalachian Concerto. The Kruger Brothers appear occasionally on others' recording projects, including Norman Blake, Nancy Blake, Tut Taylor's Shacktown Road (2007), and Steve Spurgin's Past Perfect (2011).

== Distinctions and awards ==
Jens Kruger playing the banjo

- In 2021, Jens Kruger was inducted into the American Banjo Museum Hall of Fame in the 5-String Performance category.
- On September 27, 2013, the Kruger Brothers appeared on the Late Show with David Letterman. They performed their instrumental piece "Jack of the Wood" with the Kontras Quartet and Steve Martin, who played clawhammer banjo. After the performance, Jens was awarded a statuette commemorating his receipt of the Steve Martin Prize for Excellence in Banjo and Bluegrass Music.
- In 2011 Jens Kruger was cited for induction into the Blue Ridge Music Hall of Fame in the category of Regional Musician.
- In 2007 the Bangor Symphony Orchestra and the Kruger Brothers received an award for Artistic Excellence from the National Endowment for the Arts. The award was granted in support of the production of Jens Kruger's Music From the Spring.

== Discography ==
- Carolina Roots with the Keiser Twins (2021)
- Roan Mountain Suite (2017)
- Lucid Dreamer (2015)
- Spirit of the Rockies (2014)
- Remembering Doc Watson (2013)
- Best of the Kruger Brothers (2012)
- Appalachian Concerto (2011)
- Christmas Magic (2010)
- Forever and a Day (2010)
- Between the Notes (2009)
- The Suite (2007)
- Carolina Scrapbook: Gospel Edition (2006)
- Carolina Scrapbook Vol. 2 (2006)
- Choices (2004)
- Up 18 North (2002)
- Carolina Scrapbook (1999)
- Travel the Gravel (1998)
- Behind the Barn Vol. 2 (1997)
- Access all Areas (1996)
- Behind the Barn (1995)

== Video Recordings ==
- Wood in the Whisky (2018)
- Beautiful Nothing The Kruger Brothers (Documentary, 2015)
- Jens Kruger's Banjo Method for Beginners (2009)
- The Banjo Techniques of Jens Kruger - Developing Skills, Creativity and Musicianship (2006)
