= Chris Stephens (musician) =

American musician

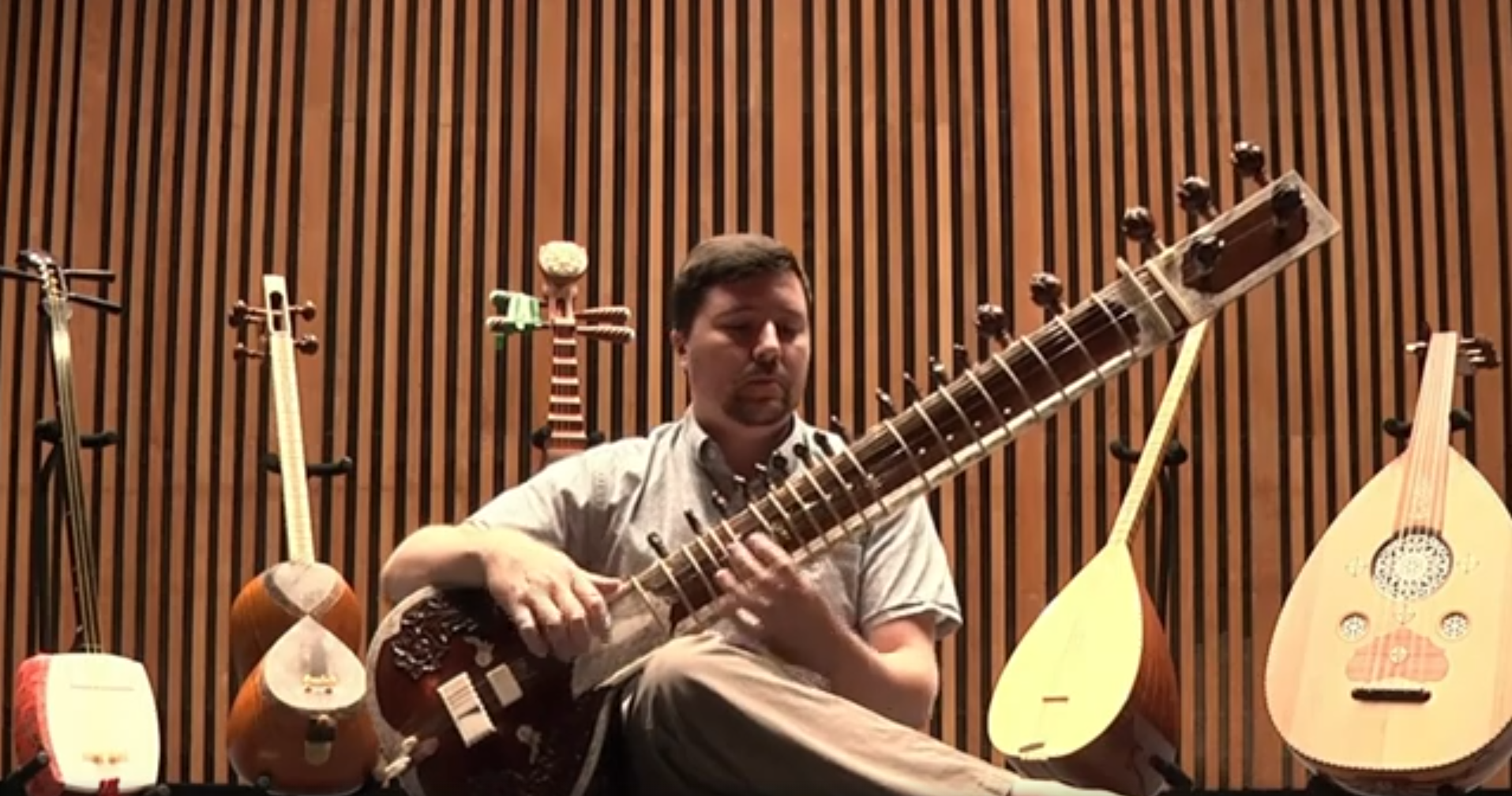
- Chris Stephens performing at MU School of Music, September 4, 2024

Background information
- Born: 11 May 1983 (age 42); Dexter, Missouri, US
- Genres: World music
- Occupation: Musician
- Years active: 2004 –

Chris Stephens (born May 11, 1983) is an American musician who specializes in lutes from the Silk Road (Middle East, Persia, India, and Asia) as well as guitar and banjo.

== Early life and education ==
Stephens studied anthropology and geography at the University of Missouri and Southeast Missouri State University. He started as a guitar player, belonging to the jam band scene of the late early 2000s which primed his interest in improvisation. After hearing Bela Fleck, he was inspired to take up learning eastern music. His curiosity led him to learn instruments such as the oud, sitar, pipa, shamisen, tar, baglama, as well as the banjo, which is central to American bluegrass music. He studied sitar under Imrat Khan.

== Career ==
Stephens is an active performer, teacher, and cultural ambassador through his educational programs, combining music with historical and geographical learning. He is renowned for his ability to perform on a wide range of instruments, including traditional instruments from Asia and the Middle East, as well as Western instruments. He has performed across the United States as a solo artist and in collaboration with other musicians and ensembles. His music draws from compositions across diverse regions and historical periods, showcasing his mastery of improvised musical traditions such as Maqam, Dastgah, and Raga.

He is the first American Pipa player to be hosted by the US China Music Institute at Bard College. A significant part of his career is the "Open Strings" program, designed as an educational platform for students of all ages. This program provides insight into global musical heritage through hands-on experiences with instruments and musical traditions, blending music with history, geography, and cultural studies. He teaches music lessons at Compass Music in Columbia, Missouri and online.
