= Joe Medford =

Joe Medford was born on April 2, 1932, and died on November 16, 1993. From Clyde, North Carolina, he was a well-known banjo player, playing with some of the early artists of bluegrass music. Groups and musicians he played with include the Murphy Brothers and the Blue River Boys, Mac Wiseman and Charlie Monroe & his Kentucky Partners.

== Recordings ==
A selection of the recordings on which Joe Medford played. Some of these are CD re-releases of old recordings in other formats:

- Early Bluegrass Recordings of the Murphy Brothers, Cattle Records
- Original Blue River Boys, Cattle Records
- I'm Old Kentucky Bound, Charlie Monroe, Bear Family Records, 2007
- Dim Lights, Thick Smoke and Hillbilly Music - Country & Western Hit Parade 1951, various artists, 2009
- Raw Fiddle, various artists, 2004
- 'Tis Sweet to Be Remembered: Complete Recordings 1951-1964, Mac Wiseman, 2003
- First Generation Blue Grass, Various Artists, 2002
