= Jad Paul =

- Born: June 16, 1916; Los Angeles, California, U.S.
- Died: December 29, 2008 (aged 92) Van Nuys, California, U.S.
- Genres: Country, traditional pop
- Occupation: Musician
- Label: RCA Victor
- Formerly of: The City Slickers

Jad Paul (June 16, 1916 – December 29, 2008) was an American musician, most noted for being one of the original members of Spike Jones' band "The City Slickers". He was also noted for his banjo playing.

== Career ==
Paul began playing the banjo at an early age. He used this skill of playing the banjo came in handy when he began playing for Spike Jones' band "The City Slickers" beginning in 1954.

In the early 1950s, he performed with Freddy Morgan on recordings credited to The Banjo Maniacs, The Happy Harts and The Sunnysiders (including the popular "Hey, Mr. Banjo"). Paul stayed with the City Slickers group through 1958.

After leaving Jones, he performed for local Los Angeles television station KTLA, on the weekly program Polka Parade, which included fellow prior "Slickers" members Bernie Jones and Joe "Country" Washburn. Jad also made three LP records for Liberty Records, when stereo was a new development, featuring his multi-tracking of the banjo.

Jad Paul could also play guitar and recorded at least one 10" 78 rpm record for the Northern California based Trilon label during the late 1940s. The orchestration (billed as The Jad Paul Trio) was a Piano-Bass-Guitar outfit like the King Cole Trio. The sides were "Honeysuckle Rose" and "I'm a Dreamer, Aren't We All." One unusual trait of Honeysuckle Rose was Paul playing the guitar and scatting in unison in a manner similar to George Benson at least a couple decades later.Bassist Slam Stewart had already done something similar with scatting with bowed bass fiddle about a decade earlier.

== Honors ==
Paul was inducted into the National Four-String Banjo Hall of Fame in 2008.
