= Doug Mattocks =

English cricketer (1944–1999)

Personal information
- Full name: Douglas Eric Mattocks
- Born: 5 July 1944; Norwich, Norfolk, England
- Died: 7 October 1999 (aged 55); Norwich, Norfolk, England
- Batting: Right-handed
- Role: Wicket-keeper

Domestic team information
- Years: Team
- 1985: Minor Counties
- 1961–1991: Norfolk

Career statistics
Competition	First-class	List A
Matches	1	7
Runs scored	1	7
Batting average	–	1.16
100s/50s	–/–	–/–
Top score	1*	2*
Balls bowled	–	–
Wickets	–	–
Bowling average	–	–
5 wickets in innings	–	–
10 wickets in match	–	–
Best bowling	–	–
Catches/stumpings	4/–	5/–
- Source: Cricinfo, 29 June 2011

Douglas Eric Mattocks (5 July 1944 – 7 October 1999) was an English cricketer. Mattocks was a right-handed batsman who fielded as a wicket-keeper. He was born in Norwich, Norfolk.

Mattocks made his debut for Norfolk in the 1961 Minor Counties Championship against Staffordshire. He played Minor counties cricket for Norfolk from 1961 to 1991, which included 206 Minor Counties Championship appearances and 22 MCCA Knockout Trophy matches. He made his List A debut for Norfolk against Yorkshire in the 1969 Gillette Cup. He made 6 further List A appearances for the county, the last of which came against Gloucestershire in the 1991 NatWest Trophy. A specialist wicket-keeper, Mattocks scored just 7 runs in his 7 List A matches at an average of 1.16, with a high score of 2 not out. Behind the stumps he took 5 catches.

Mattocks made a single first-class appearance during his career, which came for the Minor Counties against the touring Zimbabweans. He batted once in this match, scoring an unbeaten single in the Minor Counties first-innings, while behind the stumps he took 4 catches.

He died in the town of his birth on 7 October 1999.
