= Maurice Bolyer =

- Birth name: Maurice Beaulieu
- Born: December 1, 1920; Edmundston, New Brunswick, Canada
- Died: August 18, 1978 (aged 57)
- Genres: Country
- Instrument(s): Banjo, piano
- Years active: 1940–1978

Maurice Bolyer (December 1, 1920 – August 18, 1978), born Maurice Beaulieu, was a composer and musician known as "Canada's King of the Banjo". Although proficient in a variety of string instruments and piano, he is best known for his work on the banjo.

== Early life ==
Bolyer was born in Edmundston, New Brunswick, Canada, into a French-speaking family. He learned to play the piano as a young boy; after learning to play fiddle, guitar and mandolin, he began playing banjo in his late teens.

== Career ==
Beginning in the 1940s, Bolyer appeared regularly on Canadian radio stations CKCW (Moncton, New Brunswick) and CKNX (Wingham, Ontario). Boyler joined the CBC Radio program The Tommy Hunter Show in 1963, continuing with the show when it moved to television in 1965. Bolyer also appeared as a guest on the Lawrence Welk and Arthur Godfrey shows in the United States.

In 1975 Bolyer signed with RCA Canada.

Bolyer was inducted posthumously into the Canadian Country Music Hall of Fame in 1989.

== See also ==
- Banjo Hall of Fame Members
