= Dudu do Banjo =

Brazilian banjoist and guitarist

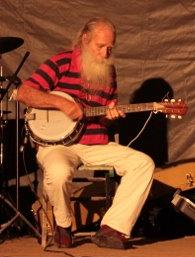
Photo of Dudu do Banjo broadcast on Radio Campeche

Francisco Eduardo de Souza Pereira or Dudu (born 4 June 1935, in São Paulo) is a Brazilian banjoist and guitar player known as "the king of banjo".

Dudu's artistic career started in São Paulo in the 1950s with the Paulistânia Jazz Band, in which he played banjo with saxophonist Booker Pittman and other musicians of different nationalities. After participating in other bands and achieving renown as a traditional jazz banjo player, Dudu joined the novelty that was rock'n'roll, creating The Avalons in 1957. The band released many successful singles, including "China Rock", cited as having the first instrumental rock guitar riff of Brazil.

In 1960 Dudu created the jam sessions of Folha de S.Paulo. In 1962 Dudu went to Europe, beginning in Paris where he joined the drummer Ney Banda de Castro with Brazilian Batucada, making several seasons in the venue La Grande Séverine. Dudu has made several European tours with singer Miúcha. In Greece, Dudu stayed for three years for presentations in Mykonos and Athens. Upon returning to Brazil, Dudu joined the Traditional Jazz Band, with which he toured various cities in the United States, participating in 1975's New Orleans Jazz & Heritage Festival. In the late 1990s, he founded the band Família Papadú with his sons Emanuel and Icaro. As of 2012, Dudu lives and works in Florianópolis with the Família Papadú.

== Discography ==
- The Avalons – China Rock (Dudu) e Valentina My Valentina (versão) Young Y-45-100 (ed.Fermata) 1959.
- The Avalons – Rebel Rouser e All the Time (Versões) Young Y-45-104 (ed. Fermata) 1959.
- The Avalons –Here Come The Avalons (Dudu) Young Y-45-112 1960.
- The Avalons –The Eyes of Texas are upon you (versão) N° 13 (Dudu) RGE 1961.
- The Avalons – Baby Talk Young Y-EP 1 - 1960.
- Regiane e The Avalons - The Beautiful Teenager Young Y-EP 2 1960.
- The Avalons – Juventude! RGE EP 90089 1961.
- Jam Session Booker Pitman & Dick Farney 1961 . LP Folha de S.Paulo 1961.
- Traditional Jazz Band - A era de ouro do Dixieland - LP Fontana 6470553 1975.
- PAPADÚ em Improviso - CD Independente 2001.
- PAPADÚ, o Cerne do Som - CD Independente 2011
