= Cynthia Sayer =

American jazz banjoist and singer

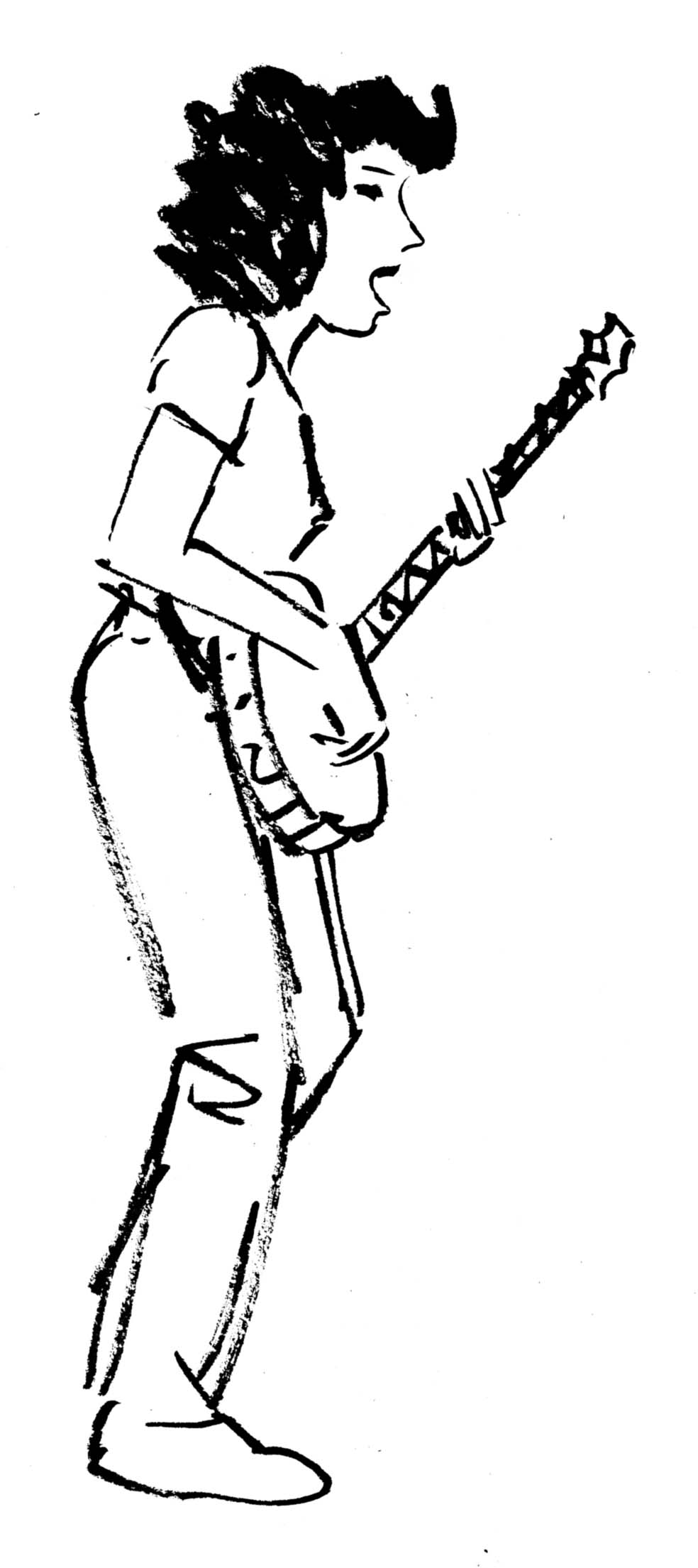
- Sketch at Jazz in Marciac festival, France

Background information
- Born: Cynthia Nan Sayer; May 20, 1962 (age 63); Waltham, Massachusetts, U.S.
- Genres: Jazz
- Occupations: Musician, singer
- Instruments: Banjo, vocals
- Years active: 1979–present
- Labels: Jazzology
- Website: www.cynthiasayer.com

Cynthia Nan Sayer (born May 20, 1962) is an American jazz banjoist, singer and a founding member of Woody Allen's New Orleans Jazz Band.

== Career ==
A native of Waltham, Massachusetts, Sayer spent her early childhood in Wayland, Massachusetts and the remainder of her youth in Scotch Plains, New Jersey. She played piano from the age of six through her college years and also studied viola, drums, guitar, and banjo. She graduated from Scotch Plains-Fanwood High School and was inducted into the school's hall of fame in 2016. She sang in school and community theater and graduated Magna Cum Laude from Ithaca College with a degree in English. Sayer has worked with Woody Allen, Milt Hinton, Dick Hyman, Bucky Pizzarelli, George Segal, Dick Wellstood, the New York Philharmonic, and The Metropolitan Opera Orchestra.

== Teaching ==
Along with her performing, Cynthia has been a music educator for over 30 years. She has self-published two educational books for traditional jazz, teaches private and group lessons, and is a rotating faculty member of the New York Hot Jazz Camp.

== Award and honors ==
- National Four-String Banjo Hall of Fame, 2006
- Steve Martin Banjo Prize, 2023

== Discography ==
- The Jazz Banjo of Cynthia Sayer Vol. 1 (New York Jazz, 1987)
- More Jazz Banjo Vol. 2 (New York Jazz, 1989)
- Forward Moves (Yerba Buena, 1992)
- Jazz at Home (Jazzology, 1997)
- String Swing (Jazzology, 2000)
- Souvenirs (Plunk, 2002)
- Attractions with Bucky Pizzarelli (Plunk, 2007)
- Joyride (Plunk, 2013)

With the New York Banjo Ensemble

- Plays Gershwin (Kicking Mule, 1982)

=== As guest ===
- Woody Allen, Wild Man Blues (RCA Victor, 1998)
- Peter Ecklund, Strings Attached (Arbors, 1996)
- Tony Trischka, World Turning (Rounder, 1995)
- Terry Waldo, Let It Shine (Stomp Off, 2003)

== Books ==
- You're IN The Band' (Cynthia Sayer Music, 2016)
- The Swinging Solos Of Elmer Snowden' (Cynthia Sayer Music, 2021)

== See also ==
- Banjo Hall of Fame Members
- List of banjo players

== Sources ==
- The Mississippi Rag, "Cynthia Sayer, Banjoist from the Big Apple", by George A. Borgman, June 1994.
