= Dudu, Hormozgan =

Dudu دودو
- Village
- Location within Iran
- Coordinates: 27°06′15″N 57°02′20″E
- Country: Iran
- Province: Hormozgan
- County: Minab
- Bakhsh: Central
- Rural District: Band-e Zarak

Population (2006)
  - Total: 513
- Time zone: UTC+3:30 (IRST)
  - Summer (DST): UTC+4:30 (IRDT)

Dudu (Persian: دودو, also Romanized as Dūdū, Dodoo, and Dūdow) is a village in Band-e Zarak Rural District, in the Central District of Minab County, Hormozgan Province, Iran. At the 2006 census, its population was 513, in 95 families.
