= Scotty Plummer =

American banjoist

Scotty Plummer (born circa 1961 – died 1992) was a highly regarded banjo player who made a name for himself as a youngster in both the United States and Canada and earned the title "Prince of Banjo". He also achieved some international fame through touring as a headline act with Liberace in the mid-1970s. Scotty used to attend school at Jameson Hall in San Rafael, CA. The school had an all asphalt playground and on rainy days, Scotty would play his banjo from classroom to classroom to entertain weather trapped students.

Plummer played what is termed the plectrum style of banjo playing and used, amongst other instruments, a Vega Vox 4 plectrum banjo as well as a Jerry Reilly Bicentennial Electronic (manufactured around 1976), which used as its base a 1927 Gibson Mastertone rim. He played this particular instrument, which was heavily ornamented in the casework and glowed beautifully under lights, for some of the shows he did with Liberace. Another source also suggests that he played in the Eddie Peabody style.

He also toured with country singer Eddy Arnold and was also often a guest on TV specials, particularly the 1975 Disney production Welcome to the World, starring Lucie Arnaz (when he was just 14 years old) and later in 1980, on Lucy Moves to NBC, starring Lucille Ball, Bob Hope, Gene Kelly, Donald O'Connor and a host of others.

Scotty Plummer was killed in a motorbike accident in the Bermudas in 1992, leaving behind his wife Denise and daughter Kylen.

He recorded an LP in 1974 released as Banjo on the Roof on the AVI label, also reissued on other labels.

Plummer was posthumously inducted into the National Four-String Banjo Hall of Fame.

== See also ==
- Banjo Hall of Fame Members
