= Clicquot (disambiguation) =

Clicquot may refer to:

Firms

- Veuve Clicquot, French champagne house
- Clicquot Club, nightclub in Atlantic City, New Jersey
- Clicquot Club Company, American soda company

People

- Madame Clicquot (1777–1866), eponymous owner of Veuve Clicquot champagne house
  - Widow Clicquot, 2024 film about Madame Clicquot
- Robert Clicquot (1645–1719), French organ builder
- François-Henri Clicquot (1732–90), French organ builder
- Claude-François Clicquot (1762–1801), French organ builder

Places

- Millis-Clicquot, Massachusetts, census-designated place in Millis, Norfolk County
- Cliquot, Missouri
