= The Clicquot Club Eskimos =

US radio program

The Clicquot Club Eskimos is a popular musical variety radio show, first heard in 1923, featuring a banjo orchestra directed by Harry Reser. A popular ginger ale, Clicquot Club, was Canada Dry's main rival. Clicquot (pronounced "klee-ko") was the name of the Eskimo boy mascot depicted in advertisements and on the product.

In the early 1920s, Reser's banjo performances on WEAF/New York were sometimes described by newspaper columnists as "sparkling," and this prompted WEAF production manager George Podeyn to approach the Clicquot company about sponsoring Reser's band. The policy of the U.S. Department of Commerce (which regulated radio broadcasting at that time), was that advertising on radio broadcasts was not allowed.

However, the Eskimo theme was carried through whenever possible. Band members wore Eskimo outfits when performing before a studio audience, and barking dogs were a component of Harry Reser's opening theme tune, Clicquot. Sheet music illustrations depicted the band performing in frigid far North settings.

The radio program aired on WEAF from 1923 to 1926, graduating in 1926 to the then brand-new NBC Radio Network, where it was heard as a half-hour show on Thursday at 10pm, then Thursday at 9pm (1927–28), Tuesday at 10pm (1928-30) and Fridays at 9pm (1930–33). A typical show opening went like this:

Announcer: Look out for the falling snow, for it’s all mixed up with a lot of ginger, sparkle, and pep, barking dogs and jingling bells, and there we have a crew of smiling Eskimos, none other than the Clicquot Club Eskimos tripping along to the tune of their own march—“Clicquot.”

Orchestra: (Plays “Clicquot,” the trademark overture.)

Announcer (Continuing): After the long breath-taking trip down from the North Pole, the Eskimos stop in front of a filling station for a little liquid refreshment—and what else would it be, but Clicquot Club Ginger Ale—the ginger ale that’s aged six months. Klee-ko is spelled C-L-I-C-Q-U-O-T. You’ll know it by the Eskimo on the bottle. (Slight pause.) Up in Eskimo-land where the cold wind has a whistle all its own and a banjo is an instrument of music, the Eskimos spell melody with a capital “M,” and tell us that “It Goes Like This.”

Orchestra: (Plays “It Goes Like This.”)

On January 23, 1933, it began on the Blue Network, Mondays at 8pm, continuing that year until July 24. After a two-year hiatus, the program resumed Saturdays at 8pm on CBS, where it was broadcast from December 21, 1935 until January 4, 1936, returning to NBC that year from January 12 to April 12, airing Sundays at 3pm.

Reser's band used different pseudonyms on recordings made for many different labels. Tom Stacks was the featured vocalist. The tuba player was Maurice Black (1891-1938).

== In popular culture ==
The Clicquot Club Eskimos are mentioned in the 1992 film A River Runs Through It when Norman unfavorably devalues them alongside American bandleader Paul Whiteman, preferring Louis Armstrong, "Colored Jazz," and Jessie, seemingly insulted, replies: "my mother loves the Clicquot Club Eskimos".
