= Millis, Massachusetts =

- Town
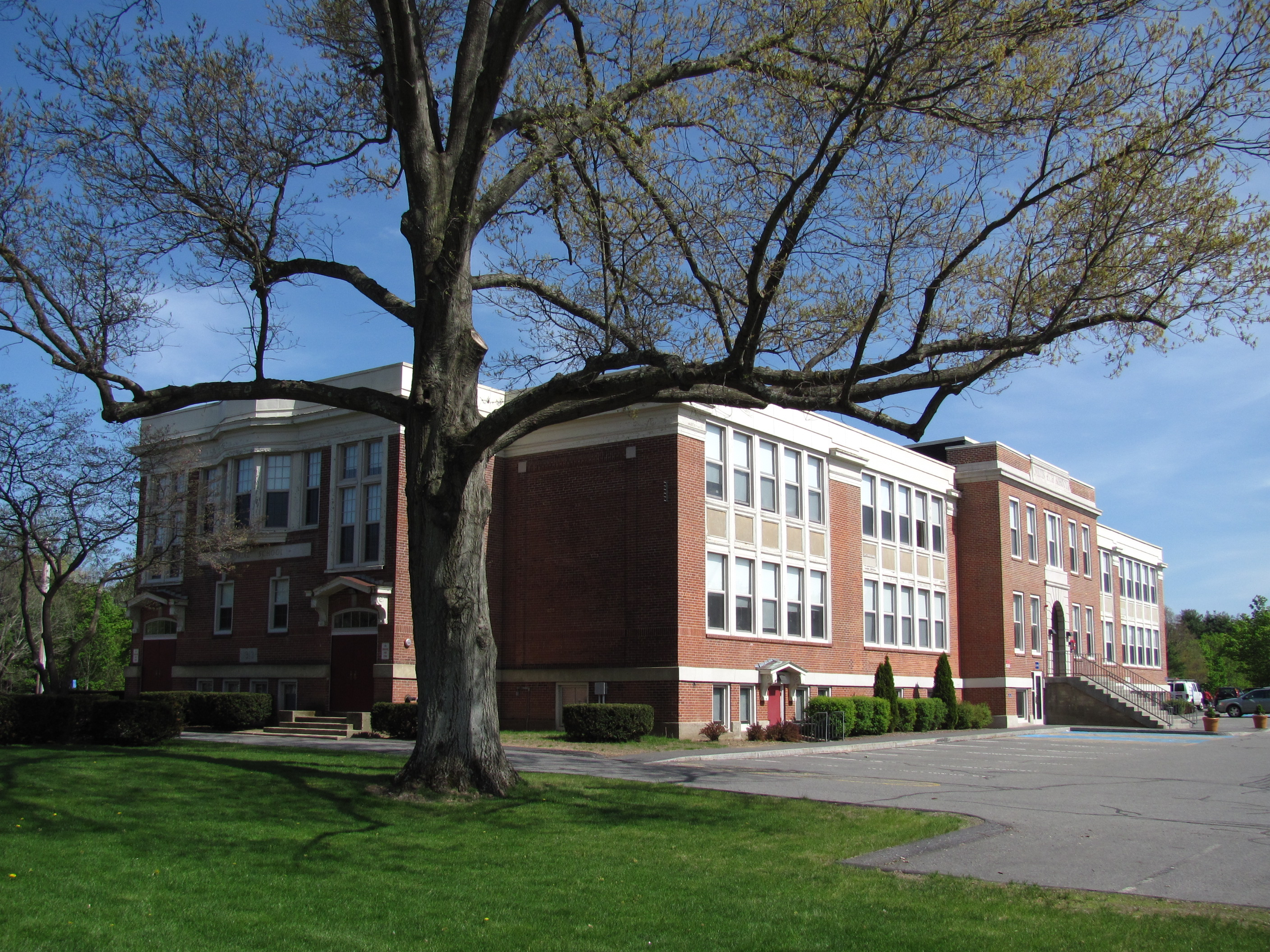
- Veterans Memorial Building

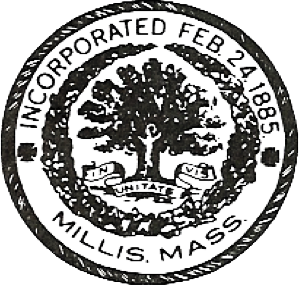
- Seal
- Motto: In unitate vis (Latin "Strength in Unity")
- Location in Norfolk County in Massachusetts
- Coordinates: 42°10′03″N 71°21′30″W
- Country: United States
- State: Massachusetts
- County: Norfolk
- Settled: 1657
- Incorporated: 1885

Government
  - Type: Open town meeting
  - Town Administrator: Michael Guzinski

Area
  - Total: 12.3 sq mi (31.8 km^{2})
  - Land: 12.2 sq mi (31.5 km^{2})
  - Water: 0.12 sq mi (0.3 km^{2})
- Elevation: 160 ft (50 m)

Population (2020)
  - Total: 8,460
  - Density: 696/sq mi (268.6/km^{2})
- Time zone: UTC-5 (Eastern)
  - Summer (DST): UTC-4 (Eastern)
- ZIP code: 02054
- Area code: 508 / 774
- FIPS code: 25-41515
- GNIS feature ID: 0618324
- Website: www.millisma.gov

Millis is a town in Norfolk County in the U.S. state of Massachusetts. It had a population of 8,460 at the 2020 census. It contains the census-designated place of Millis-Clicquot. The town is approximately 19 miles (31 km) southwest of downtown Boston and is bordered by Norfolk, Sherborn, Holliston, Medfield, and Medway. Massachusetts state routes 109 and 115 run through Millis.

== History ==
Millis was first settled in 1657 and was officially incorporated in 1885. Millis was originally part of Dedham, until that town granted the lands of Millis, and other present day surrounding towns, to Medfield in 1651. In 1713, pioneers of Medfield applied for a grant to create a new town and, when approved, named this new land Medway. This new town consisted of West Medway (the present day town of Medway) and East Medway (present day Millis). Lansing Millis, the founder of the town of Millis, successfully incorporated Millis in the Commonwealth of Massachusetts on February 24, 1885.

Lansing Millis was successful in turning the small town of Millis into an important area of Massachusetts. Lansing Millis, who was widely known as a railroad entrepreneur, built up a strong rail system in Millis. This was arguably his most important accomplishment, as the rail system is regarded as the most significant factor in its independence from Medway. In addition, the railroad system was a major factor in the early promotion of economic growth in the town and the integration of Millis to the larger cities of Dedham, Boston and Cambridge. Currently, this old railroad that formerly began in Medway is known as the Bay Colony Railroad. The Medway tracks have since been dismantled, making Millis the railroad's western terminus. The railroad is now mostly defunct, but several miles of the Bay Colony tracks in Millis are owned by the MBTA and are leased by the Bay Colony Railroad line. The Bay Colony Railroad merges with the present day MBTA Commuter Rail in Needham.

Aside from the tremendous contribution of the rail system to Millis' integration with the major Massachusetts cities, another important moment in the town's history is the construction of the Hartford and Dedham Turnpike, known today as Massachusetts Route 109. The road was constructed in 1806 and officially accepted by the town of Millis in 1896. The Hartford and Dedham Turnpike connected Millis, Medway, Medfield, and several other towns directly to Dedham and Boston. Today, Route 109 still serves as a major road connecting Metrowest Boston communities to the city of Boston.

Millis was the home of the "Millis Wonderland", a display of Christmas decorations and lights on the 40-acre (160,000 m^{2}) Causeway Street estate of Kevin Meehan, the owner of several car dealerships. In 2004, Al Roker traveled to Millis for a segment centered on the "Millis Wonderland". After the publicity on The Today Show, an estimated 6,000 cars traveled to the "Millis Lights" daily during the Christmas season. The display was permanently closed after the 2014 holiday season.

=== Industrial history ===
The industrial history of Millis is long and varied, beginning with the water power of a small establishment named Hinsdell's mill. Soon, Millis grew from a small new town with a mill to a successful industrial society. Numerous industries opened up in the town and stimulated employment and growth. Some of these industries include the Holbrook factories, which included a bell foundry, organ manufactory, and organ pipe manufactory, Clicquot Club, and Herman Shoe Company; the latter two being the most notable industries in the town's history.

Today the prominent employers in the town are Tresca Brothers Sand & Gravel and Roche Bros. Supermarket. Millis was also home to a thriving automobile recycling industry located in the western, industrial section of town.

==== Herman Shoe Company ====
The Herman Shoe Company was an extremely important industry in town. The Herman Shoe Company, a result of several private buyouts, produced large amounts of material, specifically boots and other equipment, during the Spanish–American War. In addition, it produced most of the boots worn by the troops during World War II.

The company is now out of business and the former factory was demolished in March 2020.

==== Clicquot Club ====
Cliquot Club was started by Henry Millis, using funds from his father and founder of Millis, Lansing Millis. The company, which distributed the first brand of ginger ale in the United States for about eighty years, was located on Main Street and is the namesake for the village of Clicquot in Millis. The ginger ale produced by Clicquot Club was made using local Millis ginger. Later, the company produced several different sodas and was the first company in the nation to can drinks. Clicquot Club owned more than 100 factories throughout the United States and sold its beverages internationally. As sales declined in the 1960s, however, the company went bankrupt and was bought by the Cott company, which in turn was acquired by Canada Dry.

==== Causeway Street and the Brickyards ====
An area of land around Causeway Street, although now a rural street in the west of town, was once a huge industrial hub for the early town of Millis. This area of Causeway Street was used for clay excavation for the manufacture of bricks, as well as sand excavation. The clay excavations were turned into bricks that built many large estates and buildings in the immediate area and beyond. The remnants of clay pits today look like small ponds. In fact, one of the clay pits is so large that it is now a body of water named Heather's Pond. These abandoned pits are home to many species of wildlife and are protected along with the Great Black Swamp. Historically, the sand from the pits was used to fill in the most recent runway at Logan International Airport. Today, the remnants of old sand pits lie vacant.

The several large brickyards around Causeway Street were owned by a few wealthy families. One of these estates, the Clark Family estate, was later the home to former Massachusetts Governor and United States Secretary of State Christian Herter.

=== Notable sites ===
One of the most important sites in Millis is Richardson's Tavern, which was built c. 1720. This tavern accommodated George Washington for lunch on his way to Cambridge in 1775. It is rumored that Nathan Hale and the Marquis de Lafayette also stopped at the tavern to dine.

Millis' cemetery, called Prospect Hill Cemetery, is home to the grave of Christian Herter, the United States Secretary of State under President Dwight D. Eisenhower. Secretary Herter lived on a large farm on Causeway Street in Millis and, it is rumored, when summoned to Washington, D.C., he left his farm directly by helicopter to Logan International Airport. Prospect Hill Cemetery is listed on the National Historic Register.

=== King Philip's War ===
The history of Millis is closely tied with King Philip's War of 1675 to 1676. On February 21, 1676, Native Americans killed 17 Medfield citizens and destroyed half of the town (32 houses, two mills, and many barns). Immediately after this attack, the Native Americans under King Philip (Metacom) fled to Millis where they held a grand feast. This spot is marked by "The King Philip Trees", which are two hundred-year-old trees protected by the Millis Historical Society. The next day, on February 22, the Native American forces led an offensive against the Fayerbanke Palisades at Boggestowe Farms, which are in present-day Millis. This attack was repulsed, as well as a second attack, which occurred on May 6.

== Geography ==
There are many areas of town-administered land, which helps to protect the environment and limit development. In addition, Millis has several wells and is home to various large farms.

The Charles River runs through Millis and the town has other smaller streams and brooks; most notably Bogastow Brook. Bogastow Brook, named after the Indian tribe formerly inhabiting the area, rises in East Holliston and runs through Millis, emptying in Millis' South End Pond.

Millis is also home to the Great Black Swamp. This swamp, covering hundreds of acres, is a very important characteristic of Millis. This swamp geographically divides Millis from its neighboring town Medway, and is a significant factor in the separation of the two towns in 1885.

According to the United States Census Bureau, the town has a total area of 12.3 square miles (32 km^{2}). Of this, 12.2 square miles (32 km^{2}) is land and 0.1 square miles (0.26 km^{2}) (0.90%) is water.

== Demographics ==
Historical population
| Year | Pop. | ±% |
|---|---|---|
| 1890 | 786 | — |
| 1900 | 1,053 | +34.0% |
| 1910 | 1,399 | +32.9% |
| 1920 | 1,485 | +6.1% |
| 1930 | 1,738 | +17.0% |
| 1940 | 2,278 | +31.1% |
| 1950 | 2,551 | +12.0% |
| 1960 | 4,374 | +71.5% |
| 1970 | 5,686 | +30.0% |
| 1980 | 6,908 | +21.5% |
| 1990 | 7,613 | +10.2% |
| 2000 | 7,902 | +3.8% |
| 2010 | 7,891 | −0.1% |
| 2020 | 8,460 | +7.2% |
| 2024* | 9,338 | +10.4% |
* = population estimate. Source: United States Census records and Population Estimates Program data.

As of the 2020 census, there were 8,472 people. The racial makeup of Millis is 92.3% White, 1.8% African American, 0.0% Native American, 1.7% Asian, 1.0% two or more races, and Hispanic or Latino of any race were 2.5% of the population. 11.1% of the population is foreign born and 14.9% of people over 5 years old speak a language other than English at home.

As of 2020 there are 3,110 households, with an average household size of 2.65 people. 82.7% of housing is owner-occupied with a median value of $446,200. 4.9% of the population is persons under 5 years old, 21.4% of the population is persons 18 years old and under, and 19.6% of the population is persons 65 years old and older. Female make up 52.5% of the population.

The median household income is $114,255.. The per capita income for the town was $50,185. Approximately 1.2% of the population is impoverished. 96.5% of persons over 25 years old had a high diploma and 48.4% of persons over 25 years old had a bachelor's degree or higher. 96.2% of households had a computer and 94.2% of households had a broadband internet subscription.

== Government ==
The town is part of the Massachusetts Senate's Norfolk, Bristol and Middlesex district.

== Education ==
The Millis school system is led by Superintendent Robert Mullaney, the former principal of Millis High School. The district consists of three schools: Clyde F. Brown Elementary School and Millis Middle/High School and has a student population of 1,175. As of the 2021-2022 school year 29.9% of students are high needs, 18.85 are low-income, 14.2% are students with disabilities, 6.4% have a first language other than English, and 2% are English language learners. The district had a student teacher ratio of 12:1.

In 2007 Millis was awarded the Blue Ribbon School Of Excellence award by the Federal Government under the No Child Left Behind Act. In addition, Millis High School has been awarded Silver Medal status in U.S. News & World Report's online ranking of U.S. high schools. In 2010, Millis earned Silver Medal status as one of America's Best High Schools in U.S. News & World Report's latest ranking of public high schools. The magazine editors analyzed 18,743 high schools in the United States and ranked Millis High School in the top 3%. As of 2021, Millis High School is ranked #74 in Massachusetts by U.S. News & World Report.

The Millis Public Library is the only library in the town and is part of the Minuteman Library Network.

== Notable people ==
- Matthew Boldy, NHL Hockey player for the Minnesota Wild
- Haskell Curry, noted mathematician and logician and pioneer in the area of functional programming
- Misha Defonseca (Monique De Wael), author. Misha claimed to be a Holocaust survivor. She is famous for her book Misha: A Memoire of the Holocaust Years, which she later admitted was fictitious
- Christian Herter, U.S. Secretary of State under Dwight D. Eisenhower
- John Kerry, U.S. Senator. Senator Kerry lived at 359 Orchard Street in Millis until the age of seven, when the family moved to Washington, D.C. On July 4, 2004, the CBS show CBS Sunday Morning aired a segment on the upcoming presidential election between George W. Bush and Kerry. In this segment, Millis was featured as John Kerry's hometown. Jeffrey Hardin, a Millis selectman, was interviewed
- John St. Cyr, politician, lawyer, and judge
- Isaac Kramnick, American political theorist
