= Santa Claus Is Comin' to Town =

1934 Christmas song

- One of the covers for the 1934 sheet music

Song
- Published: 1934 by Leo Feist, Inc.
- Songwriters: J. Fred Coots and Haven Gillespie

"Santa Claus Is Comin' to Town" is a Christmas song written by J. Fred Coots and Haven Gillespie and first recorded by Harry Reser and his Orchestra. When it was covered by Eddie Cantor on his radio show in November 1934, it became a hit; within 24 hours, 500,000 copies of sheet music and more than 30,000 records were sold. The version for Bluebird Records by George Hall and his Orchestra (vocal by Sonny Schuyler) was very popular in 1934 and reached the various charts of the day. The song has been recorded by more than 200 artists, including Bing Crosby and the Andrews Sisters, Frank Sinatra, the Crystals, Neil Diamond, Fred Astaire, Bruce Springsteen, the Temptations, The Pointer Sisters, Mariah Carey, Kylie Minogue, the Carpenters, the Jackson 5, Michael Bublé, Luis Miguel, Michael Bolton, Justin Bieber, Dolly Parton, Lady Gaga, and Laufey.

== History ==
=== Recordings ===
The earliest known recorded version of the song was by banjoist Harry Reser and his Orchestra on October 24, 1934 (Decca 264A) featuring Tom Stacks on vocal, the version shown in the Variety charts of December 1934. The song was a sheet-music hit, reaching number one. The song was also recorded for Victor Records (catalog No. 25145A) on September 26, 1935, by Tommy Dorsey and his Orchestra with vocals by Cliff Weston and Edythe Wright.

The song is a traditional Christmas standard and has been covered by numerous recording artists. Bing Crosby and the Andrews Sisters reached the Billboard charts briefly in 1947 with it.

==== 1960s ====
In 1962, the Four Seasons version charted at number 23 on Billboard. In 1963, producer Phil Spector included a version of the song on his rock album A Christmas Gift for You from Phil Spector performed by the Crystals. The refrain from that specific version was used in several later covers, including those by the Jackson 5, Bruce Springsteen, and Mariah Carey. In 1965, the Supremes' version charted at number four in Singapore.

==== 1970s to 1990s ====
In 1970, Rankin-Bass produced Santa Claus Is Comin' to Town, an hour-long animated TV film based on the song, with Fred Astaire narrating the origin of Santa Claus. The same year, the Jackson 5 included the song on their best-selling album Jackson 5 Christmas Album. The Jackson 5 version would chart 50 years later on the Billboard 100 at number 33. In 1971, the Partridge Family included the song on A Partridge Family Christmas Card. An eccentric 1972 live recording by Joseph Spence has been described as "a performance for the ages" by music critic Peter Margasak. The Carpenters released the song as a single in 1974.

A rock version by Bruce Springsteen & the E Street Band was recorded on December 12, 1975, at C. W. Post College in Brookville, New York, by Record Plant engineers Jimmy Iovine and Thom Panunzio. This version borrows the chorus refrain from the 1963 recording by the Crystals. It was first released as a track on the 1981 Sesame Street compilation album, In Harmony 2, as well as on a 1981 promotional, radio-only, 7-inch single (Columbia AE7 1332). Four years later, it was released as the B-side to "My Hometown", a single off the Born in the U.S.A. album. Springsteen's rendition of the song has received radio airplay perennially at Christmastime for years; it appeared on Billboard magazine's Hot Singles Recurrents chart each year from 2002 to 2009 due to seasonal air play. The band was known for encouraging its audiences to sing along with the song during live concerts, fully engaging the crowd as part of the performance.

In 1977, an instrumental version was recorded by Snuff Garrett and his 50 Guitars.

Australian ABBA tribute act Björn Again released a version in 1992 that reached number 55 on the UK Singles Chart. Other well-known versions of this song include Mariah Carey from the album Merry Christmas (1994) and the Pointer Sisters version off the album A Very Special Christmas, also borrowing from the Crystals' arrangement. Andy Williams performed the song on his album I Still Believe in Santa Claus, which was released on October 1, 1990.

==== 2000s to present ====
Luis Miguel recorded the song in Spanish as "Santa Claus llegó a la ciudad" for his Christmas album Navidades (2006). His version of the song peaked at number 26 on the Billboard Latin Pop Songs chart. The song has also been recorded in a cappella versions. First by Straight No Chaser on their 2008 album Holiday Spirits and later by Pentatonix on their 2014 album That's Christmas to Me. In October 2015, EMI Music Publishing lost the rights to J. Fred Coot's stake in the song. EMI had earned the rights to the song via Leo Feist's publishing company in the 1980s. In September 2017, the family of Haven Gillespie sued Memory Lane Music Group for $700,000, asking for an 85% stake in "Santa Claus Is Comin' to Town".

Sebastián Yatra recorded a Spanish version for Christmas 2019 and released it as a single. The song charted in Spain and on Billboard's Hot Latin Songs chart and was certified gold by the RIAA in the U.S. In November 2024, YouTuber jschlatt released a cover of the song as the first single from his Christmas album, "A Very 1999 Christmas".

== Charts ==
=== Frank Sinatra version ===
Chart (2022–2025)	Peak position
Austria (Ö3 Austria Top 40)	29
Germany (GfK)	31
Global 200 (Billboard)	85
Greece International (IFPI)	94
Italy (FIMI)	14
Netherlands (Single Top 100)	87
Poland (Polish Airplay Top 100)	35
Switzerland (Schweizer Hitparade)	36

=== The Supremes version ===
Chart (1966)	Peak position
Malaysia (Billboard)	2
Singapore (Billboard)	1
Chart (2011)	Peak position
UK Singles (OCC)	167

=== The Jackson 5 version ===
Chart (2011–2024)	Peak position
Australia (ARIA)	27
Global 200 (Billboard)	37
Greece International Digital Singles (IFPI)	76
Hungary (Stream Top 40)	33
Ireland (IRMA)	37
Lithuania (AGATA)	49
Netherlands (Single Top 100)	75
New Zealand (Recorded Music NZ)	27
Portugal (AFP)	99
Sweden (Sverigetopplistan)	86
Switzerland (Schweizer Hitparade)	69
UK Singles (Official Charts)	30
US Billboard Hot 100	30
US Holiday 100 (Billboard)	24

=== Bruce Springsteen version ===
Chart (2007–2025)	Peak position
Australia (ARIA)	39
Austria (Ö3 Austria Top 40)	74
Canada Hot 100 (Billboard)	36
Estonia Airplay (TopHit)	68
Germany (GfK)	80
Global 200 (Billboard)	55
Greece International (IFPI)	71
Ireland (IRMA)	36
Italy (FIMI)	35
Lithuania (AGATA)	62
Netherlands (Single Top 100)	34
New Zealand (Recorded Music NZ)	31
Portugal (AFP)	72
Sweden (Sverigetopplistan)	12
Switzerland (Schweizer Hitparade)	56
UK Singles (Official Charts)	41

=== Luis Miguel version ===
Chart (2007)	Peak position
US Hot Latin Songs (Billboard)	26

=== Mariah Carey version ===
Chart (2010–2023)	Peak position
Hungary (Single Top 40)	17
Netherlands (Single Tip 30)	1
Slovakia Airplay (ČNS IFPI)	48
South Korea (Gaon Digital Chart)	135
US Holiday 100 (Billboard)	45

=== Glee Cast version ===
Chart (2011–2012)	Peak position
US Holiday Digital Songs (Billboard)	29

=== Michael Bublé version ===
Chart (2011–2026)	Peak position
Australia (ARIA)	67
Austria (Ö3 Austria Top 40)	71
Croatia (HRT)	90
Czech Republic Singles Digital (ČNS IFPI)	47
Finland (Suomen virallinen lista)	20
France (SNEP)	98
Germany (GfK)	66
Global 200 (Billboard)	91
Greece International (IFPI)	67
Hungary (Single Top 40)	28
Hungary (Stream Top 40)	14
Italy (FIMI)	11
Latvia (LAIPA)	30
Netherlands (Single Top 100)	38
Norway (IFPI Norge)	91
Poland (Polish Streaming Top 100)	90
Portugal (AFP)	43
Slovakia Singles Digital (ČNS IFPI)	39
Spain (Promusicae)	29
Sweden (Sverigetopplistan)	43
Switzerland (Schweizer Hitparade)	43
UK Singles (Official Charts)	77
US Adult Contemporary (Billboard)	8
US Holiday 100 (Billboard)	35

=== Various artists version ===
Chart (2019)	Peak position
US Rolling Stone Top 100	72

=== Sebastián Yatra version ===
Chart (2020–2022)	Peak position
Spain (Promusicae)	76
US Hot Latin Songs (Billboard)	21

=== Lady Gaga version ===
Chart (2024)	Peak position
Japan Hot Overseas (Billboard Japan)	19
New Zealand Hot Singles (RMNZ)	26

=== Laufey version ===
Chart (2025)	Peak position
Iceland (Tónlistinn)	29
Netherlands (Single Tip 30)	24
UK Singles Sales (OCC)	19
UK Vinyl Singles (OCC)	6

== Certifications ==
=== Frank Sinatra version ===
Region	Certification	Certified units/sales
Denmark (IFPI Danmark)	Gold	45,000^{‡}
Germany (BVMI)	Gold	300,000^{‡}
Italy (FIMI)	Platinum	100,000^{‡}
^{‡} Sales+streaming figures based on certification alone.

=== The Crystals version ===
Region	Certification	Certified units/sales
United Kingdom (BPI)	Silver	200,000^{‡}
^{‡} Sales+streaming figures based on certification alone.

=== The Jackson 5 version ===
Region	Certification	Certified units/sales
Australia (ARIA)	Platinum	70,000^{‡}
New Zealand (RMNZ)	Platinum	30,000^{‡}
United Kingdom (BPI)	Platinum	600,000^{‡}
^{‡} Sales+streaming figures based on certification alone.

=== Bruce Springsteen version ===
Region	Certification	Certified units/sales
Australia (ARIA)	Gold	35,000^{‡}
Denmark (IFPI Danmark)	Gold	45,000^{‡}
Italy (FIMI)	Platinum	100,000^{‡}
New Zealand (RMNZ)	Gold	15,000^{‡}
Portugal (AFP)	Gold	12,000^{‡}
United Kingdom (BPI)	Platinum	600,000^{‡}
United States (RIAA)	Platinum	1,000,000^{‡}
^{‡} Sales+streaming figures based on certification alone.

=== Mariah Carey version ===
Region	Certification	Certified units/sales
Australia (ARIA)	Gold	35,000^{‡}
Canada (Music Canada)	Gold	40,000^{‡}
United States (RIAA)	Gold	500,000^{‡}
^{‡} Sales+streaming figures based on certification alone.

=== Michael Bublé version ===
Region	Certification	Certified units/sales
Denmark (IFPI Danmark)	Platinum	90,000^{‡}
Italy (FIMI)	Platinum	70,000^{‡}
New Zealand (RMNZ)	Gold	15,000^{‡}
Portugal (AFP)	Gold	5,000^{‡}
United Kingdom (BPI)	Platinum	600,000^{‡}
^{‡} Sales+streaming figures based on certification alone.

=== Justin Bieber version ===
Region	Certification	Certified units/sales
Canada (Music Canada)	Gold	40,000^{‡}
United States (RIAA)	Gold	500,000^{‡}
^{‡} Sales+streaming figures based on certification alone.

=== Sebastián Yatra version ===
Region	Certification	Certified units/sales
United States (RIAA)	Gold (Latin)	30,000^{‡}
^{‡} Sales+streaming figures based on certification alone.

== See also ==
- List of Christmas carols
