= Harry Reser =

American banjo player and bandleader (1896–1965)

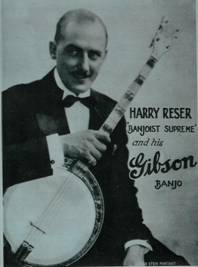

Background information
- Born: Harrison Franklin Reser; January 17, 1896; Piqua, Ohio, U.S.
- Died: September 27, 1965 (aged 69) New York City, U.S.
- Genres: Jazz
- Occupations: Musician, bandleader
- Instrument: Banjo
- Formerly of: The Clicquot Club Eskimos

Harrison Franklin Reser (January 17, 1896 – September 27, 1965) was an American banjo player and bandleader. Born in Piqua, Ohio, Reser was best known as the leader of The Clicquot Club Eskimos. He was regarded by some as the best banjoist of the 1920s.

== Early life ==
Reser was born in Piqua, Ohio, to William Scott Reser and Alberta Wright. The couple had another child, Ruth. Reser was a first cousin to Orville & Wilbur Wright, the Wright brothers, inventors of the airplane. When he was 2 years of age, his father moved the family to Dayton, Ohio. His musical talents became apparent, and it was also here that it was discovered that the young Reser possessed perfect pitch. His parents realized they had a child prodigy. A special guitar was made for him suited to his extremely small size, and this was his first instrument.

By the age of 8 he was entertaining. Years later, he recalled, "Of course, being a kid, and playing for various minor concerts and recitals naturally gave me somewhat of a hero feeling, but I was never able to get the attitude of a great many people whom I often heard talking prodigies, juvenile wonders and any number of other equally mysterious things in connection with my playing. It never seemed in the least remarkable or extraordinary that I played at the age of eight."

About this time he began learning piano and also started a systematic study of music which was to form the basis for his natural genius and extensive knowledge of music theory. At the age of nine his parents, now realizing his potential and the benefits to be gained, sent him to Luis Hein and Albert Fischer of Dayton, where he continued study of the piano in addition to the violin and cello. He remained with the two until the age of fourteen. Reser attended Steele High School in Dayton, and it was during these years that he decided what his vocation would be. On April 8, 1916, when he was just over twenty, he married Grace Tharp of Dayton in Newport, Kentucky.

== Career ==
The banjo was making its presence felt more strongly with dance bands and therefore he felt he should learn how to play it as quickly as possible. He practiced until he was able to play to a high enough standard to supplement his piano playing, thus increasing his chances of earning a reasonable living. In the summer of 1920 he played in a Dayton dance band under the leadership of Paul Goss. By this time he was playing the banjo regularly. He soon moved to Buffalo, New York to appear at the Hippodrome, playing primarily violin, though continuing to work on his banjo technique as well.

After Christmas of 1920, he moved to New York City. He sought out engagements and soon found himself in demand. Some of the early bands he was involved with included those of Ben Selvin, Benny Krueger, Sam Lanin, Nathan Glantz, and Mike Markel (for whom he played saxophone).

By 1922, he had recorded a half dozen pieces, including "Crazy Jo" and Zez Confrey's "Kitten on the Keys". In early autumn of the same year, he considered starting his own band. Soon a contract was drawn up with Okeh Records and his first band, the Okeh Syncopators, came into being during September or October 1922. Shortly after the start of this new endeavor he was approached by Paul Whiteman to sit in for Whiteman's regular banjoist, Mike Pingitore, during a UK tour of the Paul Whiteman Orchestra.

Reser had three original compositions written for tenor banjo; The Cat and the Dog, Cracker Jack, and Lolly Pops.

In 1925, he found fame as the director for NBC's Clicquot Club Eskimo Orchestra, continuing with that weekly half-hour until 1935. At the same time, he also led other bands using pseudonyms. "Harry Reser and His Six Jumping Jacks", with vocals by Tom Stacks, were the zany forerunners to comedy bands like Spike Jones and His City Slickers.

Reser and his band were the first to record "Santa Claus Is Coming to Town" in 1934. In December 1934, he and the orchestra began a weekly broadcast on NBC radio, with Peg LaCentra and Ray Heatherton as vocalists.

Throughout his career he was an endorsed artist, playing instruments from several well-known makers. During the 1920s he mainly played a variety of William L. Lange's Paramount tenor and plectrum banjos, and Lange presented him with a Super Paramount Artists Supreme, as he also did to Mike Pingitore, another Paramount musician. Later Reser would play Gibson and Vegavox banjos.

Harry Reser played "Tiger Rag" and "You Hit the Spot" in the Vitaphone musical short Harry Reser and His Eskimos (1936).

Reser remained active in music for the rest of his life, leading TV studio orchestras and playing with Broadway theatre orchestras. In 1960 he appeared with Bing Crosby, Peggy Lee, and Buster Keaton in "A 70th Birthday Salute to Paul Whiteman" on TV's The Revlon Revue. He wrote several instructional books for the banjo, guitar, and ukulele.

In 1965, Reser died of a heart attack in the orchestra pit of Manhattan's Imperial Theatre while warming up for a Broadway stage version of Fiddler on the Roof. He was inducted into the National Four-String Banjo Hall of Fame, a museum in Oklahoma, in 1999.

== Reser revivals ==
In 2002, banjoist Michael Mason portrayed Harry Reser in Heartland Chautauqua, a tent-show recreation of a 1920s traveling Chautauqua show at Nifong Park in Missouri. Guitarist Howard Alden switched to a banjo to recreate the sound of Harry Reser for his album Howard Alden Plays the Music of Harry Reser (Stomp Off, 1988). Alden recorded 15 compositions written by Reser during the years 1922 to 1935.

== See also ==
- American Banjo Museum Hall of Fame members
