= Pingitore =

Pingitore is an Italian surname. Notable people with the surname include:

- Mike Pingitore (1888–1952), American jazz musician
- Pier Francesco Pingitore (born 1934), Italian director, screenwriter, playwright, and author
