= Clicquot Club Company =

American beverage company

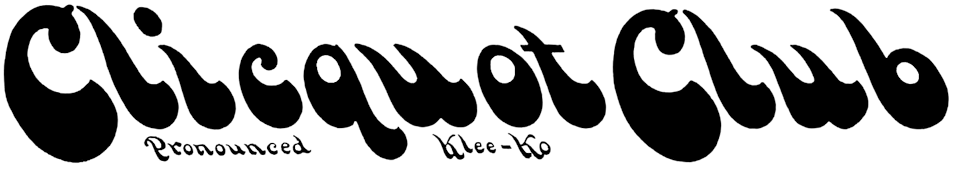
- Clicquot Club Company logo in 1922
- Native name: Clicquot Club Beverages
- Industry: Soft drinks
- Predecessor: LaCroix Fruit Farm
- Founded: 1885 in Millis, Massachusetts, United States
- Founder: Charles LaCroix
- Defunct: 1980
- Fate: Purchased by Cott in 1969, dissolved in 1980
- Headquarters: Millis-Clicquot, Millis, United States
- Products: Sparkling cider Ginger ale Eskimo-Up; Vineyard Punch; Strawberry cream soda Root beer Raspberry soda Cream soda Grape soda

The Clicquot Club Company (pronounced "Klee-ko" /kliːˈkoʊ/), also known as Clicquot Club Beverages, was one of the largest American beverage companies. Founded in 1881, it sold ginger ale and other soft drinks. It was bought by Cott Beverage Corporation in 1969 and the brand was discontinued in the 1980s.

== History ==
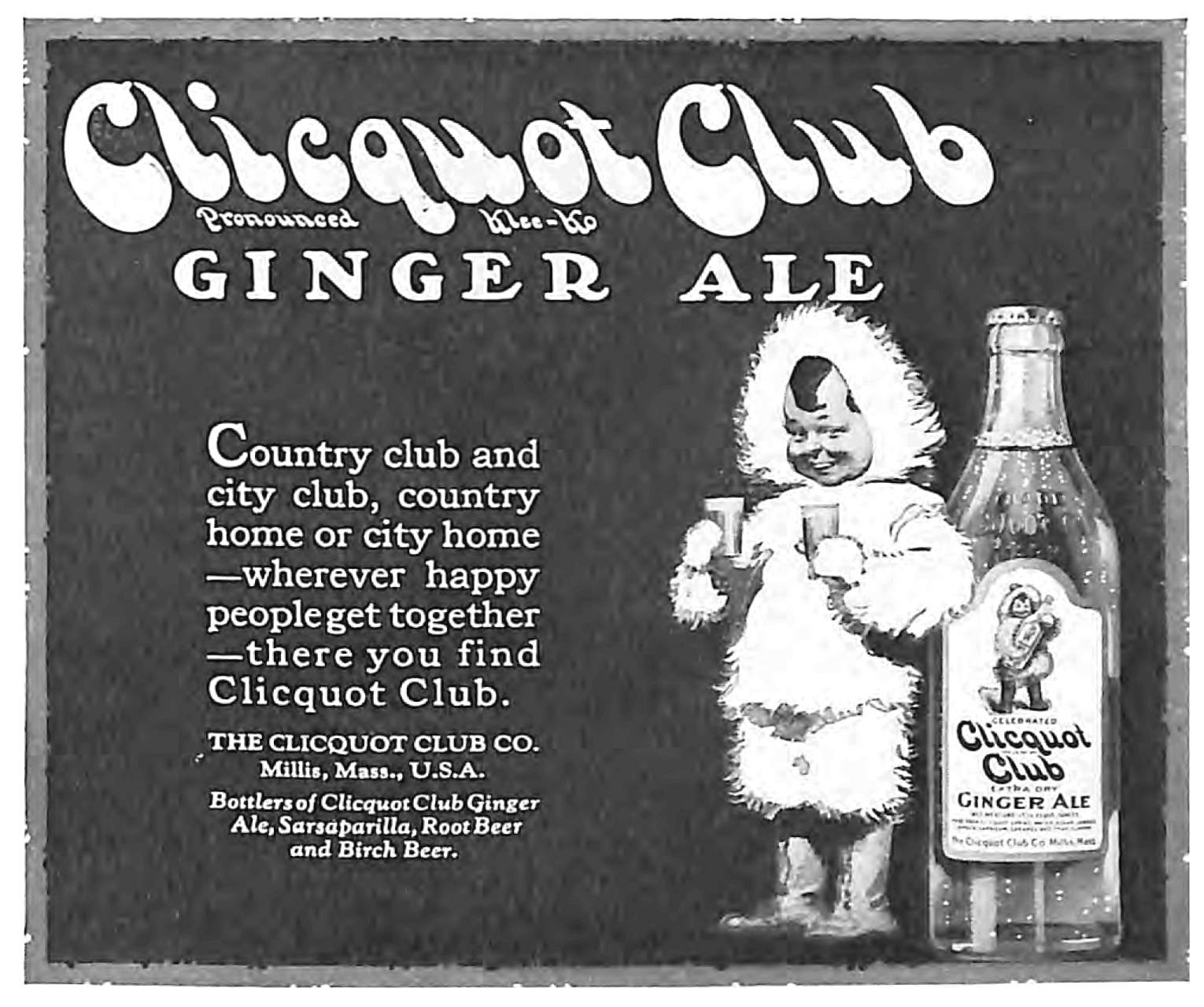
1922 advertisement featuring Kleek-O the Eskimo Boy

In 1881, in the town now known as Millis, Massachusetts, Henry Millis (son of Lansing Millis, after whom the town was named in 1885) made a suggestion to Charles LaCroix, of the LaCroix Fruit Farm, that he call his sparkling cider "Clicquot" - after the famous French champagne, Veuve Clicquot - and start selling it. Shortly after, Clicquot Club was built by Henry Millis from money he had received from his father, Lansing.

The company produced mainly sparkling cider for the first few years but later on Millis would experiment in other flavors as well. The sparkling cider was soon dropped and the company began focusing mainly on ginger ale. During this time the soda company hired a significant amount of the town's residents and would continue to do so for years to come. Millis continued to improve upon his beverages through his philosophy of making the drinks as though he were making them for his own friends. He imported high-quality exotic ingredients including Jamaican ginger and Cuban refined sugar. These two were the key ingredients to his ginger ale making the company standout in this field.

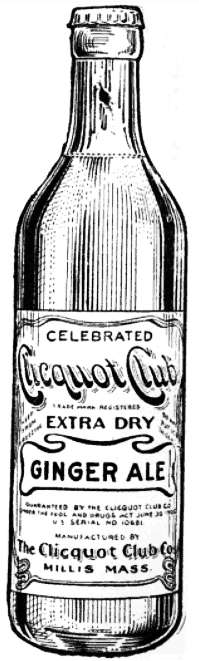
A bottle of Clicquot Club Ginger Ale, the soft drink for which the company was best known.

Even though word of his soda spread over southeastern New England in the next few years, the cost of such fine ingredients eventually forced Henry Millis to sell his company in 1901. The new proprietors, Horace A. Kimball and his son, H. Earle Kimball, took advantage of every form of advertising, including the character "Kleek-O the Eskimo Boy" (which became a well-known advertising symbol); an animated sign in Manhattan's Times Square (said to be the largest animated sign in the world from 1924 to 1926); and even a musical variety radio program, The Clicquot Club Eskimos, led by banjo player Harry F. Reser. There were 25 sessions of records under the supervision of Harry Reser and issued under the name "Clicquot Club Eskimos" recorded from December, 1925 through February, 1931.

Such clever marketing expanded the company until the factory in Millis became 1/3 of a mile long and even had its own private train station. The area around this massive factory became known as "Millis-Clicquot, Massachusetts." The company also was responsible for a number of pioneering moves in an effort to meet demand: In 1893, Clicquot Club was the first to put a metal cap on a bottle; in 1934, the first to sell quart bottles; and in 1938 the company became the first to sell its beverages in a can, at this time known as a "cone-top" can, making it easier to manufacture.

With the establishment of a new network of Clicquot Club Bottling Plants in 1938 the company soon had dozens of factories across the country. This number grew rapidly until in 1952 the company had plants in over 100 cities all across the United States, from Maine to California. In the 1950s the company began distributing internationally, in places such as Jamaica, Nassau, the Bahamas, virtually all of South America, and the Philippines.

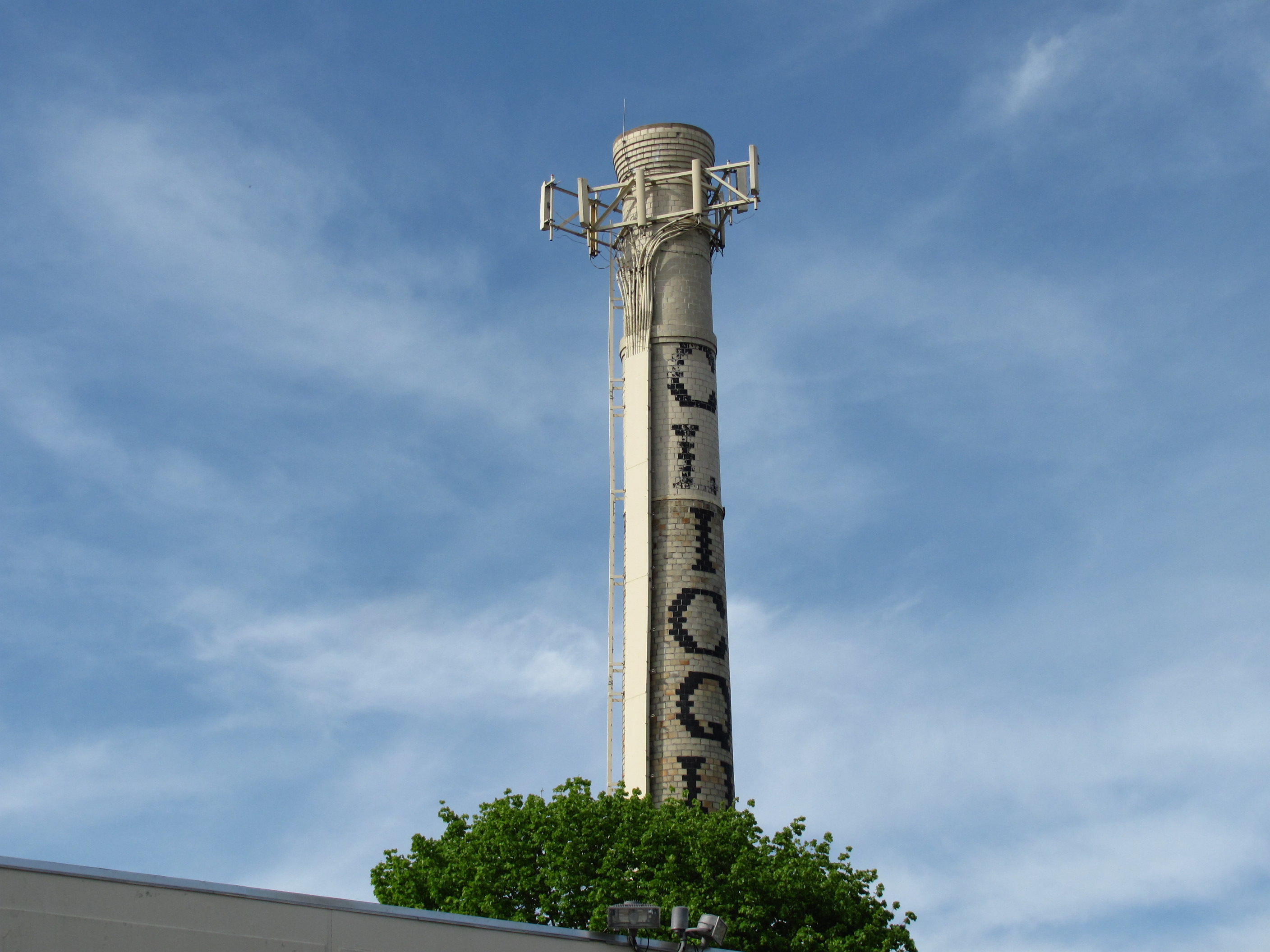
Derelict remnant of the Cliquot Club plant in Millis

The company began to decline in sales worldwide amid growing competition from other soft drink makers and was purchased in 1969 by the Cott Beverage Corporation of Connecticut. The Cott Corporation eventually sold off all product surplus before shutting down Clicquot. Although there has been contemplation of starting the company back up again in recent years, no attempts have ever gotten further than the drawing board.

Today the original plant in Millis is home to a variety of businesses including a grocery distributor, a gymnastics academy, and a moving company. In 2025, Stormalong Cider opened a production facility in the plant complex, the first beverage producer to return to the space since Cliquot's closure in the 1970s.

== Resources ==
- Clicquot Club Page
- Clicquot Club Cafe (archived)
- Clicquot Fox Trot March printed piano music, Copyright 1926 by Harry F. Reser, 148th W. 46th St., New York, N.Y., U.S.A.
