= John St. Cyr =

American politician and judge (1936–2022)

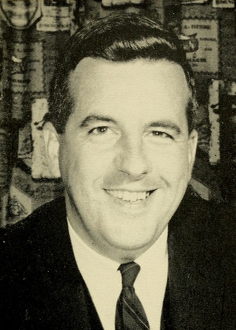
John St Cyr, 1967

John F. St. Cyr (January 8, 1936 – January 27, 2022) was an American politician and judge.

== Biography ==
St. Cyr was born in North Adams, Massachusetts, and graduated from St. Joseph High School in North Adams. He graduated from the College of the Holy Cross in 1957 and from Georgetown University Law Center in 1963. St. Cyr was admitted to the Massachusetts bar and practiced law in Millis, Massachusetts. St. Cyr served in the Massachusetts House of Representatives from 1967 to 1972 and was a Republican. He then served as a Massachusetts District Court judge from 1972 to 1997. He died in Norton, Massachusetts.
