= Millis-Clicquot, Massachusetts =

- Census-designated place
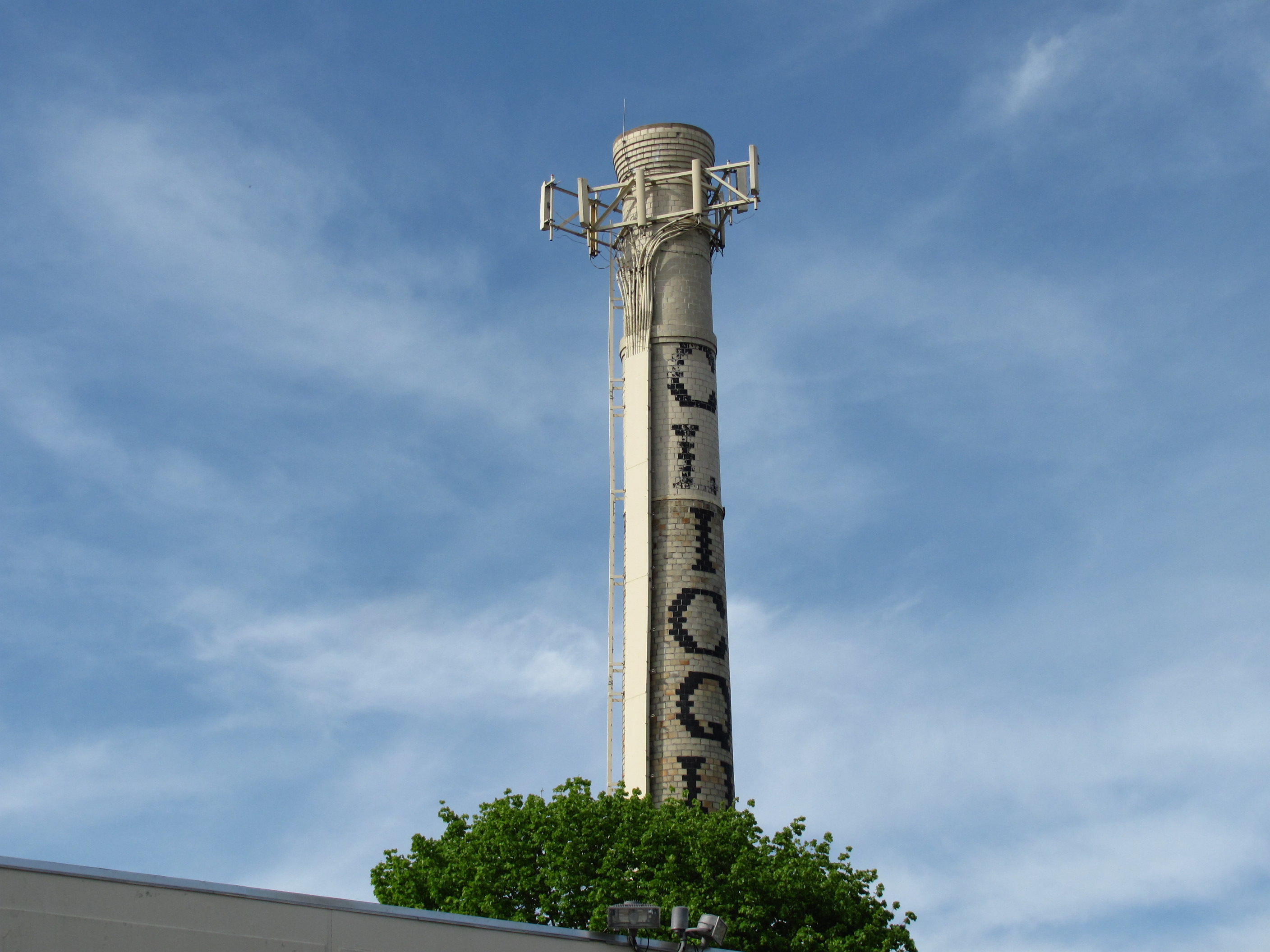
- Clicquot Smoke Stack

- Location in Norfolk County in Massachusetts
- Coordinates: 42°10′9″N 71°21′19″W
- Country: United States
- State: Massachusetts
- County: Norfolk
- Town: Millis

Area
  - Total: 3.17 sq mi (8.22 km^{2})
  - Land: 3.14 sq mi (8.13 km^{2})
  - Water: 0.039 sq mi (0.10 km^{2})

Population (2020)
  - Total: 4,499
  - Density: 1,434.1/sq mi (553.71/km^{2})
- Time zone: UTC-5 (Eastern (EST))
  - Summer (DST): UTC-4 (EDT)
- ZIP Code: 02054 (Millis)
- FIPS code: 25-41532

Millis-Clicquot is a census-designated place (CDP) in the town of Millis in Norfolk County, Massachusetts, United States. As of the 2020 census, Millis-Clicquot had a population of 4,499. The name "Clicquot" comes from the now-defunct Clicquot Club Company, a beverage manufacturer that was founded in the area in 1881.

== Geography ==
Millis-Clicquot is located at 42°10′9″N 71°21′19″W (42.169045, -71.355159).

According to the United States Census Bureau, the CDP has a total area of 8.1 km^{2} (3.1 mi^{2}), of which 3.1 mi^{2} (8.0 km^{2}) is land and 0.04 mi^{2} (0.1 km^{2}) (0.64%) is water.

== Demographics ==
Historical population
Census	Pop.	Note	%±
2020	4,499		—
U.S. Decennial Census

=== 2020 census ===
As of the 2020 census, the median age was 44.3 years. 19.6% of residents were under the age of 18 and 17.7% of residents were 65 years of age or older. For every 100 females there were 88.0 males, and for every 100 females age 18 and over there were 84.8 males age 18 and over.

94.6% of residents lived in urban areas, while 5.4% lived in rural areas.

There were 1,874 households in Millis-Clicquot, of which 28.0% had children under the age of 18 living in them. Of all households, 49.1% were married-couple households, 15.4% were households with a male householder and no spouse or partner present, and 29.2% were households with a female householder and no spouse or partner present. About 30.5% of all households were made up of individuals and 14.2% had someone living alone who was 65 years of age or older.

There were 1,939 housing units, of which 3.4% were vacant. The homeowner vacancy rate was 0.9% and the rental vacancy rate was 4.6%.

Racial composition as of the 2020 census
Race	Number	Percent
White	3,979	88.4%
Black or African American	78	1.7%
American Indian and Alaska Native	8	0.2%
Asian	140	3.1%
Native Hawaiian and Other Pacific Islander	0	0.0%
Some other race	48	1.1%
Two or more races	246	5.5%
Hispanic or Latino (of any race)	154	3.4%

=== 2000 census ===
As of the census of 2000, there were 4,607 people, 1,860 households, and 1,231 families residing in the CDP. The population density was 570.1/km^{2} (1,476.3/mi^{2}). There were 1,891 housing units at an average density of 234.0/km^{2} (606.0/mi^{2}). The racial makeup of the CDP was 96.83% White, 1.02% Black or African American, 0.09% Native American, 1.17% Asian, 0.13% from other races, and 0.76% from two or more races. Hispanic or Latino of any race were 0.89% of the population.

There were 1,860 households, out of which 34.1% had children under the age of 18 living with them, 53.0% were married couples living together, 10.6% had a female householder with no husband present, and 33.8% were non-families. 28.5% of all households were made up of individuals, and 9.2% had someone living alone who was 65 years of age or older. The average household size was 2.46 and the average family size was 3.06.

In the CDP, the population was spread out, with 25.9% under the age of 18, 4.9% from 18 to 24, 35.7% from 25 to 44, 22.3% from 45 to 64, and 11.3% who were 65 years of age or older. The median age was 37 years. For every 100 females, there were 90.6 males. For every 100 females age 18 and over, there were 86.6 males.

The median income for a household in the CDP was $57,909, and the median income for a family was $64,750. Males had a median income of $51,238 versus $37,750 for females. The per capita income for the CDP was $27,483. About 4.6% of families and 4.0% of the population were below the poverty line, including 5.4% of those under age 18 and none of those age 65 or over.
