= Mike Pingitore =

American banjo player

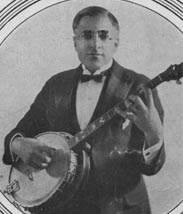

Background information
- Born: October 14, 1888; San Francisco, California, U.S.
- Died: October 30, 1952 (aged 64) North Hollywood, Los Angeles, California, U.S.
- Genres: Jazz
- Occupation: Musician
- Instrument: Banjo
- Years active: 1919–1948

Michael "Mike" Pingitore (or Pingatore; October 14, 1888– October 30, 1952) was a member of Paul Whiteman's Orchestra. Whiteman discovered him playing tenor banjo and he became part of the rhythm section for his newly-formed band for the Alexandria Hotel in Los Angeles (later known as the original Whiteman band), playing there for its entire existence (1919–1948) except for a brief period in 1923 due to illness. Pingitore played banjo on Art Mooney's "I'm Looking Over a Four Leaf Clover", which was a number one hit on the Billboard magazine pop chart in 1948. He was inducted into the American Banjo Museum Hall of Fame in 2005.

== See also ==
- Banjo Hall of Fame Members
