= Tom Stacks =

American jazz musician

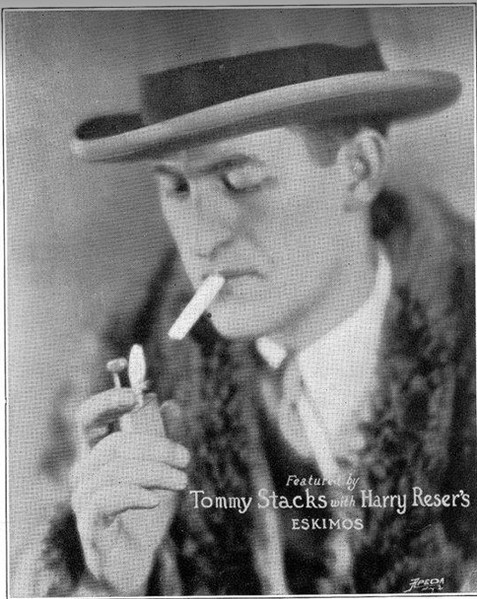

Background information
- Birth name: Thomas De Armen Stacks
- Born: November 9, 1899; Harrisburg, Pennsylvania, U.S.
- Died: February 19, 1936 (aged 36); Manhattan, New York, U.S.
- Genres: Jazz
- Instrument(s): Drums, vocals

Thomas De Armen Stacks, known professionally as Tom Stacks (November 9, 1899 – February 19, 1936) was an American musician who was the lead singer, drummer, and sound effects man for many of Harry Reser's late-1920s jazz and novelty bands that included the Six Jumping Jacks.

== Early life ==
Born on November 9, 1899, in Harrisburg, Pennsylvania, he was the son of Elmer E. and Margaret A. Stacks, both of whom were also Pennsylvania natives.

== Career ==
Stacks was an active musician by early 1920. During his career, Stacks worked as the lead singer and drummer for many of Harry Reser's bands. In 1936, he lived in the Jackson Heights neighborhood of Queens. He died in 1936 when the restaurant he was performing in caught fire.
