= Clicquot Club =

Nightclub in Atlantic City, New Jersey, US

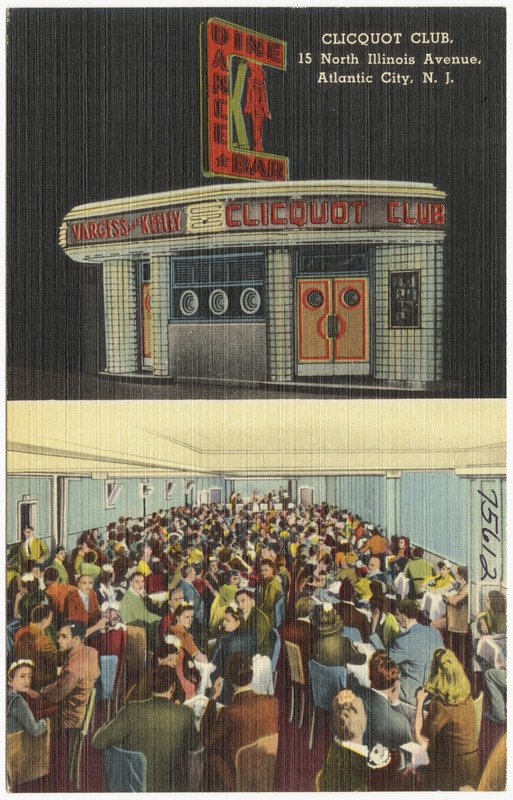

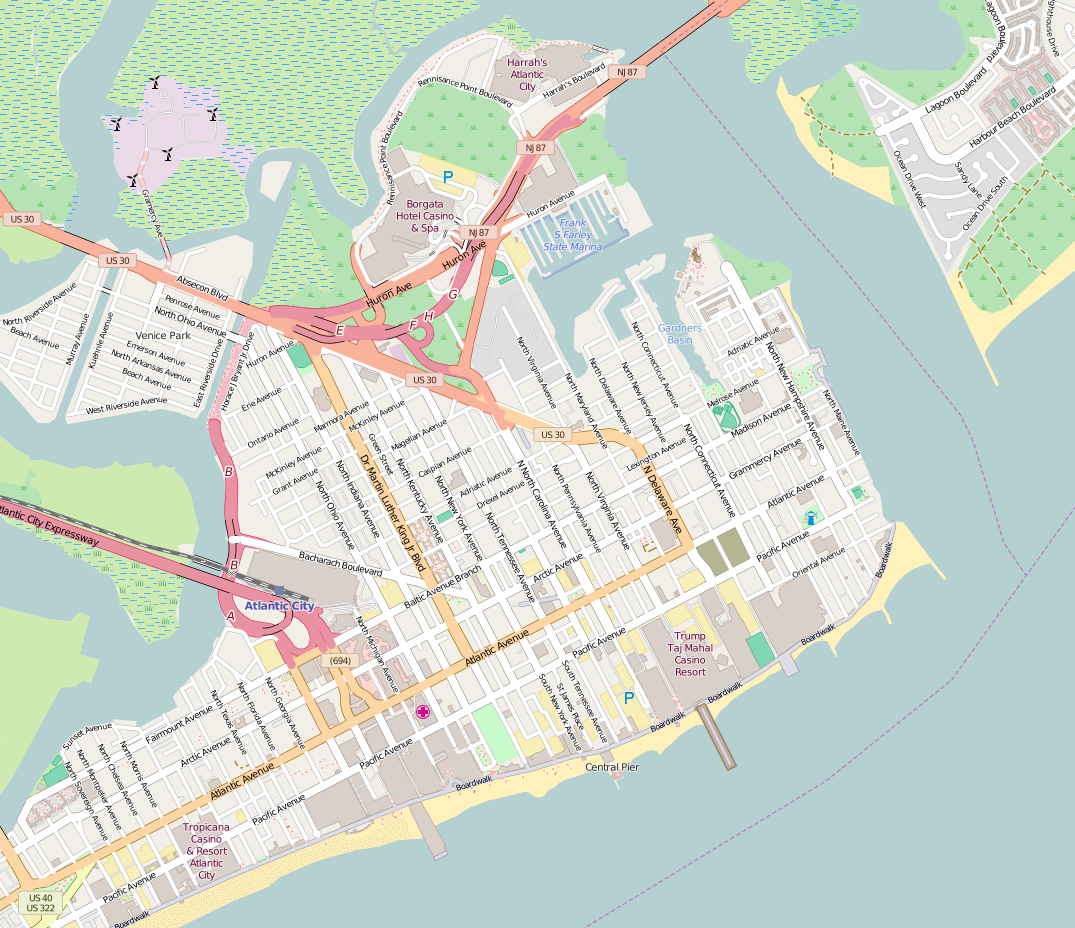
- Location in Atlantic City
- Address: 15 North Illinois Avenue; Atlantic City, New Jersey; United States
- Coordinates: 39°21′38″N 74°25′56″W
- Type: Nightclub

Clicquot Club (pronounced "Klee-ko" /kliːˈkoʊ/) was a nightclub at 15 North Illinois Avenue (Note: Illinois Avenue no longer exists. It was renamed Dr. Martin Luther King Boulevard in 1988.) in Atlantic City, New Jersey, in the heart of the city. Billed as the club that "never closed", it became notorious as an illegal gambling spot in the city.

== History ==
Operating during the Prohibition era in the 1920s, the club provided both illegal liquor and illegal gambling. The bar and cabaret were considered "feeder rooms" to bring people to the profit-making roulette wheels, craps tables, and card games in the backrooms. A news item in December 1931 reported a raid on the club in which Federal agents removed $20,000 worth of lavish Japanese and Chinese furnishings from the 20-room mansion and "poured several thousand dollars worth of alleged whiskies and champagnes down a drain".

The bar and cabaret also developed a reputation for lawlessness, as the Clicquot became known as one of the "bust-out joints" for Philadelphia convention-goers eager to "release their inhibitions as they experienced everything and anything available". Until 1951, when the Kefauver Committee mounted an "anti-hostess campaign", the Clicquot used its waitresses to push drinks on guests and even offer to sit and drink with them, in violation of New Jersey's alcoholic beverage control laws.

The cabaret underwent a series of management changes in the 1940s. In March 1942 Max Cohen assumed management of the cabaret. In February 1943 Cleo Valenteene, a former burlesque and nightclub dancer, became manager, followed by performer Nan DeMar in July 1943. In December 1950 Michael J. Keeley became the owner-operator.

== Shows ==
The Clicquot Club has been called "the leading white nightclub" in Atlantic City. In 1945 popular black bandleader Mandy Ross was booked into an engagement at the club, and a white vocalist refused to perform with the band. In 1946, Eleanor Sherry and Her Swinghearts performed at the club. The cabaret often booked revues, including the 1946 Nan DeMar revue and a 30-performer revue in 1948. Eddie Kaplan was responsible for booking acts to perform at the club in the late 1940s. In 1947 drink prices started at 90 cents at the Clicquot Club, Paddock International, and Club Harlem.

== Sources ==
- Anselmo D'Amato, Grace (2001). Chance of a Lifetime: Nucky Johnson, Skinny D'Amato, and how Atlantic City Became the Naughty Queen of Resorts. Down the Shore Pub. ISBN 0945582757.
- Kennedy, Rod; Waltzer, Jim (2004). Monopoly: The Story Behind the World's Best-Selling Game. Gibbs Smith. ISBN 1586853228.
- Kukla, Barbara J. (2002). Swing City: Newark Nightlife, 1925–50. Rutgers University Press. ISBN 0813531160.
