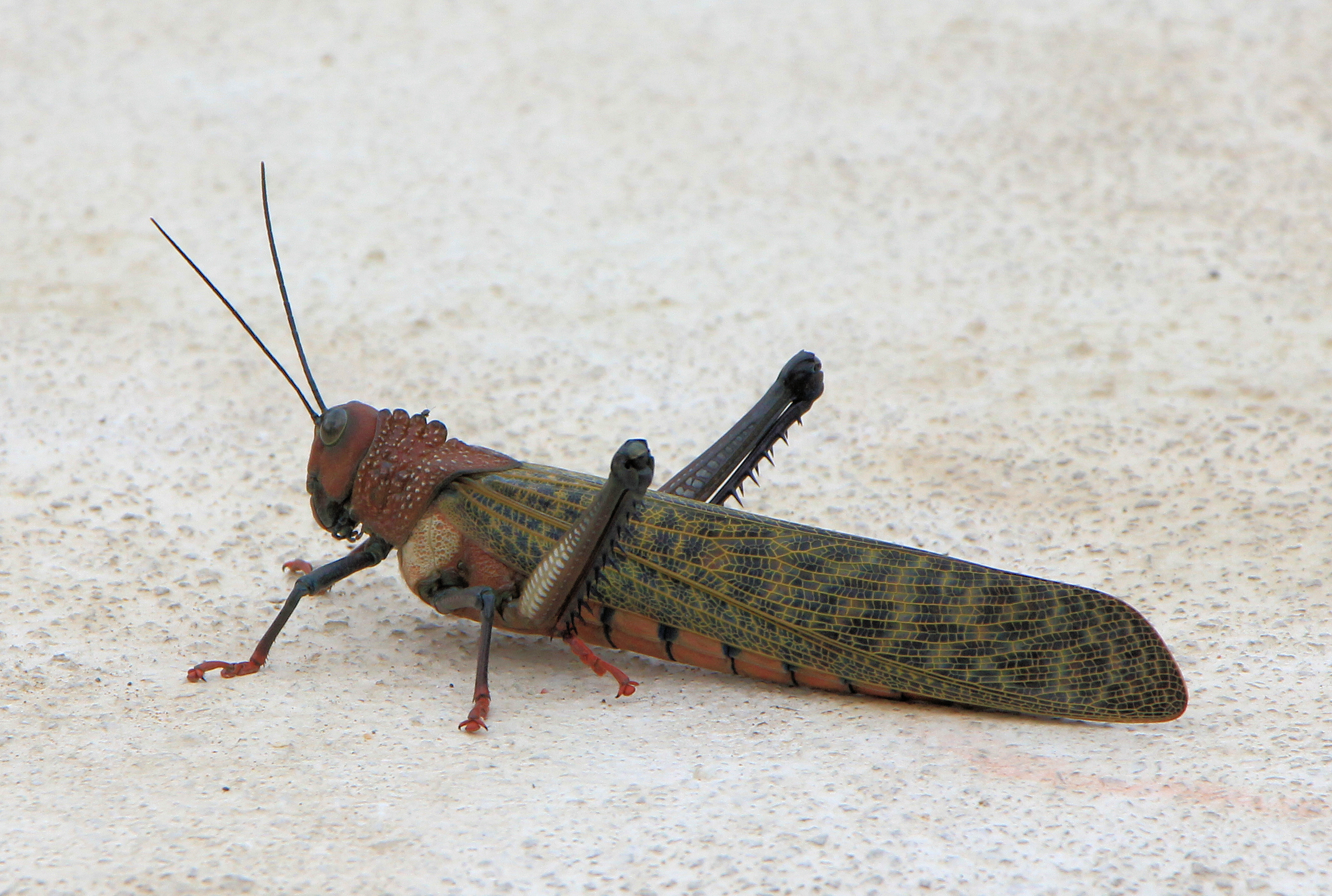

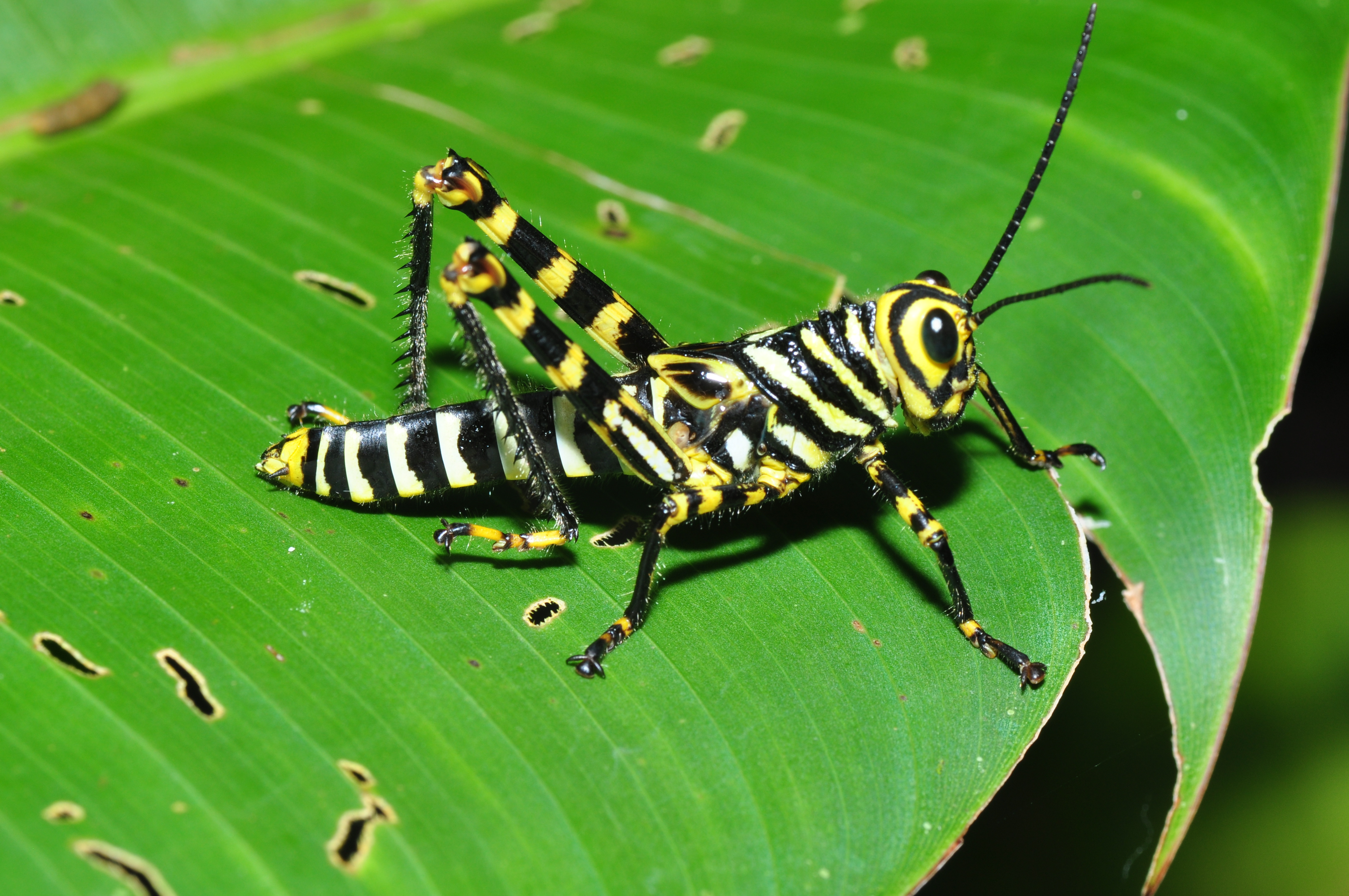
- Adult above, nymph below (both in Costa Rica)

Scientific classification
- Kingdom: Animalia
- Phylum: Arthropoda
- Class: Insecta
- Order: Orthoptera
- Suborder: Caelifera
- Family: Romaleidae
- Subfamily: Romaleinae
- Tribe: Tropidacrini
- Genus: Tropidacris
- Species: T. cristata

Binomial name
- Tropidacris cristata (Linnaeus, 1758)

Synonyms
- Tropidacris latreillei (Perty, 1832)

= Tropidacris cristata =

Species of grasshopper

Tropidacris cristata, the giant red-winged grasshopper, is a widespread species of lubber grasshopper in the family Romaleidae from tropical South and Central America, and Mexico. It is among the largest grasshoppers in the world by length and wingspan, reaching up to 14.5 cm (5.7 in) and 24 cm (9.4 in) respectively. More typical adult lengths are 5.5–7 cm (2.2–2.8 in), average 6.5 cm (2.6 in), in males and 7–12 cm (2.8–4.7 in), average 11 cm (4.3 in), in females. As suggested by the common name, adult T. cristata have conspicuously red wings in flight, although the exact red hue varies. The flightless and gregarious nymphs have aposematic dark-and-yellow stripes and are presumed to be toxic.

T. cristata occurs in a wide range of habitats, both in lowlands and highlands. In the southern part of its distribution, it is largely restricted to humid and semi-humid forested regions, avoiding places that are open and dry, but in the northern part it also occurs in somewhat drier habitats. It is generally quite common, although the blue-winged T. collaris often is more common where their ranges overlap in South America (only T. cristata is found in some parts of northwestern South America and in Central America).

T. cristata feeds on many types of plants and occasionally it is regarded as a pest. The lifecycle is annual with overlapping generations, but in some regions there is a level of seasonality in the occurrence of adults and nymphs. The female lays an egg sac that contains up to 100 eggs in the soil.

== Subspecies ==
There are three subspecies of Tropidacris cristata:

- Tropidacris cristata cristata (Linnaeus, 1758) – central and northern South America (west of the Andes south to Ecuador, east of the Andes south to the Cerrado region), southern Central America (Costa Rica and Panama), and Trinidad and Tobago
- Tropidacris cristata dux (Drury, 1770) – Mexico and Central America (south to Nicaragua)
- Tropidacris cristata grandis (Thunberg, 1824) – south-central South America (northernmost Argentina, Uruguay, easternmost Paraguay, and southern and southeastern Brazil; a few records from the Amazon, which typically is inhabited by T. c. cristata)
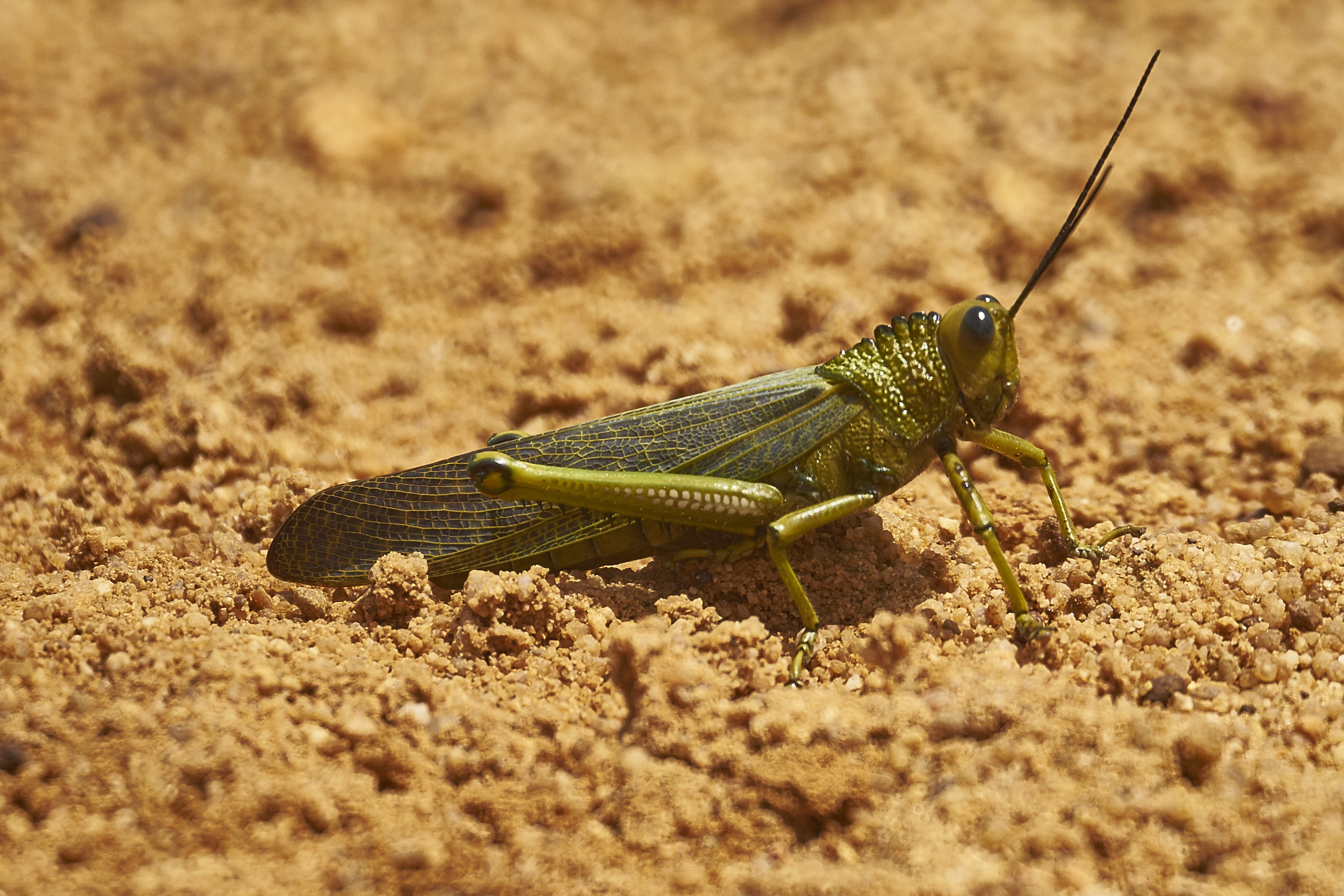
All three subspecies vary in colors, but T. c. dux commonly is quite yellowish

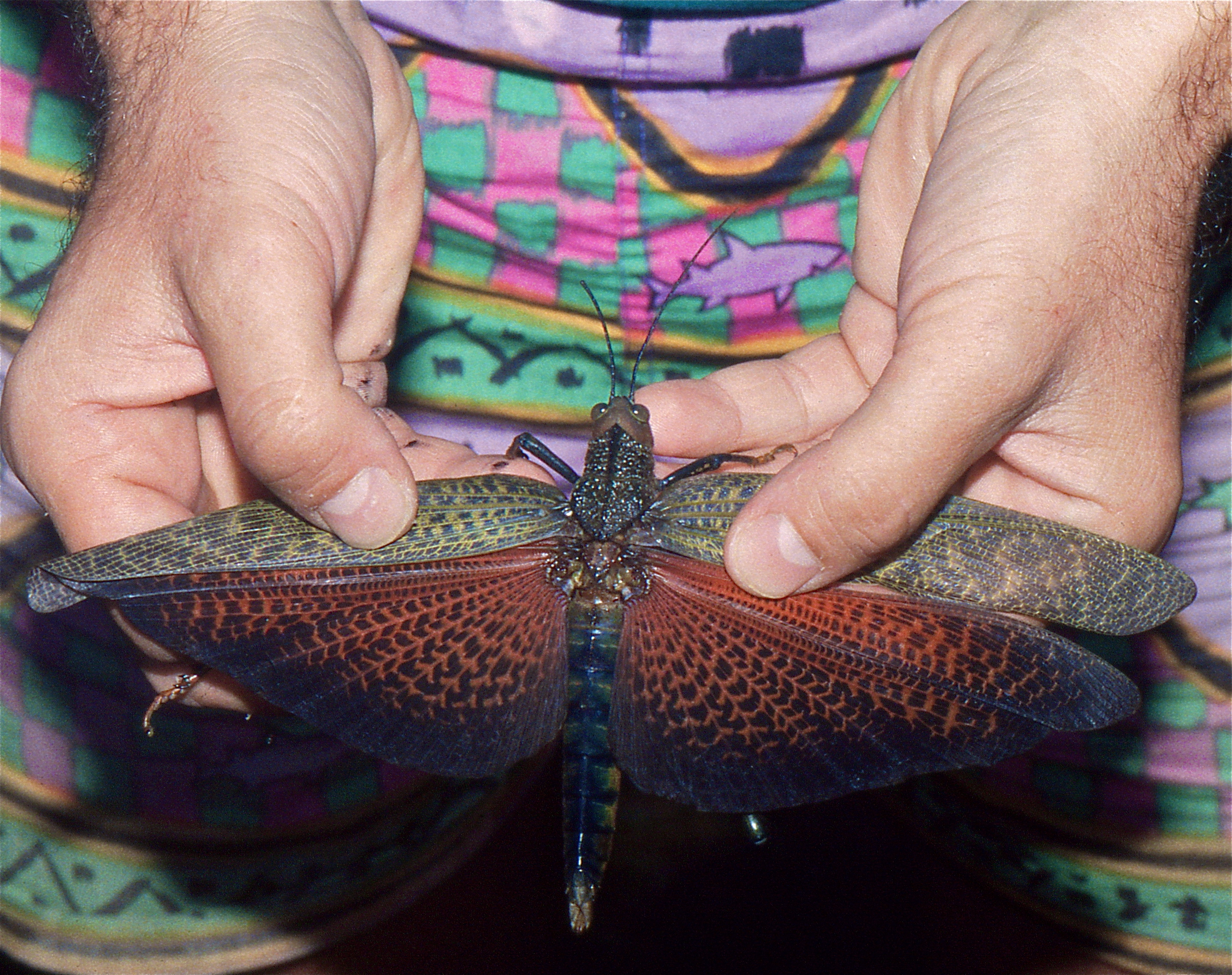
The red wings typical of this species
