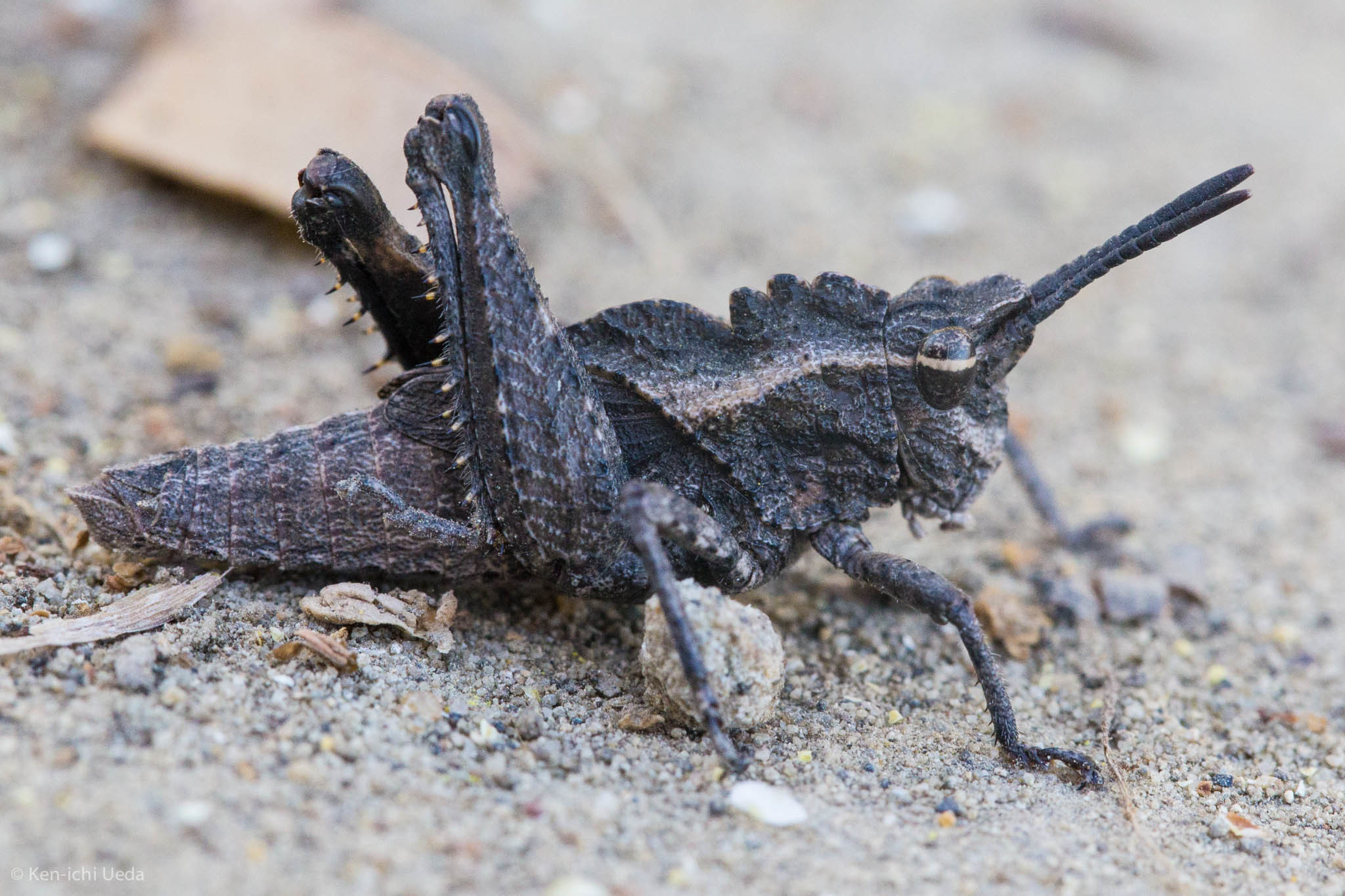

Scientific classification
- Domain: Eukaryota
- Kingdom: Animalia
- Phylum: Arthropoda
- Class: Insecta
- Order: Orthoptera
- Suborder: Caelifera
- Family: Romaleidae
- Subfamily: Romaleinae
- Genus: Dracotettix
- Species: D. monstrosus

Binomial name
- Dracotettix monstrosus Bruner, 1889

= Dracotettix monstrosus =

Species of grasshopper

Dracotettix monstrosus, the gray dragon lubber, is a species of lubber grasshopper in the family Romaleidae. It is found in North America.
