= Legua =

Scientific classification
- Kingdom: Animalia
- Phylum: Arthropoda
- Class: Insecta
- Order: Orthoptera
- Suborder: Caelifera
- Family: Romaleidae
- Subfamily: Romaleinae
- Tribe: Leguini
- Genus: Legua; Walker, 1870

Species
- Legua crenulata Stoll, 1813; Legua rosea Amédégnato & Poulain, 1986

Genus of grasshoppers

Legua is a genus of grasshoppers in the subfamily Romaleinae; described by Walker in 1870.
