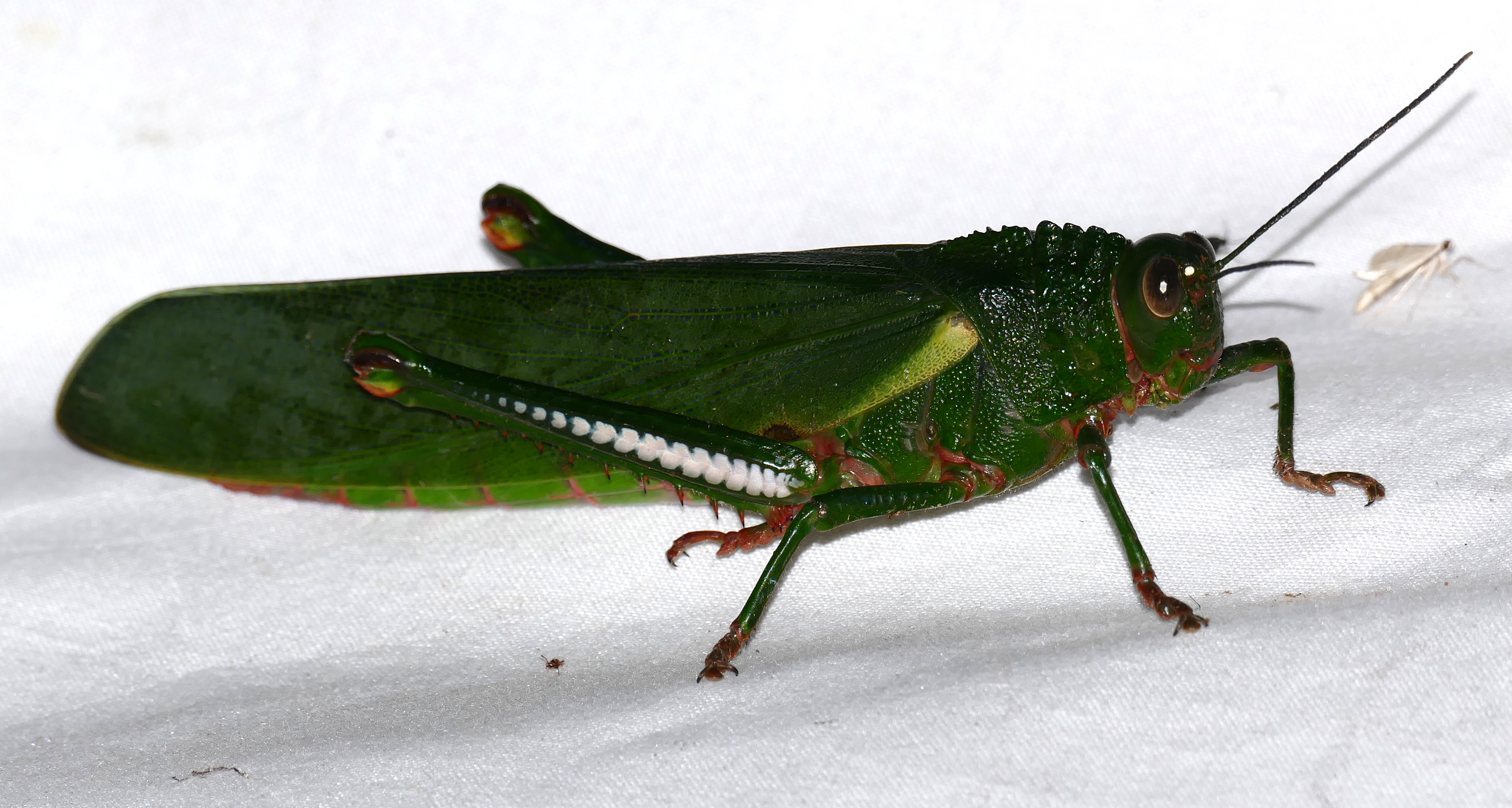

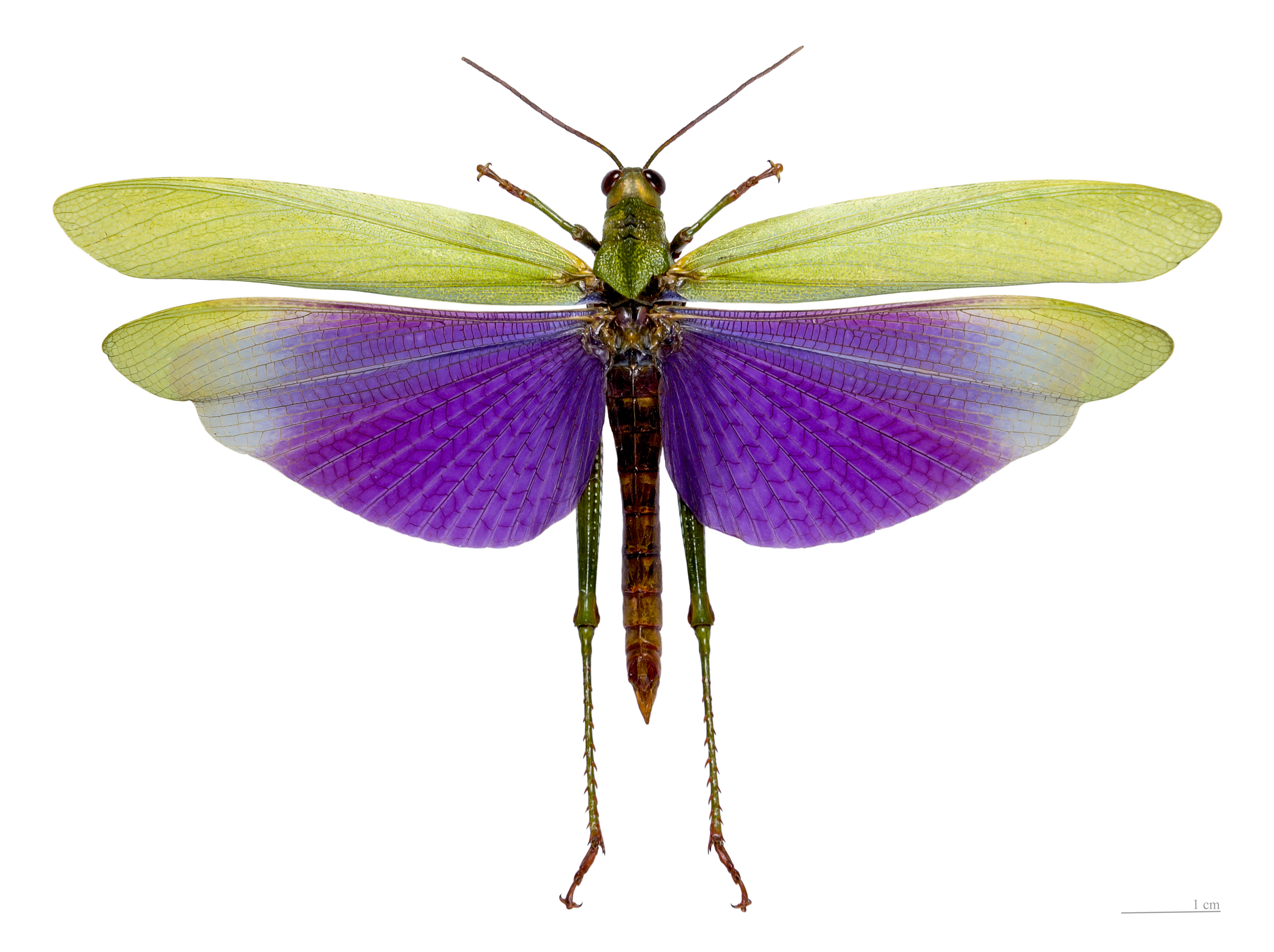
- In French Guiana above, museum specimen below

Scientific classification
- Domain: Eukaryota
- Kingdom: Animalia
- Phylum: Arthropoda
- Class: Insecta
- Order: Orthoptera
- Suborder: Caelifera
- Family: Romaleidae
- Subfamily: Romaleinae
- Tribe: Tropidacrini
- Genus: Titanacris
- Species: T. albipes

Binomial name
- Titanacris albipes (De Geer, 1773)

= Titanacris albipes =

Species of grasshopper

Titanacris albipes, the purple-winged grasshopper, is a large species of South American grasshopper in the family Romaleidae. This species lives in the canopy of the Amazon rainforest and also extends into the Cerrado region in gallery forest. It is often attracted to artificial light during the night.

Adult males are generally 6.5–8 cm (2.6–3.1 in) long and females 9.5–11 cm (3.7–4.3 in) long. Both sexes are primarily deep green and most of their wings are uniformly purple, which is conspicuous in flight and separates them from all other Titanacris species that have extensive red, orange-red or pink to their wings.
