= Spaniacris deserticola =

Conservation status
- Conservation Dependent (IUCN 2.3)

Scientific classification
- Kingdom: Animalia
- Phylum: Arthropoda
- Class: Insecta
- Order: Orthoptera
- Suborder: Caelifera
- Family: Romaleidae
- Genus: Spaniacris
- Species: S. deserticola

Binomial name
- Spaniacris deserticola Hebard, 1937

Species of grasshopper

Spaniacris deserticola is a species of grasshopper in the family Romaleidae known as the Coachella Valley grasshopper and spanistic desert grasshopper. It is known from a few locations in the deserts of southern California and just across the border in Sonora, Mexico.
