= Phrynotettix robustus =

Scientific classification
- Domain: Eukaryota
- Kingdom: Animalia
- Phylum: Arthropoda
- Class: Insecta
- Order: Orthoptera
- Suborder: Caelifera
- Family: Romaleidae
- Genus: Phrynotettix
- Species: P. robustus

Binomial name
- Phrynotettix robustus (Bruner, 1889)

Species of grasshopper

Phrynotettix robustus, known generally as the robust toad lubber or robust toad hopper, is a species of lubber grasshopper in the family Romaleidae. It is found in North America.

== Subspecies ==
These three subspecies belong to the species Phrynotettix robustus:

- Phrynotettix robustus manicola Rehn and Grant, 1959
- Phrynotettix robustus occultus Rehn and Grant, 1959
- Phrynotettix robustus robustus (Bruner, 1889)
