= Phrynotettix tshivavensis =

Scientific classification
- Domain: Eukaryota
- Kingdom: Animalia
- Phylum: Arthropoda
- Class: Insecta
- Order: Orthoptera
- Suborder: Caelifera
- Family: Romaleidae
- Genus: Phrynotettix
- Species: P. tshivavensis

Binomial name
- Phrynotettix tshivavensis (Haldeman, 1852)

Species of grasshopper

Phrynotettix tshivavensis, known generally as the Chihuahua lubber or Chihuahua toad hopper, is a species of lubber grasshopper in the family Romaleidae. It is found in North America.

== Subspecies ==
These five subspecies belong to the species Phrynotettix tshivavensis:

- Phrynotettix tshivavensis magnus (Thomas, 1875)^{i c g}
- Phrynotettix tshivavensis pusillus Rehn and Grant, 1959^{i c g}
- Phrynotettix tshivavensis taosanus Rehn, 1902^{i c g}
- Phrynotettix tshivavensis tshivavensis (Haldeman, 1852)^{i c g}
- Phrynotettix tshivavensis verruculatus Glover, 1872^{i c g}

Data sources: i = ITIS, c = Catalogue of Life, g = GBIF, b = Bugguide.net
