= Quitus =

Scientific classification
- Domain: Eukaryota
- Kingdom: Animalia
- Phylum: Arthropoda
- Class: Insecta
- Order: Orthoptera
- Suborder: Caelifera
- Family: Romaleidae
- Subfamily: Romaleinae
- Genus: Quitus; Hebard, 1924

Genus of insects

Quitus is a genus of grasshoppers in the subfamily Romaleinae; described by Hebard in 1924.

== Species ==
- Quitus insolens Hebard, 1924 - type species
- Quitus podocarpus Amédégnato & Poulain, 1994
- Quitus zurucucho Amédégnato & Poulain, 1994
