= Costarica =

Scientific classification
- Domain: Eukaryota
- Kingdom: Animalia
- Phylum: Arthropoda
- Class: Insecta
- Order: Orthoptera
- Suborder: Caelifera
- Family: Romaleidae
- Subfamily: Romaleinae
- Tribe: Phaeopariini
- Genus: Costarica; Koçak & Kemal, 2008
- Species: C. costaricensis

Binomial name
- Costarica costaricensis (Carbonell, 2002)

Synonyms
- Genus synonymy: Rowellia Carbonell, 2002; Species synonymy: Rowellia costaricensis Carbonell, 2002

Genus of grasshoppers

Costarica is a genus of grasshoppers in the subfamily Romaleinae; described by Koçak & Kemal in 2008. Its only species is Costarica costaricensis.
