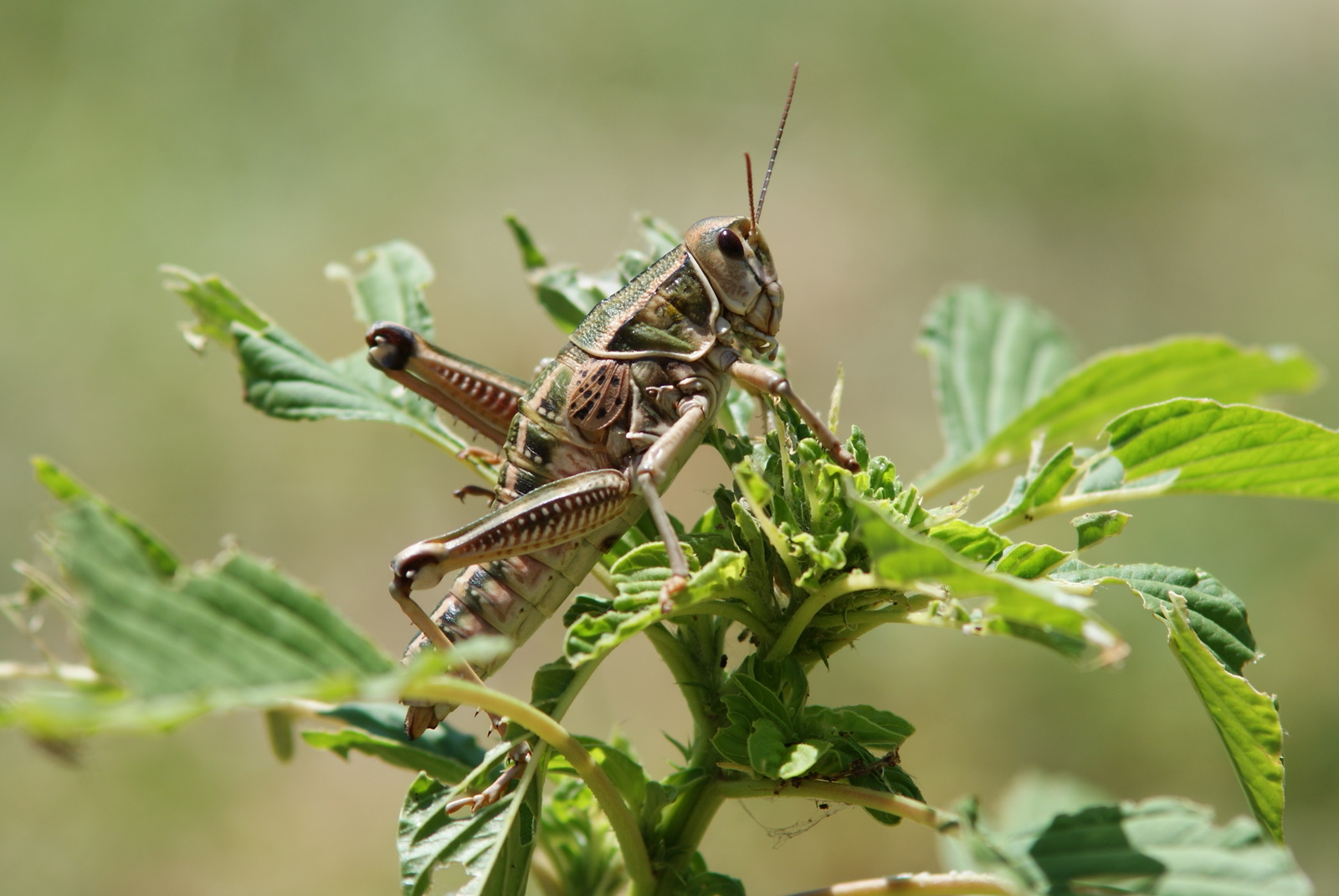

Scientific classification
- Domain: Eukaryota
- Kingdom: Animalia
- Phylum: Arthropoda
- Class: Insecta
- Order: Orthoptera
- Suborder: Caelifera
- Family: Romaleidae
- Genus: Brachystola
- Species: B. magna

Binomial name
- Brachystola magna (Girard, 1854)

= Brachystola magna =

Species of grasshopper

Brachystola magna, the plains lubber grasshopper, western lubber grasshopper or homesteader, is a large species of grasshopper in the family Romaleidae, native to open and semi-open habitats of central and southern United States and northern Mexico.

Adults are typically 4–6 cm (1.6–2.4 in) long, with females growing larger than males. It is reddish brown with black dots on its outer wings, however there is some variation in coloration, with more northern variants tending to be greener, and southern ones more brownish-buff. Brachystola magna has extremely small wings and is unable to fly. The antennae are bluish-brown and the legs are reddish near the body with purple tarsi. It has a ridge along the upper and middle region of the abdomen. It is distinguished from Brachystola virescens by its longer antennae and color.

In Wyoming it is found on gravelly ground in the southwest of the state. It does not cause significant damage to crops, and seems to prefer coarse broadleaved plants to crops. It overwinters in the egg, which hatch in the spring and reach adulthood in August.

Walter Sutton's description of reduction division was based on studying the spermatocytes of Brachystola magna. This work was critical in the development of the chromosome theory of inheritance.
