= Spaniacris =

Scientific classification
- Domain: Eukaryota
- Kingdom: Animalia
- Phylum: Arthropoda
- Class: Insecta
- Order: Orthoptera
- Suborder: Caelifera
- Family: Romaleidae
- Subfamily: Romaleinae
- Genus: Spaniacris; Hebard, 1937

Genus of grasshoppers

Spaniacris is a genus of spanistic desert grasshoppers in the family Romaleidae. There is at least one described species in Spaniacris, S. deserticola.
