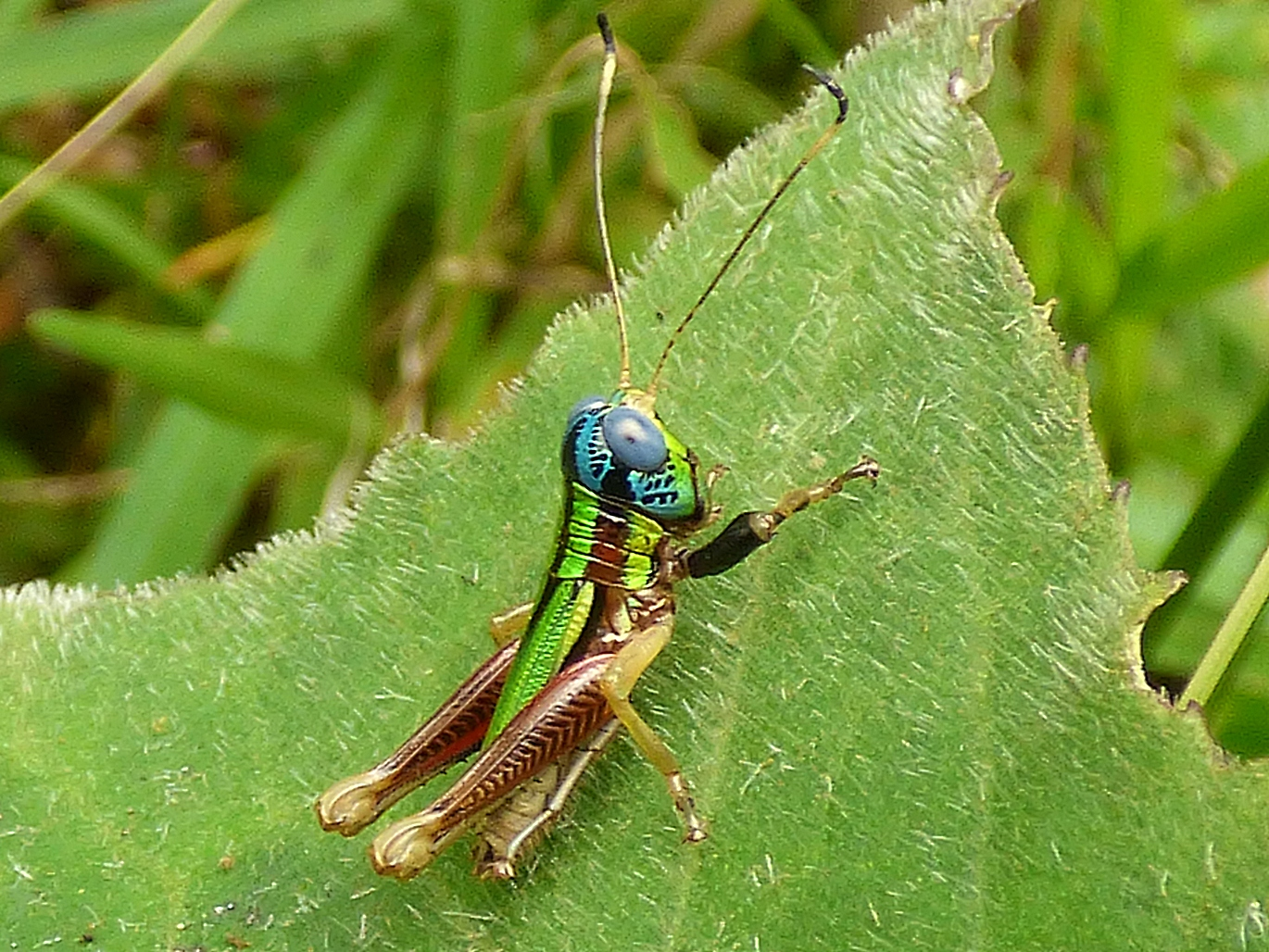
- Megacheilacris vallensis

Scientific classification
- Domain: Eukaryota
- Kingdom: Animalia
- Phylum: Arthropoda
- Class: Insecta
- Order: Orthoptera
- Suborder: Caelifera
- Superfamily: Acridoidea
- Family: Romaleidae
- Subfamily: Bactrophorinae
- Genus: Megacheilacris; Descamps, 1978

= Megacheilacris =

Genus of grasshoppers

Megacheilacris is a genus of grasshopper, in the tribe Taeniophorini, found in Central and South America.

== Species ==
The Orthoptera Species File lists:

- Megacheilacris bullifemur Descamps & Amédégnato, 1971
  - type species (as Megacephalacris bullifemur = M. bullifemur bullifemur)
- Megacheilacris graminicola Descamps & Amédégnato, 1971
- Megacheilacris megacephala Bruner, 1907
- Megacheilacris vallensis (Descamps & Amédégnato, 1971)
