= Abila (grasshopper) =

Scientific classification
- Kingdom: Animalia
- Phylum: Arthropoda
- Class: Insecta
- Order: Orthoptera
- Suborder: Caelifera
- Family: Romaleidae
- Tribe: Phaeopariini
- Genus: Abila; Stål, 1878

Synonyms
- Homalosaparus Rehn, 1908

Genus of grasshoppers

Abila is a genus of lubber grasshoppers in the family Acrididae. They occur in South America.

== Species ==
These four species belong to the genus Abila:

- Abila bolivari Giglio-Tos, 1900
- Abila christianeae Carbonell, 2002
- Abila descampsi Carbonell, 2002
- Abila latipes Stål, 1878
