= Tytthotyle =

Scientific classification
- Domain: Eukaryota
- Kingdom: Animalia
- Phylum: Arthropoda
- Class: Insecta
- Order: Orthoptera
- Suborder: Caelifera
- Family: Romaleidae
- Subfamily: Romaleinae
- Genus: Tytthotyle; Scudder, 1897
- Species: T. maculata

Binomial name
- Tytthotyle maculata (Bruner, 1889)

Genus of grasshoppers

Tytthotyle is a genus of furnace heat lubbers in the family Romaleidae. There is at least one described species in Tytthotyle, T. maculata.
