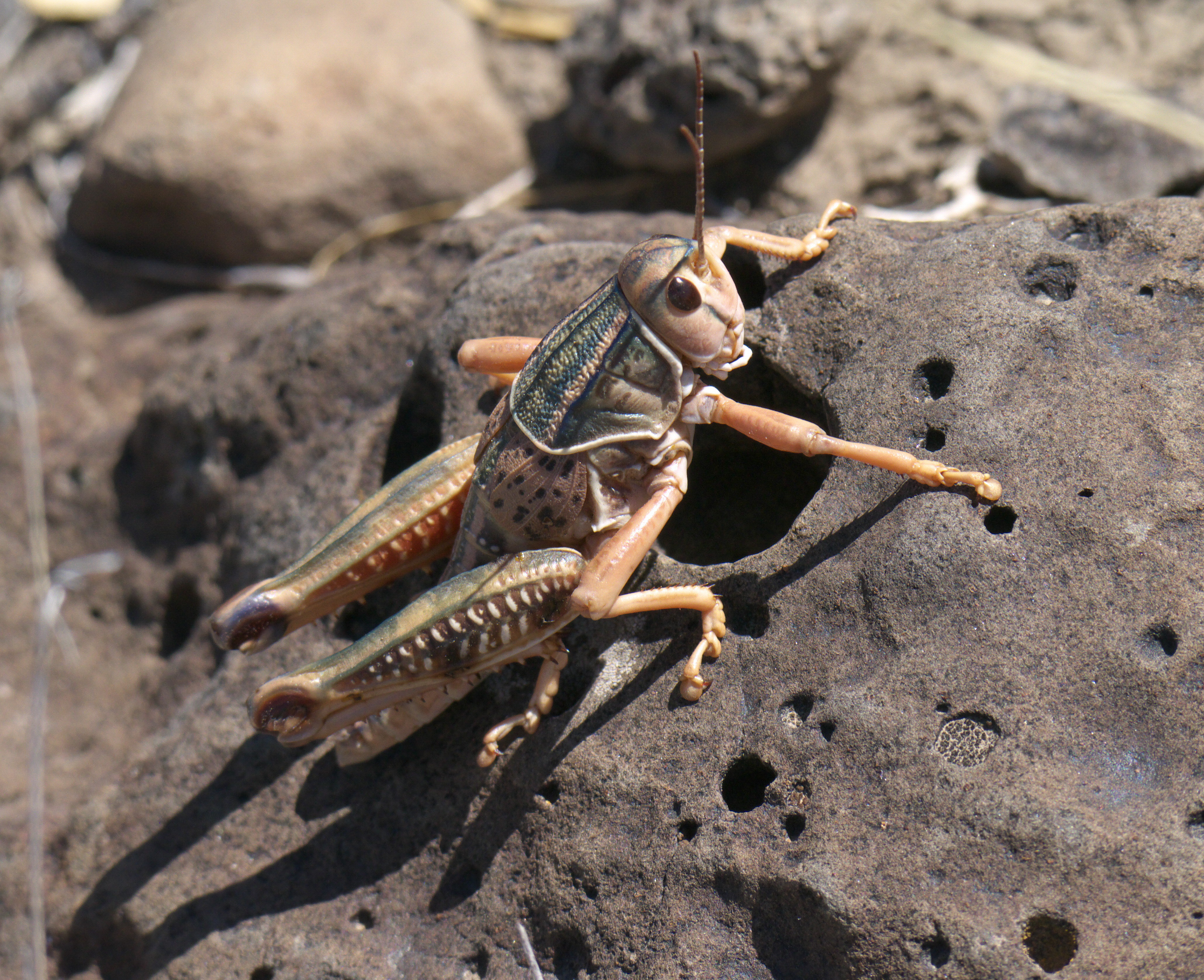
- Brachystola magna

Scientific classification
- Domain: Eukaryota
- Kingdom: Animalia
- Phylum: Arthropoda
- Class: Insecta
- Order: Orthoptera
- Suborder: Caelifera
- Family: Romaleidae
- Subfamily: Romaleinae
- Tribe: Romaleini
- Genus: Brachystola; Scudder, 1876

= Brachystola =

Genus of grasshoppers

Brachystola is a genus of grassland lubber grasshoppers in the family Romaleidae, found in the United States and Mexico. They are among the largest grasshoppers found in North America. The species Brachystola magna has meiotic chromosomes that are relatively large and easily visible, and was used in early genetic studies.

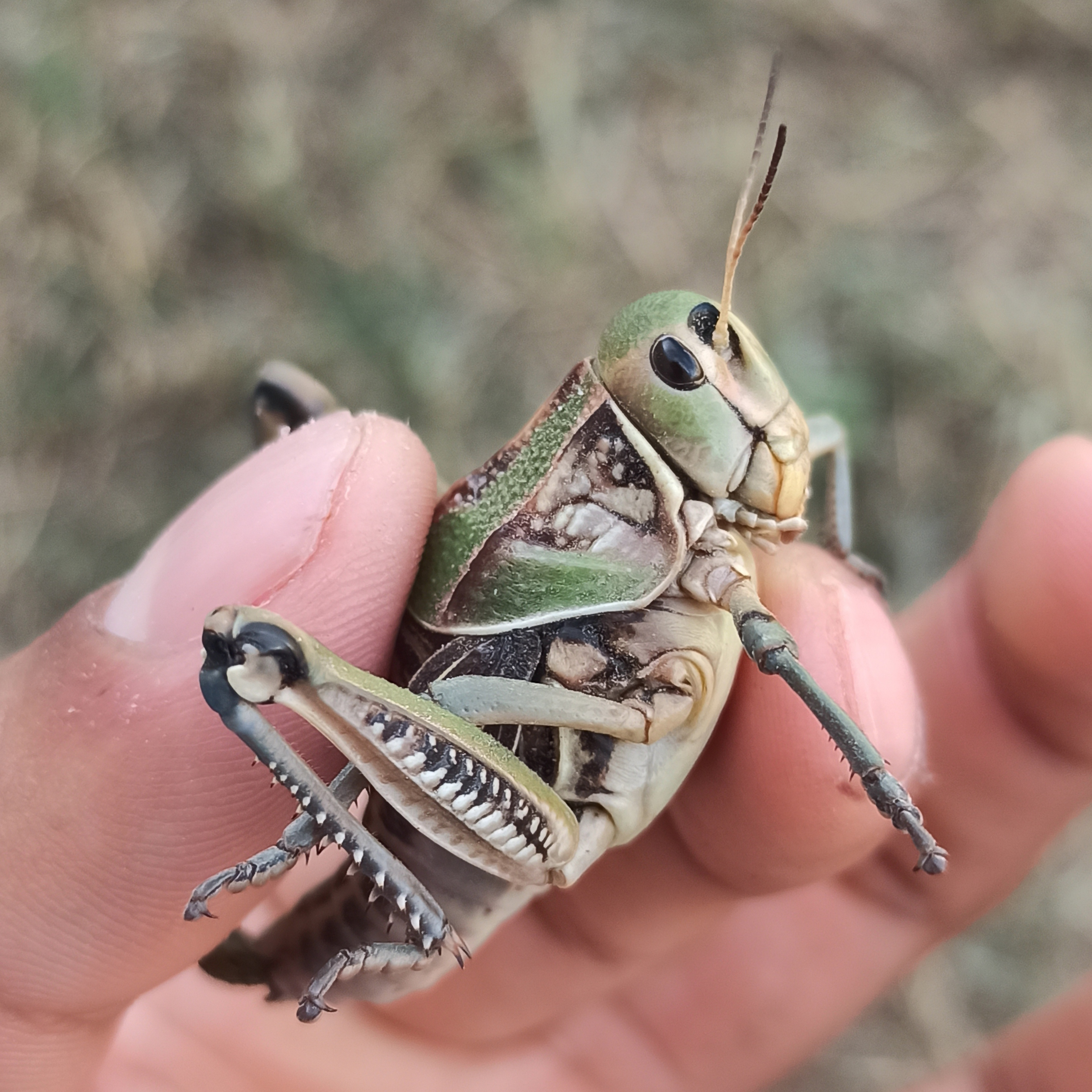
Brachystola mexicana

== Species ==
These six species belong to the genus Brachystola:

- Brachystola behrensii Scudder, 1877
- Brachystola eiseni Bruner, 1906
- Brachystola magna (Girard, 1853) (plains lubber grasshopper)
- Brachystola mexicana Bruner, 1904
- Brachystola ponderosa Bruner, 1906
- Brachystola virescens (Charpentier, 1845)
