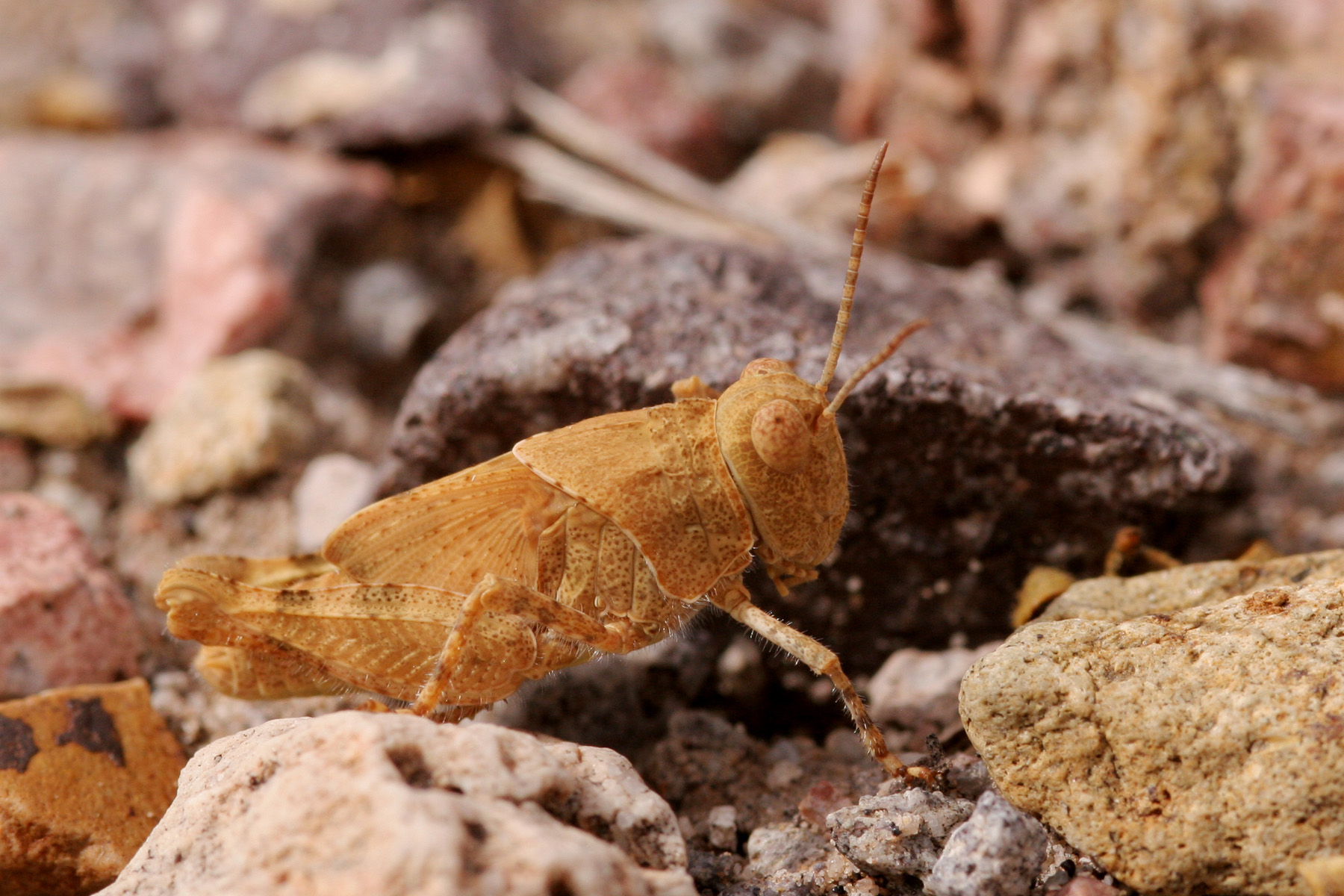
- Phrynotettix sp.

Scientific classification
- Domain: Eukaryota
- Kingdom: Animalia
- Phylum: Arthropoda
- Class: Insecta
- Order: Orthoptera
- Suborder: Caelifera
- Family: Romaleidae
- Subfamily: Romaleinae
- Genus: Phrynotettix; Glover, 1872

= Phrynotettix =

Genus of grasshoppers

Phrynotettix is a genus of toad lubbers in the family Romaleidae. There are at least three described species in Phrynotettix.

== Species ==
These three species belong to the genus Phrynotettix:

- Phrynotettix robertsi Rehn, J.A.G. & H.J. Grant Jr., 1959
- Phrynotettix robustus (Bruner, 1889) (robust toad lubber)
- Phrynotettix tshivavensis (Haldeman, 1852) (Chihuahua lubber)
