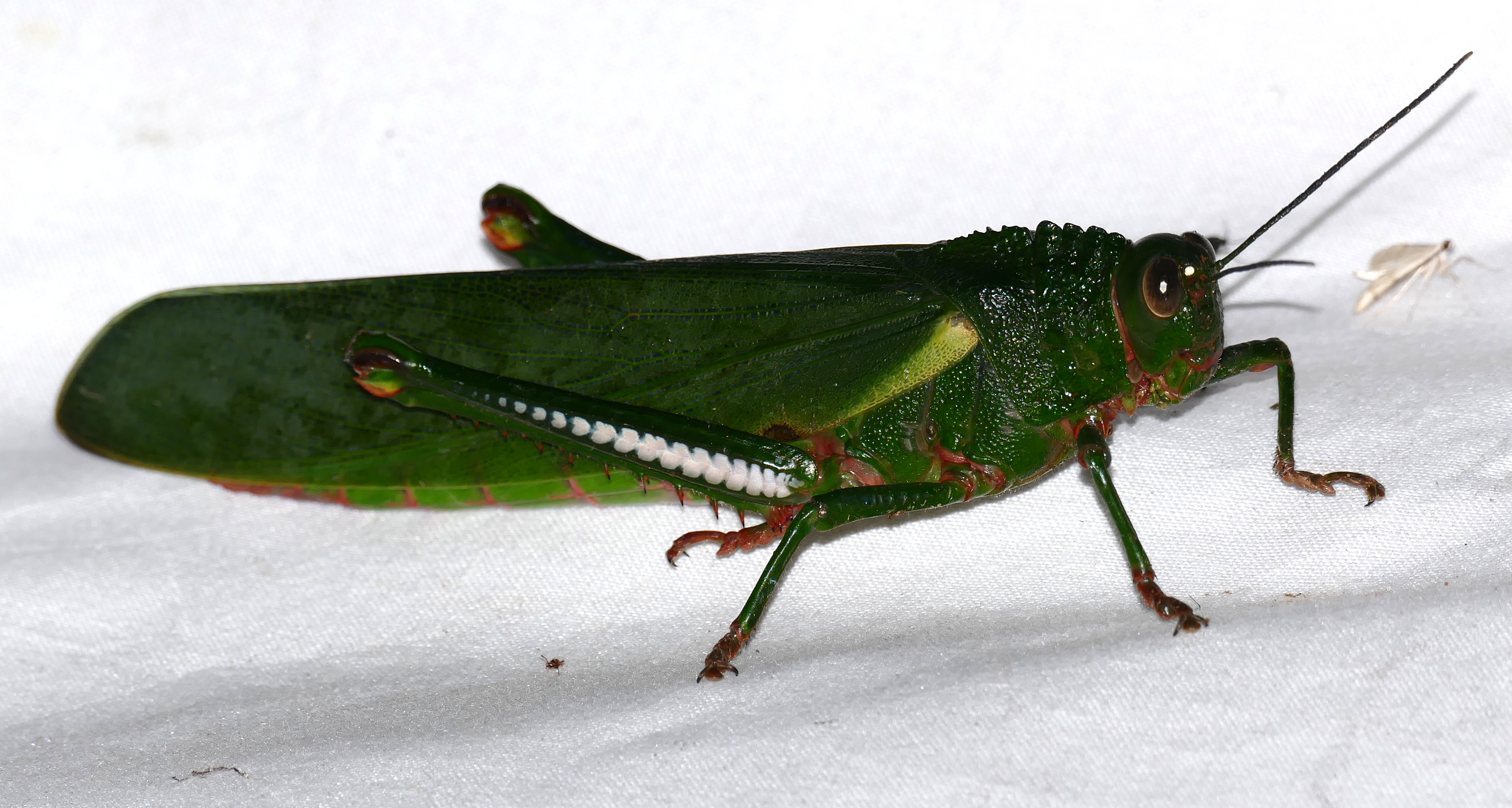
- Titanacris albipes

Scientific classification
- Domain: Eukaryota
- Kingdom: Animalia
- Phylum: Arthropoda
- Class: Insecta
- Order: Orthoptera
- Suborder: Caelifera
- Family: Romaleidae
- Subfamily: Romaleinae
- Tribe: Tropidacrini
- Genus: Titanacris; Scudder, 1869

Synonyms
- Lophacris Scudder, 1869

= Titanacris =

Genus of grasshoppers

Titanacris is a genus of large grasshoppers in the subfamily Romaleinae and tribe Tropidacrini. They are found from southeastern Mexico, through Central and South America, ranging south to northernmost Argentina.

Adult males are generally 5–9 cm (2.0–3.5 in) long and females 7–13 cm (2.8–5.1 in) long, but they are quite poorly known because they live high in the canopy of tropical forests, they are excellent fliers (not easily caught), and only T. albipes and T. velazquezii appear to regularly be attracted to artificial light at night. They are mostly green, but in flight they have conspicuously violet, red, orange-red or pink wings; their wings lack the dark rear edge and spotting seen in the closely related Tropidacris. The shape of the female's ovipositor indicates that the eggs are deposited in the soil, similar to the better-known Tropidacris.

== Taxonomy ==
Titanacris and the closely related to Tropidacris form the tribe Tropidacrini, but the latter genus is generally better known.

There are seven recognized species in the genus Titanacris:

1. Titanacris albipes (De Geer, 1773) - type species (as Acrydium albipes De Geer, by subsequent designation)
2. Titanacris gloriosa (Hebard, 1924)
3. Titanacris humboldtii (Scudder, 1869)
4. Titanacris olfersii (Burmeister, 1838)
5. Titanacris ornatifemur Descamps & Carbonell, 1985
6. Titanacris picticrus (Descamps, 1978)
7. Titanacris velazquezii (Nieto, 1857)

The type of Titanacris is T. albipes, a rather aberrant species compared to the remaining species, which sometimes have been placed in a separate genus, Lophacris, instead.

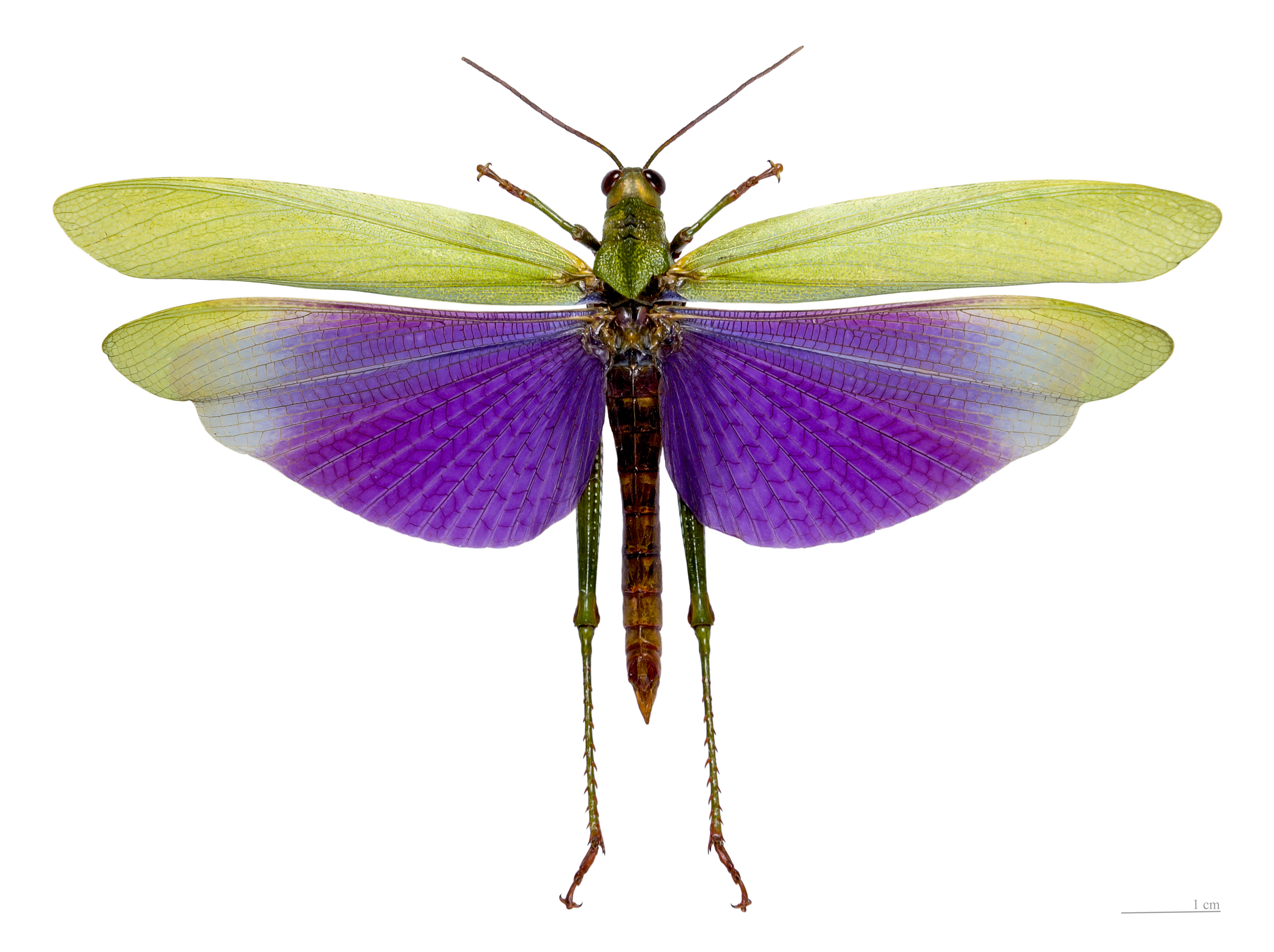
Titanacris albipes

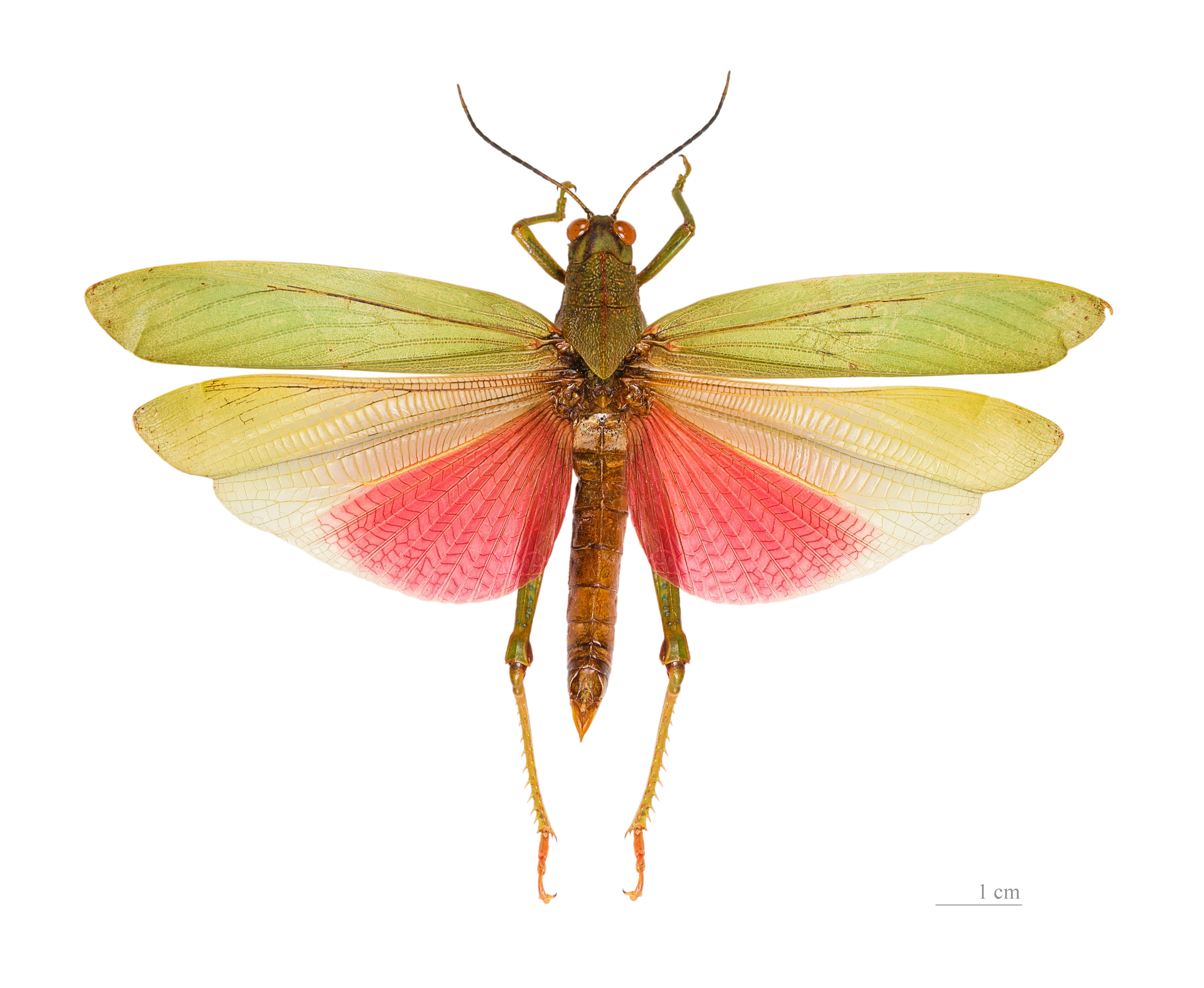
Titanacris picticrus
