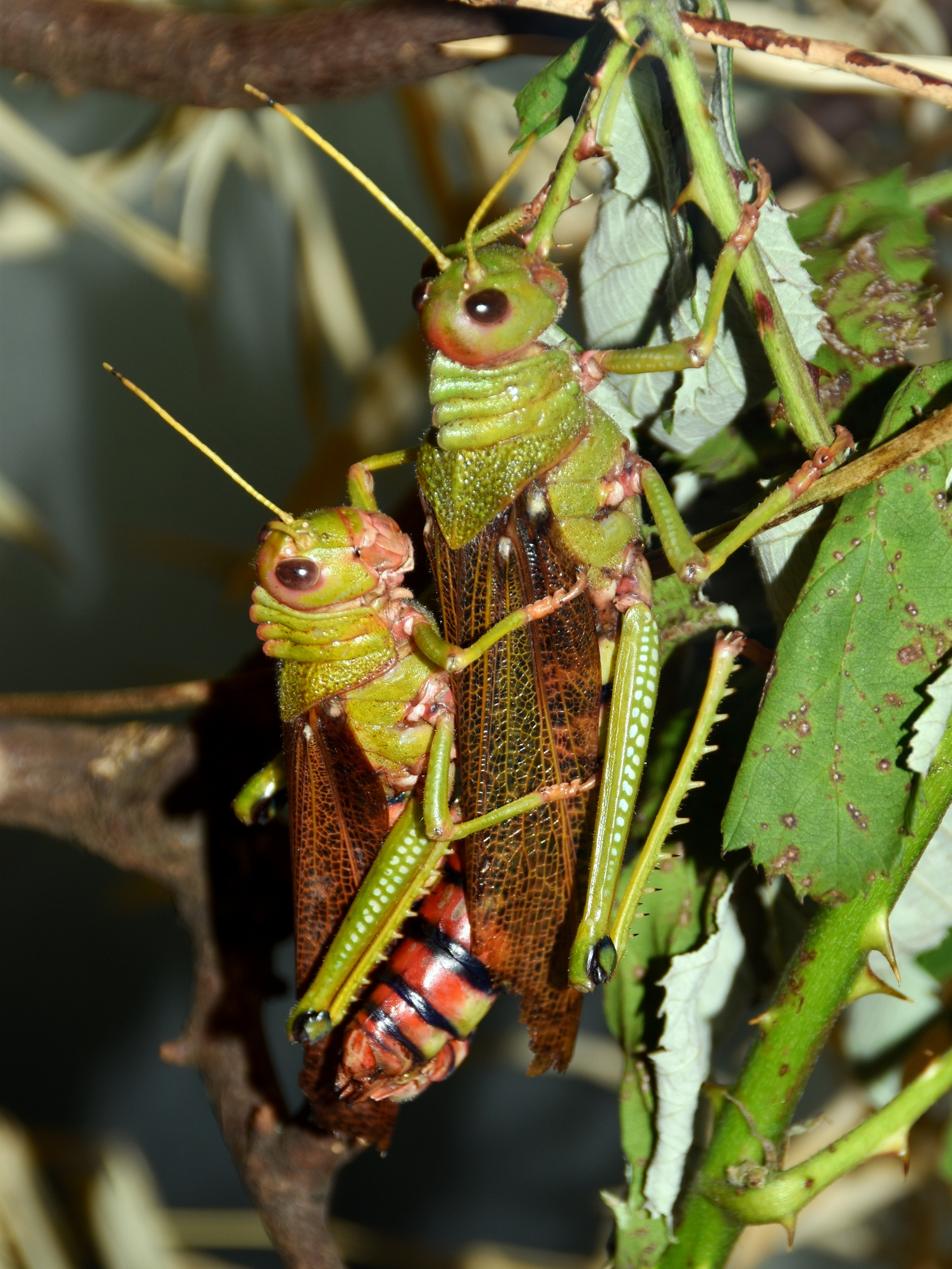
- Tropidacris collaris, mating pair

Scientific classification
- Kingdom: Animalia
- Phylum: Arthropoda
- Class: Insecta
- Order: Orthoptera
- Suborder: Caelifera
- Family: Romaleidae
- Subfamily: Romaleinae
- Tribe: Tropidacrini
- Genus: Tropidacris; Scudder, 1869

Synonyms
- Eutropidacris (Hebard, 1923)

= Tropidacris =

Genus of grasshoppers

Tropidacris is a Neotropical genus of grasshopper in the family Romaleidae. They are among the largest grasshoppers in the world by length and wingspan, reaching up to 14.5 cm (5.7 in) and 24 cm (9.4 in) respectively. They are variably colored in green, brown, black, reddish or yellowish, and have wings that usually are conspicuously blue (T. collaris and T. descampsi) or red (T. cristatus) in flight. The gregarious and flightless nymphs have bright aposematic colors and are presumed to be toxic; a researcher who tasted one noted that it was very bitter, similar to a monarch butterfly.

These locally abundant grasshoppers inhabit a wide range of habitats, from rainforests to dry open areas and lowlands to highlands. Both adults and nymphs feed on many types of plants and decaying matter, and (especially A. collaris) are sometimes regarded as pests because of the considerable damage they may cause to agricultural crops, tree plantations and ornamental plants.

== Taxonomy ==
Tropidacris and the closely related Titanacris form the tribe Tropidacrini, but the latter genus, which generally is restricted to forest canopies of South and Central America, is not as well known. Unlike Tropidacris, adult Titanacris are always mostly green (only some Tropidacris are mostly green) and have colorful wings that lack dark rear edge and spotting.

There are three recognized species in the genus Tropidacris:

- Tropidacris collaris (Stoll, 1813) – blue-winged grasshopper or violet-winged grasshopper
- Tropidacris cristata (Linnaeus, 1758) – giant red-winged grasshopper
- Tropidacris descampsi Carbonell, 1986

Several additional species have been described, but these are now regarded as synonyms of the widespread and well-known T. collaris or T. cristata. T. descampsi is poorly known with only a few confirmed specimens from the Colombian Amazon and western Brazilian Amazon.

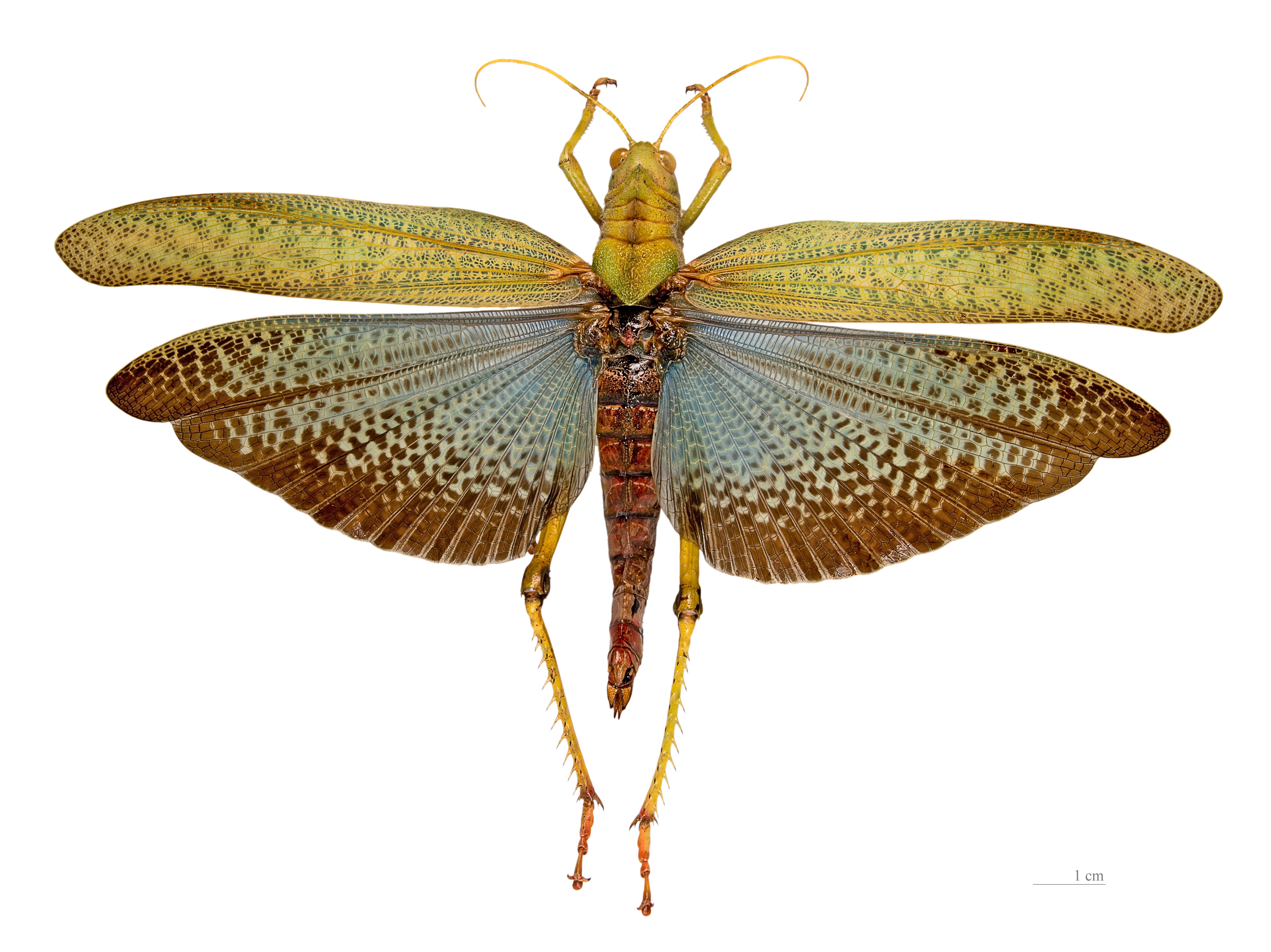
Tropidacris collaris

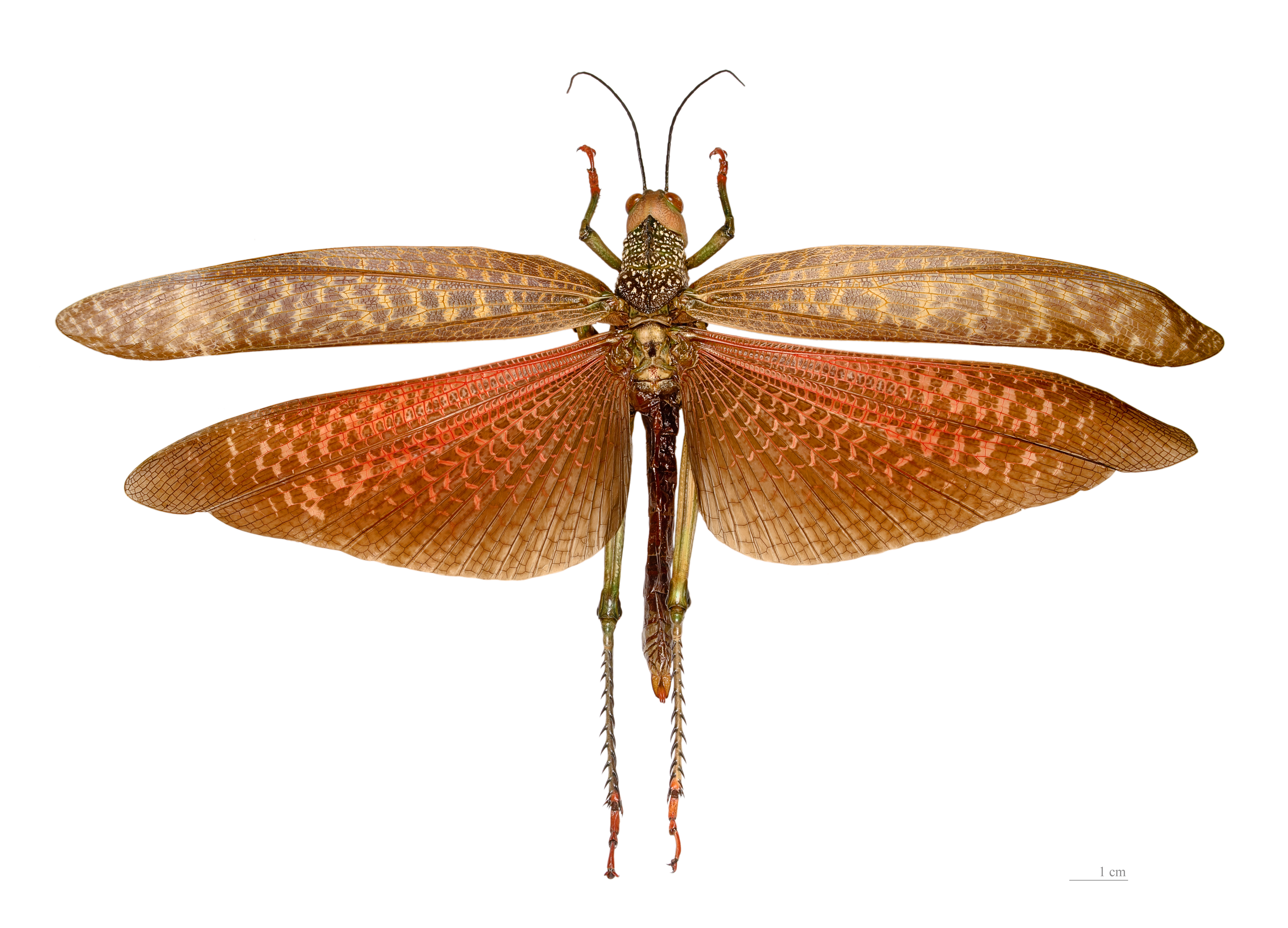
Tropidacris cristata
