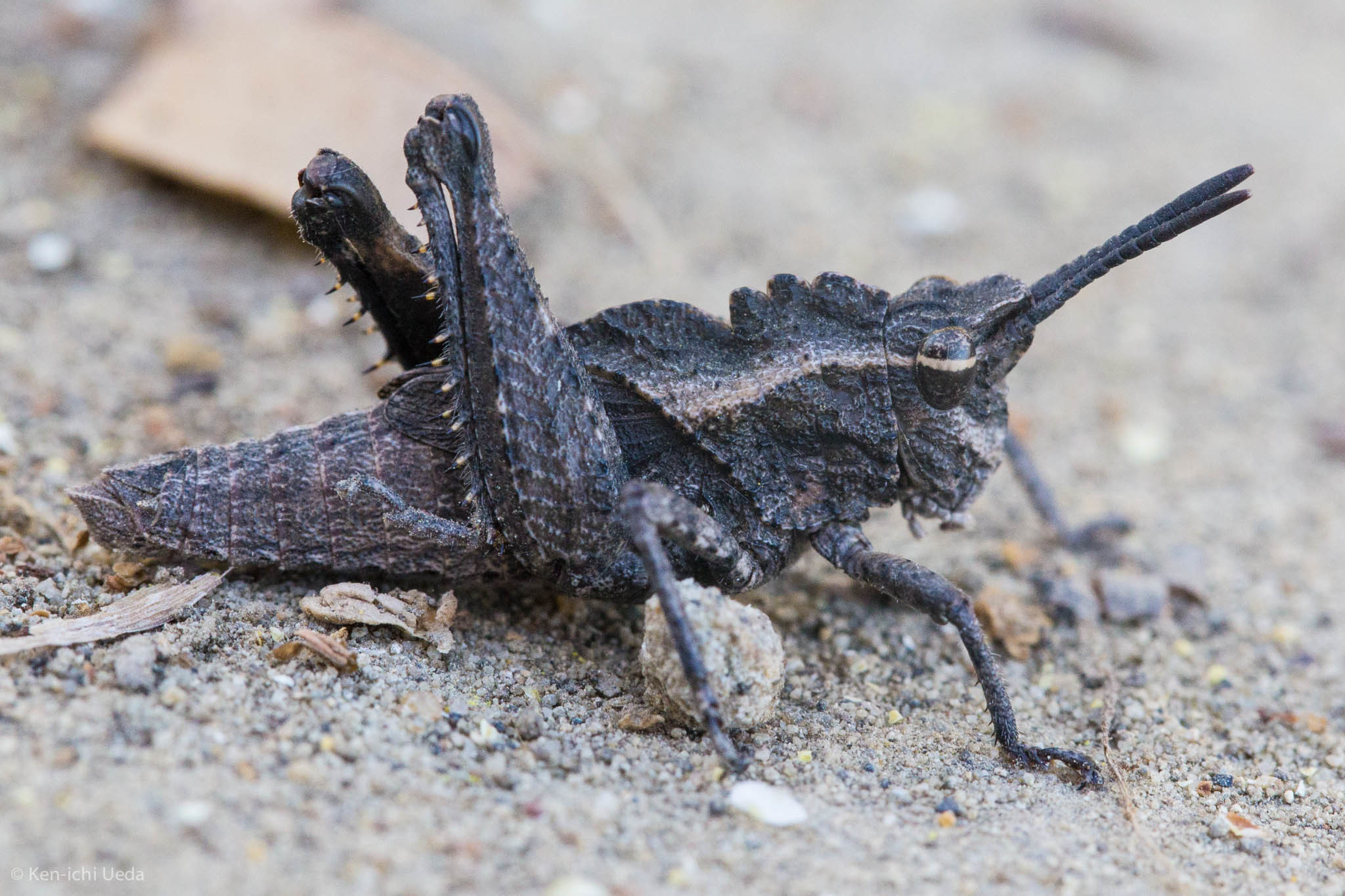
- Dracotettix monstrosus

Scientific classification
- Domain: Eukaryota
- Kingdom: Animalia
- Phylum: Arthropoda
- Class: Insecta
- Order: Orthoptera
- Suborder: Caelifera
- Family: Romaleidae
- Subfamily: Romaleinae
- Genus: Dracotettix; Bruner, 1889

= Dracotettix =

Genus of grasshoppers

Dracotettix is a genus of dragon lubbers in the family Romaleidae. There are at least three described species in Dracotettix.

== Species ==
These three species belong to the genus Dracotettix:

- Dracotettix monstrosus Bruner, 1889 (gray dragon lubber)
- Dracotettix newboldi Hebard, 1931
- Dracotettix plutonius Bruner, 1893
