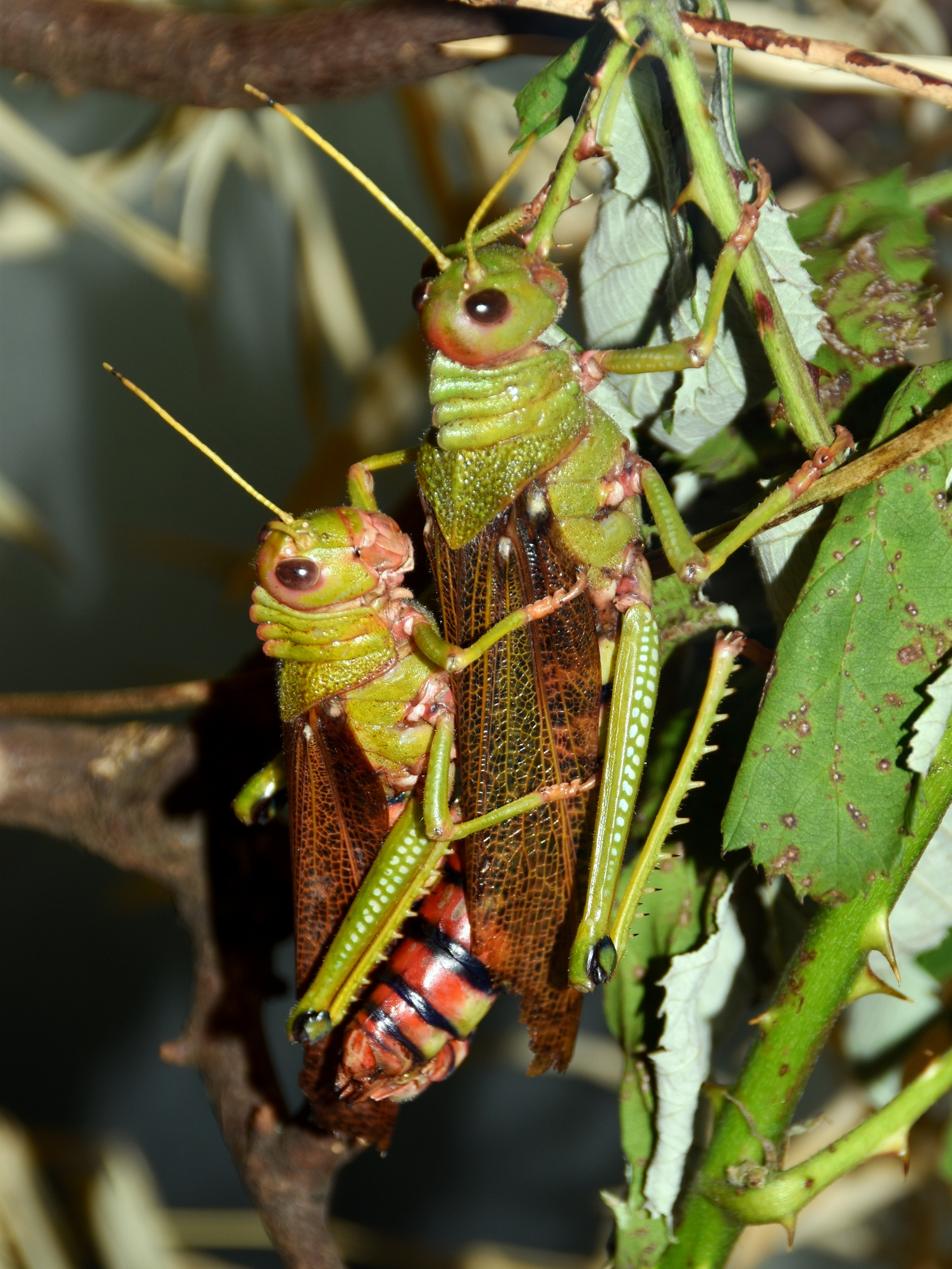

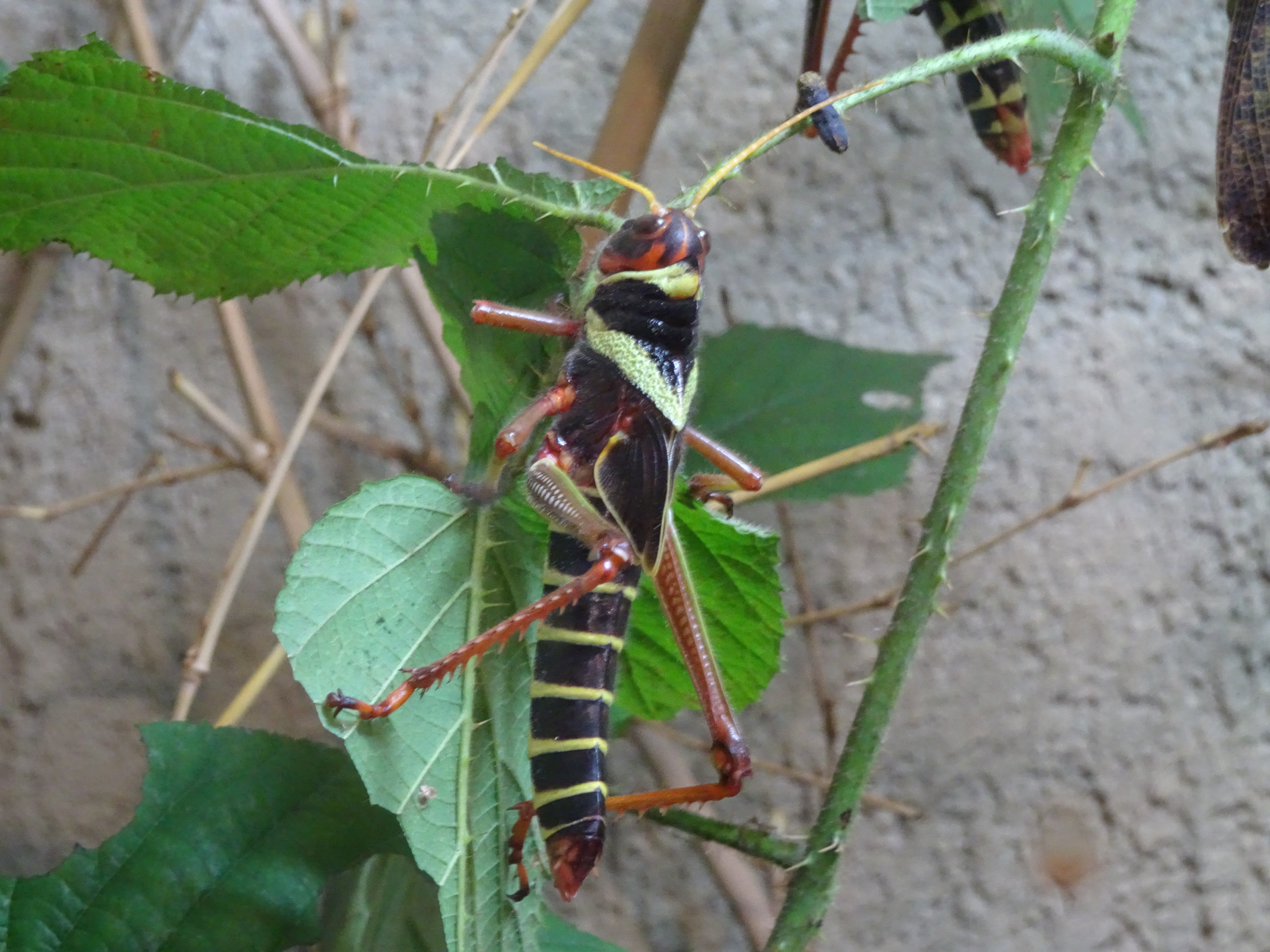
- Mating pair above, nymph below

Scientific classification
- Kingdom: Animalia
- Phylum: Arthropoda
- Class: Insecta
- Order: Orthoptera
- Suborder: Caelifera
- Family: Romaleidae
- Genus: Tropidacris
- Species: T. collaris

Binomial name
- Tropidacris collaris (Stoll, 1813)

= Tropidacris collaris =

Species of grasshopper

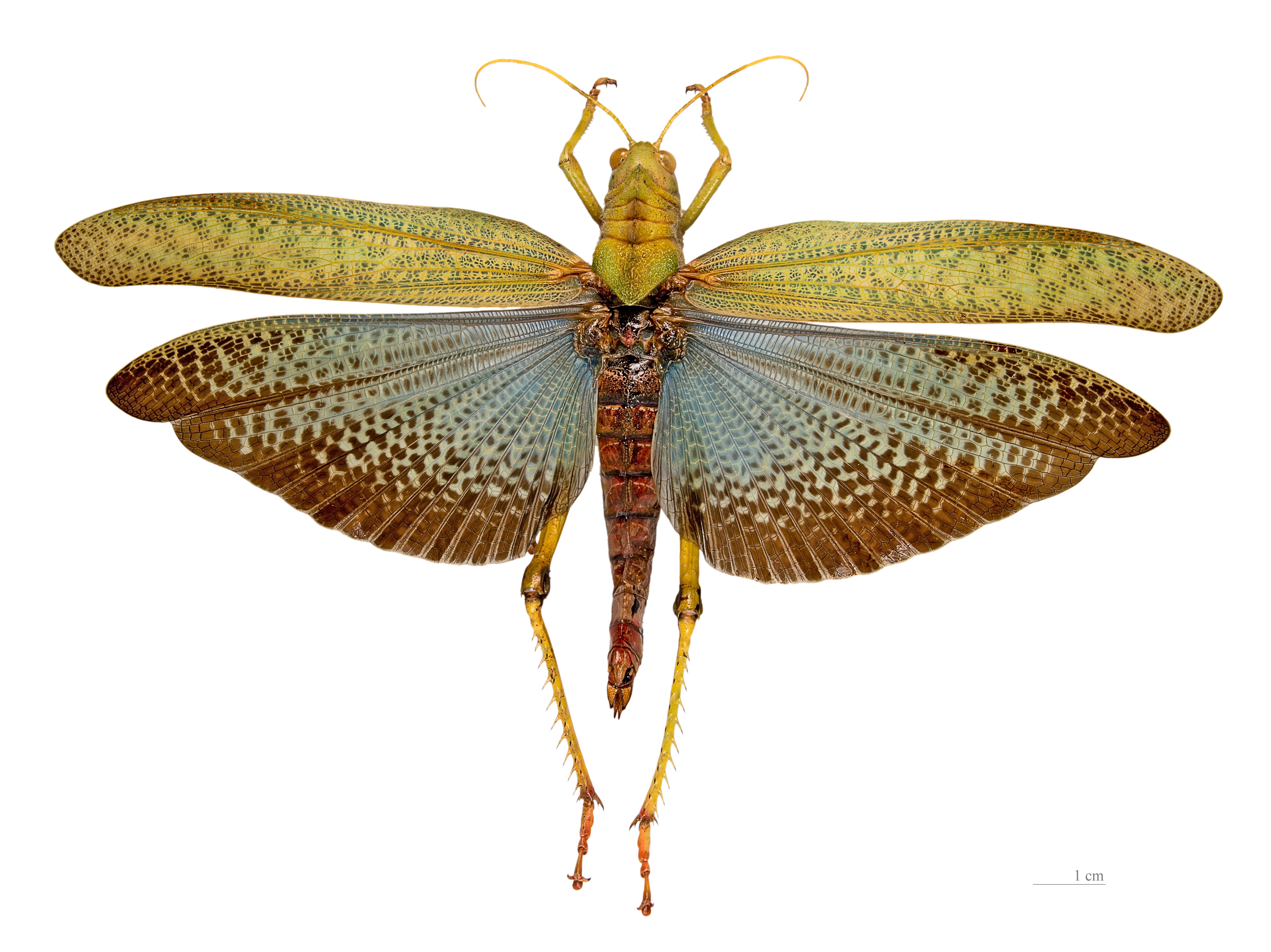
Specimen showing the typically blue wings of T. collaris

Tropidacris collaris, the blue-winged grasshopper or violet-winged grasshopper, is a large South American species of grasshopper in the family Romaleidae. As suggested by its name, in flight the wings are usually conspicuously blue, but they can occasionally be grayish or greenish. Adult males are typically 5–7 cm (2.0–2.8 in) long and females typically 8.5–10.5 cm (3.3–4.1 in) long; the wingspan is usually about 18 cm (7 in). The gregarious and flightless nymphs are aposematically colored in black, red and yellow and are presumed to be toxic; a researcher who tasted one noted, that it was very bitter, similar to a monarch butterfly.

Tropidacris collaris is common in a wide range of habitats from rainforests to dry open areas like Caatinga and Cerrado. It is widespread in South America east of the Andes, from Colombia and the Guianas to central Argentina, but generally avoiding highlands. They feed on many types of plants, including several species of agricultural crops, trees grown in plantations and ornamental plants, and they are considered a pest in some parts of their range. They are popular among insect and terrarium enthusiasts.

A grasshopper of this species was spotted landing on the arm of James Rodríguez, after he scored a goal during Colombia's 1–2 loss to Brazil, at the quarter-finals of the 2014 FIFA World Cup.
