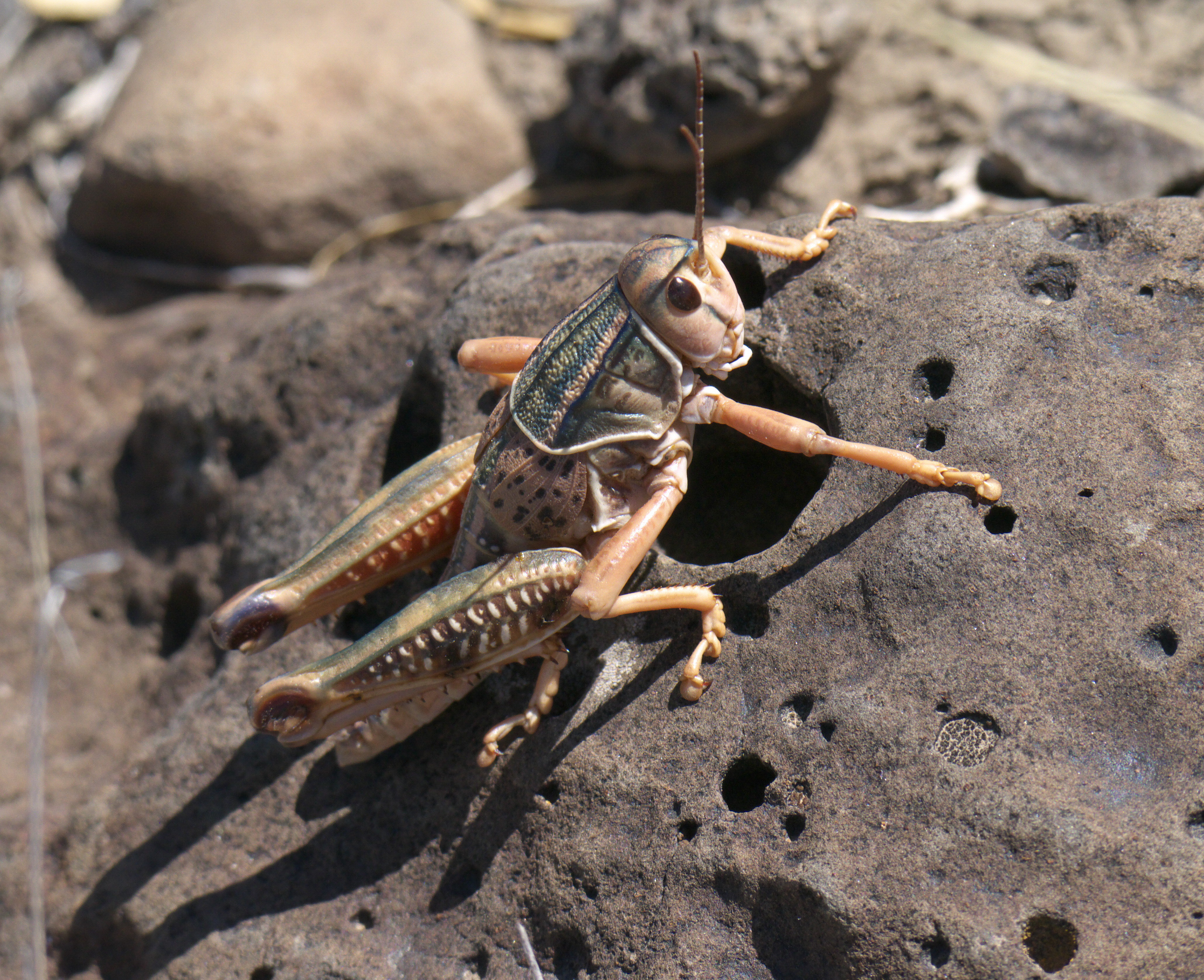
- Brachystola magna

Scientific classification
- Domain: Eukaryota
- Kingdom: Animalia
- Phylum: Arthropoda
- Class: Insecta
- Order: Orthoptera
- Suborder: Caelifera
- Family: Romaleidae
- Subfamily: Romaleinae; Pictet & Saussure, 1887

Tribes
- Chariacrini Rehn & Grant, 1959; Elaeochlorini Rehn & Grant, 1959; Eurostacrini Amédégnato, 1997; Hisychiini Descamps, 1979; Leguini Amédégnato & Poulain, 1986; Phaeopariini Giglio-Tos, 1898; Procolpini Giglio-Tos, 1898; Romaleini Pictet & Saussure, 1887; Tropidacrini Brunner von Wattenwyl, 1893; Trybliophorini Giglio-Tos, 1898

= Romaleinae =

Subfamily of grasshoppers

Romaleinae is a subfamily of lubber grasshoppers in the family Romaleidae, found in North and South America. More than 60 genera and 260 described species are placed in the Romaleinae.

== Tribes and genera ==
These tribes and genera belong to the subfamily Romaleinae:

=== Chariacrini ===
Auth: Rehn & Grant, 1959

1. Aprionacris Descamps, 1978
2. Chariacris Walker, 1870
3. Prionacris Stål, 1878

=== Elaeochlorini ===
Auth: Rehn & Grant, 1959

1. Agriacris Walker, 1870
2. Brasilacris Rehn, 1940
3. Cibotopteryx Rehn, 1905
4. Staleochlora Roberts & Carbonell, 1992

=== Eurostacrini ===
Auth: Amédégnato, 1997

1. Eurostacris Descamps, 1978
2. Pseudeurostacris Descamps, 1978

=== Hisychiini ===
Auth: Descamps, 1979

1. Acrideumerus Descamps, 1979
2. Acridophaea Descamps, 1979
3. Cloephoracris Descamps, 1979
4. Hisychius Stål, 1878
5. Pareusychius Amédégnato & Poulain, 1994
6. Porphoracris Descamps, 1979
7. Pseudhisychius Descamps, 1979

=== Leguini ===
Auth: Amédégnato & Poulain, 1986

1. Ampiacris Amédégnato & Poulain, 1986
2. Legua Walker, 1870
3. Proracris Uvarov, 1940

=== Phaeopariini ===
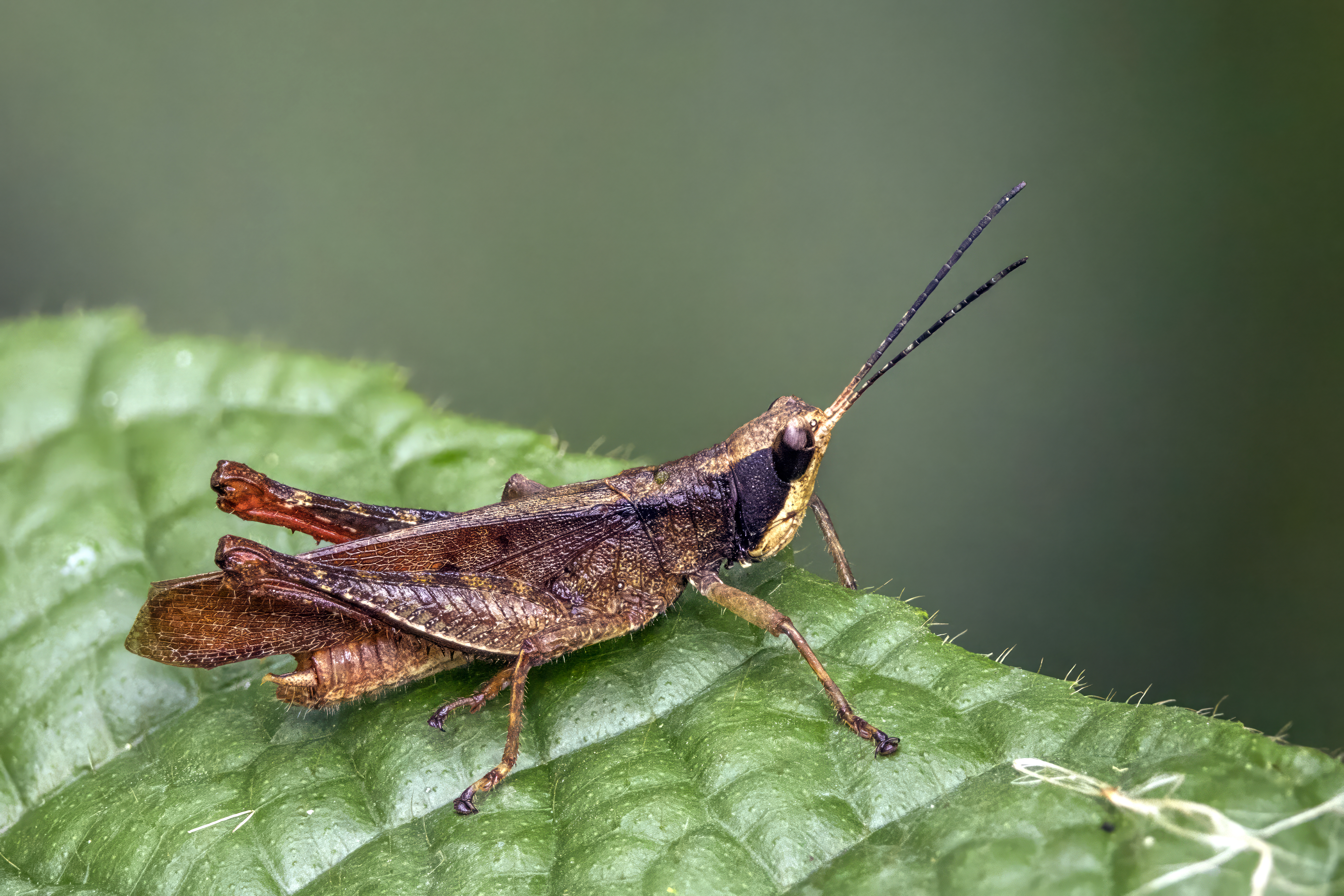
Pseudaristia oxycodia, Colombia

Auth: Giglio-Tos, 1898

1. Abila Stål, 1878
2. Albinella Carbonell, 2002
3. Aristia Stål, 1876
4. Costarica Koçak & Kemal, 2008
5. Epiprora Gerstaecker, 1889
6. Graciliparia Amédégnato & Poulain, 1994
7. Maculiparia Jago, 1980
8. Phaeoparia Stål, 1873
9. Pseudaristia Carbonell, 2002 (monotypic)
10. Stornophilacris Amédégnato & Descamps, 1978
11. Tepuiacris Carbonell, 2002

=== Procolpini ===
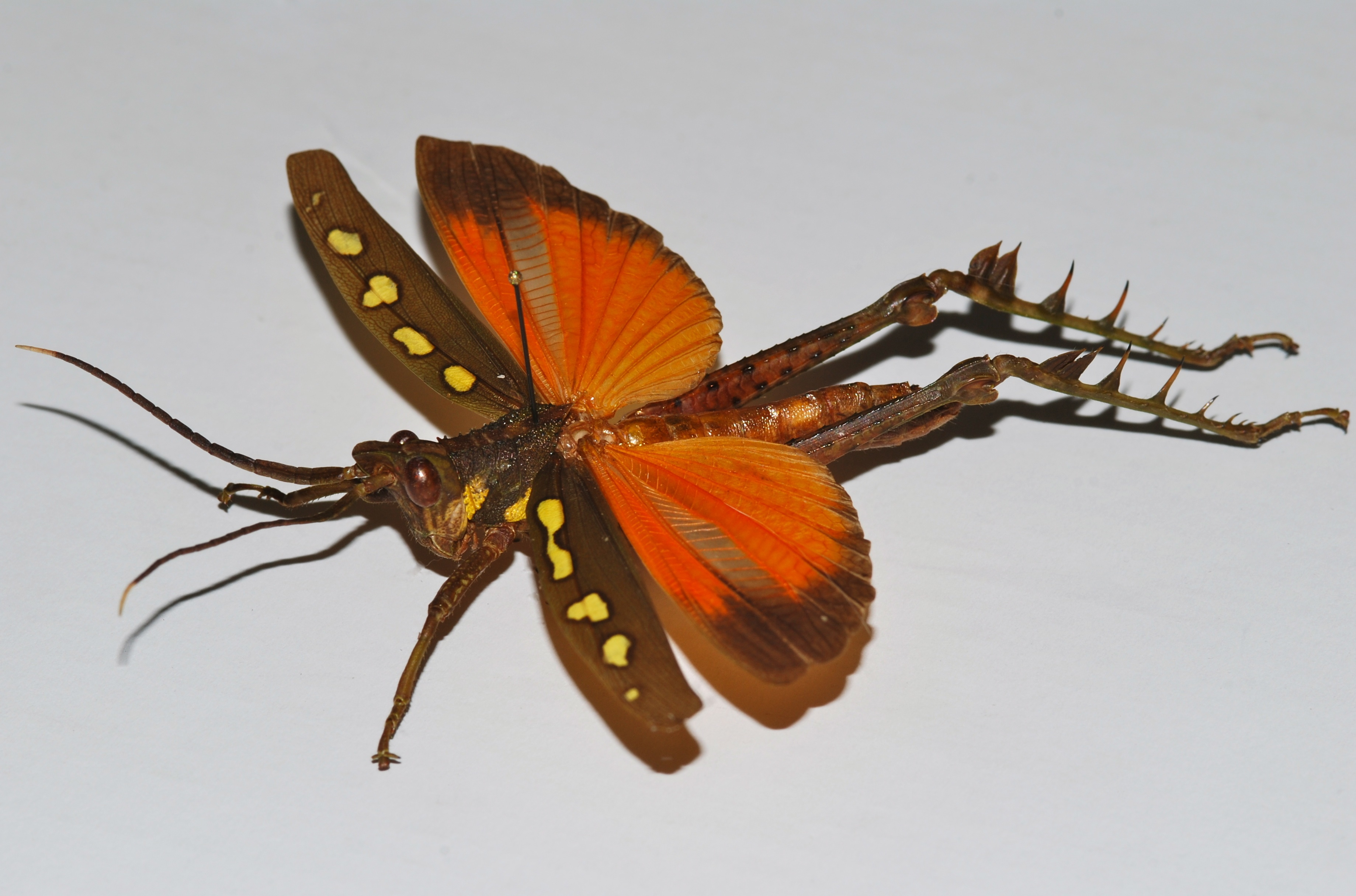
Aeolacris caternaulti

Auth: Giglio-Tos, 1898

subtribe Prionolophina Rehn & Grant, 1959

1. Alcamenes Stål, 1878
2. Colpolopha Stål, 1873
3. Draconata Pictet & Saussure, 1887
4. Helionotus Rehn, 1909
5. Prionolopha Stål, 1873
6. Securigera Bolívar, 1909
7. Xyleus Gistel, 1848

subtribe Procolpina Giglio-Tos, 1898

1. Aeolacris Scudder, 1875
2. Munatia Stål, 1875
3. Procolpia Stål, 1873
4. Prorhachis Scudder, 1875
5. Xomacris Rehn, 1955

=== Romaleini ===
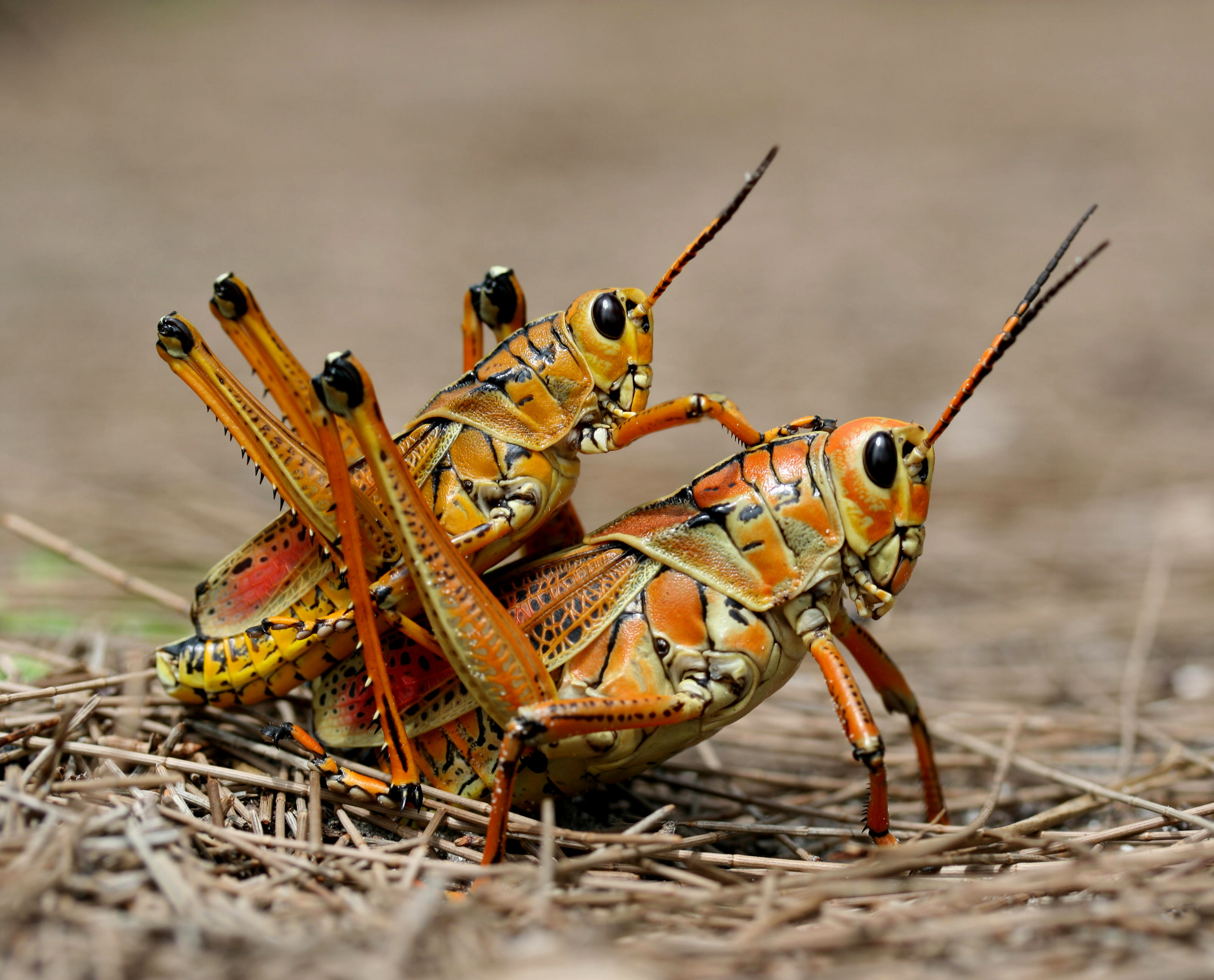
Romalea microptera

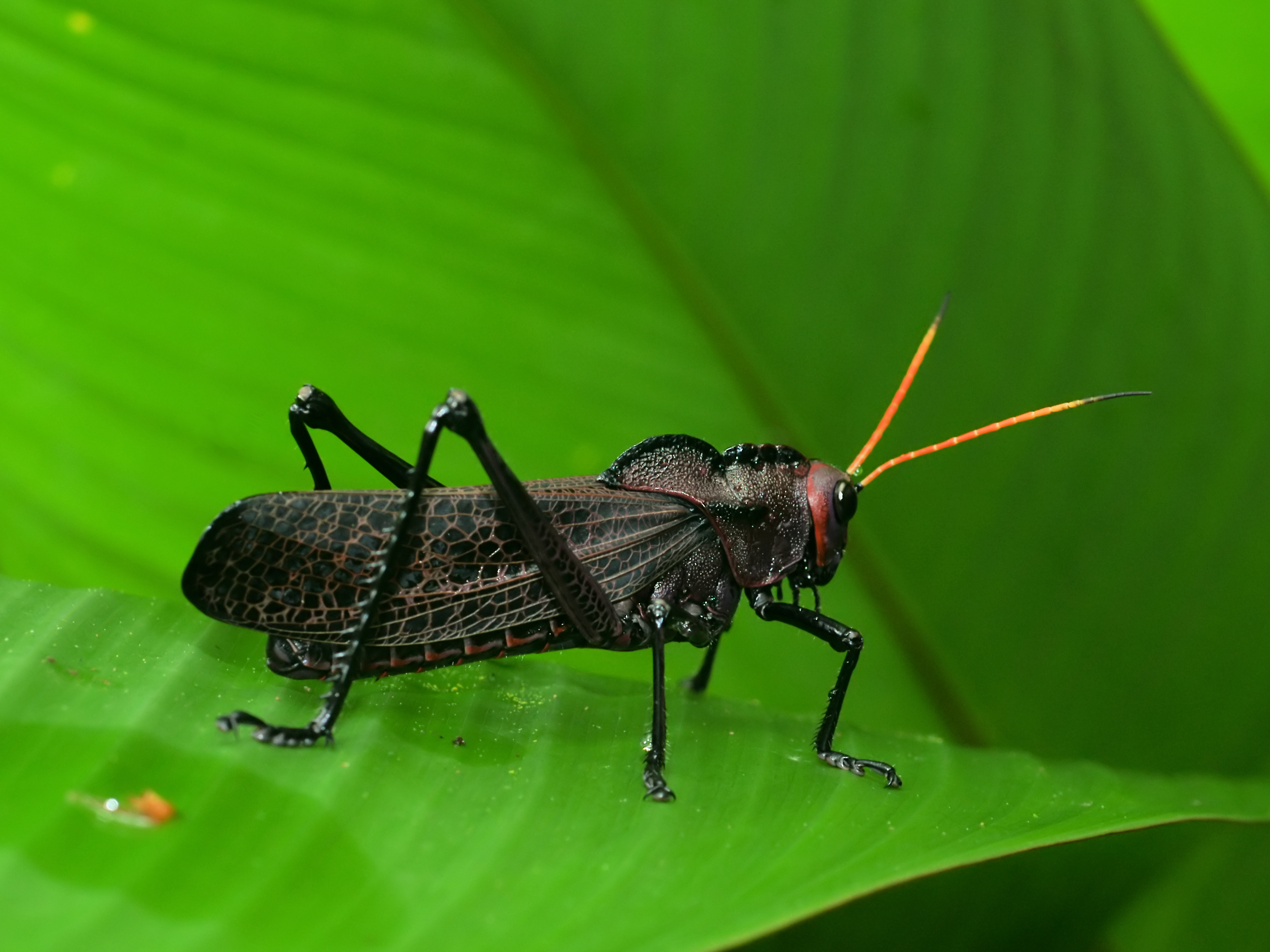
Taeniopoda reticulata

Auth: Pictet & Saussure, 1887

1. Alophonota Stål, 1873
2. Antandrus Stål, 1878
3. Aplatacris Scudder, 1875
4. Brachystola Scudder, 1876 (grassland lubbers)
5. Callonotacris Rehn, 1909
6. Chromacris Walker, 1870
7. Coryacris Rehn, 1909
8. Costalimacris Carbonell & Campos-Seabra, 1988
9. Diponthus Stål, 1861
10. Dracotettix Bruner, 1889 (dragon lubbers)
11. Eidalcamenes Rosas Costa, 1957
12. Gurneyacris Liebermann, 1958
13. Limacridium Carbonell & Campos-Seabra, 1988
14. Litoscirtus Bruner, 1907
15. Phrynotettix Glover, 1872 (toad lubbers)
16. Radacridium Carbonell, 1984
17. Romalea Serville, 1831 (lubber grasshopper)
18. Spaniacris Hebard, 1937
19. Taeniopoda Stål, 1873
20. Thrasyderes Bolívar, 1881
21. Tytthotyle Scudder, 1897
22. Xestotrachelus Bruner, 1913
23. Zoniopoda Stål, 1873

=== Tropidacrini ===
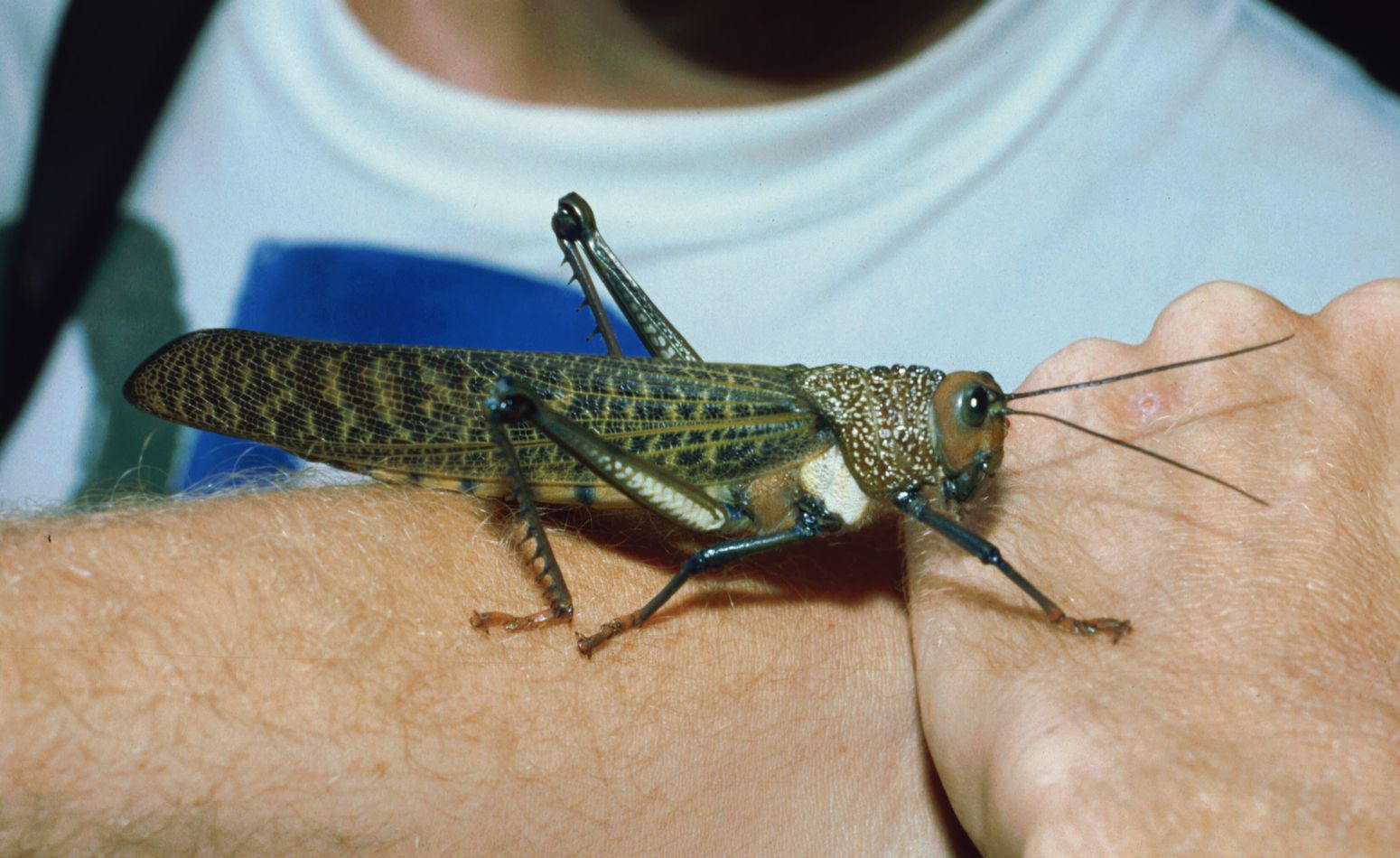
Tropidacris cristata

Auth: Brunner von Wattenwyl, 1893

1. Titanacris Scudder, 1869
2. Tropidacris Scudder, 1869

=== Trybliophorini ===
Auth: Giglio-Tos, 1898

- Trybliophorus Serville, 1831

tribe not placed

- Quitus Hebard, 1924
