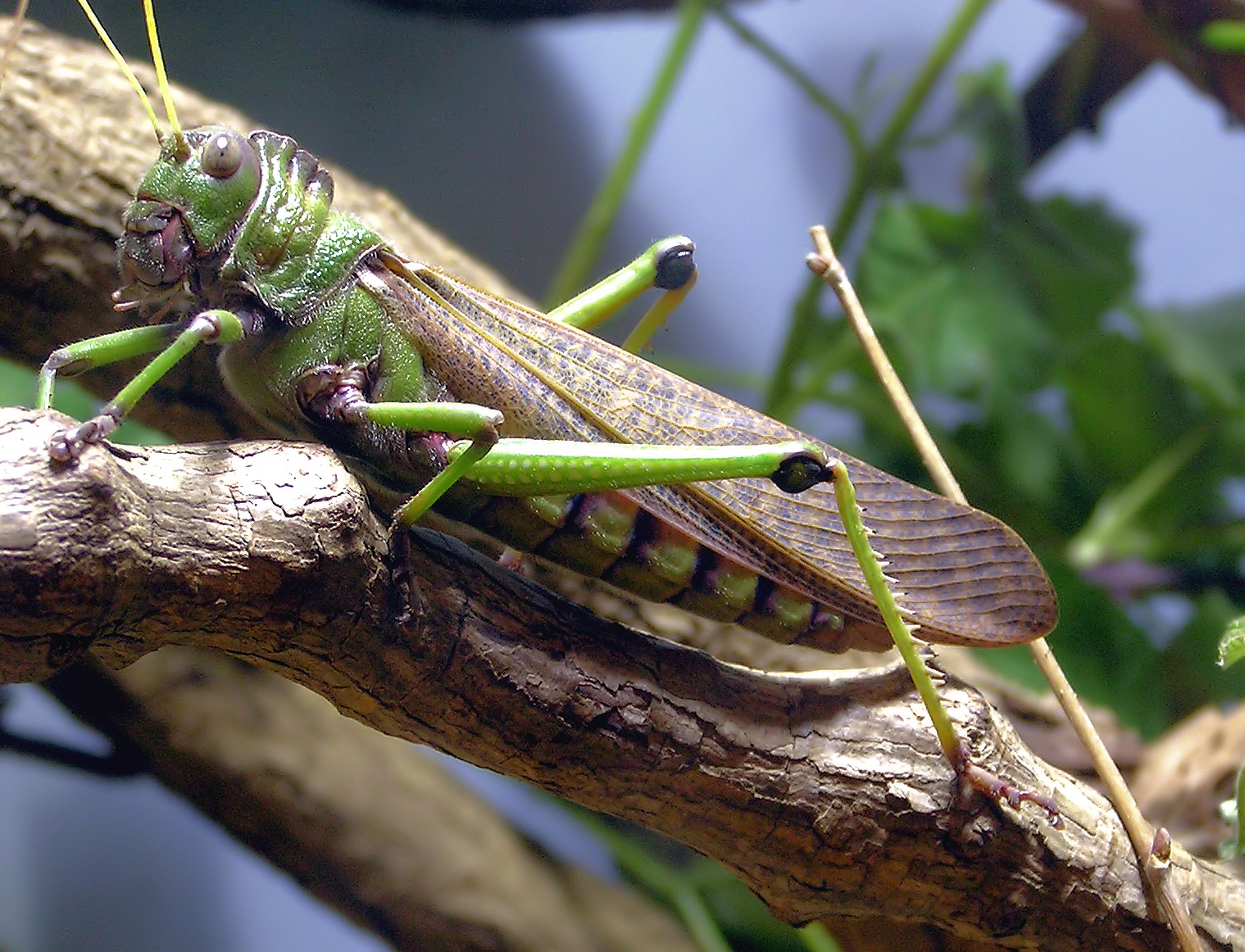
- Tropidacris collaris

Scientific classification
- Kingdom: Animalia
- Phylum: Arthropoda
- Clade: Pancrustacea
- Class: Insecta
- Order: Orthoptera
- Suborder: Caelifera
- Superfamily: Acridoidea
- Family: Romaleidae; Brunner von Wattenwyl, 1893

Subfamilies
- Bactrophorinae; Romaleinae

= Romaleidae =

Family of grasshoppers

The Romaleidae or lubber grasshoppers are a family of grasshoppers, based on the type genus Romalea. The species in this family can be found in the Americas. It is known to be polyphagous, but there is not much else known regarding its diet. The descriptive "lubber" is nautical slang for a big and clumsy person, referring to this grasshopper's limited or nonexistent ability to fly, seemingly clumsy and narrow range of movement, and relatively large size.

== Tribes and selected genera ==
The Orthoptera Species File Online database lists two subfamilies:

=== Bactrophorinae ===
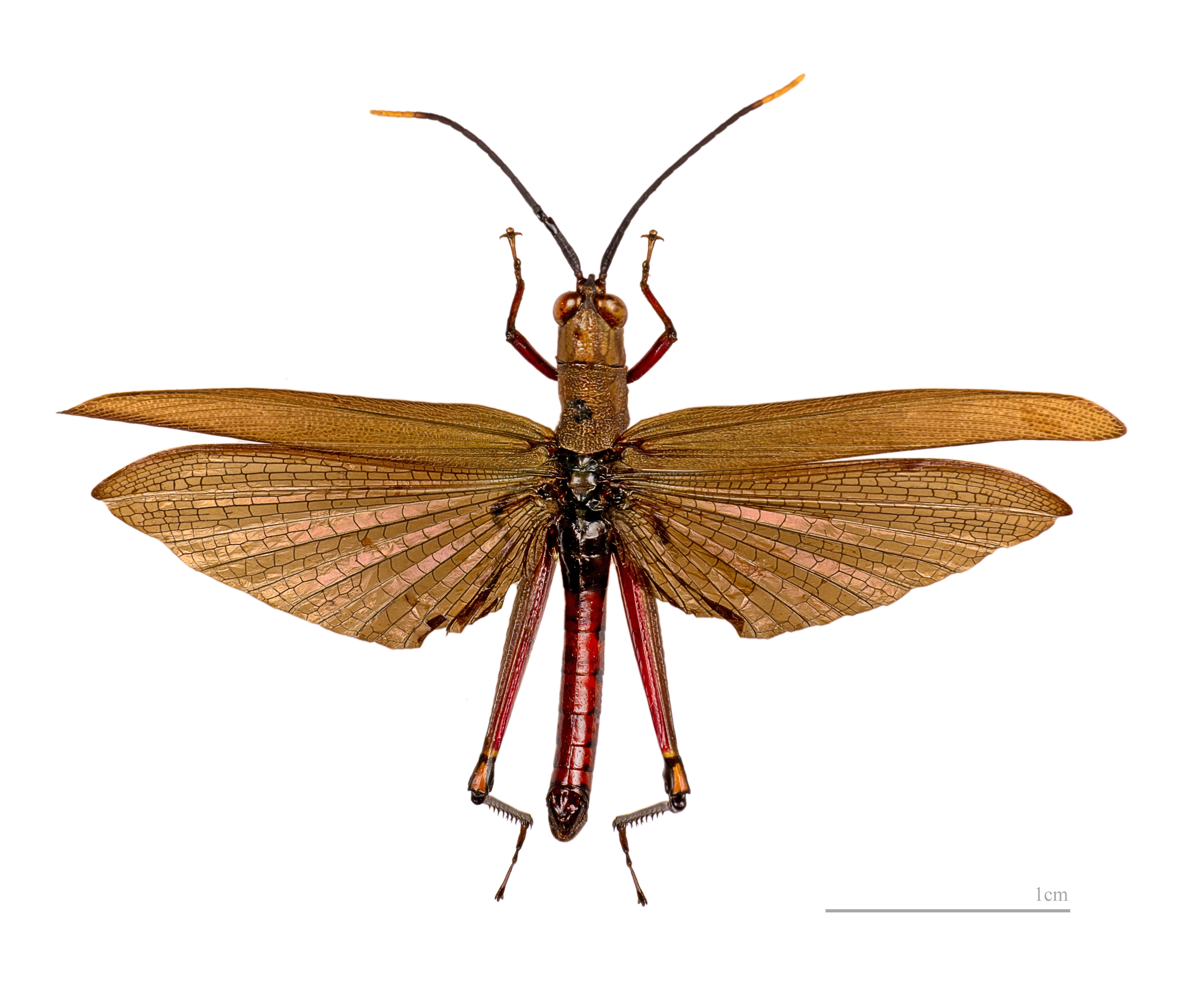
Othnacris surdaster (Bactrophorinae)

Auth. Amédégnato, 1974; distribution: central and tropical South America.

- Bactrophorini (Amédégnato, 1974)
  - Andeomezentia Amédégnato & Poulain, 1994
  - Bactrophora Westwood, 1842
  - Bora Amédégnato & Descamps, 1979
  - Cristobalina Rehn, 1938
  - Hyleacris Amédégnato & Descamps, 1979
  - Mezentia Stål, 1878
  - Panamacris Rehn, 1938
  - Rhicnoderma Gerstaecker, 1889
  - Silacris Amédégnato & Descamps, 1979
- Ophthalmolampini (Descamps, 1977)
  - Adrolampis Descamps, 1977
  - Aphanolampis Descamps, 1978
  - Apophylacris Descamps, 1983
  - Caenolampis Descamps, 1978
  - Chromolampis Descamps, 1977
  - Drypetacris Descamps, 1978
  - Elutrolampis Descamps, 1978
  - Euprepacris Descamps, 1977
  - Habrolampis Descamps, 1978
  - Hekistolampis Descamps, 1978
  - Helicopacris Descamps, 1978
  - Helolampis Descamps, 1978
  - Lagarolampis Descamps, 1978
  - Nautia Stål, 1878
  - Nothonautia Descamps, 1983
  - Ophthalmolampis Saussure, 1859
  - Othnacris (Descamps, 1977)
  - Peruviacris Descamps, 1978
  - Poecilolampis Descamps, 1978
  - Pseudonautia Descamps, 1978
  - Tikaodacris Descamps, 1978
  - Xenonautia Descamps, 1977
  - Zoumolampis Descamps, 1978
- Taeniophorini (Brunner von Wattenwyl, 1893)
  - Hylephilacris Descamps, 1978
  - Megacephalacris Descamps & Amédégnato, 1971
  - Megacheilacris Descamps, 1978
  - Taeniophora Stål, 1873

=== Romaleinae ===
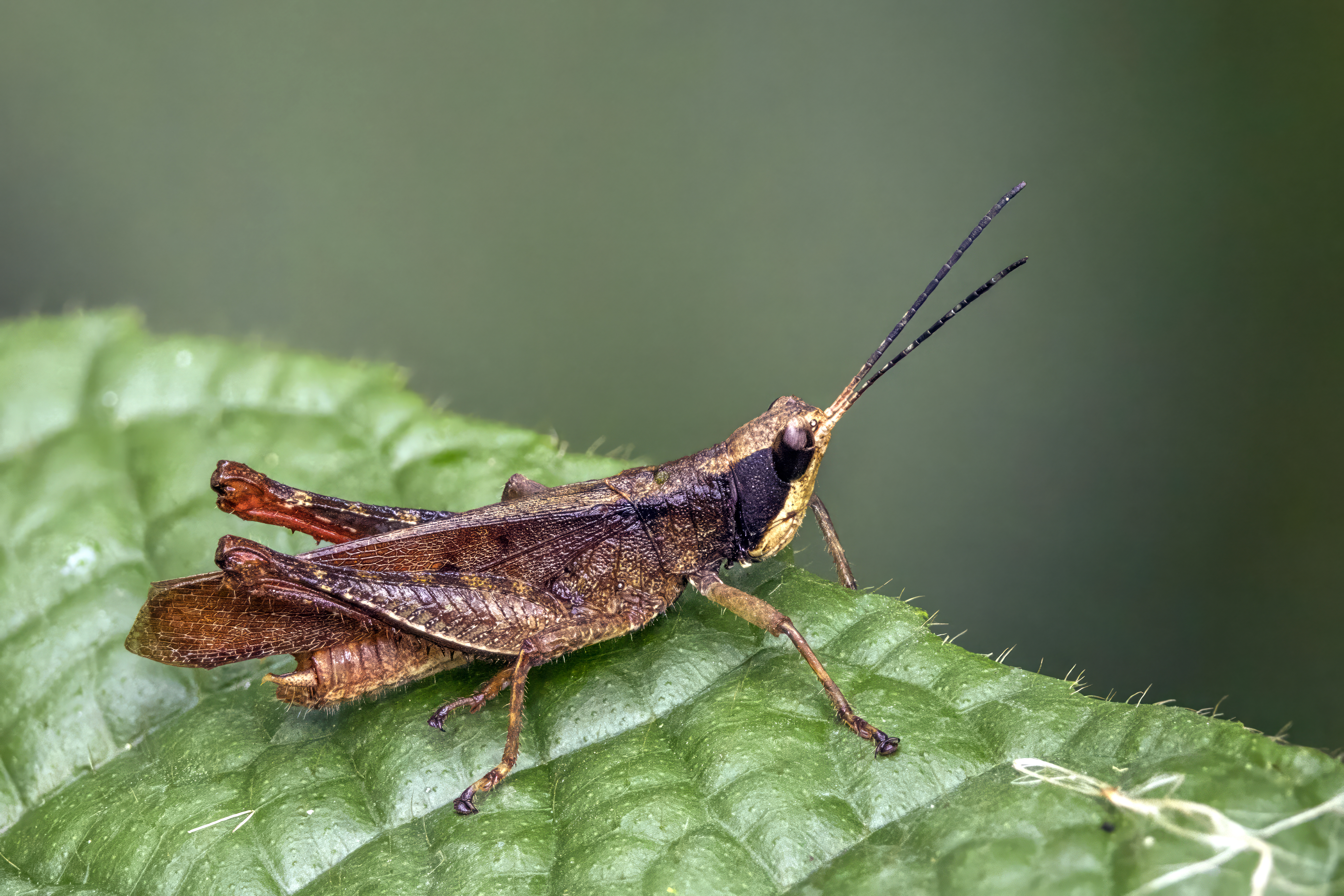
Pseudaristia oxycodia, Colombia

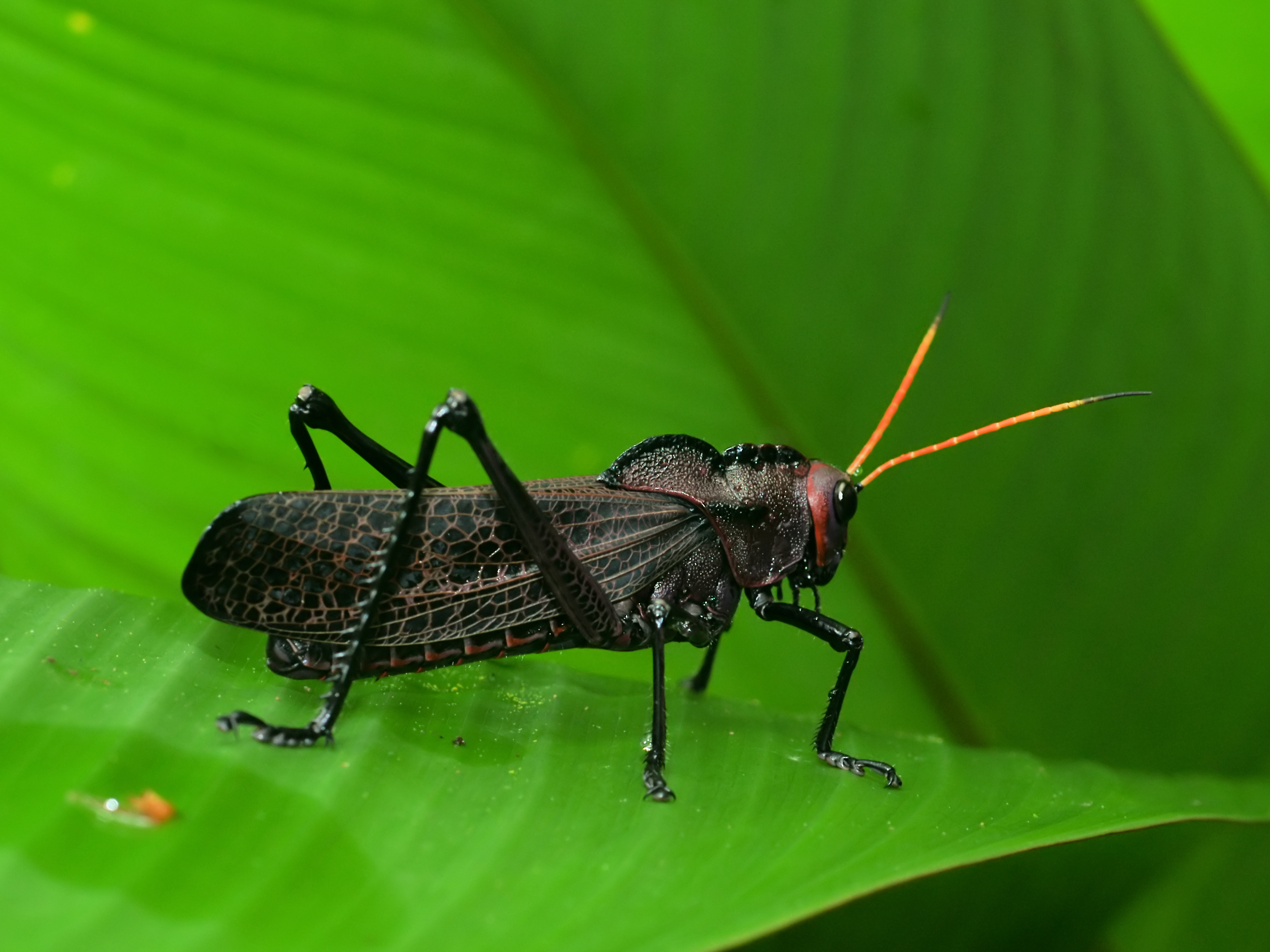
Taeniopoda reticulata

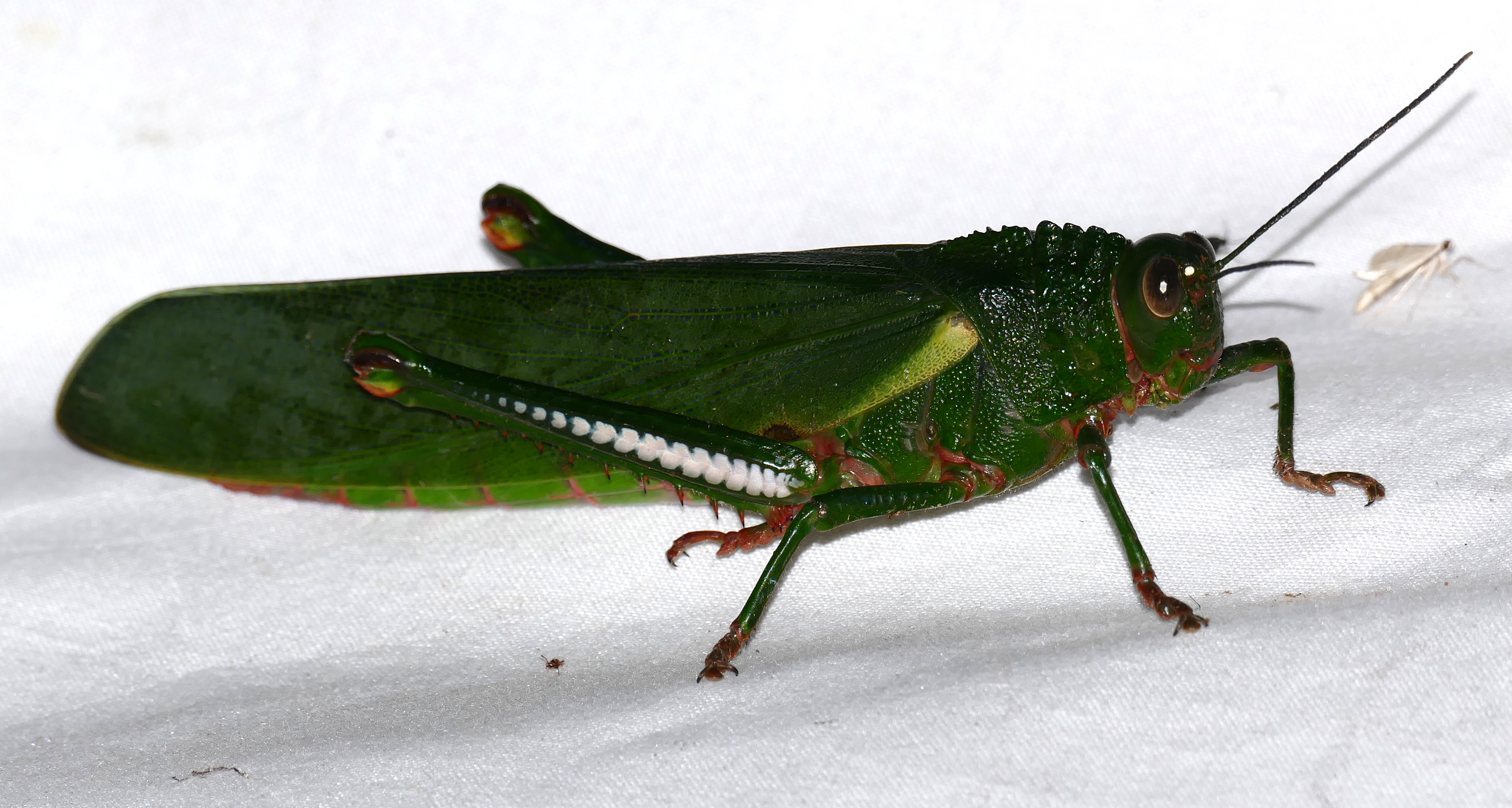
Titanacris albipes

Auth. (Brunner von Wattenwyl, 1893), selected genera:

- Eurostacrini (Amédégnato, 1997)
  - Eurostacris Descamps, 1978
  - Pseudeurostacris Descamps, 1978
- Hisychiini (Descamps, 1979)
  - Hisychius Stål, 1878
- Leguini (Amédégnato & Poulain, 1986)
  - Ampiacris Amédégnato & Poulain, 1986
  - Legua Walker, 1870
  - Proracris Uvarov, 1940
- Phaeopariini (Giglio-Tos, 1898)
  - Abila Stål, 1878
  - Phaeoparia Stål, 1873
- Procolpini (Giglio-Tos, 1898)
  - Procolpia Stål, 1873
- Romaleini (Brunner von Wattenwyl, 1893)
  - Brachystola Bruner, 1876
  - Dracotettix Bruner, 1889
  - Phrynotettix Glover, 1872
  - Romalea Serville, 1831 - monotypic - Romalea microptera (Palisot de Beauvois, 1817)
  - Spaniacris Hebard, 1937
  - Taeniopoda Stal, 1873
  - Titanacris Scudder, 1869
  - Tropidacris Scudder, 1869
  - Tytthotyle Scudder, 1897
- Trybliophorini (Giglio-Tos, 1898)
  - Trybliophorus Serville, 1831

=== Subfamily unassigned ===
  - Genus Quitus Hebard, 1924
