= List of insect-inspired songs =

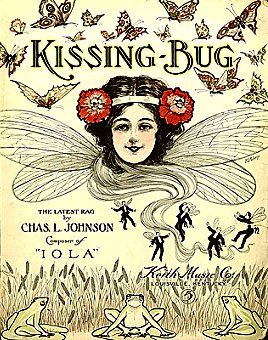
"Kissing-Bug" rag by Charles L. Johnson, 1909

This is a list of songs inspired by insects.

Insects in music are known from everything from classical music and opera to ragtime and pop.

Rimsky-Korsakov imitates the quick buzzing vibrato of the bumblebee in his famous "The Flight of the Bumblebee". Popular songs with an insect theme include "glow-worm", "Poor Butterfly", "La Cucaracha", "The Boll Weevil", and "The Blue-Tailed Fly". Operas like Puccini's Madam Butterfly and Rousel's Le Festin de L’Araignée similarly reference arthropods.

Pop groups named after insects include Buddy Holly and the Crickets, The Beatles, Adam and the Ants, Iron Butterfly, Flea and many others. Songs named after or inspired by the sounds of insects are listed below.

== List ==
Insect-inspired songs
Name of song	Insect order	Composer	Performing artist	Date	Type of music	Notes
Insect	Insects-general	Bladee	Bladee	2017	Cloud Rap	
I'm a Bug	Insects-general		Urinals	1978		
Crickets Sing for Anamaria	Orthoptera	Marcos Valle	Marcos Valle	1968	Bossa nova	Vocal version of Marcos Valle's instrumental tune "Os Grilos" that appeared on his 1967 album Brazilliance!
Honey Bee (Let Me Be Your Honey Bee)	Hymenoptera	Ollie Shepard	Ollie Shepard And His Kentucky Boys	1938	Blues / Honky-tonk	Released on Decca Records
The Attack of the Giant Ants	Hymenoptera	Chris Stein	Blondie	1976	Punk / New Wave / Rock	
I Got Ants in My Pants	Hymenoptera	James Brown	James Brown	1972	Funk	
Ants Marching	Hymenoptera	Dave Matthews	The Dave Matthews Band	1994	Pop / Rock	
Spiral of Ants	Hymenoptera	Neil Cicierega	Lemon Demon	2016	Electronic Rock	On the album Spirit Phone. Based on the phenomenon of ant mills.
Insects	Insects-general	Danny Elfman	Oingo Boingo	1982	Ska, New Wave, Synth Pop	
Bee in the Bottle	Hymenoptera	Sinead Lohan	Sinead Lohan	1995	Folk rock	
Dance of the Honeybees	Hymenoptera	Charlie Lennon	De Dannan; Frankie Gavin; Sharon Shannon; Altan	1986	Irish folk	Said to be based on the honeybee's waggle dance.
Mosquito	Diptera	Yeah Yeah Yeahs	Yeah Yeah Yeahs	2013	Indie rock	
The Mosquito	Diptera	John Densmore / Robby Krieger / Ray Manzarek	The Doors	1972	Rock	
Flight of the Bumblebee	Hymenoptera	Nikolai Rimsky-Korsakov	many artists	1899-1900	Classical	
One Note Samba/Spanish Flea	Siphonaptera	Antônio Carlos Jobim	Sergio Mendes-Brasil '66	1966	Bossa nova	
100,000 Fireflies	Coleoptera	Stephin Merritt	The Magnetic Fields	1993	Electronica	
Fireflies	Coleoptera	Adam Young	Owl City	2009	Electronica	
Hotaru Koi (Come Fireflies)	Coleoptera	(Traditional Japanese folk song)	(Traditional Japanese folk song)	Unknown	Folk	
Lady Bug	Coleoptera	Randy Rogers / Wade Bowen	Randy Rogers	2015	Country	
Mariposa traicionera	Lepidoptera	Fher Olvera	Mana	2003	Rock	
Butterfly	Lepidoptera	John Frusciante B/ret Mazur, M / chael "Flea" Balzary / Seth "Shifty Shellshock" Binzer	Crazy Town	2000	Rap rock	
Caterpillar	Lepidoptera	Peter Albin	Big Brother and the Holding Company	1967	Rock	This album was the studio debut for the band's lead singer, Janis Joplin.
The Caterpillar	Lepidoptera		The Cure	1984	Post-punk	
Grasshopper	Orthoptera	John Phillips	The Mamas and the Papas	1971	Folk rock	
The Grasshopper Unit (Keep Movin')	Orthoptera		Beastie Boys	2000	Rap rock	
Grasshoppers	Orthoptera	Ryuichi Sakamoto	Ryuichi Sakamoto	1978	Jazz fusion	
Moth	Lepidoptera	Chad Gray / Kevin Churko / Tom Maxwell / Vinnie Paul	Hellyeah	2014	Heavy metal	
Moth to a Flame	Lepidoptera	Roger Chapman	Roger Chapman	1979	Bluesrock	Second track of the album Chappo
Moth to the Flame	Lepidoptera	Luke Morley, Andy Taylor, Mikael Höglund	Thunder	1995	Rock	First track of the album Behind Closed Doors
Moth's Wings	Lepidoptera	Michael Angelako	Passion Pit	2009	Indietronica	
That's the way love goes	Lepidoptera	Janet Jackson / Jam & Lewis	Janet Jackson	1993	R & B	
Mayfly	Ephemeroptera	Stuart Murdoch	Belle and Sebastian	1996	Indie pop	
Doin' the Cockroach	Blattodea	Modest Mouse	Modest Mouse	1997	Indie rock	
Butterfly	Lepidoptera	Jason Mraz	Jason Mraz	2008	Pop / Rock	
Bugs	Insects-general	Eddie Vedder	Pearl Jam	1994	Rock	
All My Friends Are Insects	Insects-general	Adam Deibert	Weezer	2010	Rock	
Georgia Warhorse	Orthoptera		JJ Grey & Mofro	2010	Funk rock	Named after the Southern Lubber Grasshopper
The Blackfly Song	Diptera	Wade Hemsworth	many artists	1949	Folk	Inspired a short animated film, Blackfly.
Black Fly	Diptera	Billy Gibbons	ZZ Top	2016	Southern rock	Third song on the album Rhythmeen
Mosquito Moan	Diptera		Blind Lemon Jefferson	1927	Blues	
Termite	Blattodea		Young Thug	2015	Hip hop	
Shoo Fly, Don't Bother Me	Diptera	Thomas Brigham Bishop*	many artists	1869	Folk	The writer of the song is somewhat contentious (see Shoo Fly, Don't Bother Me)
Killa Beez	Hymenoptera		Killa Beez	2002	Hip hop	
Wu Killa Beez: The Reemergence	Hymenoptera		Remedy	1998	Hip hop	
Dragonfly	Odonata	Ziggy Marley	Ziggy Marley	2003	Reggae	
The King Beetle on the Coconut Estate	Coleoptera	mewithoutyou / Aaron Weiss	mewithoutyou	2009	Indie rock	
Fireflies	Coleoptera	Harmony Samuels D/awn Richard, d/rew Scott	Zendaya	2013	Electronica	
The Cricket Song	Orthoptera		Rich O'Toole	2011	Country	
Frass	Insects-general		Renaldo and the Loaf	1981	Experimental	The whole album, Songs for Swining Larvae, is inspired by insects.
There Ain't No Bugs On Me	Insects-general	(Traditional folk song)	(Traditional folk song)	Unknown	Folk	There is a popular recording of this song by Jerry Garcia and David Grisman on the album, Not for Kids Only.
Dog and Butterfly	Lepidoptera	Ann Wilson N/ancy Wilson, / e Ennis	Heart	1978	Folk rock	
Hive	Hymenoptera	Sexton / Nick Hexum / Martinez	311	1995	Rap rock	
Red Mosquito	Diptera	Jeff Ament S/tone Gossard, c/k Irons, Mi /McCready, Eddi /Vedder	Pearl Jam	1996	Rock	
The Bug	Insects-general	Mark Knopfler	Dire Straits	1991	Rock	
The Bug Collector	Insects-general	Haley Heynderickx	Haley Heynderickx	2018	Folk music	
I am the Fly	Diptera	Graham Lewis / Colin Newman	Wire	1978	Punk rock	
Centipede	Chilopoda	Rebbie Jackson	Centipede (album)	1983	RnB	
Human Fly	Diptera	Lux Interior, Ivy Rorschach	The Cramps	1979	Punk rock	
Fly on the Wall	Diptera	Miley Cyrus A/ntonina Armato, T /m James, v/rim Karaoglu	Miley Cyrus	2009	Pop rock	
Fly on the Wall	Diptera	Malcolm Young Angus Young /Brian Johnson	AC/DC	1983	Rock	
Fly on the Wall	Diptera	Luke Morley	Thunder	1995	Rock	Second track of the album Behind Closed Doors
Fly on the Wall	Diptera	The Jesus Lizard	The Jesus Lizard	1994	Rock	
Fly on a Windshield	Diptera	Tony Banks Phil Collins Peter Gabriel Steve Hackett Mike Rutherford	Genesis	1974	Progressive Rock	
Insect Hospital	Insects-general		They Might Be Giants	2013	Rock	
March of the Fire Ants	Hymenoptera	Mastodon	Mastodon	2002	Heavy metal	
Beetle	Coleoptera		Mooi Wark		Rock	
Beetle in the Box	Coleoptera	Louis Abbott	Admiral Fallow	2012	Indie pop	
Black Beetle Pies	Coleoptera	Trad / arr Flood	Bellowhead	2012	Folk	
Dragonfly Keeper	Odonata	Phildel	Phildel	2010	Neoclassical	Instrumental
Durability	Insects-general		Tribes of Neurot	2002	Experimental	The entire album Adaptation and Survival, on which this track is found, is composed entirely of manipulated insect sounds.
Silverfish	Thysanura		Sounds of System Breakdown	2013	Electronic music	Instrumental
Pediculosis (Mommy, I Have Lice)	Phthiraptera		Fumigation	2015	Metal	
The Dreaded Sea Lice Have Come Aboard	Phthiraptera		Guttermouth	1999	Rock	
Rats and Mice and Swarms of Lice	Phthiraptera		Thou	2014	Sludge Metal	
Love Lice	Phthiraptera		Fake Shark - Real Zombie!	2009	Rock	
Earwigs To Eternity	Dermaptera		Alice Cooper	2009	Rock	
Catfood On The Earwig	Dermaptera		Guided by Voices	1994	Rock	
Earwig Town Lyric	Dermaptera		Chairlift	2008	Rock	
Earwig	Dermaptera		The Dead Milkmen	1986	Rock	
The Louse House of Kilkenny	Phthiraptera		The Dubliners	1978	Irish folk	
Lacewings	Neuroptera	Alasdair MacLean and The Clientele	The Clientele	2014	Indie Pop	
Locust	Orthoptera	Robb Flynn/ Philip Demmel	Machine Head	2011	Thrash	
Day of the Locusts	Orthoptera	Bob Dylan	Bob Dylan	1970	Folk rock	The song's lyrics refer to Brood X of the 17-year periodical cicada (often misidentified as "locusts"), per New Morning explanation
Crickets	Orthoptera	Damon Thomas Santo/ Allan Craig Iida/ Christopher Daniel Goodman/ Jonathan Rotem/ Anthony Vincent Cozzo/ Christian Scott Condo	Drop City Yacht Club	2013	Hip hop	
Crickets	Orthoptera	Jaron Boyer/ Colt Ford/ Jeffery Don Hyde	Colt Ford	2014	Country	
Cricketz	Orthoptera	Earl Benjamin/ Keith Brown/ Dominic Thomas/ Michael Stevenson	New Boyz	2009	Hip hop	
Cricket On A Line	Orthoptera	Christopher Wongwon/ Jared Sciullo Riley/ Luther Roderick Campbell/ Justin N. Spillner/ Rhett Akins/ Colt Ford	Colt Ford	2010	Country	
Crickets	Orthoptera	Brent Baxter/ Lisa Shaffer/ Bill Whyte	Joe Nichols	2013	Country	
Bug Rain	Insects-general		Looper		Hip Hop / Rap	
Cicada	Hemiptera		Liam Titcomb	2012	Rock	
Sicka Cicadas	Hemiptera		Kathy Ashworth	2011	Country	
Song to the Cicadas	Hemiptera		The Greenhouse Culture Band, CS Luxem	2015		Collaboration to celebrate the cicada
Aphids	Hemiptera		Hum	2010		lyrics
Night of the Cicada	Hemiptera		The People's Republic of Europe	2014	Electronic	Netherlands
Mayfly	Ephemeroptera		Belle & Sebastian	2003	Indie pop	
Mayfly	Ephemeroptera		Rasputina	1998	Rock	
Mayfly	Ephemeroptera		Ben Winship & David Thompson	2009	Acoustic Folk	
Mayfly	Ephemeroptera		Andrew Chalk & Tom James Scott	2013	Electronic	
Mayfly Waltz (for Dilly)	Ephemeroptera	Michael Hoppe	various artists	2013	New Age	
Flea	Siphonaptera		Clazziquai	2008	Pop	
Flea Brain	Siphonaptera		Vincent Gene	2005	Country	
Flea Fly	Siphonaptera	Red Hot Chili Peppers	Red Hot Chili Peppers	1994	Rock	
Flea Versus MIte	Siphonaptera	The Presidents of the United States of America	The Presidents of the United States of America	2014	Alternative Rock	
Sabrina Sabrina, Flea Ballerina	Siphonaptera	Mr. Billy	Mr. Billy	2008	Children's Music	
Fifi the Flea	Siphonaptera	Mary Black	Mary Black	2011	New Age	
Fifi the Flea	Siphonaptera	The Hollies	The Hollies	1998	Rock	
Spanish Flea	Siphonaptera		Allan Sherman	2005	Miscellaneous	
Spanish Flea	Siphonaptera		Herb Alpert and The Tijuana Brass	1965	Jazz	
Flea in Your Ear	Siphonaptera		Simian Mobile Disco	2008	Electronic	
Madama Butterfly	Lepidoptera	Giacomo Puccini		1903	Opera	
Butterflies and Hurricanes	Lepidoptera	Muse	Muse	2004	Alternative Rock	
Butterfly Kisses	Lepidoptera	Bob Carlisle	Bob Carlisle	1997	Contemporary	
Cockroaches	Blattodea	Necro	Necro	2000	hip-hop	
I Hate Cockroaches	Blattodea	Bananas at Large	Bananas at Large	1993	Parody	
Butterfly	Lepidoptera	Bassnectar	Bassnectar	2012	Electronic	
Termite	Blattodea	Jungle by Night	Jungle by Night	2011	instrumental	
The termite song	Blattodea	The Woodbox Gang	The Woodbox Gang	2001	Bluegrass	
Odonata	Odonata		Stuart Masters	2013	Folk	Instrumental
Oh, Odonata	Odonata		The Brave Optimistic	2015	Indie rock	Title track of album
The Wasps	Hymenoptera	Ralph Vaughan Williams		1909	Incidental music	For Aristophanes' play The Wasps
Mosquito	Diptera	Ingrid Michaelson	Ingrid Michaelson	2005	Pop	
Mosquito	Diptera	Bomfunk MC	Bomfunk MC	2004	Electronic	
Mosquito	Diptera	Franck Langolff	Vanessa Paradis	1988	French Pop	
Butterfly Bleu	Lepidoptera	Iron Butterfly	Iron Butterfly	1970	Rock	
Iron Butterfly Theme	Lepidoptera	Iron Butterfly	Iron Butterfly	1968	Rock	
Springtail Boogie	Collembola	Kenneth Johnston	Instrumental Music from the Horsehead Point Community	2007	Rock	
Thrips	Thysanoptera	Egret Sylvie	Carpe Diem	2016	Electronic	
Airplane Mode	Collembola	Flobots	Survival Story	2010	Rock	
Intro with Cicadas	Hemiptera	The Firefly Choir	The Insect Songbook Vol. 1	2016	Electronic	Entire album is inspired by various orders of insects.
Flea Bitten Annie	Siphonaptera		The A-Bones	1993	Garage rock	
Dropping Like Flies	Diptera		The Accüsed	1990	Thrash metal	
Scream of the Butterfly	Lepidoptera		Acid Bath	1994	Sludge metal	
Cassie Eats Cockroaches	Blattodea		Acid Bath	1994	Sludge metal	
Ants Invasion	Hymenoptera	Adam Ant/Marco Pirroni	Adam and the Ants	1980	New wave	
Antmusic	Hymenoptera	Adam Ant/Marco Pirroni	Adam and the Ants	1980	New wave	
Ant Rap	Hymenoptera	Adam Ant/Marco Pirroni	Adam and the Ants	1981	New wave	
Rap de las Hormigas	Hymenoptera	Charly García	Charly García	1987	New wave	
King Wasp	Hymenoptera		Add N to (X)	1998	Electroclash	
Butterfly	Lepidoptera		Admiral Bailey	1992	Dancehall	
Joanie's Butterfly	Lepidoptera	Steven Tyler/Jimmy Crespo/Jack Douglas	Aerosmith	1982	Hard rock	
Empire Ants	Hymenoptera	Damon Albarn	Gorillaz	2010	Electro-funk / Alternative Dance	Features the vocals of Little Dragon's Yukumi Nagano
Insects Are All Around Us	Orthoptera	Mark Ramos-Nishita	Money Mark	1994	Lo-Fi Downtempo / Funk	Contains spoken word sample relating to Crickets.
Cicada Love Call	Hemiptera	F. Anderson / T. Swift	Toby Swift Music	2021	Country / Novelty	Contains spoken word
Hey There, Little Insect	Insecta		Jonathan Richman and the Modern Lovers	1976		Lyrics
The Predatory Wasp of the Palisades Is Out to Get Us!	Hymenoptera	Sufjan Stevens	Sufjan Stevens	2005		Lyrics
Bees	Hymenoptera	Laura Cantrell	Laura Cantrell	2005		Lyrics
Praying Mantis	Mantodea	Don Dixon	Don Dixon	1985		Lyrics
Mississippi Bo Weavil Blues	Coleoptera: Boll weevil	Charley Patton	Charley Patton	1929		Lyrics
Escapism (Gettin’ Free)	Insecta	Digable Planets	Digable Planets	1993		Lyrics
Frelon Brun (Brown Hornet)	Hymenoptera		Miles Davis	1961	Jazz	Instrumental
El Grillo	Orthoptera	Josquin des Prez	many performers	1505		Lyrics
Sex Jam Two: Insect Incest	Hymenoptera		Milemarker	2000	Rock / Post-hardcore	
Venus' Flytrap And The Bug	Insecta		Stevie Wonder	1979	Pop / Jazz-Funk	From the POV of an insect being coerced and preyed upon by a Venus Flytrap.
Cicada Days	Hemiptera	Will Wood	Will Wood	2022	Folk rock	Single from Will Wood's album, In Case I Make It, and partially inspired by cicadas' brooding patterns.
The Mayfly Dance	Ephemeroptera	Switchback	Switchback	2010	Folk	
Wings Off Flies	Diptera	Nick Cave/JG Thirlwell	Nick Cave and the Bad Seeds	1984	Post-punk / Experimental rock	Lyrics
Cockroach Waltz	Blattodea	Jack Off Jill	Jack Off Jill	1996	Goth rock	Lyrics
Hornet's Heart	Hymenoptera	Brian Hageman	Thinking Fellers Union Local 282	1992	Experimental rock	Lyrics
Hive	Hymenoptera	Mark Davies	Thinking Fellers Union Local 282	1992	Experimental rock	Lyrics
Being Boiled	Bombyx mori	Philip Oakey, Martyn Ware, Ian Craig Marsh	The Human League	1978	Electronic, synthpop	A protest against sericulture
I'm Nature's Mosquito	Hemiptera	Jonathan Richman	Jonathan Richman and the Modern Lovers	1979	Rock	
Kabutomushi	Allomyrina	Aiko Yanai	aiko	1999	J-Pop	Lyrics
Outdoor Miner	Agromyzidae	Colin Newman / Graham Lewis	Wire	1979	Post-punk / jangle pop	Song is about the life cycle of the serpentine leaf miner, and inspired by co-writer Lewis' fascination with this insect.
Flohwalzer	Siphonaptera	traditional	many artists		Classical	Simple piano piece, also known as 'the Flea Waltz'.
Butterfly	Lepidoptera	Robert Uhlmann	Smile.dk	1998	Eurodance / bubblegum pop	
I wanna be a one day fly	Ephemeroptera	Viggo Waas / Owen Schumacher / Joep van Deutekom / Peter Heerschop / Peter Schön / Hans Sibbel / Daan van Rijsbergen / Jack Spijkerman / Hans Riemens	One Day Fly (Kopspijkers)	2001	Pop / Satire	Band name is a play on 'eendagsvlieg', the Dutch word for both 'mayfly' and 'one-hit wonder'
Eurhopalathrix	Hymenoptera	AxExHxCx	AxExHxCx	2023	Gorenoise/Goregrind/ Rock	Single from "HYPOPOMYRMEX" It was released by GxMxPx & AxExHxCx and the album is based entirely around ants.
Bugs	Insects-general	Jesse Welles	Jesse Welles	2024	Folk	Lyrics
