= Switchback =

Switchback may refer to:

== Transportation ==
- A hairpin turn on a road
- A horseshoe curve
- A zigzagging pedestrian or cycling ramp
- A roller coaster, or a roller coaster-like road
- A zig zag (railway)
- The Switchback, a former railway line in Glasgow, Scotland
- A motorcycle having detachable windscreens and luggage bags, e.g. Harley-Davidson's Dyna 2012 model

== Entertainment ==
- Switchback Railway, the first roller coaster designed as an amusement ride in the United States
- Switchback (rollercoaster), a wooden roller coaster located at ZDT's Amusement Park
- Switchback (band), a duo which plays Americana music
- Switchback (TV series), a Canadian television show for children and teens broadcast on the CBC in the 1980s
- Switchback (comics), a Marvel Comics character connected to the X-Men
- Switchback (film), a 1997 film starring Dennis Quaid and Danny Glover
- "Switchback" (Celldweller song), a song from Celldweller's album Celldweller
- "Switchback" (Music for Pleasure song), a song from Music for Pleasure's album Into the Rain

== Other uses ==
- Colorado Springs Switchbacks FC, an association football club in Colorado, United States
- Switchback, West Virginia, an unincorporated community in the United States
- In asymptotic analysis (mathematics), a term of intermediate order multiplying a homogenous solution (forced by matching to an outer solution)
- Magnetic switchback, a sudden reversal in the magnetic field of the solar wind observed on the Sun
