= Hamiltonhill Branch =

Former railway line in Scotland

The Hamiltonhill Branch was constructed by the Caledonian Railway in 1894 with the intention to provide a large goods yard at Hamiltonhill on the Forth and Clyde Canal. There was also a branch to the Saracen Foundry but this had to be closed as it was in breach of an agreement with the North British Railway.

== History ==
The original act of parliament for the construction of the line was granted in 1876 but this lapsed before construction could begin. A second act was passed in the 1890s for the construction of the line. Most of the line opened between 1894 and 1896. in 1926 a branch was opened that served Robroyston Colliery. This branch closed in 1944.

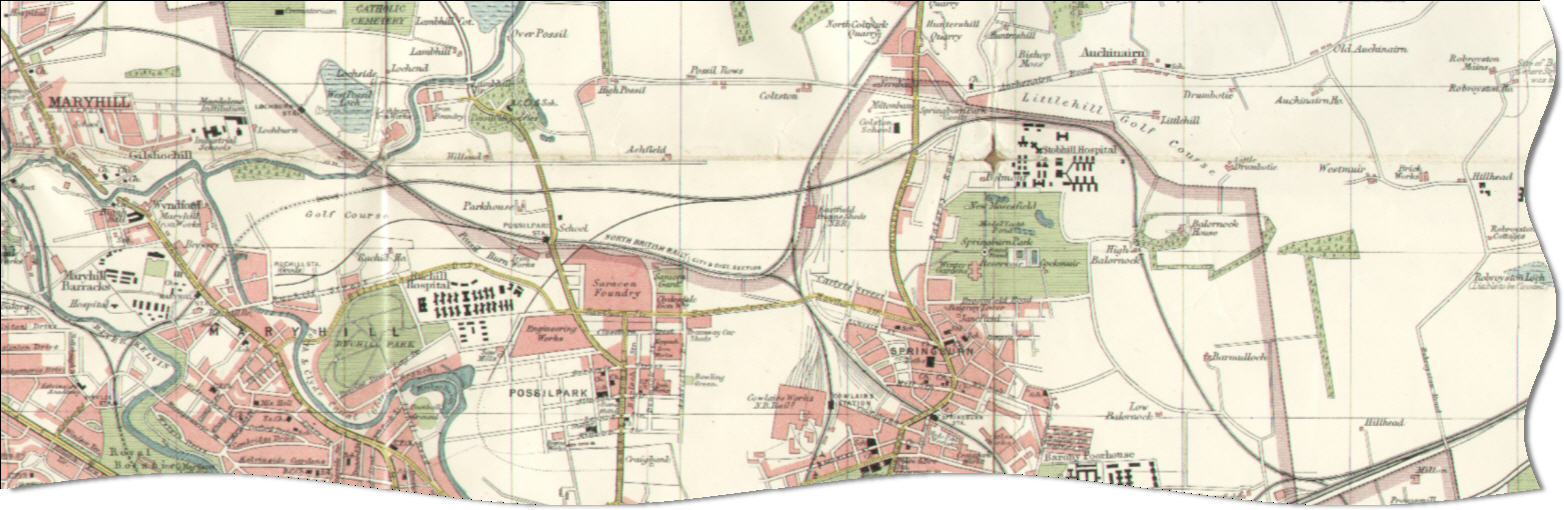
Map of the Hamiltonhill Branch in 1923

The Hamiltonhill yard closed at an early date, however the section of the line was extended by the Lanarkshire and Dunbartonshire Railway to Dumbarton and gave the Caledonian Railway access to Balloch, linking through to the Garnkirk and Glasgow Railway to the east. Part of the route between Eastfield and Possil was built along the course of an old waggonway which had run from pits at Eastfield to the Forth and Clyde Canal at Ruchill.

Much of the former trackbed is still visible to this day.

== Current operations ==
The line is now closed, having ceased operations in 1965

== Connections to other lines ==
- Lanarkshire and Dunbartonshire Railway at Possil Junction
- Garnkirk and Glasgow Railway at Balornock Junction
- The Caledonian Railway Switchback at Balornock Junction
