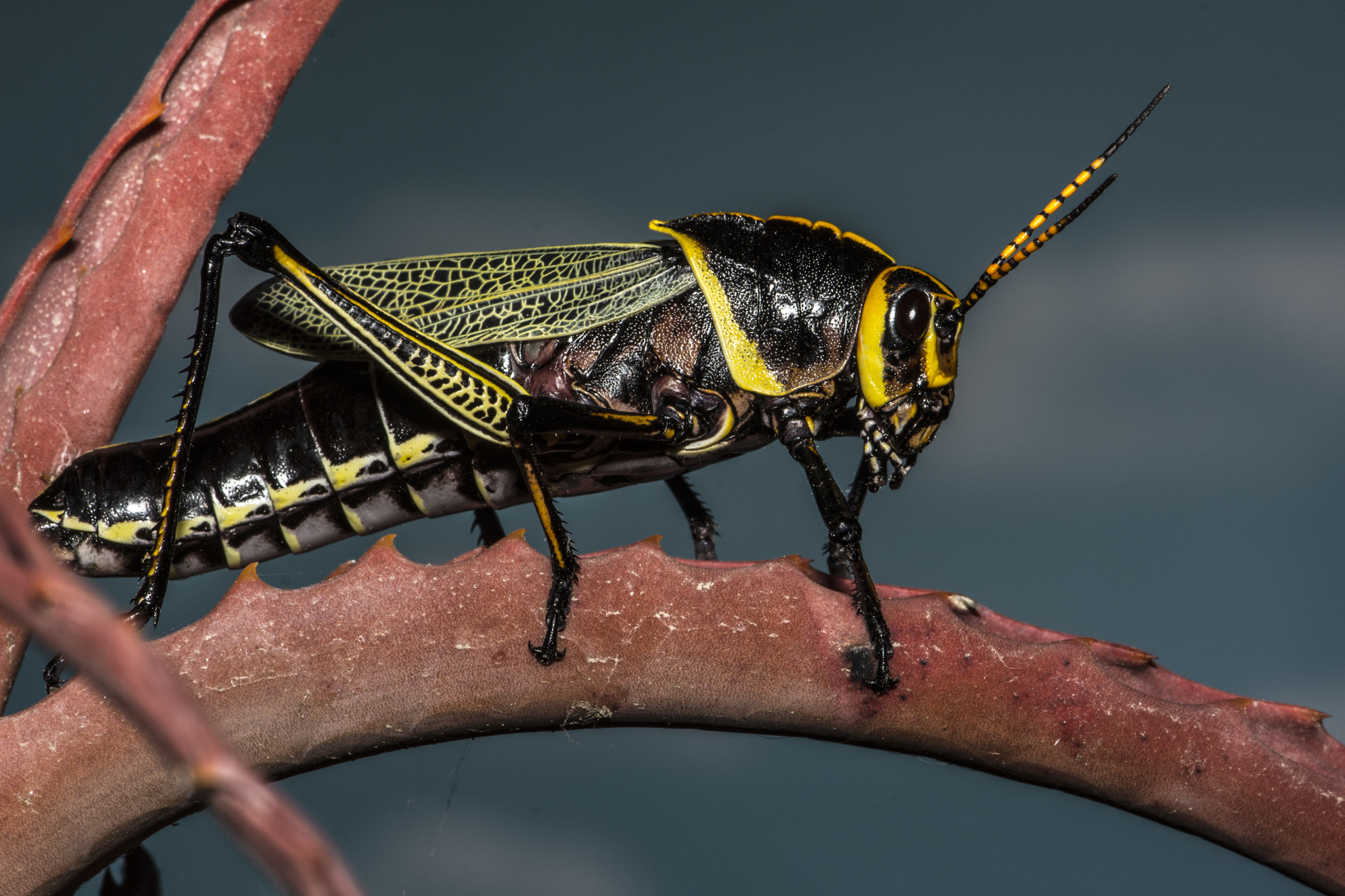
- Adult female

Scientific classification
- Kingdom: Animalia
- Phylum: Arthropoda
- Clade: Pancrustacea
- Class: Insecta
- Order: Orthoptera
- Suborder: Caelifera
- Family: Romaleidae
- Genus: Taeniopoda
- Species: T. eques

Binomial name
- Taeniopoda eques Burmeister, 1838

= Taeniopoda eques =

Species of grasshopper

Taeniopoda eques, the western horse lubber grasshopper, is a relatively large grasshopper species of the family Romaleidae found in arid and semi-arid parts of southwestern United States to central and southwestern Mexico. Most populations are identifiable by their shiny black bodies with contrasting yellow markings, but some adults (frequent in parts of Mexico, rare in the United States) are mostly yellowish, orangish or greenish. The species is unique in using its black coloration to thermoregulate and in being chemically defended. The aposematic coloration warns vertebrate predators of its unpalatability and allows the grasshopper to roost conspicuously upon shrubs.

== Etymology ==
T. eques was first described by Hermann Burmeister in 1838. The vernacular lubber refers to the flightless terrestrial status of the subfamily Romaleinae. Eques is the Latin term for "horseman".

== Distribution and habitat ==
T. eques is endemic to the United States and Mexico. In the United States, it ranges from the Chihuahuan Desert in southeastern Arizona, through southern New Mexico, to the Big Bend region of southwestern Texas. In Mexico, it ranges from the US border through the Mexican Plateau, Sierra Madre Oriental, the Transvolcanic Belt and along the country's Pacific coastal region south to Guerrero. Although occasionally reported as also occurring in Central American countries further south, this involves other species in the genus. It can occur at elevations of up to more than 2,150 m (7,050 ft) above sea level.

Its main habitats are arid and semi-arid brush and grassland, but it may also occur in oak savanna and woodland. It can be found among Acacia, Mimosa, Ephedra and Yucca shrubs. The Chihuahuan Desert receives a high amount of summer precipitation compared to other deserts, which is necessary for the grasshopper's development.

== Description ==
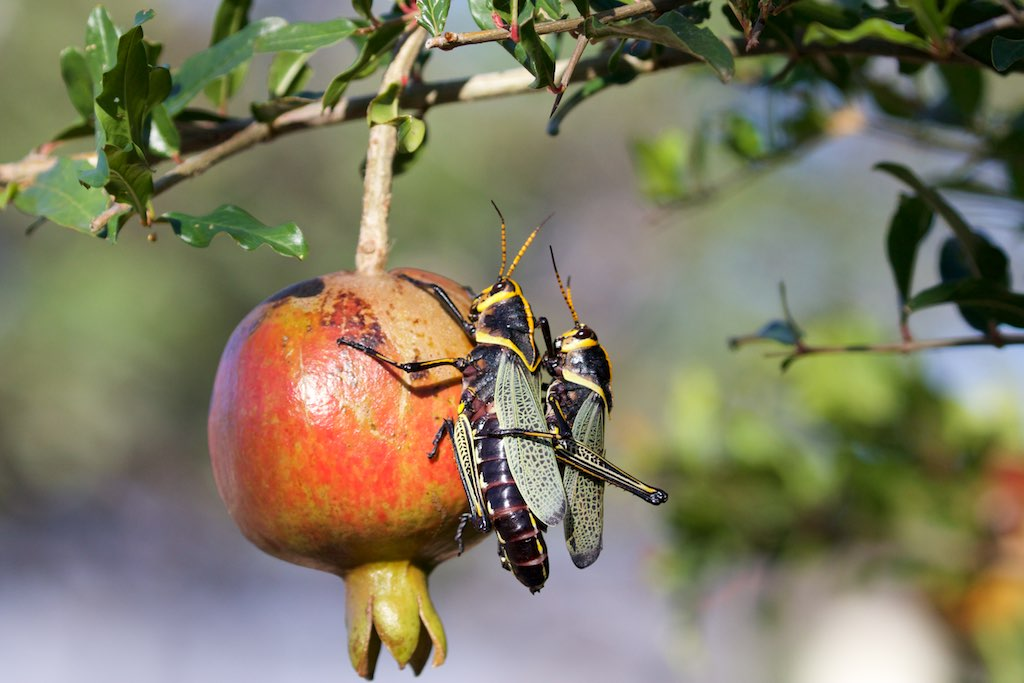
Mating pair in New Mexico. Note male's smaller size but relatively longer wings

T. eques and Romalea microptera (eastern lubber grasshopper), which are so closely related that they can interbreed in captivity (their natural ranges do not overlap), are the largest grasshoppers in the United States. Females of T. eques typically are 4–7.1 cm (1.6–2.8 in) long and males typically are 3.3–5.8 cm (1.3–2.3 in) long. Adult females can weigh up to around 9 g (0.32 oz) and adult males up to around 3 g (0.11 oz).

Males stridulate more commonly than females by expanding the hindwings against the closed forewings, thus flashing the bright red hindwings. It is unique among desert grasshoppers in its range because of its conspicuous size and coloring. The body is mostly black, with finely patterned black and yellow forewings with green veins and red hindwings with black borders. The antennae and head of the adult include orange markings. In some parts of Mexico, adults that are mostly yellowish, orangish or greenish (instead of largely black) are regularly encountered, but in the United States they are rare and most frequently seen in Arizona. The T. eques nymph essentially lacks wings and has a black-and-yellow coloration that resembles that of the adult. Dark adults and nymphs of Romalea microptera (eastern lubber grasshopper) are similar to and frequently confused with T. eques. Their ranges are not known to overlap but they could potentially come into contact in southern Texas; R. microptera has an eastern distribution in the state and T. eques a western distribution in the state.

Adults of both sexes have wings and in the male the forewings normally extend past the tip of the abdomen. However, most T. eques cannot fly; all females are flightless and only approximately 10 percent of adult males possess wings long enough for flight.

== Diet ==
Taeniopoda eques does not feed on the same plants it roosts on. In an experiment, it was found to be unable to survive on Acacia and Mimosa shrubs alone. It feeds mainly on foliage, flowers, and seed pods of low-growing summer desert annuals. T. eques only forages during daylight hours; at night it roosts near the tops of desert shrubs to hide from nocturnal ground predators. At dawn, it descends to the desert floor to feed on the annual plant species which are abundant following summer rains. T. eques drink free-standing water from raindrops. T. eques is known to be polyphagous, and also consumes a variety of other material, including spider silk and feces. It is an opportunistic carnivore and can occasionally be found scavenging for insect and vertebrate carrion. It can detect odors to find mammal and insect carcasses, which may provide a source of protein and nitrogen in the diet. The female is more likely to engage in necrophagy than the male T. eques. This difference may be explained by the female's greater need for protein and other nutrients to facilitate more rapid maturation and egg production. Cannibalism has been observed upon molting or incapacitated individuals of its own species.

== Life cycle ==
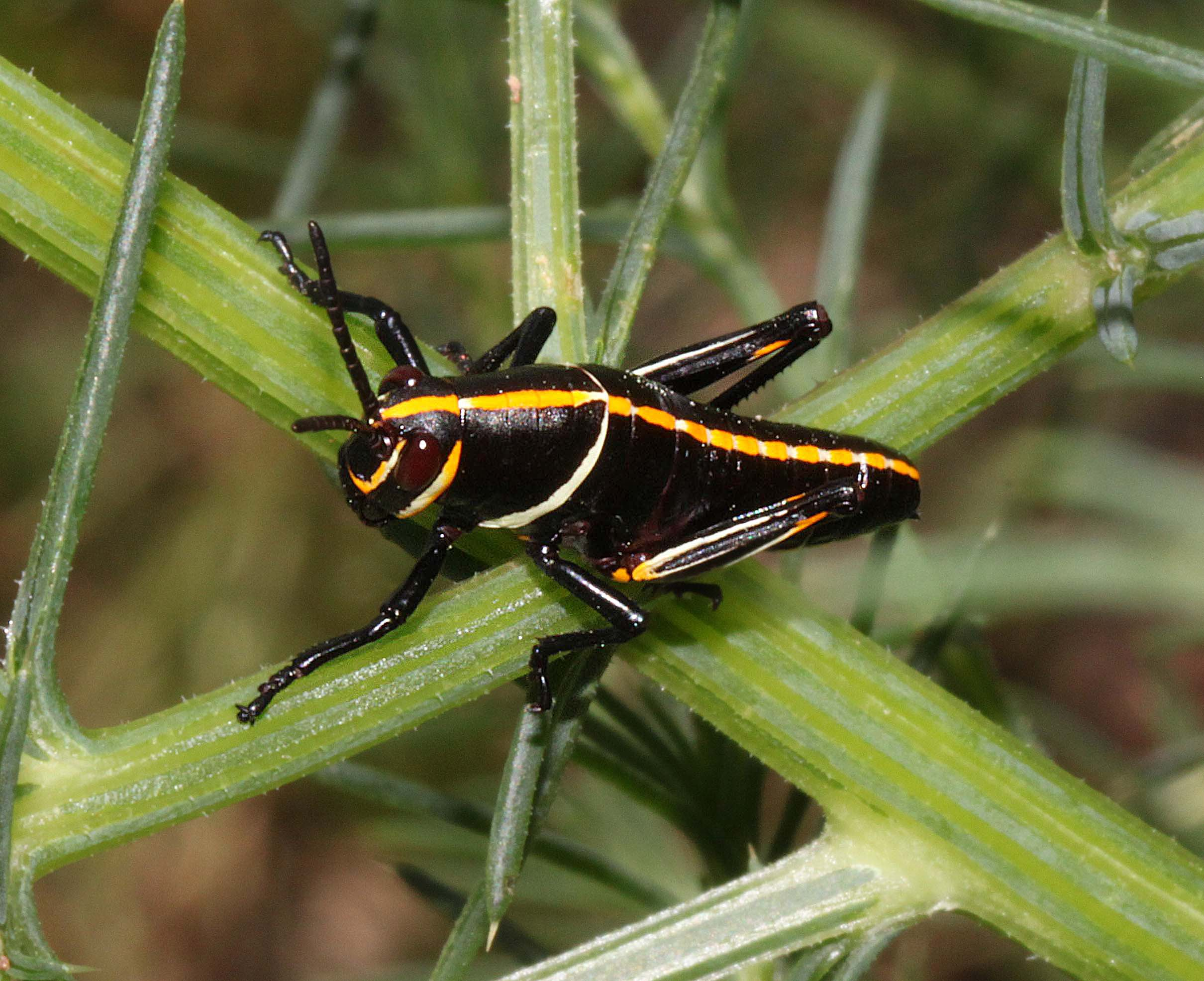
A nymph in southern Arizona

Taeniopoda eques is univoltine, producing only one brood of offspring per year. Females lay eggs at the base of shrubs or large rocks, depositing the approximately 50 eggs in a single pod 4-8 centimeters deep into the soil. The females also eject a liquid with the eggs, which dries and forms a hard case protecting the egg pod. In the United States, eggs are deposited in subterranean egg pods in October. The number of egg pods laid is dependent upon the rate of development in the adults and the time available before the frost sets in. The grasshoppers reach maturity in October and die in November during the winter freeze. Thermoregulation is necessary for speeding the development of T. eques to increase its reproductive chances before the favorable growing season ends.

Along with the onset of the summer rainy season, the young hatch in synchrony from subterranean egg pods in July. The larvae are especially vulnerable to predatory ants for about the first three minutes after hatching. After shedding the provisional cuticle, the larvae climb up the nearest vertical object. They are born reddish in color, but transform to black within two hours.

Despite its large size, T. eques has a relatively speedy rate of larval development, undergoing five nymphal molts to reach the adult stage in about 40 days. Recently molted individuals are brown but darken within two hours at warm temperatures. Temperature influences whether they can complete the molting process. At temperatures less than 25 °C, molting is usually not initiated. At temperatures above 36 °C, they can become stuck in old exoskeletons. Individuals are exposed to predation and sibling cannibalism during molting. T. eques is different from other aposematic grasshoppers in its asynchronous molting.

Mating begins about 12 days after maturity, and about 30 days after the adults molt, females begin laying egg pods each containing about 50 eggs. Egg pods are deposited 6 to 9 centimeters underground. Females continue to lay subsequent egg pods at 18-day intervals until they are killed by the freeze in November.

== Behavior ==
=== Thermoregulation ===
Thermoregulation is necessary for all essential life functions of T. eques and most other behaviors, including food consumption and digestion, predator escape, reproduction, walking, flying, and ovipositing. The desert environment of T. eques is often unpredictable and allows the grasshopper only about four months, the time between the onset of the summer rains and the arrival of the winter freeze, to complete its entire life cycle. Growth and development are further slowed by cold desert nights, and in October, cold days. T. eques speed development by solar basking, aided by its black heat-absorbing coloration. By thermoregulating, the grasshopper can maintain an optimal body temperature between 30 and 40 degrees Celsius for most of the day. Elevating body temperature for extended periods allows T. eques to metabolize faster, thus permitting maximum growth and reproduction before the onset of winter. Without thermoregulation, T. eques could not survive in its northern range.

The unique black coloration of T. eques is thermally beneficial, contributing to the species' shorter larval development compared to the light- colored desert grasshoppers. T. eques has also developed behavioral thermoregulatory mechanisms for sunlight exposure. Flanking occurs when the grasshopper orients its body perpendicular to sunlight, maximizing thoracic heat gain. The sun-side hindleg is lowered, the shade-side hindleg is raised, and the abdomen is lowered to reduce wing shading. Moving into the centers of bushes allows for shading to limit sun exposure at midday to prevent overheating.

=== Defense ===
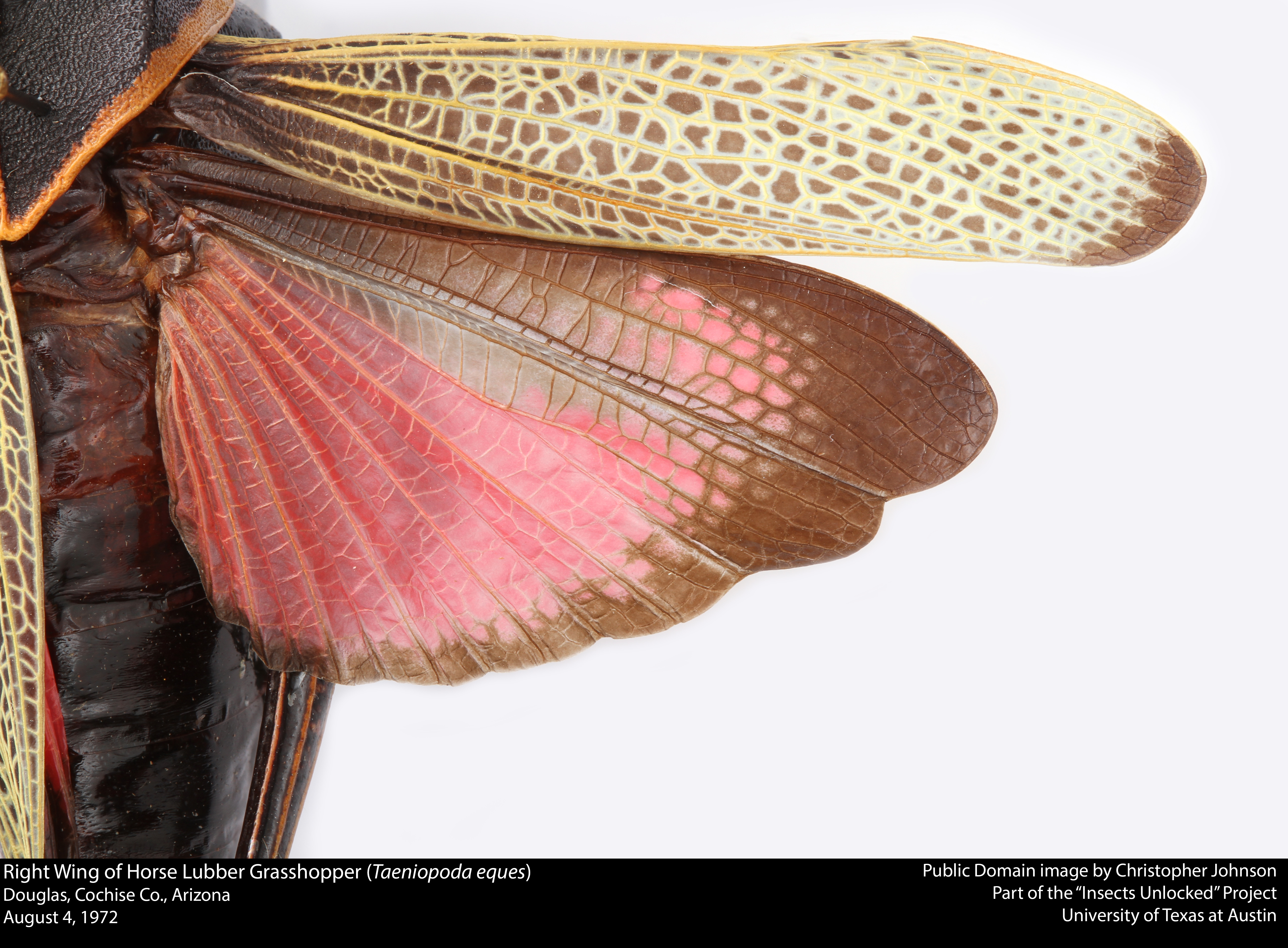
Most individuals have wings that are too small for flight, but they sometimes flash the red colors as a warning

Ants regularly attack hatching and molting nymphs. Vertebrates sharing the habitat of T. eques rarely disturb horse lubbers and prefer other lubber grasshopper species instead. Only invertebrates and grasshopper mice have been shown to be undeterred by adult T. eques toxicity. However, most predatory invertebrates are unable to catch and kill adult T. eques because of their relatively large size.

T. eques possesses a multi-sensory defense system. The chemical secretion has a strong coffee-vanilla odor and composed of a complex mixture of synthesized phenolics and plant toxins produced from the grasshopper's diet. When consumed, the toxic tissues of T. eques cause vomiting or death in predators. The species relies on a comprehensive aposematic display containing chemical deterrents, and visual and auditory elements for defense against vertebrate predators. For example, when attacked by mice, the grasshoppers spray the odorous secretion from their metathoracic spiracles while producing a hissing noise. The secretion surrounds the insect in a noxious deterrent cloud. Adults also turn sideways to predators and display their bright red hindwings while waving their bright antennae and spiny hindlegs in a threatening manner. Together these signals warn naïve predators and remind experienced predators of the grasshopper's toxicity.

=== Social behavior ===
In the first stage of life, pod mates aggregate and move and feed together, but disperse after a few days. Aggregation is tightest in this first-instar period and may be a method of defense for the vulnerable developing grasshoppers. Thereafter they are solitary, although mature T. eques are attracted to the largest bush at dusk which provides the appearance of clumping. This behavior may provide benefits of increasing opportunities for mating and enhancing aposematic displays against predators.

=== Sexual behavior and pheromones ===
Both sexes of mature T. eques engage in promiscuous behavior. Males are sexually aggressive, actively mounting females and males of the species as well as individuals from other grasshopper and lizard species.

Males cautiously stalk females before suddenly mounting without any communicatory leg or wing signaling. Females react violently when mounted by jumping, kicking, running, and rotating from side to side. However, immediately following copulation, females become docile and carry males on their backs. Males do not guard ovipositing females.

The female T. eques releases a pheromone that elicits male attraction and sexual behavior over a short distance. Male T. eques can remain in copulation for up to 24 hours, continuously passing spermatophores to the female.

=== Trait interaction ===
Multiple phenotypic traits interact in T. eques since chemical defense from vertebrates releases the species from the need to be small and hidden. Thus T. eques has evolved a large body size, to increase fecundity, deter small invertebrate predators, increase water retention, and allow for deep ovipositing. However, the large adult size requires long development and growth, which is difficult in its short season. It speeds growth by thermoregulation mechanisms including dark color and solar exposure positions, both allowed only because of chemical defense. These features cause T. eques to be conspicuous; however, chemical deterrents protect it against predators. The species can allocate resources to reproduction instead of wings and flight muscles. As with many other chemically defended insects, T. eques is mostly flightless and sluggish.
