= Thomas Brigham Bishop =

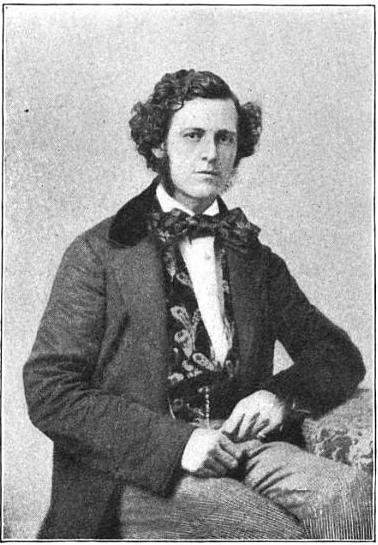
- Thomas Brigham Bishop around 1857
- Born: June 29, 1835; Wayne, Maine, United States
- Died: May 15, 1905 (aged 69); Philadelphia, Pennsylvania, United States
- Resting place: Mount Peace Cemetery
- Occupation: Songwriter
- Spouse: Sarah A. Bishop (1841–1924)

Thomas Brigham Bishop (June 29, 1835 - May 15, 1905) (usually referred to as T. Brigham Bishop) is best known as an American composer of popular music. Various disputed claims have been made by Bishop and others that he authored, or at least contributed to the authorship of, a number of popular 19th-century songs, including John Brown's Body, When Johnny Comes Marching Home, and Shoo Fly, Don't Bother Me. Bishop later had an infamous career as a bucket shop proprietor, among other schemes.

== Background ==
Bishop was born in Wayne, Maine in 1835, and began studying music in Providence, Rhode Island when he was 16. In 1864, he founded a minstrel show in Chattanooga, which lasted until Lincoln's assassination.

== Songs ==
While Bishop did publish a number of songs beginning in the 1850s, disputes have arisen over his authorship claims as to some of the most famous of those compositions. In some cases, it is fairly clear that Bishop was not the original author of the works in dispute. In other cases the facts are not clear.

=== "John Brown's Body" ===
Bishop has often been attributed with authorship of the popular Civil War marching song "John Brown's Body", though that claim is widely disputed. The melody of the song was famously also used for The Battle Hymn of the Republic. In 1916, Bishop's friend John J. MacIntyre published a short book promoting Bishop's authorship of John Brown's Body and other songs, boldly called The Composer of the Battle Hymn of the Republic. MacIntyre also promoted Bishop's authorship claims in 1935, for the 100th anniversary of Bishop's birth, which was featured in an article in Time magazine.

Bishop's story of the genesis of the song is that it grew out of a conversation with his brother-in-law around 1858, who "took me to task, remarking that my songs were all written for the devil. Then he said 'I am bound to be a soldier in the army of the Lord.' Glory, Glory, Hallelujah!'" This, according to Bishop, inspired him to the melody and lyrics, and he later modified the lyrics after John Brown's death at Harper's Ferry in 1859. Bishop claimed he first published the song with John Church of Cincinnati in 1861.

=== "When Johnny Comes Marching Home" ===
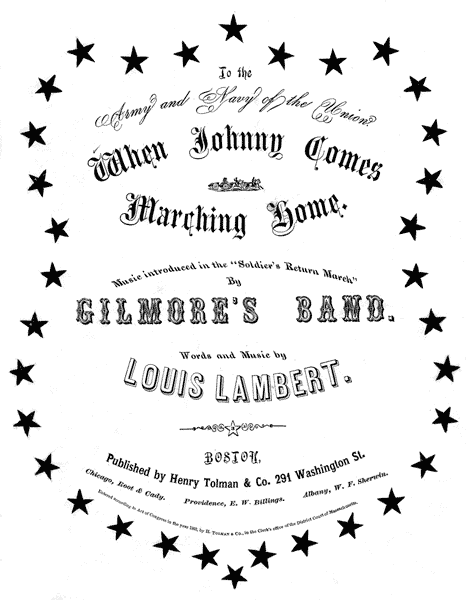
Sheet music cover page for "When Johnny Comes Marching Home" (1863), attributed to "Louis Lambert"

The Civil-War tune "When Johnny Comes Marching Home" is usually attributed to composer and bandmaster Patrick Gilmore (though from a melody derived from the older Irish song Johnny I Hardly Knew Ye), but other attributions to Bishop have also been made. According to Bishop, he wrote the melody for the song in 1850, as "Johnny, Fill Up the Bowl," Gilmore wrote new lyrics for it in 1863, and both brought the song to their publisher, who reportedly suggested that the Lambert pseudonym be used on the sheet music.

=== "Shoo Fly, Don't Bother Me" ===
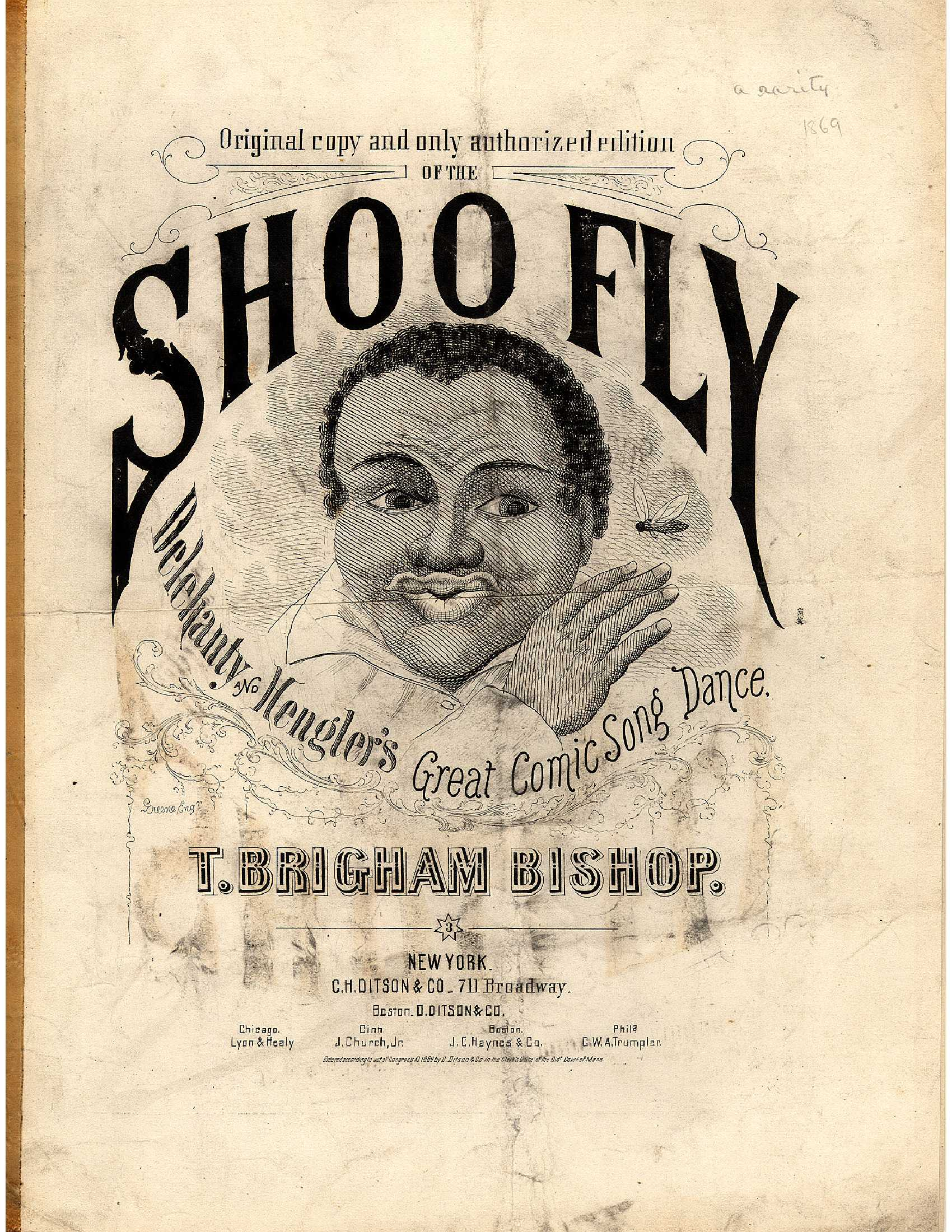
Sheet music cover page for "Shoo Fly" (1869)

According to Bishop's account, he wrote "Shoo Fly, Don't Bother Me" during the Civil War while assigned to command a company of black soldiers. One of the soldiers, dismissing some remarks of his fellow soldiers, exclaimed "Shoo fly, don't bother me," which inspired Bishop to write the song. The company, we are told, generated the line "I belong to Company G". Yet, the song was reportedly "pirated" from Bishop and he made little money from it. Bishop did publish a sheet music version of the song in 1869, which includes the caption, "Original Copy and Only Authorized Edition." Other sources, however, have credited Billy Reeves (lyrics) and Frank Campbell, or Rollin Howard, with the song. The first group to popularize the song was Bryant's Minstrels in 1869–70.

=== MacIntyre's reporting ===
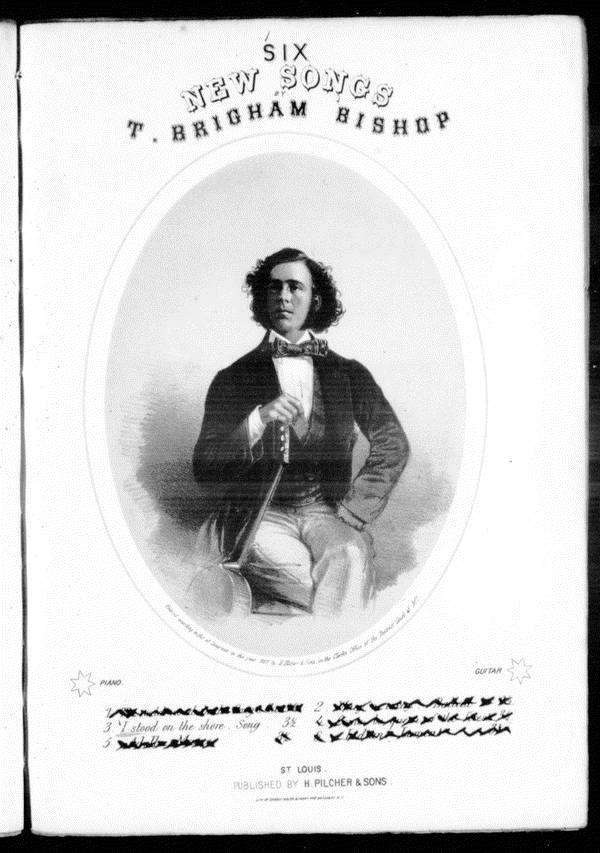
Cover to sheet music for "Six new songs" by Bishop, published by H. Pilcher and Sons, St. Louis, 1857.

Writer John J. MacIntyre's 1916 short book, The Composer of the Battle Hymn of the Republic, about Bishop's songs, appears to be written largely based on Bishop's self-reporting to MacIntyre many years after the fact. MacIntrye reports therein that he first met Bishop in 1897 in New York.

Perhaps the most amazing of the claims in the book is that Bishop had a small part in the writing of one of the Stephen Foster's best known songs, Old Folks at Home ("Swanee River"). Bishop claims that he ran into Foster in a music publishing house, where Foster had already composed the lyrics and basic melody, and whistled it to Bishop, who "put it down" on paper for him, and arranged it for piano by adding basic chords. Then, according to Bishop, famed blackface performer E.P. Christy walked in, heard the song, and paid Foster $30 for it on the spot. Thus, the song was attributed to E.P. Christy when it was published (which, at the very least, is true; the original sheet music, dated 1851, attributes authorship to Christy). If any of this story was true, Bishop would have been only about 16 years old at the time of this event, and it contradicts other sources which make no mention of Bishop.

== Business endeavors ==
By the 1880s, Bishop became engaged in the "bucket shop" business—essentially a betting business based on the stock market. Bishop reportedly became the "leader" of the shady (and eventually illegal) trade in New York City, and also specialized in female customers.

Bishop was arrested in mid-1890 for charges arising out of legal proceedings brought against him for taking $2,000 from a Julie E. Hetsch in 1885, but was able to skip town once bond was posted. He was again arrested in Jersey City, New Jersey in November 1891 and placed in Ludlow Street Jail, where the New York Times critique of Bishop's financial career was withering: "Bishop has had a long career as a confidence man, bunko steerer, and general crook. He has made Massachusetts, Ohio, and Florida too hot to hold him."

In 1881, Bishop built a 200-room hotel near Silver Springs, Florida. After fires in 1894/95, he rebuilt on the site as the "Brown House." Also in Florida, he helped found the Palatka National Bank, which failed after a few years.

In 1901, Bishop was embroiled in yet another scheme, this time promoting the "New England Wireless Telephone Company", which was one of a number of companies formed as a supposed competitor to Marconi, which were later exposed as a fraud.

== Personal life and death ==
In 1867, Bishop married "Sarah A.", who was possibly a former actress. From 1886 to 1894, they had a house in Dundee Park, New Jersey.

Bishop died in Philadelphia on May 15, 1905, suffering from locomotor ataxia. As one Florida obituary of Bishop noted (while detailing Bishop's various exploits), "by the death in Philadelphia last week of Thomas Brigham Bishop, a curiously picturesque and extraordinary career extending more than half a century was closed."

Bishop was buried in Mount Peace Cemetery in Philadelphia. His widow Sarah died in 1924 and was interred with him.

== Other notable songs ==
- "If Your Foot Is Pretty, Show It" (1857) - Has been credited to Bishop, though the original 1857 sheet music only lists Bishop as "composer" and does not identify the author of the lyrics.
- "Kittie Wells" (1861) - Has been credited to Bishop, but it was published twice previously, by Charles E. Atherton in 1858, and Thomas Sloan Jr. in 1860.
- "Sweet Evelina" (1863). Has been attributed to Bishop as composer, the song was first published in 1863 as "words by M." and "melody by T."
- "Leaf by Leaf the Roses Fall" (1865). The lyrics to this song were penned by Caroline Dana Howe in 1856. It appears Bishop originally claimed complete authorship of the song, but when confronted with proof that the lyrics were from a poem by Howe, he gave full credit for the lyrics to her and made sure credit was given to her in future publications of the song.
- "Pretty as a Picture" (1872) (lyrics by George Cooper)
- "On the Down Hill of Life"
