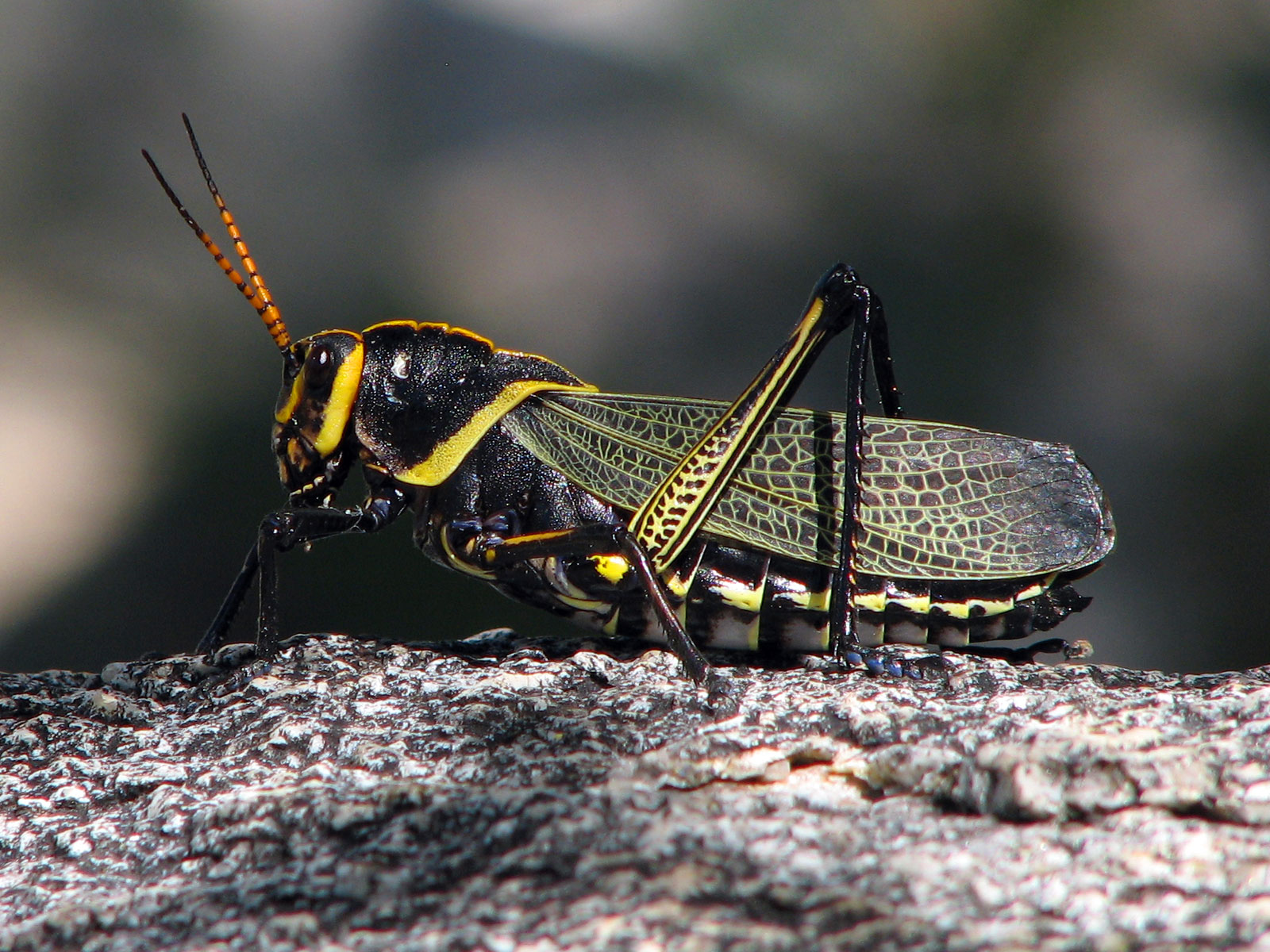
- Taeniopoda eques

Scientific classification
- Kingdom: Animalia
- Phylum: Arthropoda
- Clade: Pancrustacea
- Class: Insecta
- Order: Orthoptera
- Suborder: Caelifera
- Family: Romaleidae
- Subfamily: Romaleinae
- Tribe: Romaleini
- Genus: Taeniopoda; Stål, 1873

= Taeniopoda =

Genus of grasshoppers

Taeniopoda is a genus of horse lubbers, fairly large grasshoppers in the family Romaleidae that are native to southwestern United States, Mexico and Central America. There are about 12 described species in Taeniopoda. Taeniopoda is very closely related to Romalea (members of the two genera can even produce fertile hybrids in captivity), leading some recent authorities to consider the former a junior synonym the latter.

== Species ==
These 12 species belong to the genus Taeniopoda:

- Taeniopoda auricornis (Walker, 1870)
- Taeniopoda bicristata Bruner, 1907
- Taeniopoda centurio (Drury, 1770)
- Taeniopoda citricornis Bruner, 1907
- Taeniopoda eques (Burmeister, 1838) (horse lubber)
- Taeniopoda gutturosa Bolívar, 1901
- Taeniopoda obscura Bruner, 1907
- Taeniopoda picticornis (Walker, 1870)
- Taeniopoda reticulata (Fabricius, 1781)
- Taeniopoda stali Bruner, 1907
- Taeniopoda tamaulipensis Rehn, 1904
- Taeniopoda varipennis Rehn, 1905

== Taeniopoda reticulata ==
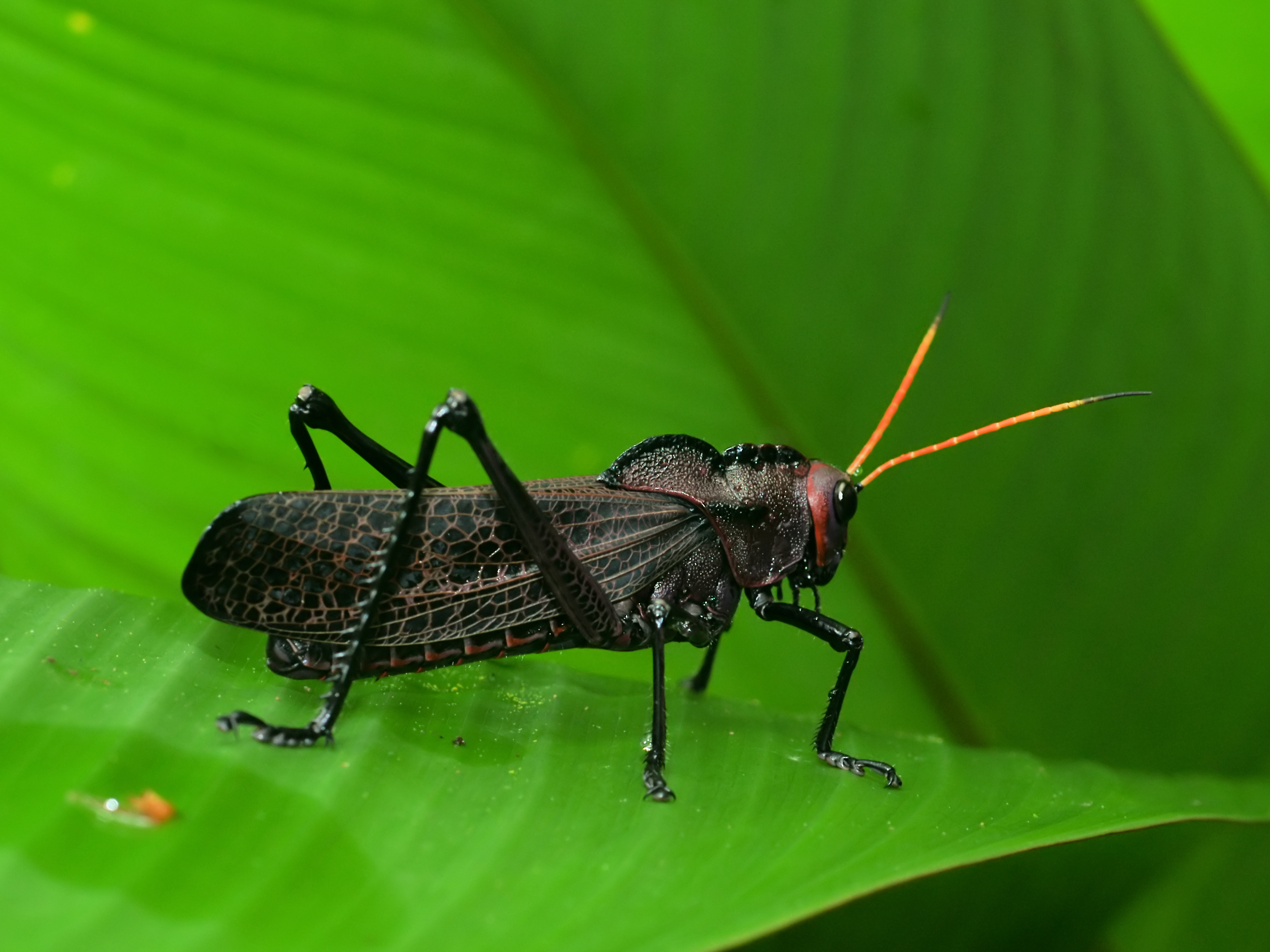
Taeniopoda reticulata

Taeniopoda reticulata is a purplish grasshopper that has red antennas and is about 2 inches long. It has black stripes leave like pattern on wings coverings, legs and body. A bright crimson red on wings is displayed, it has eyed like pattern when both wings are opened on flight as a defense mechanism.

In Costa Rica is more often seen from early June to July at its nymphal stage to fully matured, crawling around the banana plantations on the Caribbean slope.
