= Shoo Fly, Don't Bother Me =

Song

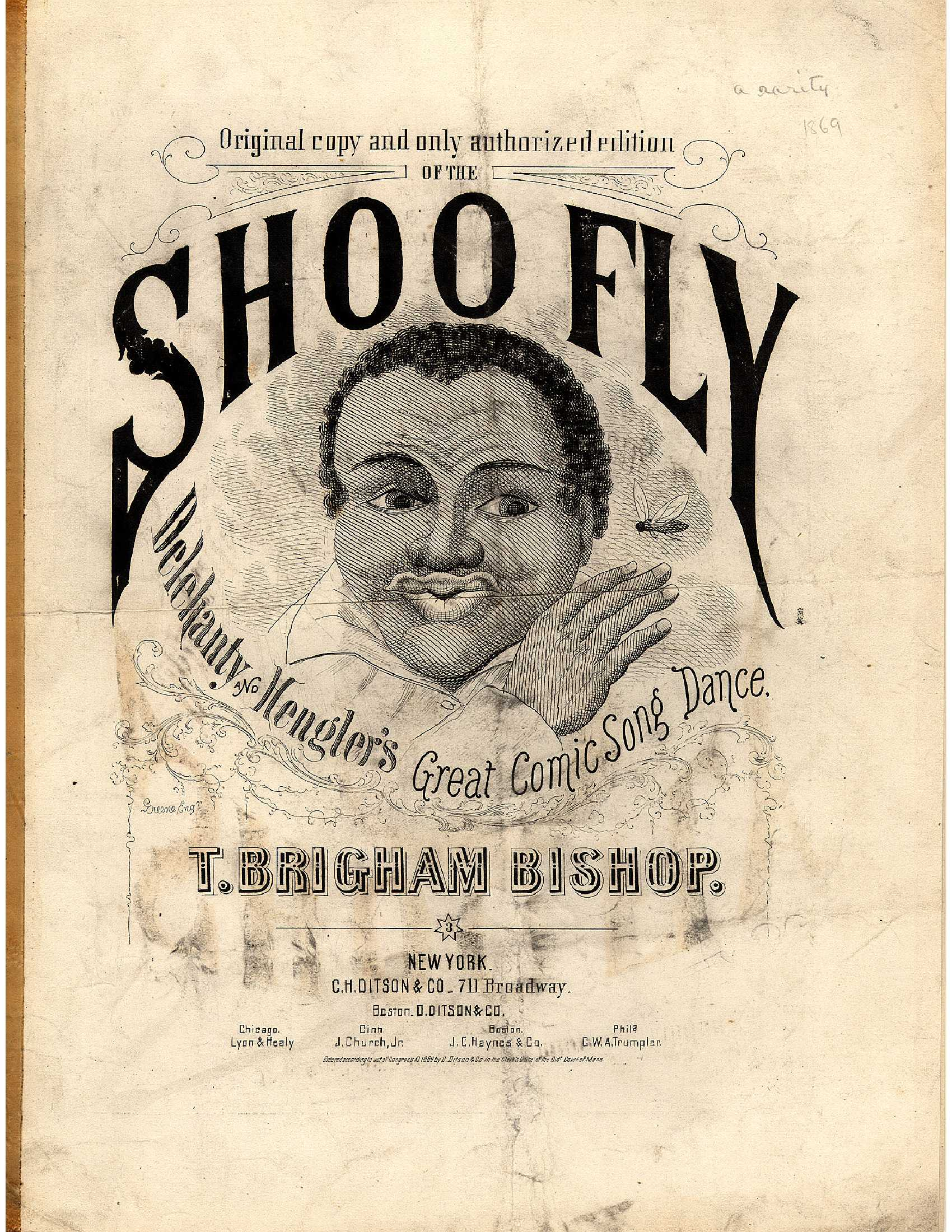

Song
- Written: 1869
- Genre: Children's folk
- Songwriter: Thomas Bishop
- Composer: Thomas Bishop
- Lyricist: Billy Reeves

Shoo Fly, Don't Bother Me or Shew Fly is a folk song from the 1860s that has remained popular since that time. It was sung by soldiers during the Spanish–American War of 1898, when flies and the yellow fever mosquito were a serious enemy. Today, it is most commonly sung by children.

== Composition ==
The song became popular on the minstrel stage in 1869, and several claims have been made for its composition. An anonymously written 1895 New York Herald article on the history of minstrel show dancing gave this history:

'Shoo-Fly' is said to have come originally from the Isthmus of Panama, where the black people sang 'Shoo Fly' and 'Don't Bodder Me' antiphonally while at their work. A black person from there, Helen Johnson, took it first to California and taught the song to 'Billy' Birch [a performer with the San Francisco Minstrels troupe]. ‘Dick’ Carroll and others also had versions of it which they performed. Delehanty and Hengler had theirs, too, and used to sing it as an encore with Bryant’s Minstrels, slipping on old dresses over their heads in the interim of the score. It was from hearing them that ‘Dave’ [Reed] and ‘Dan’ [Bryant] fancied the song. ‘Dave’ fixed it up with a dance, and original version thereof. It was rehearsed secretly, and when the time came they ‘sprang it’ on ‘the boys’ of the company one evening in public, with ‘Come and Kiss Me’ as an encore. It was a howling success from the start, and ‘Dan’ Bryant had printed the next day at the Herald office twenty thousand notices, which he gave to the company and others to scatter about the town wherever they went. Horse shoes with a fly on them were put in odd and conspicuous places, even on the telegraph wires, and in no time the public was crazy over the act and 'business was great.' E.M. Hall has a version with a more elaborate and an excellent chorus, ending 'Shoo Fly, &c., "Go 'way, fly, I'll cut your wing.”'.

Theater historian Eugene Cropsey also credited Dan Bryant with introducing the song to the public in October 1869. The version sung by Bryant's Minstrels served, in 1869, as the title number in Dan Bryant’s Shoo Fly Songster.

"Shoo Fly" is among the songs ("John Brown's Body" is another) claimed as compositions by T. Brigham Bishop. According to Bishop's account, he wrote "Shoo Fly, Don't Bother Me" during the Civil War while assigned to command a company of black soldiers. One of the soldiers, dismissing some remarks of his fellow soldiers, exclaimed "Shoo fly, don't bother me," which inspired Bishop to write the song, including in the lyrics the unit's designation, "Company G". Bishop claimed that the song was "pirated" from him, and that he made little money from it. Bishop published a sheet music version of the song in 1869 (White, Smith & Perry). That version includes the caption, "Original Copy and Only Authorized Edition."

Other sources have credited Billy Reeves (lyrics) and Frank Campbell, or Rollin Howard, with the song. An early publication appeared as "Shew! Fly, Don't Bother Me. Comic Song and Dance or Walk Round. Sung by Cool Burgess and Rollin Howard, melody by Frank Campbell, words by Billy Reeves, arr. by Rollin Howard."

== Lyrics ==
One version of the song, recorded in 1889, runs:

I feel, I feel, I feel,
I feel like a morning star.
I feel, I feel, I feel,
I feel like a morning star.

Shoo fly, don't bother me,
Shoo fly, don't bother me,
Shoo fly, don't bother me,
I belong to the Company G.

There's music in the air,
My mother said to me;
There's music in the air,
My mother said to me.

Shoo fly, don't bother me,
Shoo fly, don't bother me,
Shoo fly, don't bother me,
I belong to the Company G.

Other versions include verses such as:

I think I hear the angels sing,
I think I hear the angels sing,
I think I hear the angels sing,
The angels now are on the wing.
I feel, I feel, I feel,
That's what my mother said.
The angels pouring 'lasses down,
Upon this nigger's head.

Today, it is often only the chorus that is sung.

== See also ==
- John Brown's Body
- When Johnny Comes Marching Home
