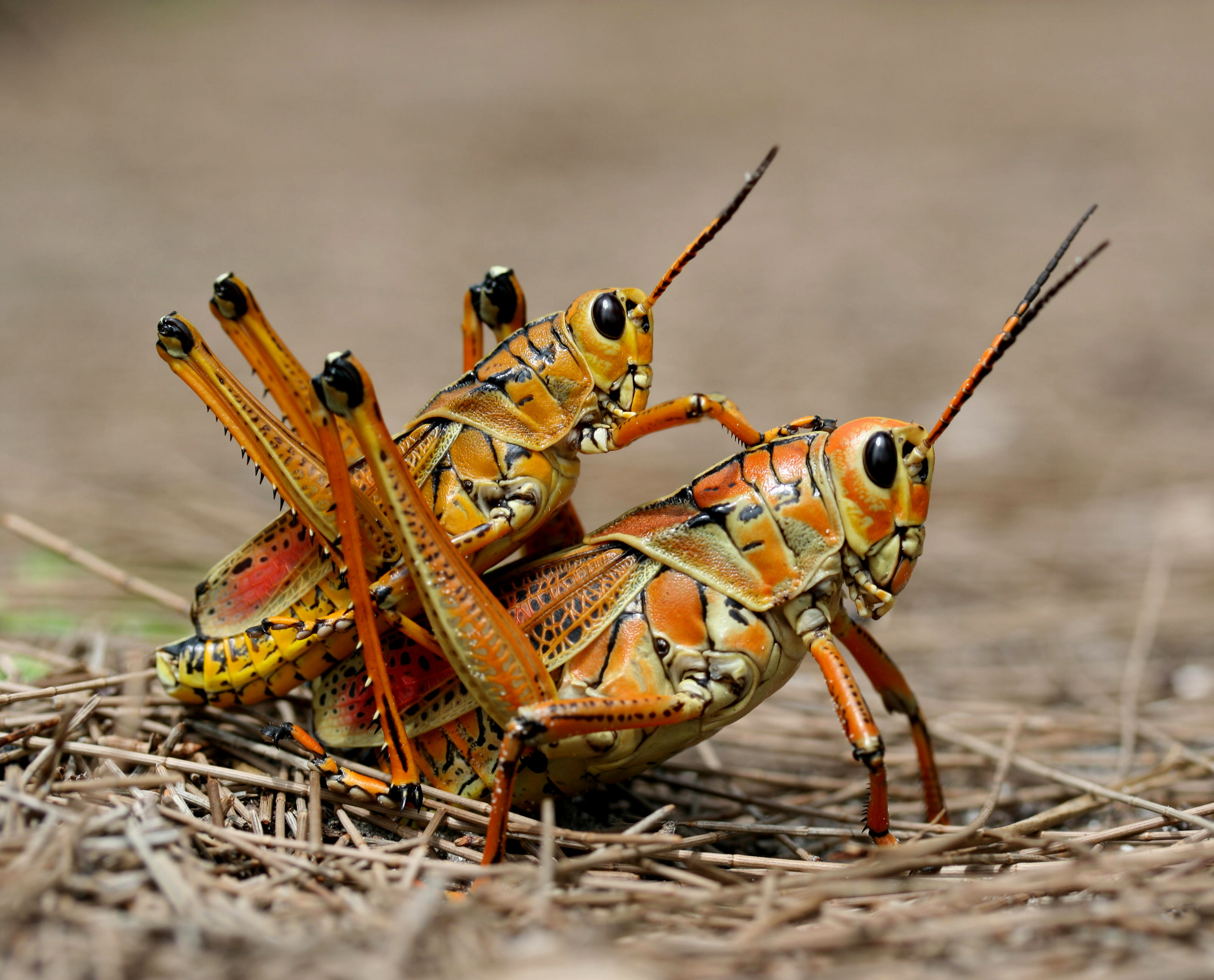
- R. microptera, mating

Conservation status
- Secure (NatureServe)

Scientific classification
- Kingdom: Animalia
- Phylum: Arthropoda
- Clade: Pancrustacea
- Class: Insecta
- Order: Orthoptera
- Suborder: Caelifera
- Family: Romaleidae
- Subfamily: Romaleinae
- Tribe: Romaleini
- Genus: Romalea; Serville, 1831
- Species: R. microptera

Binomial name
- Romalea microptera (Palisot de Beauvois, 1817)

Synonyms
- Rhomalea gigantea Burmeister, 1838; Romalea gloveri Kirby, 1910; Romalea guttata (Stoll, 1813); Romalea marci Serville, 1838; Dictyophorus reticulatus (Thunberg, 1815)

= Romalea =

Genus of grasshoppers

Romalea is a genus of grasshoppers native to the Southeastern and South-central United States. As traditionally defined, it contains a single species, Romalea microptera, known commonly as the Georgia thumper, eastern lubber grasshopper, Florida lubber, or Florida lubber grasshopper, although some recent authorities regard Taeniopoda as a junior synonym, in which case there are about a dozen Romalea species in the southern United States, Mexico and Central America.

R. microptera is one of the most distinctive grasshopper species within the Southeastern US, and is well known for its relatively large size and its unique coloration.

== Taxonomy ==
Romalea is the type genus of the family Romaleidae and tribe Romaleini. It has been suggested that the valid name for Romalea microptera is Romalea guttata. However, microptera has been marked as a nomen protectum by the ICZN, making guttata a synonym.

As traditionally defined, Romalea only contains the species R. microptera, but recent authorities regard Taeniopoda as a synonym, in which case there are about a dozen Romalea species. Romalea and Taeniopoda have generally been separated based on color and pronotum, but more comprehensive morphological data and genetic data do not support their separation. Their wild distributions do not overlap, but in captivity R. microptera can produce fertile hybrids at least with T. eques (western horse lubber grasshopper), showing their very close relations.

== Life cycle ==
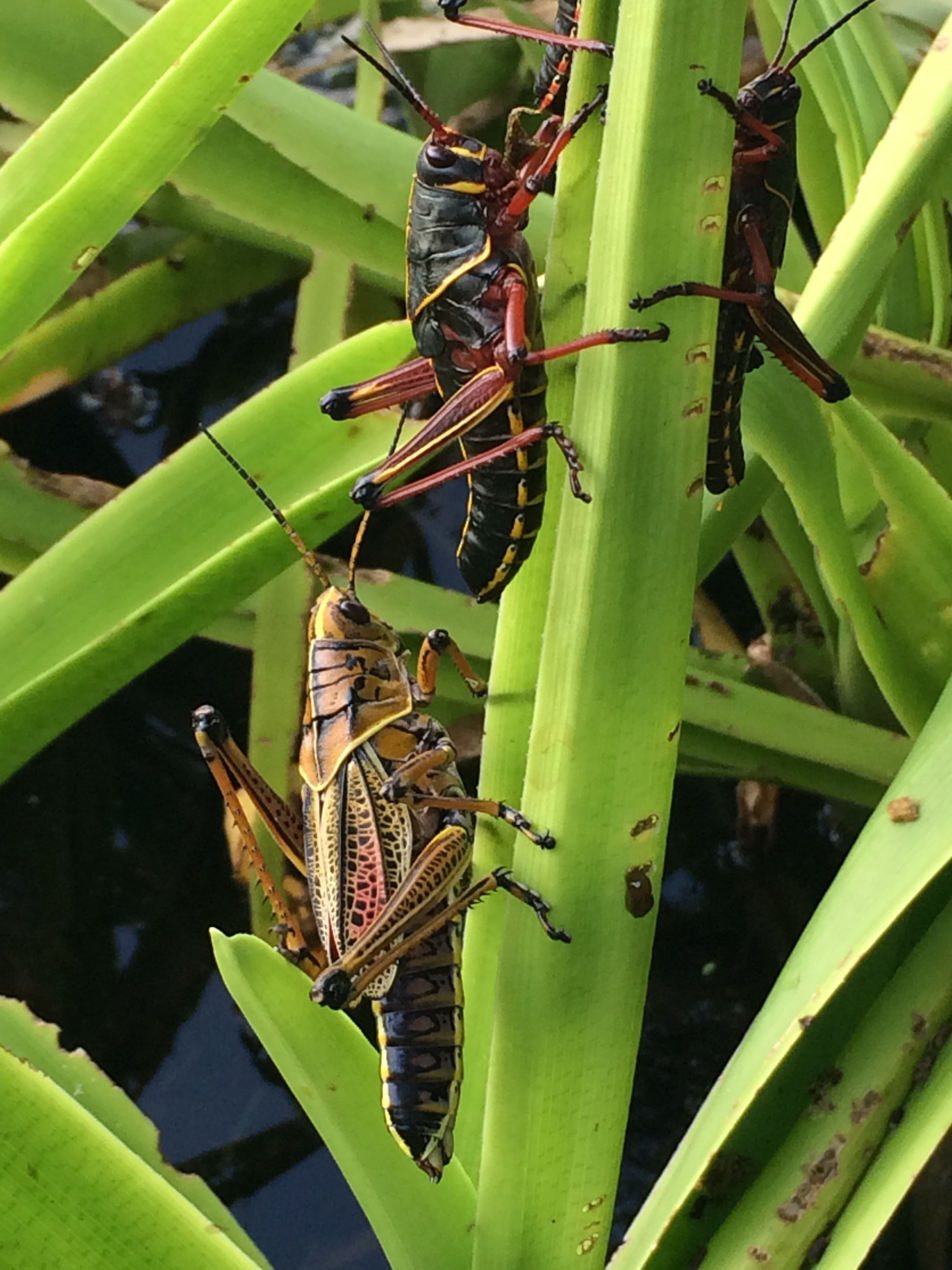
Adult stage (bottom) and nymph stage (top)

R. microptera grows through several stages, like all insects. When in the nymph stage, it is smaller than in the adult stage, wingless, and completely black except for one or more yellow, orange, or red stripes. The adult stage has wings that are half the length of its body, and become either a dull yellow often characterized by black spots and markings, a bright orange with black markings, or entirely black (as in the nymph stage) with yellow or red striping. In the black adult color phase, the grasshopper is widely known by the name "diablo" or "black diablo". In Louisiana, they are known as the "devil's horse" or cheval-diable. The insect is also colloquially known as a "graveyard grasshopper". In Mississippi, they are known as the "giant locust".

== Range ==
R. microptera inhabits regions west of North Carolina to Tennessee, in Georgia, Alabama, Mississippi, Louisiana, Arkansas, and Texas, and throughout Florida. They live in open pinewoods, weedy vegetation, and weedy fields.

== Size and wings ==
R. microptera and Taeniopoda eques (western horse lubber grasshopper) are the largest grasshoppers in the United States. Adult males of R. microptera typically are 4.3–5.5 cm (1.7–2.2 in) long and adult females 5–7 cm (2.0–2.8 in) long, but can exceptionally reach 9 cm (3.5 in). Their wings are rarely half the length of the abdomen; most of the time, they are much smaller, and cannot be used for flight.

== Defense ==
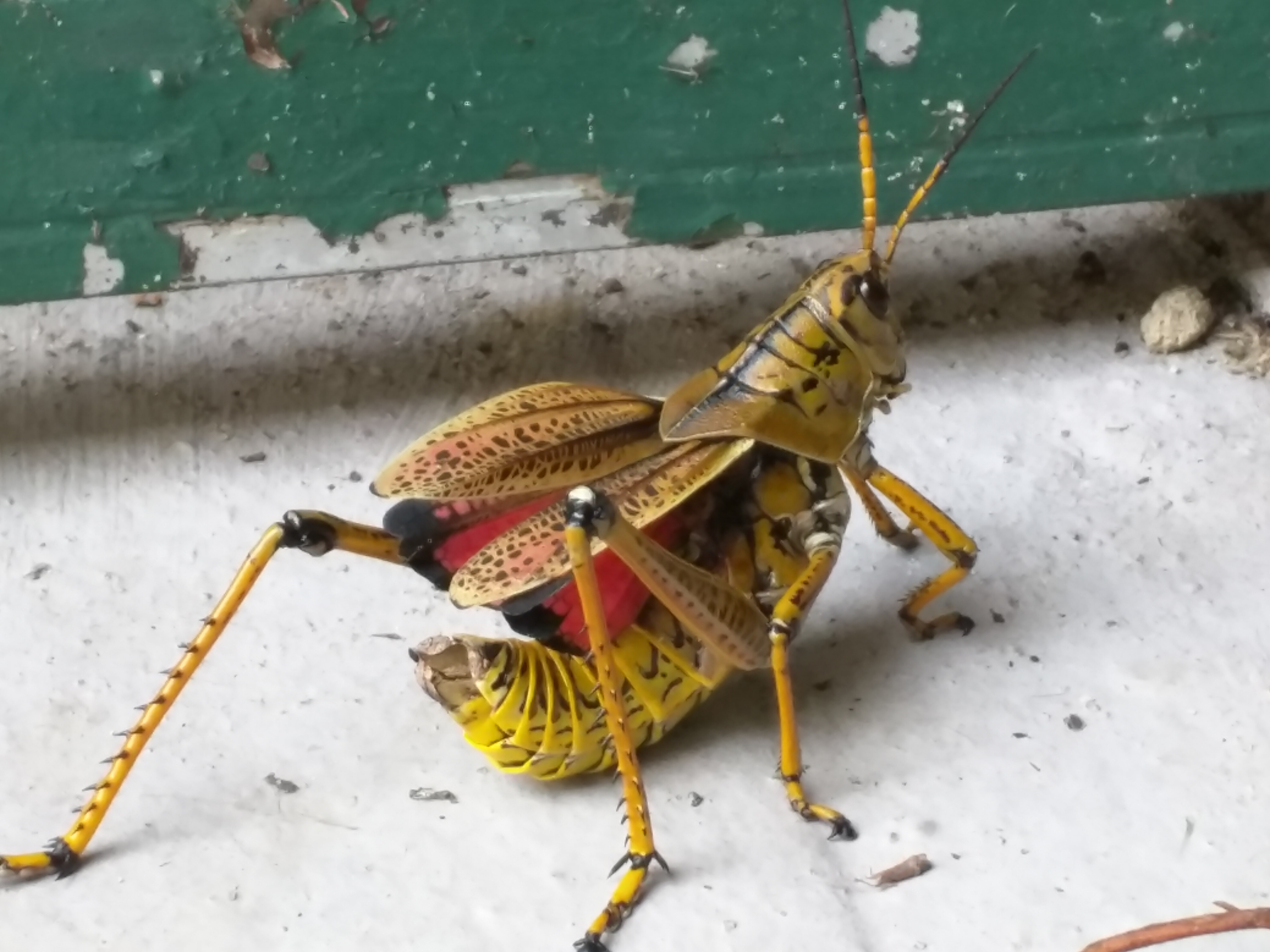
Eastern lubber grasshopper expanding its wings

R. microptera has several defense strategies. The first is its brightly colored pattern (aposematism) to warn predators that it is unpleasant tasting. The second is that it emits a foul-smelling and foul-tasting, foamy secretion from its thorax when it is disturbed. The secretion is dark colored and opaque. The final strategy is that it lets off a loud hissing sound which can scare animals. Whereas most predatory vertebrates avoid R. microptera because of its toxicity, this does not protect it from predatory invertebrates; however, most predatory invertebrates are unable to catch and kill adult R. microptera because of its relatively large size.

== Research ==
A quantitative analysis of the distribution of tritium labeled DNA among chromosomes during meiosis in Romalea microptera led to the conclusion that most exchanges reflected breakage and reciprocal exchange between (non-sister) homologous chromatids.

== Gallery ==
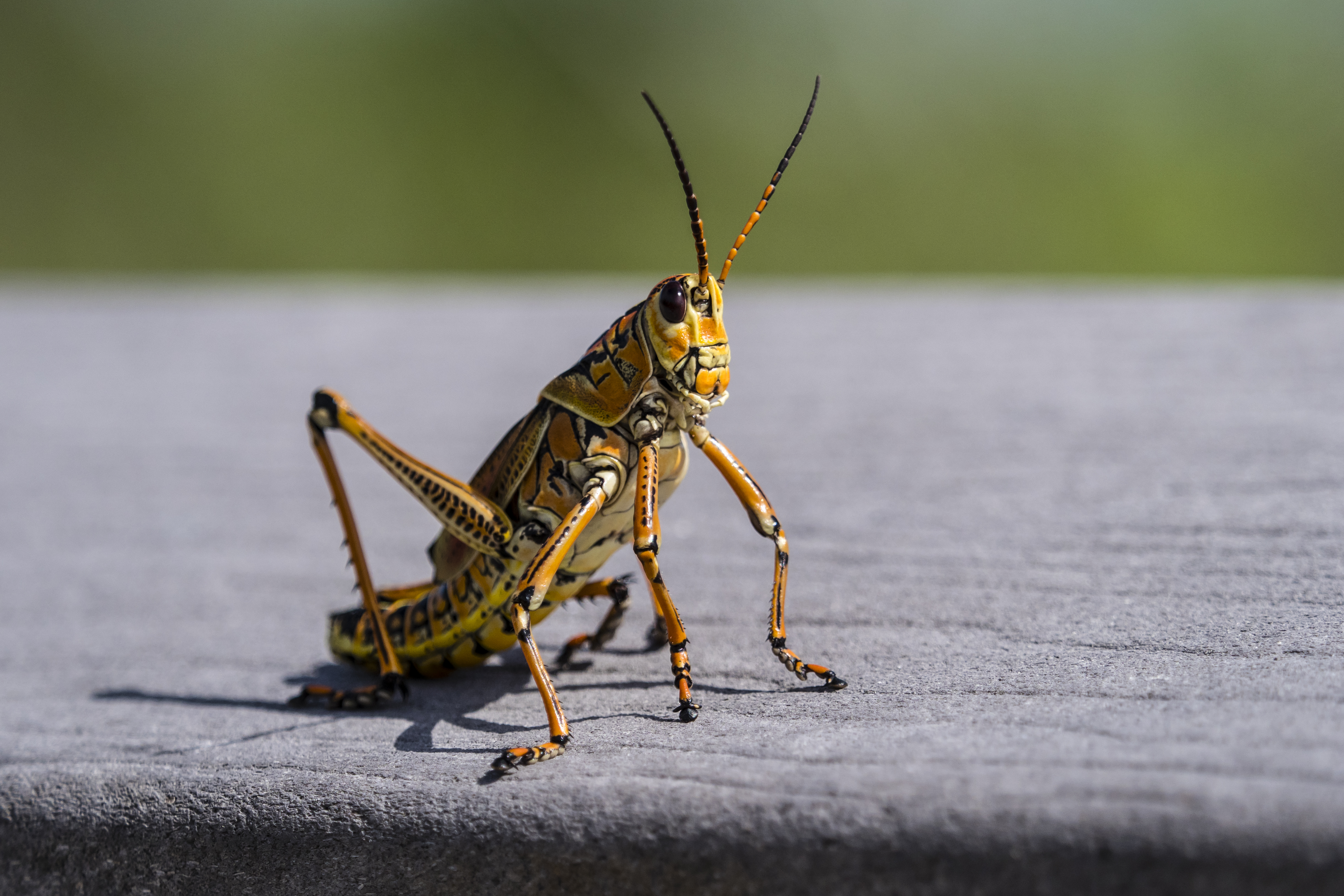
Female eastern lubber grasshopper (R. microptera) in Everglades National Park, Florida

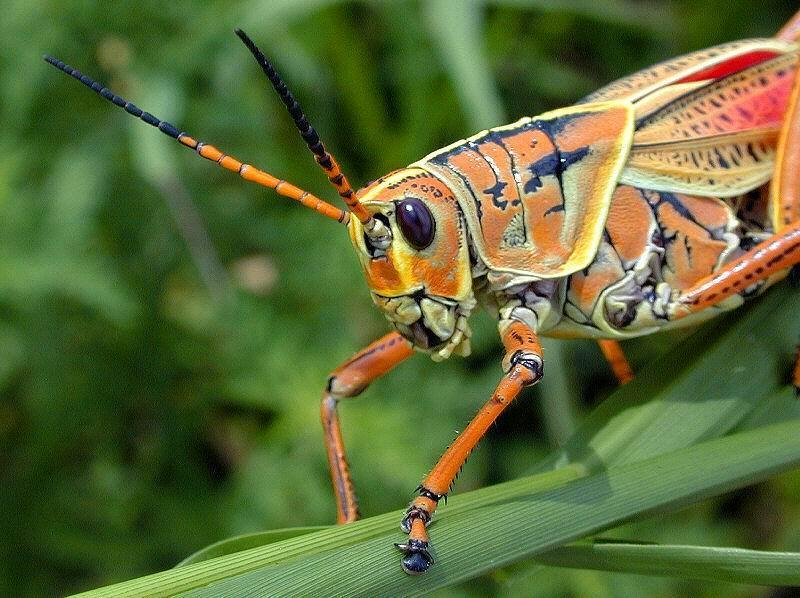
Close-up of R. microptera from the Everglades

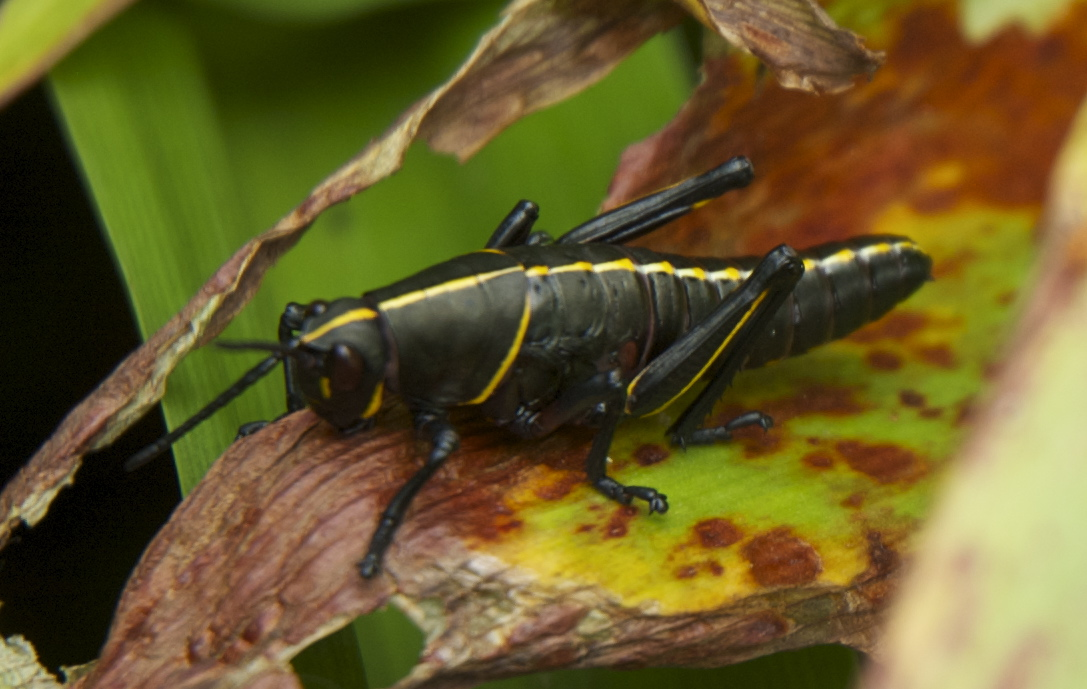
Nymph R. microptera with its characteristic black and yellow-striped body

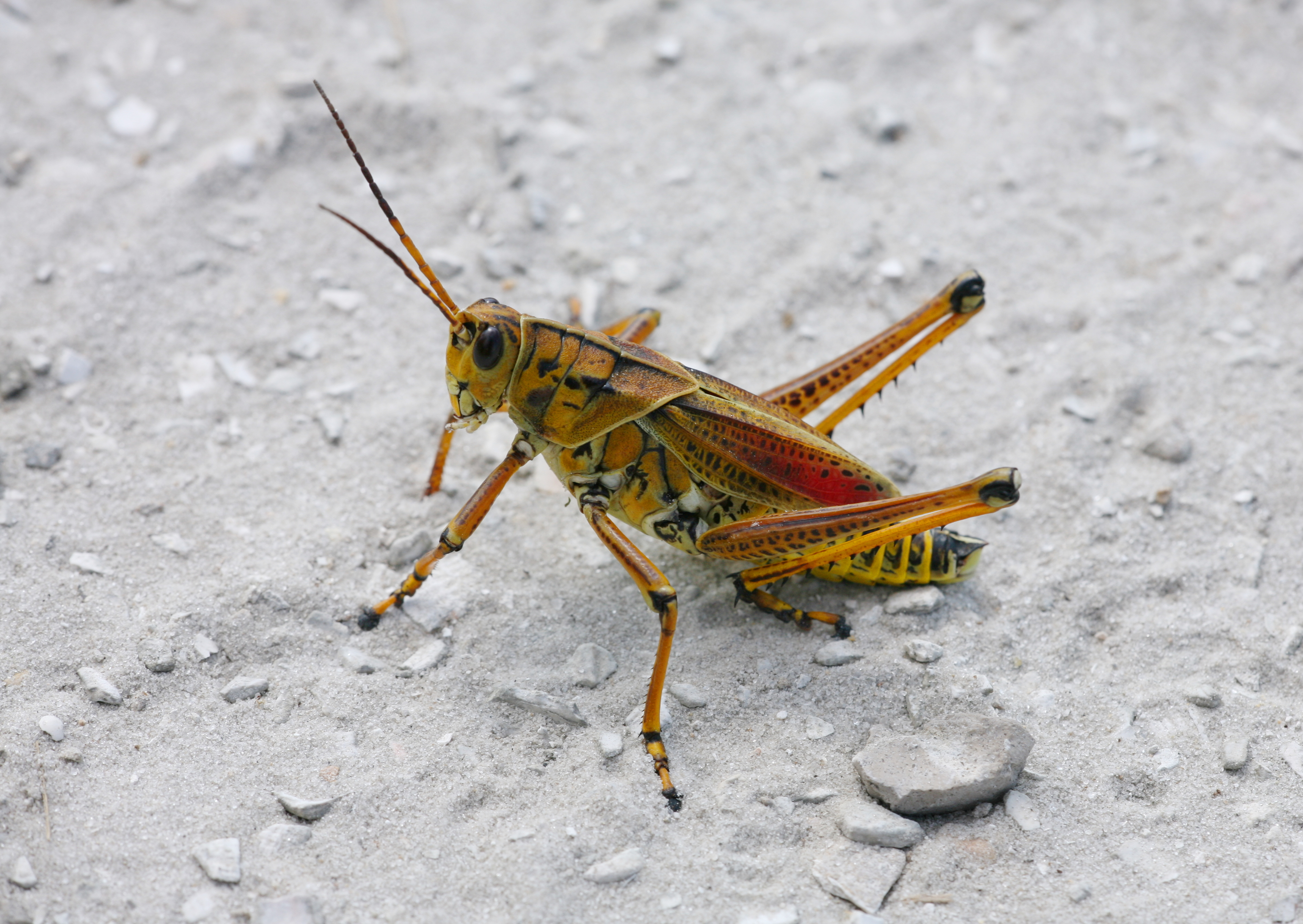
Lubber grasshopper, Loxahatchee National Wildlife Refuge, Delray, Florida

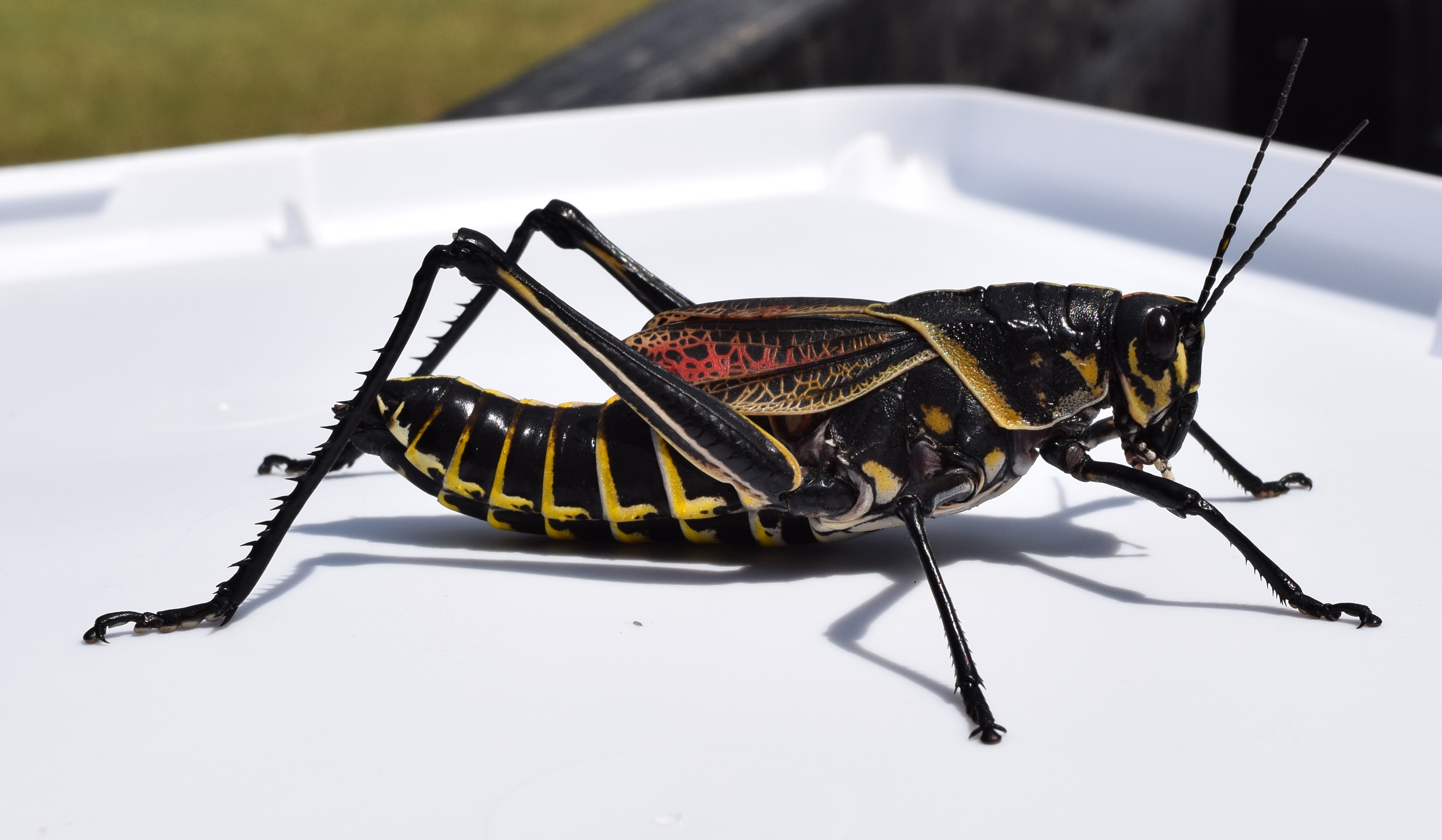
Adult dark morph, University of Mississippi Field Station

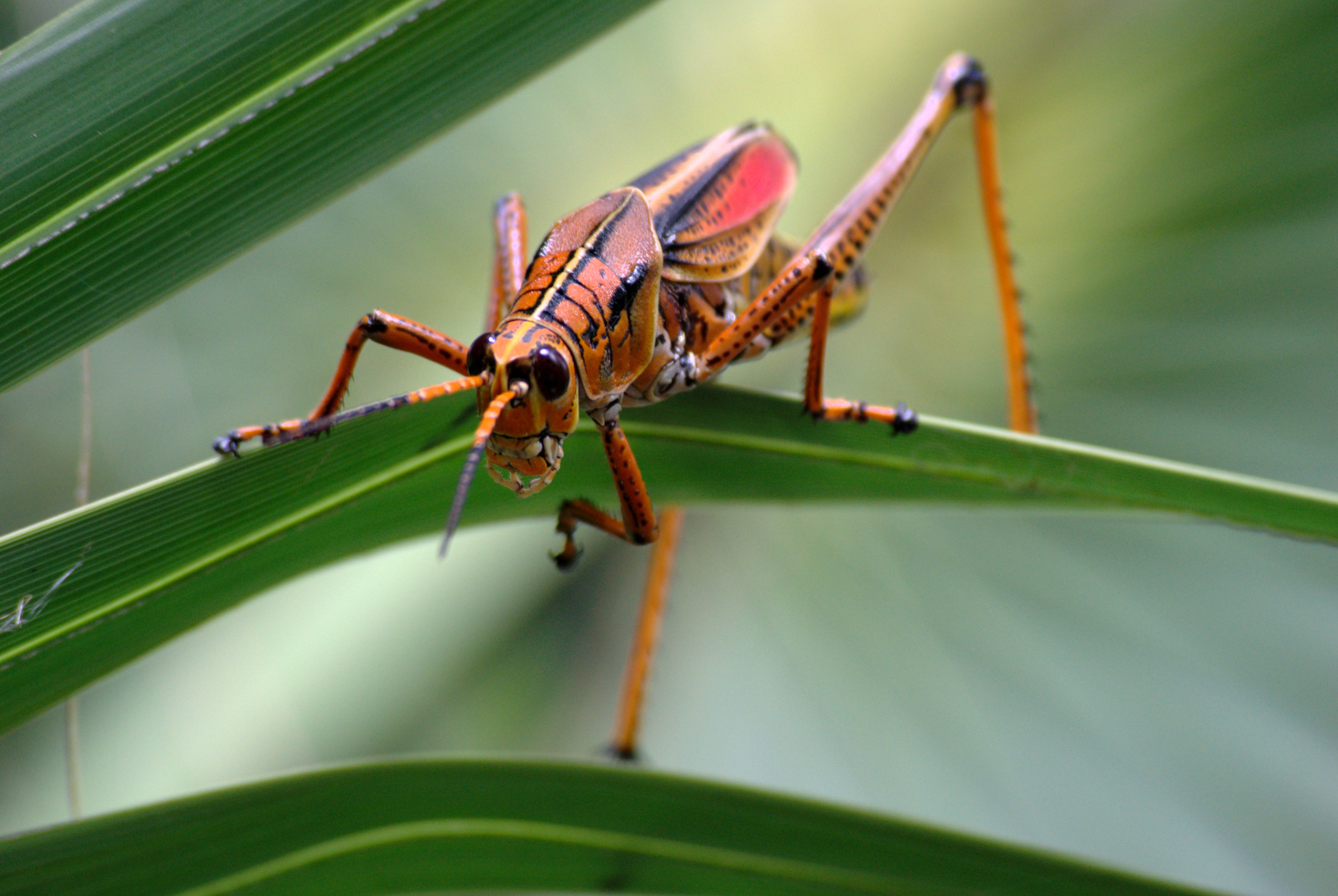
R. microptera, Fort Myers, Florida

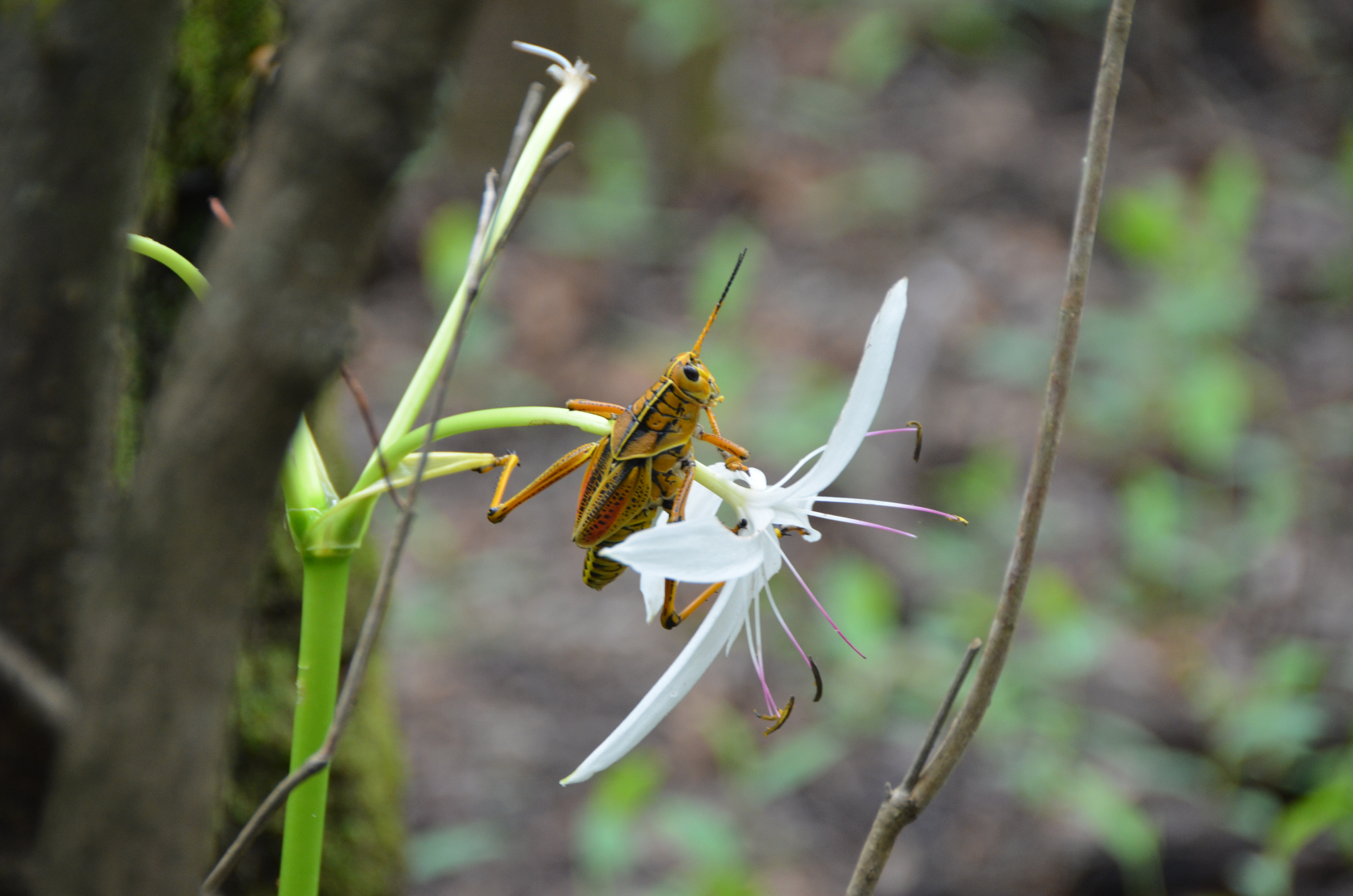
R. microptera at Bear Island Campground in the Big Cypress National Preserve

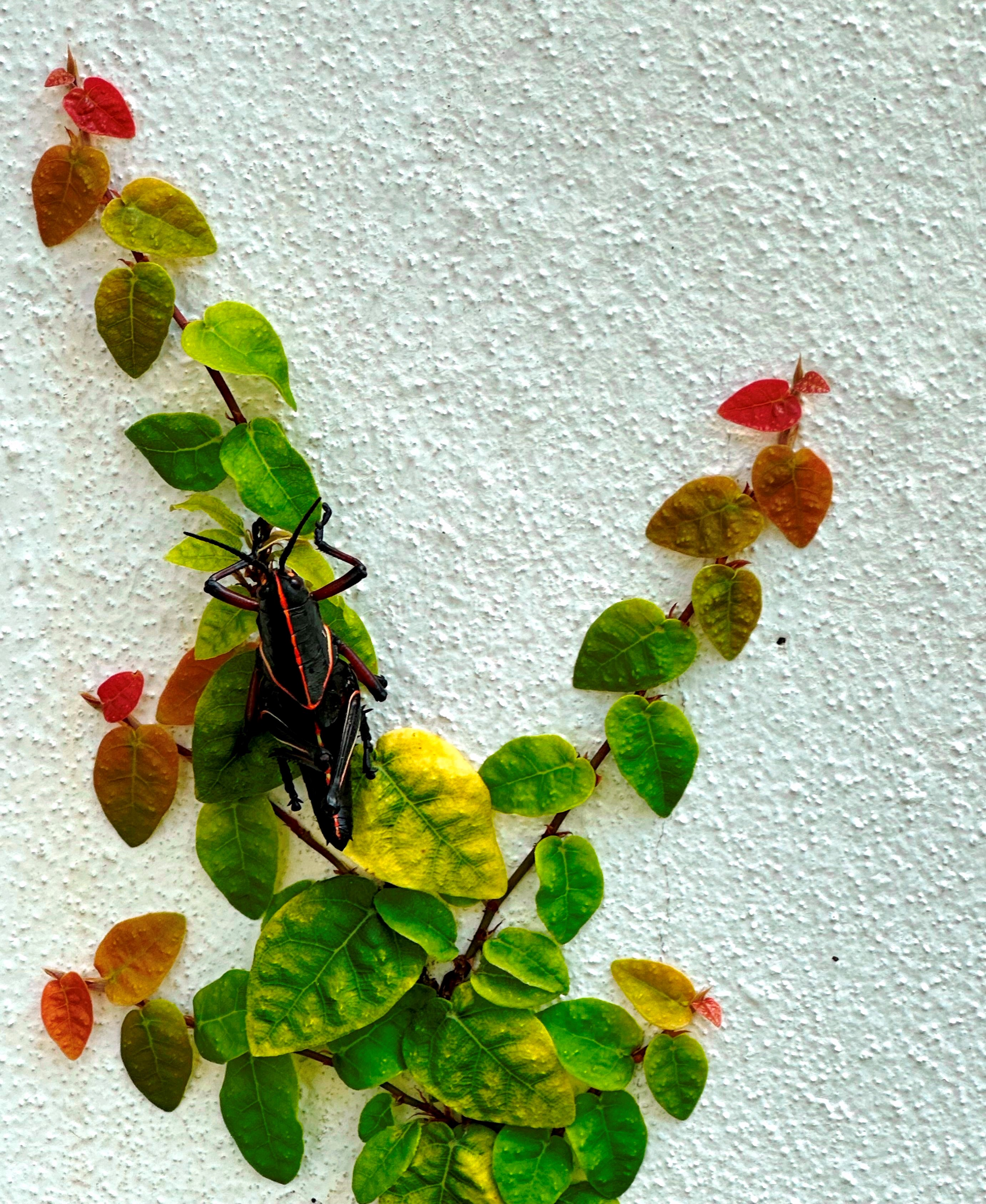
Louisiana Romalea Grasshopper From Louisiana Wetlands, Lake Pontchartrain.
