= Ebenezer G. B. Holder =

19th-century American minstrel performer and composer

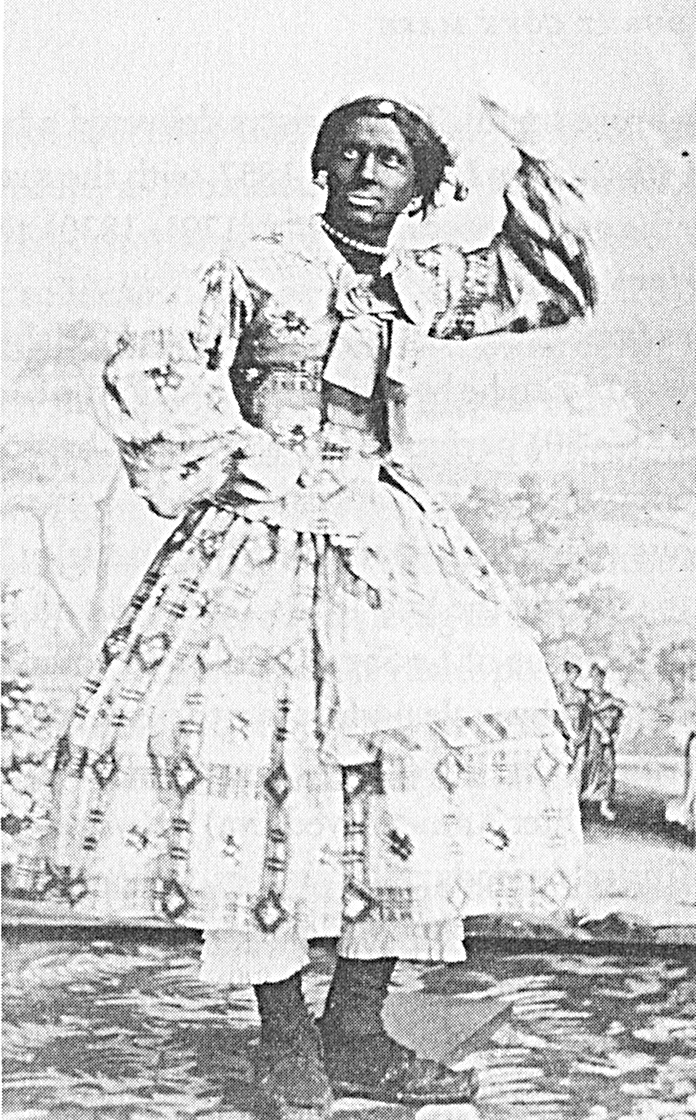
Holder in his persona of Rollin Howard.

Ebenezer G. B. Holder (c. 1840 - June 19, 1879) was an American minstrel performer, composer, and songwriter. As a composer and songwriter he published under the name E. G. B. Holder and created works for both minstrel shows and musicals. His musical Shamus O'Brien was staged on Broadway in 1868. As a performer, he was known on the stage as Rollin Howard and achieved fame as a female impersonator in blackface under that name.

== Life and career ==
Ebenezer G.B. Holder was born in New York City around 1840, and appeared in minstrel productions from approximately 1860 to 1870. He appeared in other dramatic performances both before and after his minstrel period. After the American Civil War, female impersonators became more common in minstrel shows, and Howard was considered one of the leading performers in such roles, along with Francis Leon and Eugene d'Amelie.

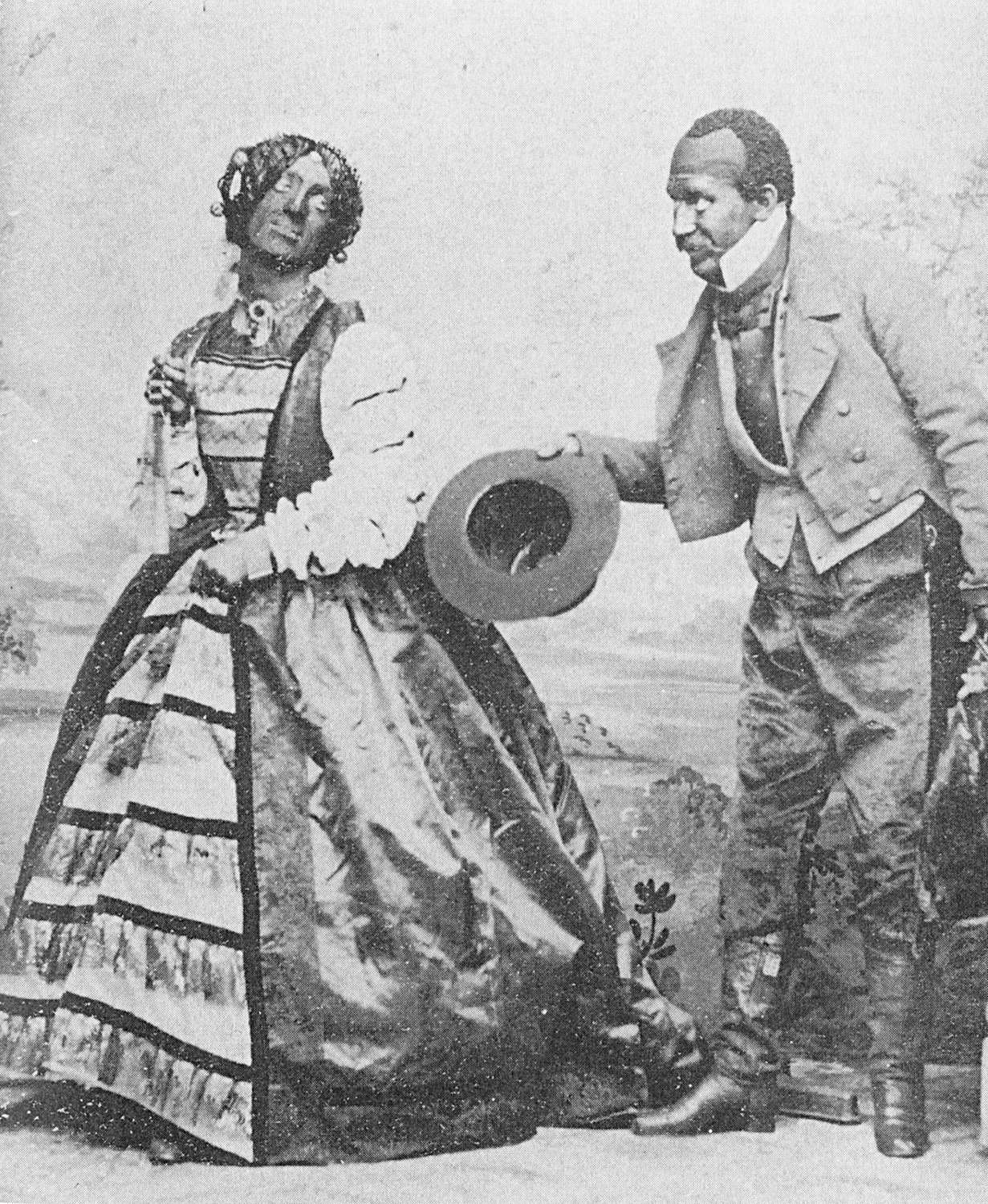
Rollin Howard (in wench costume) and George Griffin

Among songs that Howard performed, he was credited with "arranging" one of the first sheet music publications for Shoo Fly, Don't Bother Me in 1869. The song was extremely popular, and though the exact authorship is not clear, at times Howard has received some authorship credit.
