= The Switchback =

Former railway line in Scotland

The Switchback was a railway line in the East End of Glasgow, Scotland, constructed by the Caledonian Railway (CR). Connecting the lines at Rutherglen on the south side of the city with Robroyston on the north side, this route also served a number of industrial sidings and rail yards.

== History ==
=== South of London Road ===
Caledonian Railway (Dalmarnock Branch) Act 1858
- Act of Parliament
- Parliament of the United Kingdom
- Long title: An Act to enable the Caledonian Railway Company to make a Branch Railway to Dalmarnoch in the County oi Lanark; and for other Purposes.
- Citation: 21 & 22 Vict. c. xiii

Dates
- Royal assent: 21 May 1858

In 1858, the CR honed plans for the one-mile Rutherglen–Dalmarnock line, to be called the Dalmarnock branch. Primarily for the transport of coal, the terminus was the Dalmarnock Gas Works, Bridgeton, which had formerly been supplied via a canal from the river. No explicit commitment was made to introduce a passenger service.

The building of the seven-span Dalmarnock Railway Bridge during 1859–1861 across the River Clyde was integral to the branch opening in 1861. The terminus was initially known as Dalmarnock. Illustrating 1867 traffic volumes, consecutive returning coal trains heading southeast towards Hamilton Junction, after leaving the branch, caused an accident that sandwiched a passenger train between them. Catering for growing demand, a coal and goods depot existed at the terminus by 1869, which assumed the name of Bridgeton, the community to its northwest.

During the following years, coal remained the chief commodity carried. Although approved, the CR was tardy in completing an extension to London Road. A road bridge replaced the level crossing at Strathclyde Street (Strathclyde Junction), from where the new line skirted the western edge of the rail yard, while ascending to the stone abutments and arches of Dalmarnock Road–Baltic Street. Construction largely finished by the beginning of 1875, the line did not open to goods until April 1877.

The Rutherglen station was rebuilt further east to better facilitate the introduction of passenger traffic to the branch. Although a coal depot had existed at London Road for months, the passenger station, and the corresponding one at Bridgeton, did not open until April 1879. The wisdom of locating the terminus in a rural area at the extreme eastern boundary of Bridgeton, instead of closer to Glasgow, was questioned. The station stood to the west, and a goods yard, comprising four groups of sidings, opened to the east. The expanding Dalmarnock Iron Works (1873–1986) would be reached by reversing from the station onto sidings to the west. The Bridgeton station was on the north side of Dalmarnock Road, and to its west, a siding connected the gas works until closure in 1956.

According to an 1887 timetable, passenger trains ran London Road–Bridgeton–Rutherglen about every hour from 5:18 am until 10:00 pm on the six-minute journey. It is unclear if any ran as mixed trains. Some excursion trains, passing south of the Clyde, would include these two branch stations.

In 1891, the Strathclyde Street bridge was lengthened by the addition of two 27-foot (8.2 m) spans in preparation for the new underground line branching at Strathclyde Junction. The existing parallel viaduct was underpinned during excavations for the new line's descent. In 1895, when the low level Dalmarnock (Road) station opened on the new Rutherglen–Glasgow Green line that extended northwest of the station, the Rutherglen–London Road passenger service discontinued. The high level Bridgeton station, described for a few years in the early 1900s as a cleansing department station, may have been a location for cleaning passenger trains during off-peak periods. The Parkhead (later Parkhead Stadium) station (1897–1964), immediately north of London Road and east of Celtic Park stadium, was on a new east–west line opened the previous year. Both these routes operated as CR's Glasgow Central Railway. London Road became solely a goods and minerals (coal) depot.

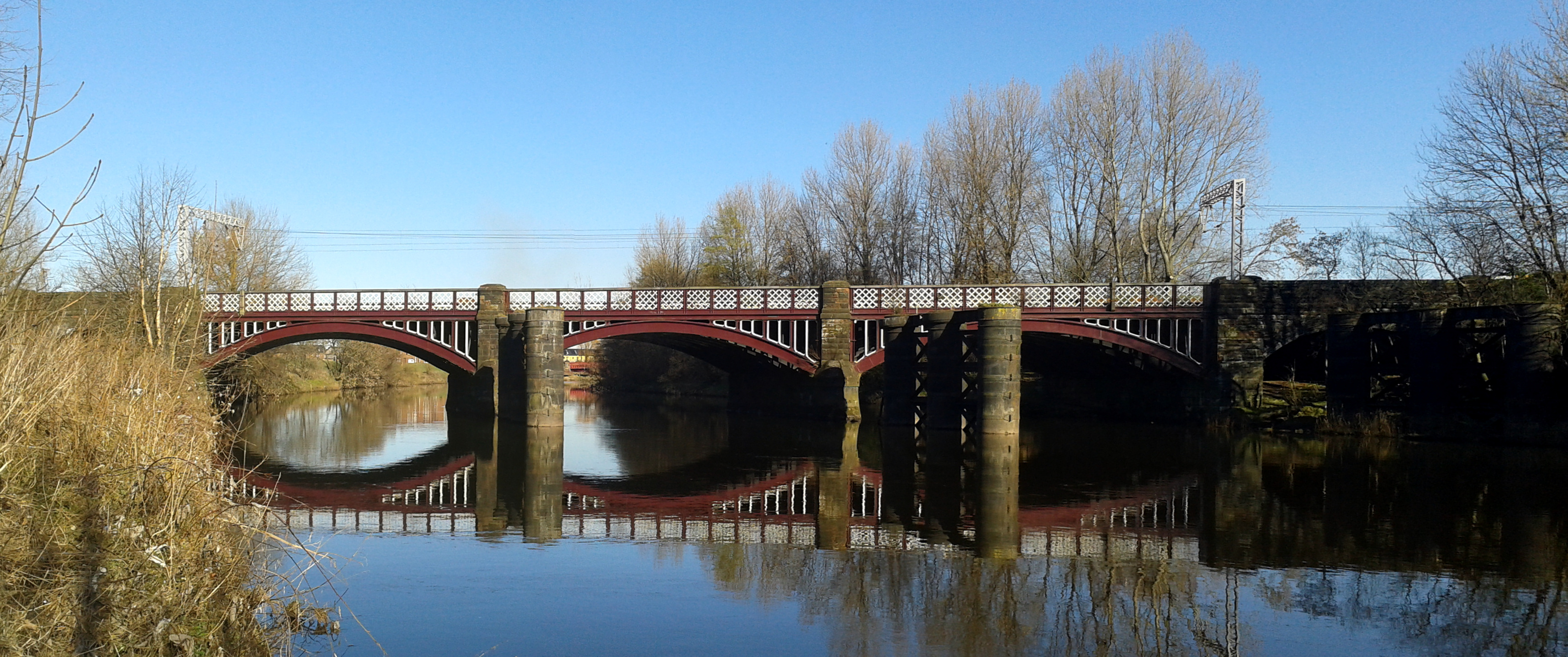
Piers of former Dalmarnock Railway Bridge (1861) in foreground, current bridge (1897) in background, Rutherglen, 2016.

The replacement Dalmarnock Railway Bridge was built during 1893–1897 to carry twin tracks, and was widened in 1923 to carry an additional track. The former bridge continued to provide additional capacity until no longer required.

The Dalmarnock sewage works sidings (c.1902–1960s) facilitated the transportation of grit, sand and other heavy solids. The Dalmarnock power station sidings (1920–1977) handled coal trains. When the plant converted to oil firing, two loaded trains of petrochemicals came each weekday.

The Bridgeton depot closed in 1965, and the London Road rail yard in 1986. Since 1979, the Argyle Line has included the Rutherglen–Dalmarnock route. All other tracks north of Strathclyde Junction have been lifted.

=== North of London Road ===
In 1846, the CR leased the Garnkirk and Glasgow Railway's Coatbridge–Townhead line, with a formal merger in 1865. In 1849, the route was extended to a western terminus at Glasgow's Buchanan Street railway station. In 1881, approval was granted to connect this line with the London Road branch. The objectives were to access the Glasgow Cattle Market via the Coatbridge Branch (NBR), better serve the Parkhead area, and connect the CR's northern and southern systems in Glasgow. Although indicated to include passenger travel to Buchanan Street, if such a service existed, it was short lived.

From Germiston Junction High on this line, the route proceeded 0.4 miles (0.6 km) south to Blochairn Junction. Here at the Blackhill locks, a one-half mile (0.8 km) branch southwest opened in 1884 along the north bank of the Monkland Canal to the Blochairn Iron Works. Constructed by the Steel Company of Scotland about this time, the plant closed in 1958 or 1962. Proceeding 1.9 miles (3 km) south of Blochairn Junction, the project would involve excavating 300,000 cubic yards (230,000 m^{3}) of earth, and a long viaduct stretching over the City Union Line (NBR) at Carntyne Road, Duke Street, the Coatsbridge line, and Great Eastern Road. Bridging London Road, the line passed around the east of the goods yard, to connect at London Road Junction. Opened in 1886, the whole route was double track.

At 350 yards (320 m) north of London Road, the Parkhead Forge, a.k.a. the Parkhead Iron Works, and the largest steelworks in Scotland, operated extensive sidings. Served initially only by the NBR Coatbridge line, the new CR line, designated part of the London Road branch, later included a connection.

Germiston Junction Low (west of High) (1886–1962) was connected to the line at Blackhill Junction to its southeast. The Kennyhill goods yard (1887–1964), that existed 1.2 miles (2 km) south of Germiston Junction, had a depot from 1895. Germiston Junction–Balornock Junction extended north in 1894 to connect with the Hamiltonhill Branch being opened the same year.

Balornock Junction–London Road Junction closed in 1964, as a result of the Beeching cuts. It is unclear when The Switchback name first appeared and whether it applied to the whole route that connected the CR's northern and southern systems in Glasgow.

=== Accidents ===
1895: A shunter brakeman, who stepped onto the main line near Strathclyde Street, was cut in two by a passing train.

1901: A steam engine stopped shunting at the Parkhead Ironworks to refill with water at London Road. On returning at high speed, it crashed into the stationary wagons, derailing and wrecking the first three. Although the fireman was initially rendered unconscious, both he and the engineer suffered only minor injuries.

1902: When a brakeman stumbled beneath a shunting engine at the Dalmarnock Gas Works, he did not survive the amputation of both legs.

1903: When a passenger leaned on a compartment door, while crossing the Clyde, the door swung open, and she fell out. A search party found her on the Rutherglen side, but she died of her injuries that evening. A few months later, when attempting to board a moving engine at the Dalmarnock Gas Works, an employee slipped and was fatally crushed between a railway wagon and wall.

1914: When shunter fell on the line at the Blochairn Steelworks, a wagon wheel fatally crushed his head.

1938: A rolling wagon at the Blochairn Steelworks fatally knocked down a shunter.

=== Connections to other lines ===
- Garnkirk and Glasgow Railway at Balornock Junction
- Hamiltonhill Branch at Balornock Junction
- Glasgow Central Railway at Strathclyde Junction

=== Redevelopments ===
The M80 motorway obliterated the Germiston Junction–Blochairn Junction track bed. The Glasgow Wholesale Market and other commercial premises occupy the former Blochairn Iron Works site. The Monkland Canal was infilled prior to constructing the M8 around 1980.

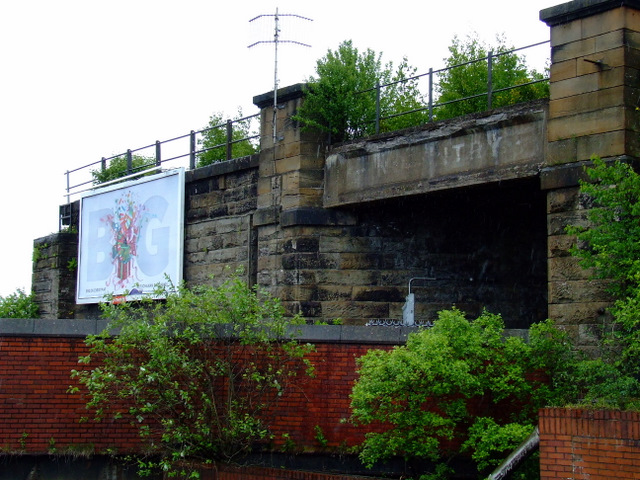
Abutments of demolished bridge over Dalmarnock Road at Dalmarnock station, 2011, prior to being removed entirely in the station's redevelopment

Road bridges over the railway cutting exist at Gadie Street (c.1902), Cumbernauld Road (c.1895), and Edinburgh Road (c.1928).

At the Carntyne Road/Todd Street intersection, only the western part of the substantial NBR stone abutments stands after 2016 demolition work. Only sections of low wall remain of the CR bridges immediately to the east on Carntyne and south at Duke Street.

The Forge Shopping Centre occupies the former Parkhead Forge site.

Nothing remains of the railway viaduct at Gallowgate (Great Eastern Road) and today's A728 intersection, nor London Road at Davaar Street. The brownfield London Road station and rail yards became the Commonwealth Arena and Sir Chris Hoy Velodrome, and the corresponding section of the Glasgow East End Regeneration Route (EERR).

The arch and bridge viaduct near the now A728/A749 intersection was demolished in 2009. The former rail yards and properties immediately to the northwest and northeast are brownfields. As of 2019, a mixture of one and two-bedroom flats and two and three-bedroom terraced housing were planned for the northwest location, and the northeast one was for sale.
