= Switchback (band) =

Switchback is an American music duo consisting of Brian FitzGerald and Martin McCormack. They play a mix of bluegrass, Americana, and traditional Celtic music.

== History ==
In 1986, FitzGerald was a mandolin student of Jethro Burns and had been touring with Clifton Chenier when he met McCormack. McCormack was an award-winning voice student of Whelma Oshiem at the American Conservatory of Chicago, and a member of the Star Search-selected band Beyond Blue. They were chosen by County Kerry composer and concertina master Terrence 'Cuz' Teahan to join his traditional Irish group. They were taught the old country techniques of Irish musical entertainment.

In 1988, after Teahan's death, the duo continued his musical legacy by joining forces with banjo player Bert McMahon of Woodford, and County Galway and Chicago fiddle legend Mary McDonagh to form a group, the Wailin' Banshees. Their first album was a commercial success, and Chevrolet used one of the songs from it to promote the Chevy Blazer automobile. Producer Lloyd Maines produced several albums for them, including "The Fire That Burns", "Bolinree" and "Kanoka".

FitzGerald and McCormack did not forget their Irish roots and continued to perform at concerts and festivals. Playing over 200 engagements a year, they performed at festivals from Stan Rogers Folk Festival in Nova Scotia to the Summer Celebration in Michigan, where they performed for an audience of 15,000. Switchback has shared the stage with such notable Celtic musicians as Cherish the Ladies, Gaelic Storm, Liz Carroll, and John Williams. They tour Ireland each year, and have played at the pub in Westport, County Mayo, owned by The Chieftains' Matt Malloy.

Switchback's music is frequently played on radio stations such as RTÉ Radio One with Pat Kenny in Dublin, Ireland, and can be seen on Public Broadcasting Television Stations throughout the United States.

== Recognition, memberships, and awards ==
- Irish Music Association: Top Duo in a Pub, Festival or Concert (US, IRE, EU, UK) 2008
- Illinois Arts Council Arts Tour Roster
- Illinois Arts Council Artist in Education
- Iowa Arts Council Performing Artist roster
- North American Folk Alliance Member
- Americana Music Association Member
- ASCAP-Plus Awards Recipient 2005–present

== Instrumentation ==
- Brian FitzGerald: guitar, mandolin, vocals
- Martin McCormack: bass, guitar, vocals

Co-musicians:

- Nick Hirka: drums, banjo, bodhran, ukulele
- Keith Riker: percussion, bodhran, native American flute, harmonica
- Takeshi Horiuchi: bodhran, percussion
- Lily Hughes, drums
- Jim Hines, drums
- Paul Von Mertens, saxophone, flute
- Andon Davis, guitar
- John Rice, dobro, mandolin, guitar, violin

== Collaborations ==
The following are some of the notable acts Switchback has performed with:

- Bryan Bowers
- Dale Watson
- Kansas
- Leon Russell
- Lloyd Maines
- The Moody Blues
- John Hartford

== Discography ==
- Ain't Going Back - 1994
- Check on Out - 1995
- Seven Rowdy Irish Tunes (and Two Sad Ones!) - 1996
- Good Church - 1997
- Dar's Place - 1998
- Nancy Whiskey - 2001
- The Fire That Burns - 2002
- 10th Anniversary Collection - 2003
- Bolinree - 2005
- Falling Water River - 2006
- Ghosts of the River Folk - 2010
- Kanoka - 2013
- The Hibernian Mass - 2015
- The Marian Mountain Mass - 2017
- Red or Blue -2025

== DVDs ==
- Celtic Sessions Vol. 1 and 2 (made from the PBS special of the same name)
- Americana Sessions Vo1. 1 and 2 (made from the PBS special of the same name)
- Turf Fire
