= Arched harp =

Class of musical instruments

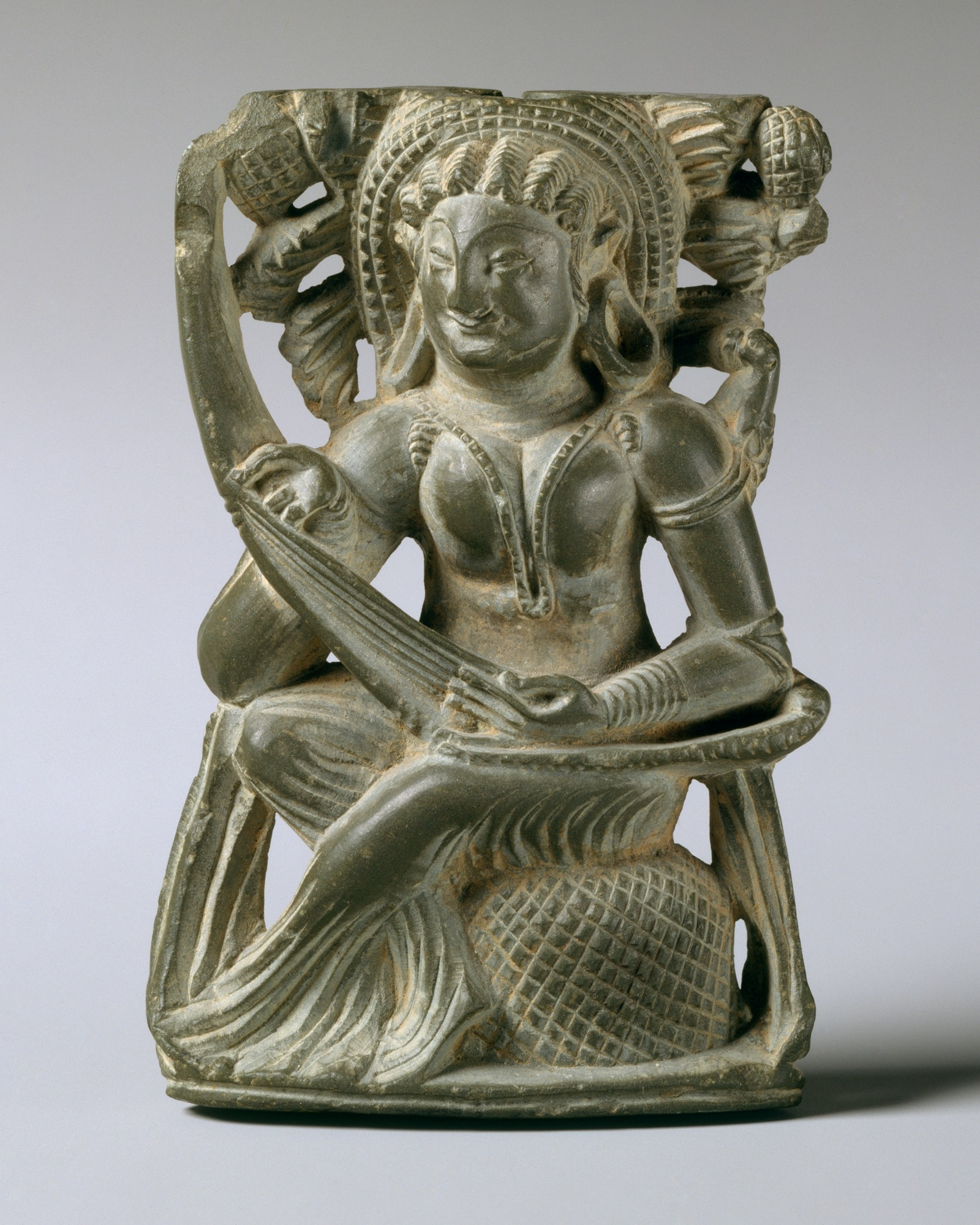
- Before becoming stick zithers Indian veenas were arched harps. Sculpture of a woman playing the veena 6th–7th century, India (Jammu and Kashmir, ancient kingdom of Kashmir)

String instrument
- Other names: bow harp; India: chitra vīṇā, vipanchi vīṇā, mattakokila vīṇā, bīn/vina; Egypt: bīnꞏt, b.nt, bent, benet, Coptic voina
- Classification: plucked string instrument
- Hornbostel–Sachs classification: 322: 322.1 Open harps – The harp has no pillar.; 322.11 Arched harps. (Harps, the plane of the strings lies perpendicular to the resonator's surface)
- Developed: Arose from the musical bow during the Bronze Age; earliest harps seen in artwork in Canaan (angular harp), Mesopotamia, Iran and India (all arched harps).

Related instruments
- African harp; Ancient Greek harps; Ancient veena; Bin baja; Kafir harp; Pin; Saung; Yazh

Arched harps is a category in the Hornbostel-Sachs classification system for musical instruments, a type of harp. The instrument may also be called bow harp. With arched harps, the neck forms a continuous arc with the body and has an open gap between the two ends of the arc (open harps).

Arched harps are probably the most ancient form of the harp, evolving from the musical bow. The first bowed harps appeared around 3000 B.C. in Iran and Mesopotamia and then in Egypt. India may have had the instrument as early as Mesopotamia.

The horizontal arched-bow from Sumeria spread west to ancient Greece, Rome and Minoan Crete and eastward to India. Like Egypt, however, India continued to develop the instrument on its own; undated artwork in caves shows a harp resembling a musical bow, with improvised resonators of different shapes and different numbers of added strings.

When the angular harp replaced the arched harp about 2000 B.C. in the Middle East and spread along the Silk Road, the arched harp was retained in India until after 800 A.D. (a form of ancient vina), and in Egypt until the Hellenistic Age (after 500 B.C). It can still be found today in Sub-Saharan Africa.

From India the arched harp was introduced into Malaysia, as well as Champa and Burma (as early as 500 A.D.) where it is still played under the name of saung, and in 7th-century A.D. Cambodia as the pin

Buddhists were involved with the spread of the arched harp in Asia. Artwork depicting the arched harp that survived in China, Malaysia, Indonesia, Burma, and Cambodia comes from Buddhist communities. The harp disappeared in India about the time when Hinduism displaced Buddhism. The Buddhists took the harp north from India along the silk road to China, where it was painted in the Mogao Caves and Yulin Grottos. Additionally, Buddhist Burma sent two types of harp to Chinese court to perform, including the phoenix-headed harp. The latter became known in China as the Phoenix-headed konghou.

Portable bowed harps may have made their way from Egypt up the Nile to East Africa and, branching off from this route, also to Central and West Africa.

Alternative, the arched harp may have entered Sub-Saharan Africa from Indonesia, during trade in the Middle Ages.

== Description ==
=== Classification ===
Open vs closed harps

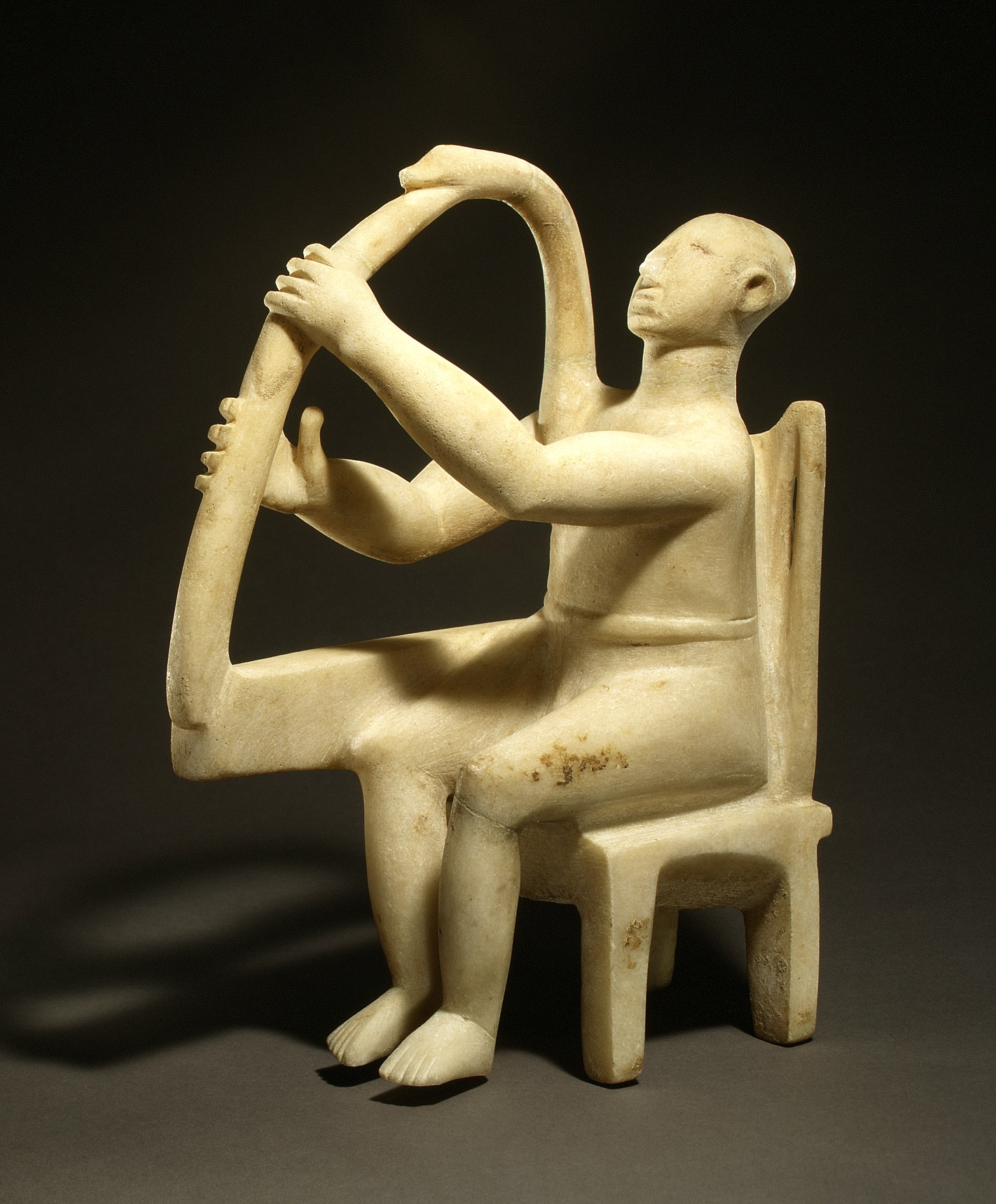
Cycladic culture harp player, 2800–2700 B.C

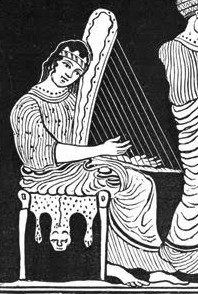
Open angular-harp.

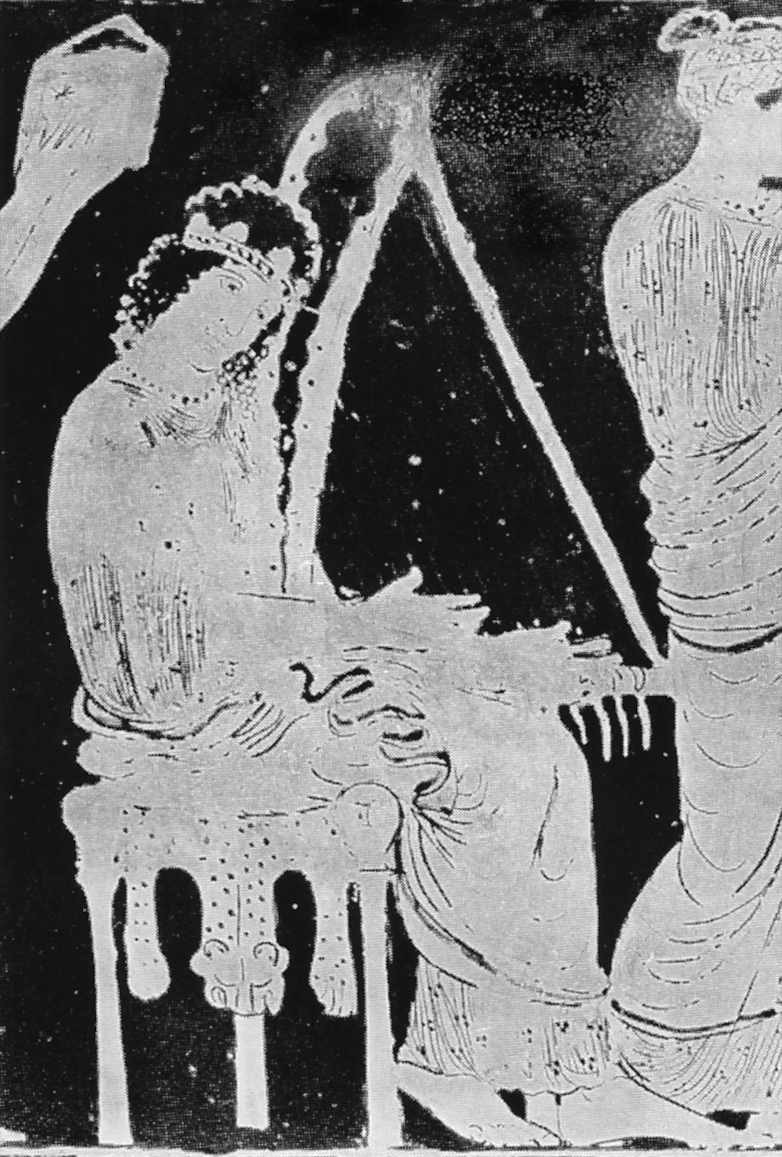
Frame harp, the opening is closed.

Although these are angular harps, the idea is the same. Closing the opening with a column support makes an "open" harp into a frame harp. However at least one expert researcher looked at the Cycladic frame harps and felt that, even though the arched harp's opening was closed, it was still an arched harp.

The harp is a composite chordophone. It has string-carrying neck permanently attached to a resonator body that receives the vibrations of the strings and emits them as sound. Its strings are stretched between the neck and the body. What distinguishes it from lutes is that the plane of its strings is not parallel to the sound-emitting surface of the instrument's body, but perpendicular to it. The body and neck form an arch in arched harps, or two sides of a triangle in angular harps. If the triangle is completed, with a third side joining the body and neck, it is a frame harp. Harps without the third side are open harps.

=== Structure ===
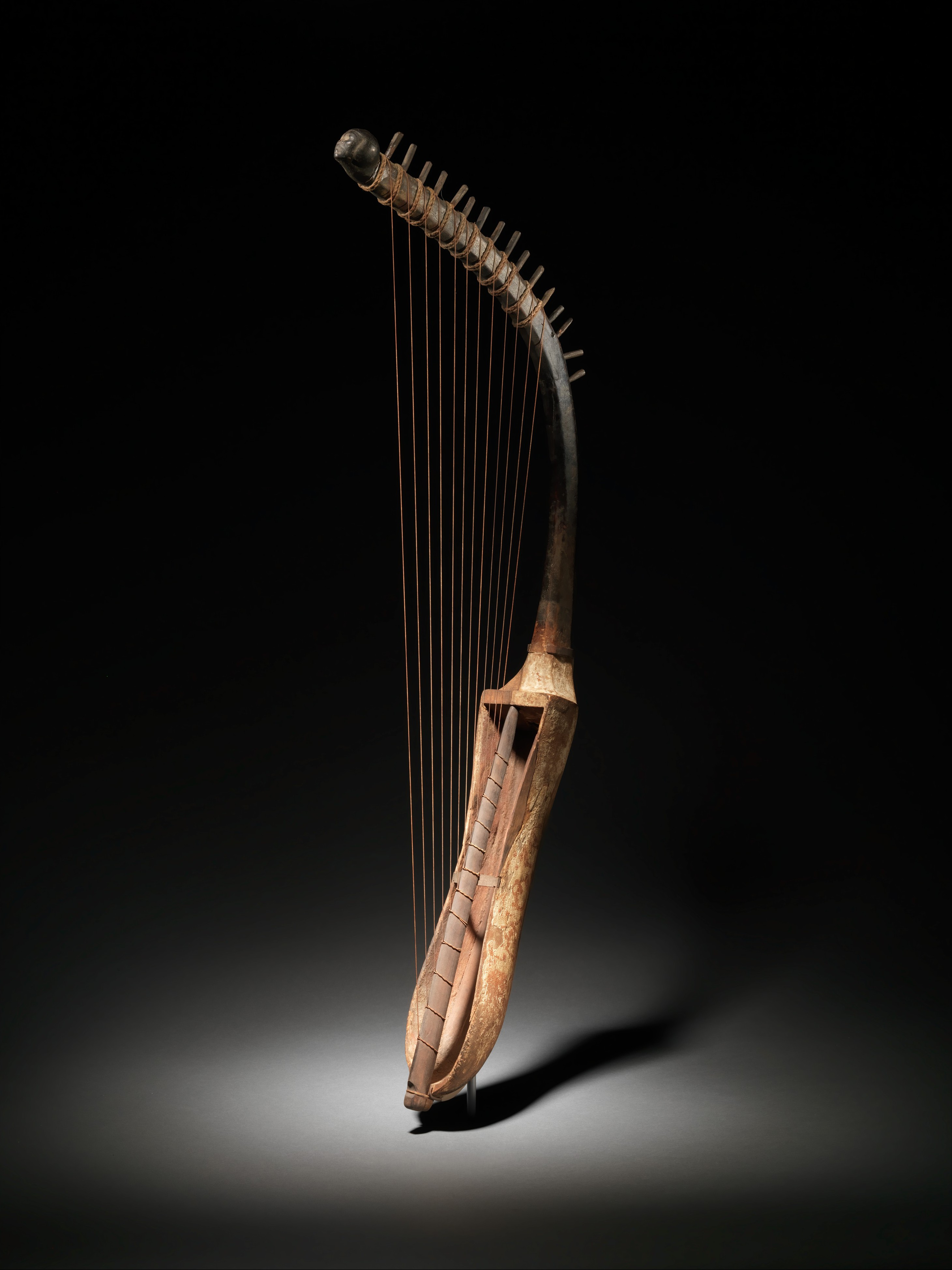
Boat-shaped body

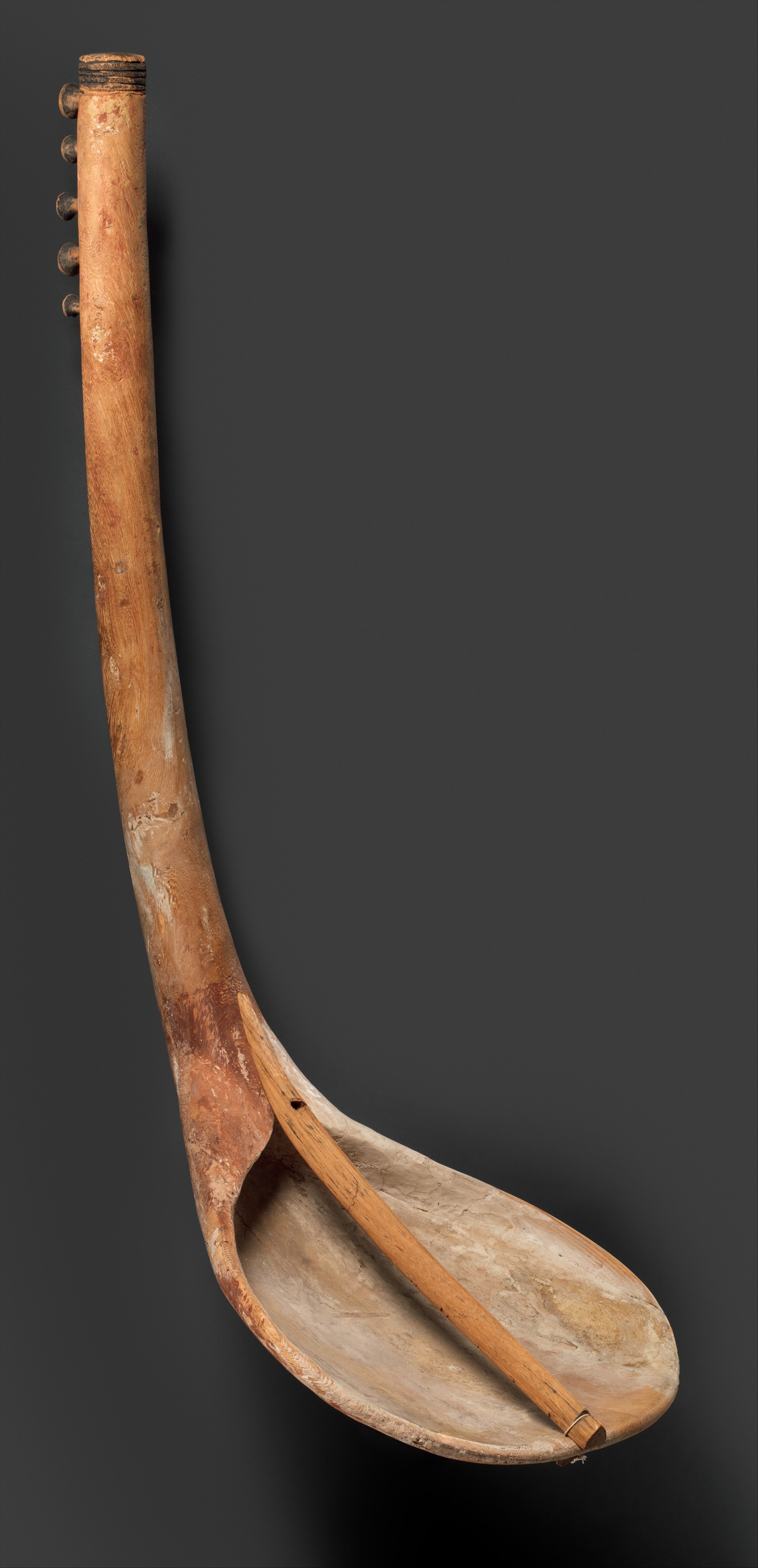
Ladle-shaped body

Bow harps without the skin soundboard, showing the neck and wooden-bowl body with string-holding rod.

The body of the bowed harp is resonator. Its shape is varied, and it can have the shape of a spade, spoon or ladle, boat or box, among others. A leather soundboard is stretched on its open surface facing the direction of the strings, and a string-holding rod usually runs along its center line, to which the strings are tied. Their other end is connected to the neck via a tuning device - which can be a special loop, rotating leather ring or tuning peg. The defining characteristic of the bowed harp is that its neck starts more or less in the direction of the longitudinal axis of the body, and then curves.

Bow harps have relatively few strings, usually fewer than 10, compared to angular harps, which usually have 15 to 25 strings. Historically, strings were made of sinew (animal tendons). Other materials have included gut (animal intestines), plant fiber, braided hemp, cotton cord, silk, nylon, and wire.

=== Variations ===
Vertical and horizontal arched harps

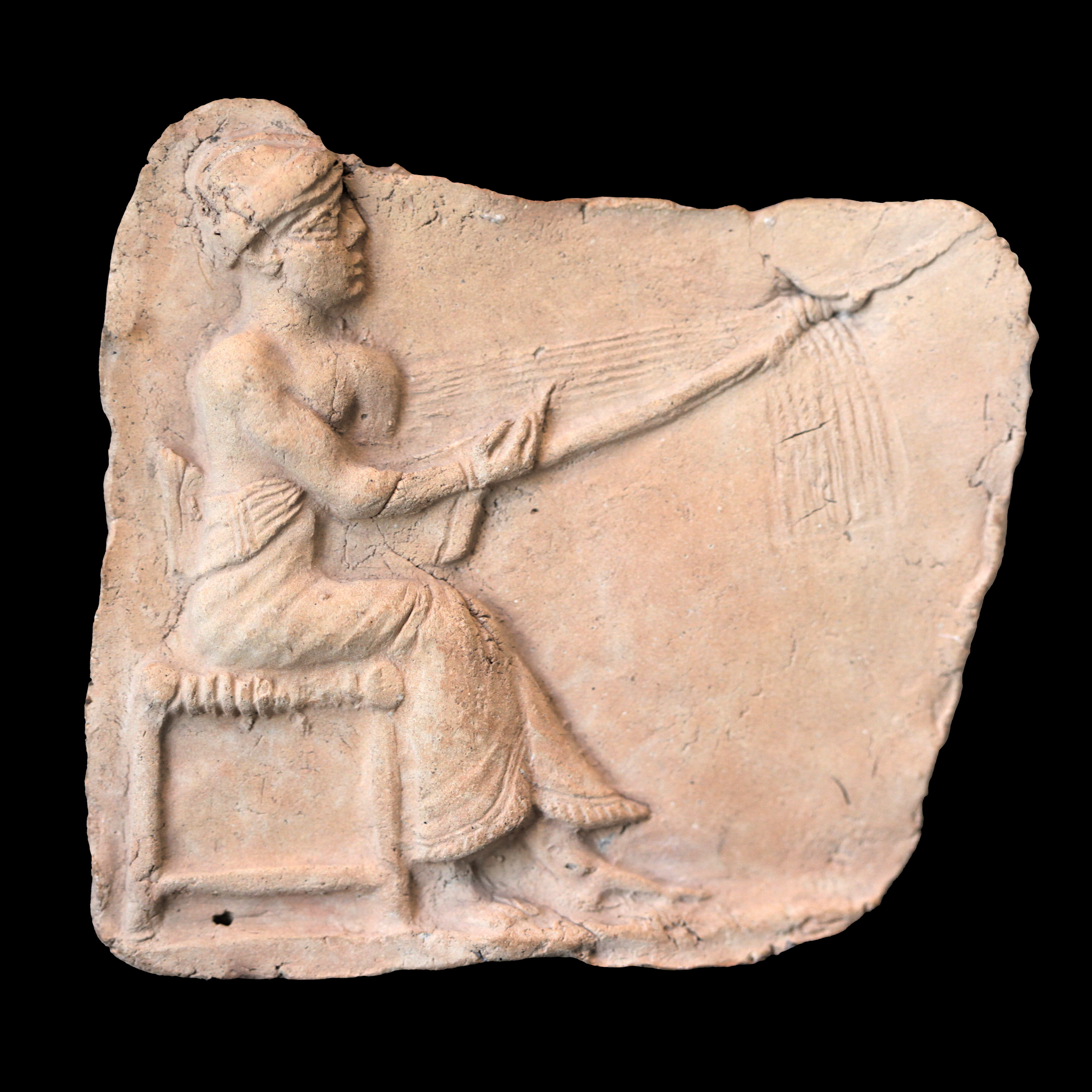
Tell Asmar or Eshnunna, Iraq. Harpist with horizontal arched harp. Moulded terracotta relief, 1900-1500 B.C.

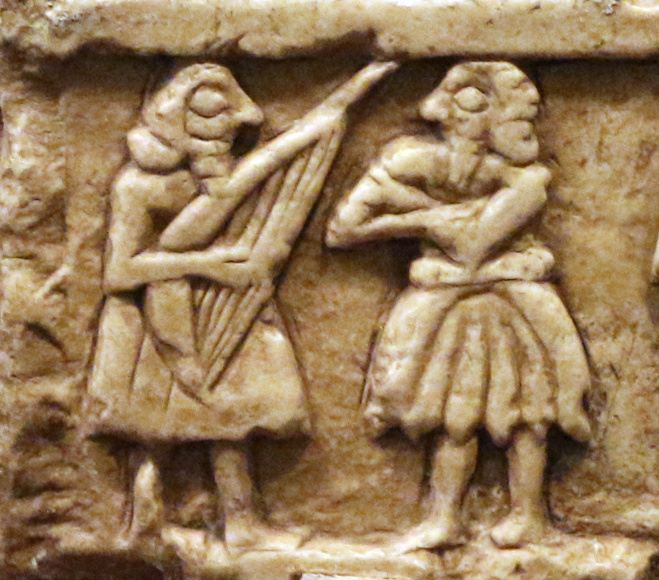
Bow harp, Harp, Khafajah, Iraq Stone Tablet, circa 3000-2334 BC. Alternate info: Khafajah banquet scene, c. 2650-2550 BC.

Bowed harps are diverse in both size and shape, from instruments small enough for a child to hold in their arms to harps made from logs, left lying flat on the ground.

Similar to the angular harps, a vertical and horizontal variant can be distinguished here. The strings of the vertical bowed harp are more or less vertical, and most of the time the resonating body of the instrument is below the neck. The high notes are closer to the musician, the low notes are further away, just like in the case of today's Western harp. The body of the horizontal bowed harp is in a horizontal position, and the neck typically grows out of the end of the instrument body farthest from the musician.

== History ==
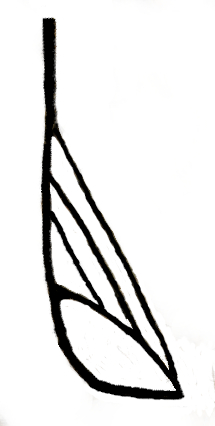
Harp pictogram, Uruk, period IV (ca. 3350-3200 BC)

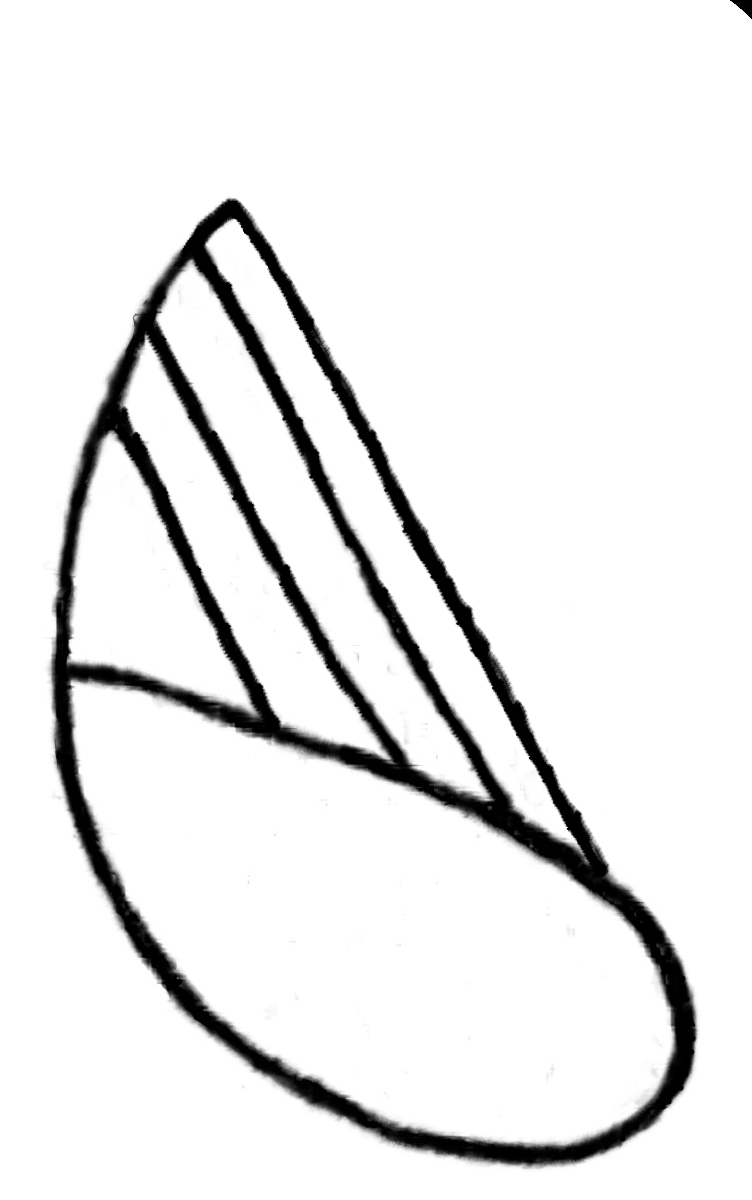
Harp pictogram, Uruk, period IV (ca. 3350-3200 BC).

The musical bow has been identified by some researchers as "the earliest chordophone". The earliest image of a musical bow from circa 15,000 B.C. was found in the Cave of the Trois-Frères. Musical bows need resonators, and a calabash gourd is used for that purpose. The musical bow "probably" became the bow harp when its disconnected resonator and the bow were integrated, the bow becoming the instrument's neck, and more strings were added.

A very early depiction of a bow-shaped harp with three strings survives on a clay tablet from the Uruk period at the end of the 4th millennium. The image is a pictograph, an early form of writing, showing a three-stringed bow harp. The earliest harps appeared in Mesopotamia (vertical) and Iran (horizontal), circa 3300–3000, and researchers haven't determined if one is earlier than the other.

By 3000 B.C., bow harps were common in the Middle East. They were commonly depicted in Egypt by 2500 B.C. Harps depicted were always arched until about 2000 B.C. After that, harps were increasingly angular, until the arched harp disappeared from Mesopotamia and Iran. Frame harps used in Europe were invented about 1000 C.E. Separately, the Greeks had a frame harp, called spindle harp, shown well developed about 430 B.C. India also had early bow harps, similar to musical bows, visible in cave art which has not been precisely dated.

=== Earliest harp image ===
In excavations of Megiddo in the former land of Canaan, a harp image was found engraved on a paving stone dating from between 3300 and 3100 B.C. The image shows an apparent framed harp, probably in the hands of a woman, which was found in a group of 20 carvings on floor stones.

According to Joachim Braun, this image of a stringed instrument predates the previously known images of Cycladic frame harps by 1000 years and is said to represent the oldest known forerunner of the Chang and angular harp in the Caucasus. Braun draws a typological connection to the tor-sapl-yukh angular harp played by the West Siberian Khanty and Mansi people up to the beginning of the 20th century, the free ends of which are connected by a strut. However, such an interpretation is not universally accepted; other authors want to be cautious in recognizing a harp or a lyre.

=== Another early image ===
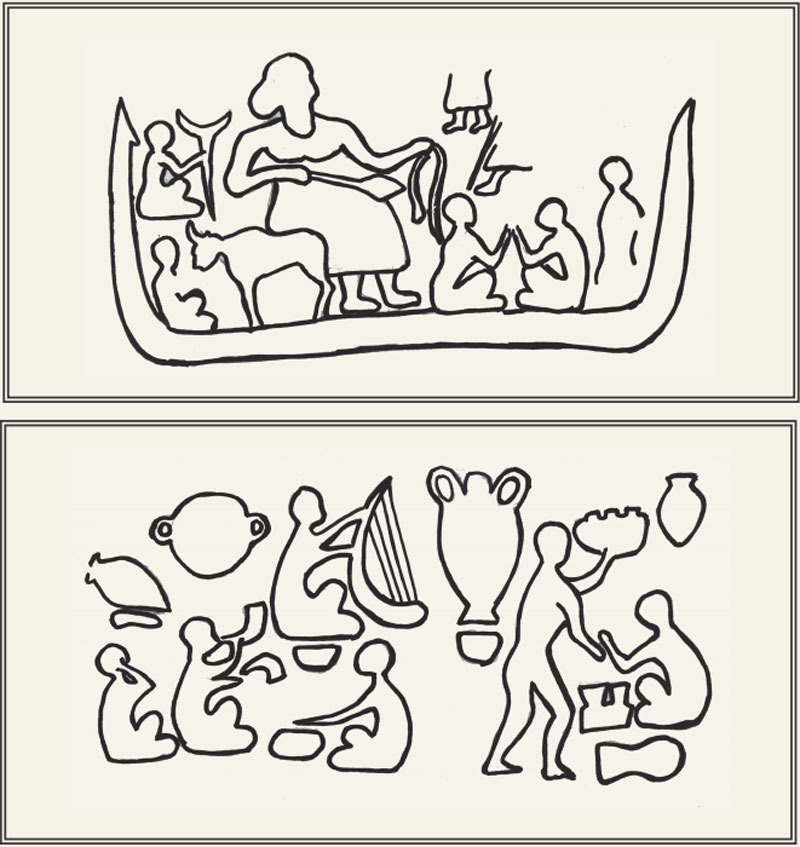
Impression of a cylinder seal from Čoḡā Miš, Iran, 3300-3100 B.C. Lower figure: drawing of five fragments made of unfired clay. Height of the harp player in the music scene about 1.5 centimeters. University of Chicago Oriental Institute

An early image of a bow harp can be seen on a cylinder seal from Iran that dates from 3300 to 3100 B.C., found in Chogha Mish (western Iranian province of Khuzestan).

It was found during excavations from 1961 to 1978 by the Oriental Institute, University of Chicago. Though broken, small fragments were put together to form an orchestra image which includes the harp. It is, perhaps, the oldest known image of an orchestra or ensemble.

In the image, a presumably female protagonist sits on the right-hand side. Facing her is a servant holding a milk jug for her, while opposite four musicians are also seated. A musician is playing a four-string bowed harp, and the figure below is beating a drum standing on the floor in front of it. Further to the left a musician is blowing a horn, and behind him the singer is holding a hand behind his cheek, as oriental singers still do today, such a Kurdish Dengbêjdo. The large jug with a handle in the middle and the scene on the right make it clear that the band is performing at a religious festival. Other illustrations of horizontal bowed harps come from Shar-i Sokhta (3000-2300 B.C.) in eastern and southeastern Iran.

== Distribution ==
=== Mesopotamia ===
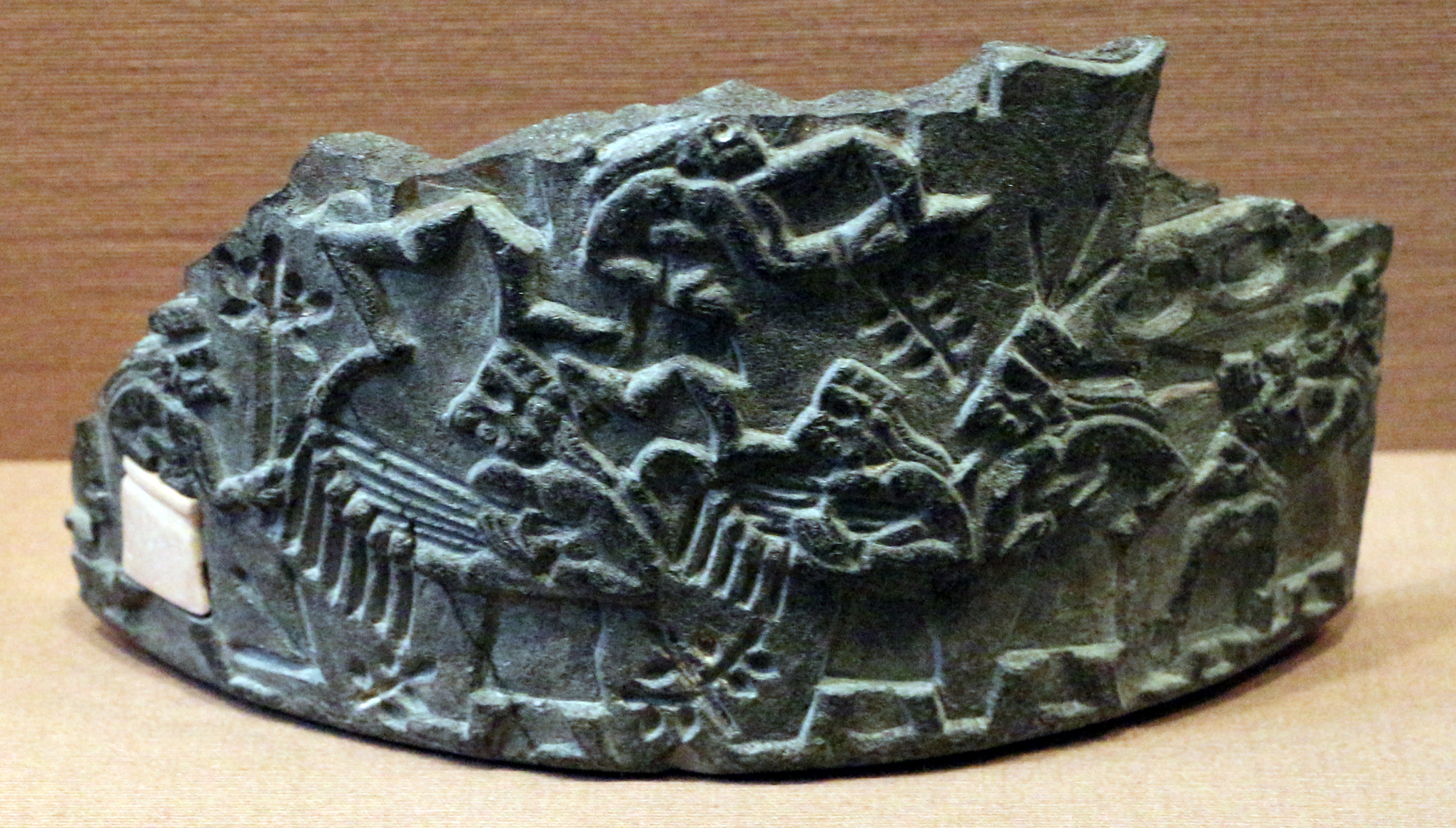
Steatite vase from Bismaya, Iraq, 2700-2500 BC. Musicians' procession with horizontal arched harps. University of Chicago Oriental Institute.

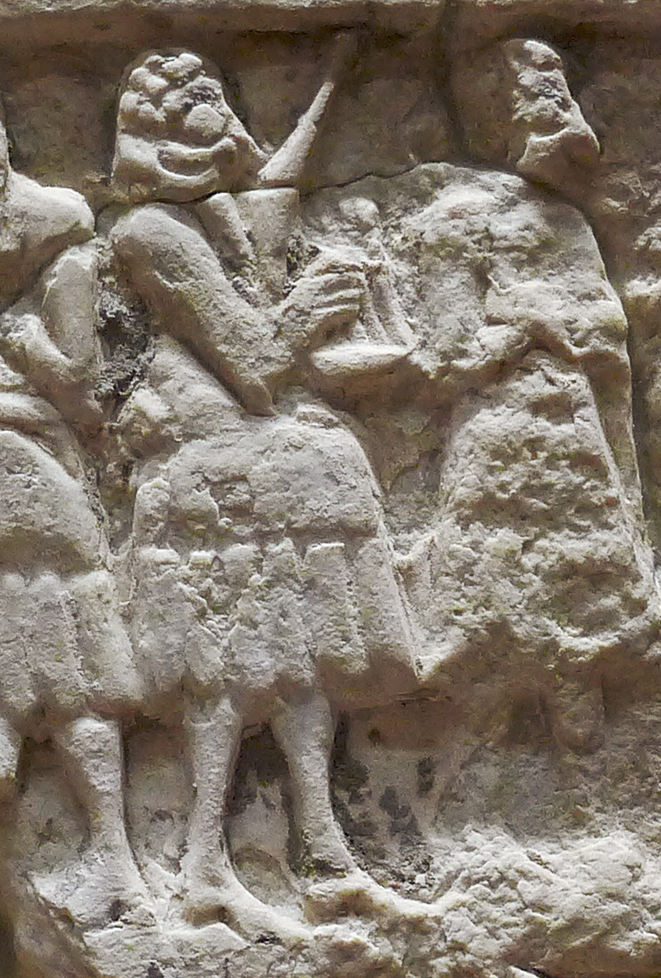
Kiš, Iraq, 3000 to 2334 BC. Detail of banquet showing arched harp. Louvre.

The harp was zà-mí in the Sumerian language. The Akkadian word for harp was sammû, possibly a loanword from Sumerian.

Among the Sumerian pictographs from around 3000 B.C. is one in Uruk that resembles a vertical bowed harp. In this period similar representations also occur on stone tablets and seal impressions. A horizontal bowed harp can also be recognized on a Bismaya steatite vase fragment from the second half of the 3rd millennium B.C.

The remains of two 13-stringed harps were found in the royal cemetery of the city of Ur from around 2500 B.C. One harp was reconstructed and is now in the British Museum. All the wooden parts of the instruments were destroyed, but they could be easily reconstructed based on sketches from excavation, the gold and silver decoration embedded in bitumen that partially covered them, and images on seals.

In Mesopotamia, the bowed harp was used until around 1900 B.C., when it was replaced by the angular harp.

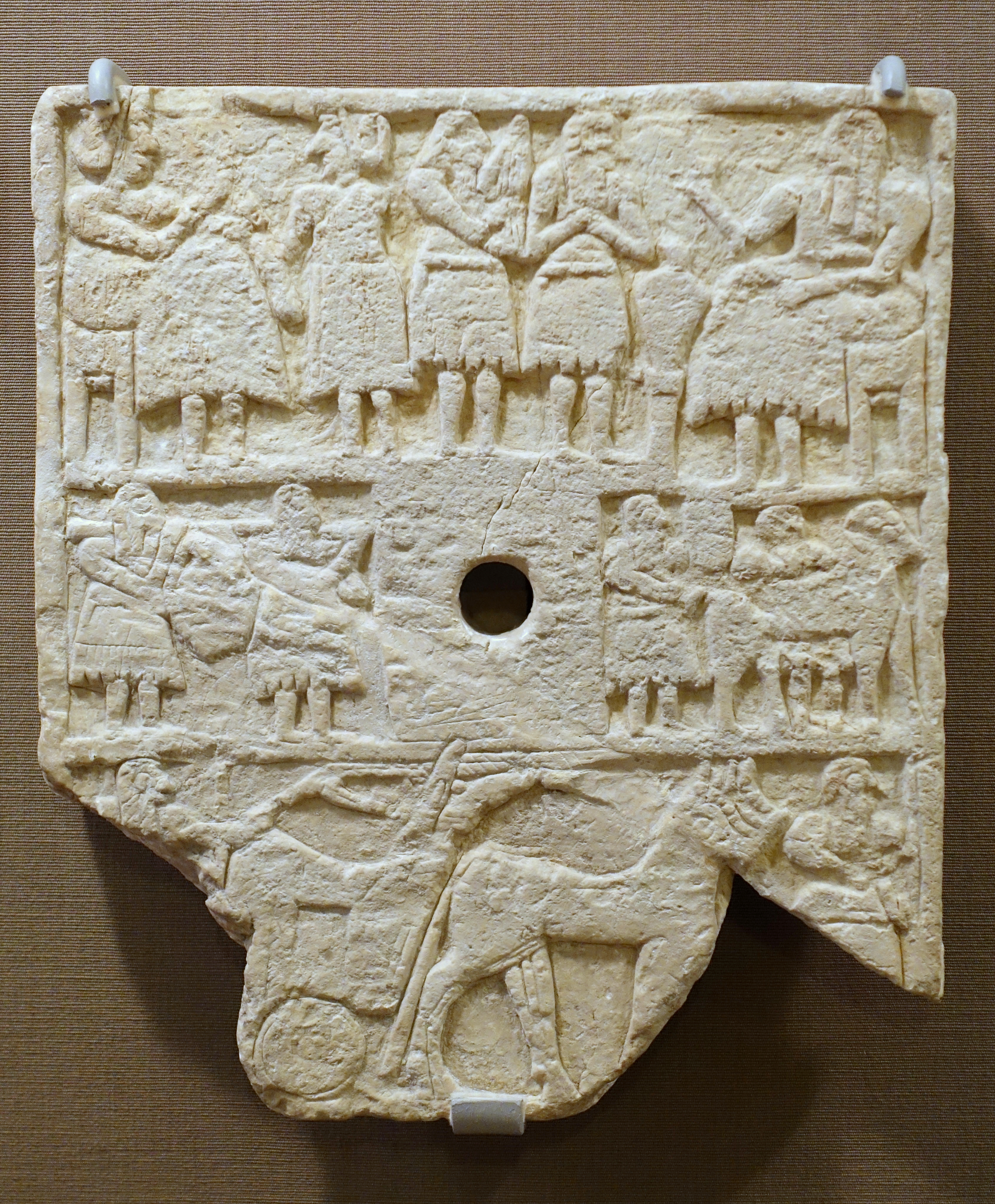
Tell Agrab, Iraq, 3000 to 2334 B.C. University of Chicago, Oriental Institute.

=== India, Indochina ===
Indian arched harps

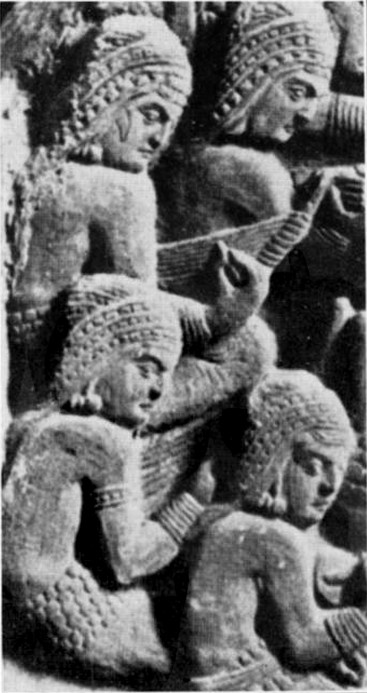
Relief sculpture, Indian vina harps, Bharhut, 175 B.C. Northern India, eastern side. Players are using small fingersized plectrums.

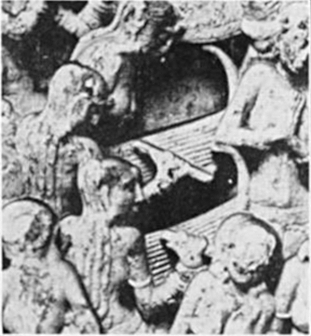
Relief of harpers playing horizontal veenas, using plectrums. Amaravati, ca. 200 A.D. British Museum.

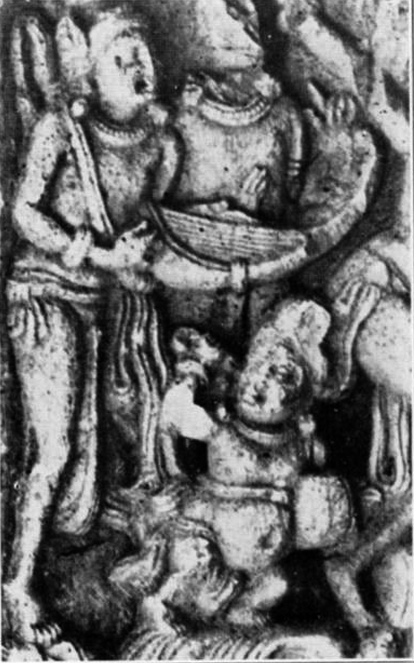
Relief of harper playing vina, Amaravati ca. 200 A.D. East coast of India. British Museum.

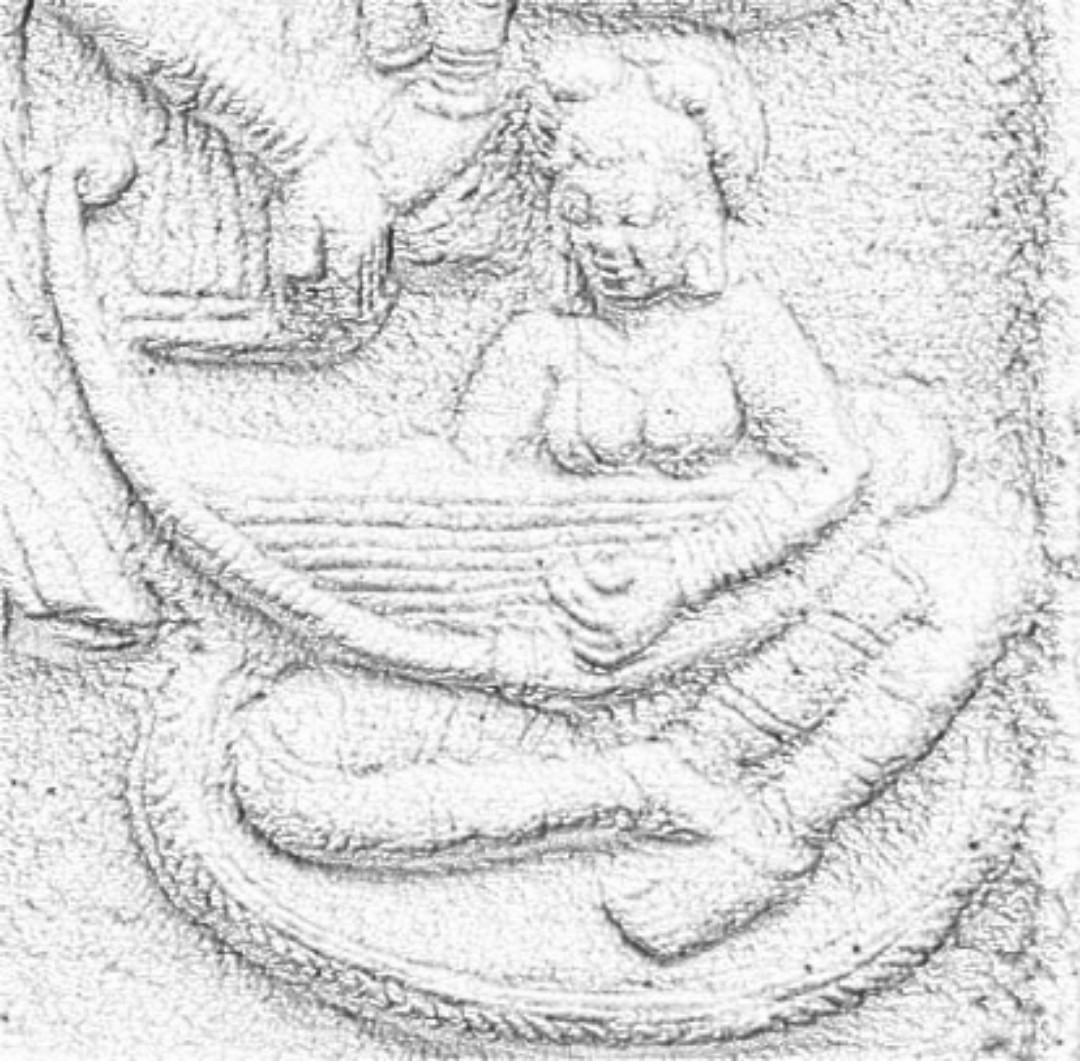
Sketch of sculpture of veena-lute, part of a door lintel found in northern India at Pawaya, Gupta period, 4th-5th century AD

In India today, the term veena (vina, bin) includes a large variety of stringed instruments. In ancient Indian times, vina was used to name bowed harps and lutes and later to stick zithers. Names of arched harps included the fingerplucked chitra vīṇā with seven strings, the vipanchi vīṇā with nine strings (plucked with a plectrum) and the mattakokila vīṇā (a harp or possibly board zither) with 21 strings. Today, the mainstream instruments using the name veena include the Rudra veena stick zither and Saraswati veena lute.

In India, the vina harp had a history (as documented in sculpture) from circa 175 B.C. in the sculpture of Bharhut to artwork in circa 800 A.D. In looking for origins, ethnomusicologist Curt Sachs noted that the instrument in artwork in Mesopotamia and India was very close. He wrote that the horizontal harp seen in the Mesopotamian Bismaya art has the same "shape, position and manner of playing" as the Bharhut harp. Sachs felt that the link to the Bismaya harp was direct, that it could not be related to the Egyptian harp. His reasons included that both the Indian and Iraq harps were played horizontally with plectrums, and Egyptian were not. In spite of this, Sachs also wrote that the Egyptian bīnꞏt and Indian bīn (a north Indian variant of vīna) were the same word.

When Mesopotamia and Iran abandoned the use of the arched harp for the angular harp towards about 1900 B.C., Egypt and India continued to use the instrument. The development of the angular harp did not occur in India, nor did the chang angular harp type, widespread in the Middle Ages in the Orient, have an Indian counterpart at any time. The arched harp lasted in art in India until circa 800 A.D., and later in connected communities in Southeast Asia.

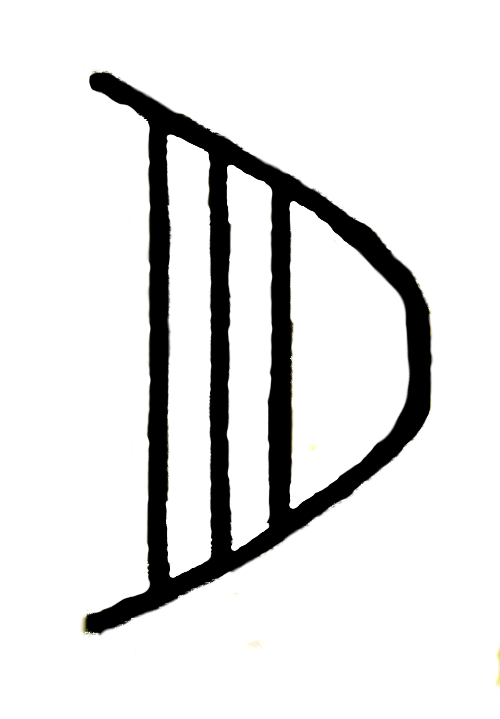
Indus script harp pictogram

Among the writings of the Indus Valley Civilization (3000–1800 BC) there were pictograms resembling a harp, but after the Indus script stopped being used, there wasn't a depiction of a harp up to the 2nd century B.C. Upon the re-appearance of Indian pictorial art, bowed harps were immediately visible, so it is possible that the type of instrument was in continuous use until then. The instruments mentioned as vina or vipanci in the Natya Shastra, the oldest Indian collection of texts on music written in Sanskrit circa 200 B.C.E. — 200 C.E., were probably multi-stringed bowed harps. In Old Tamil literature, the term yazh is used for "harp". The Indian bow harp is most often used in a religious context related to Buddhism.

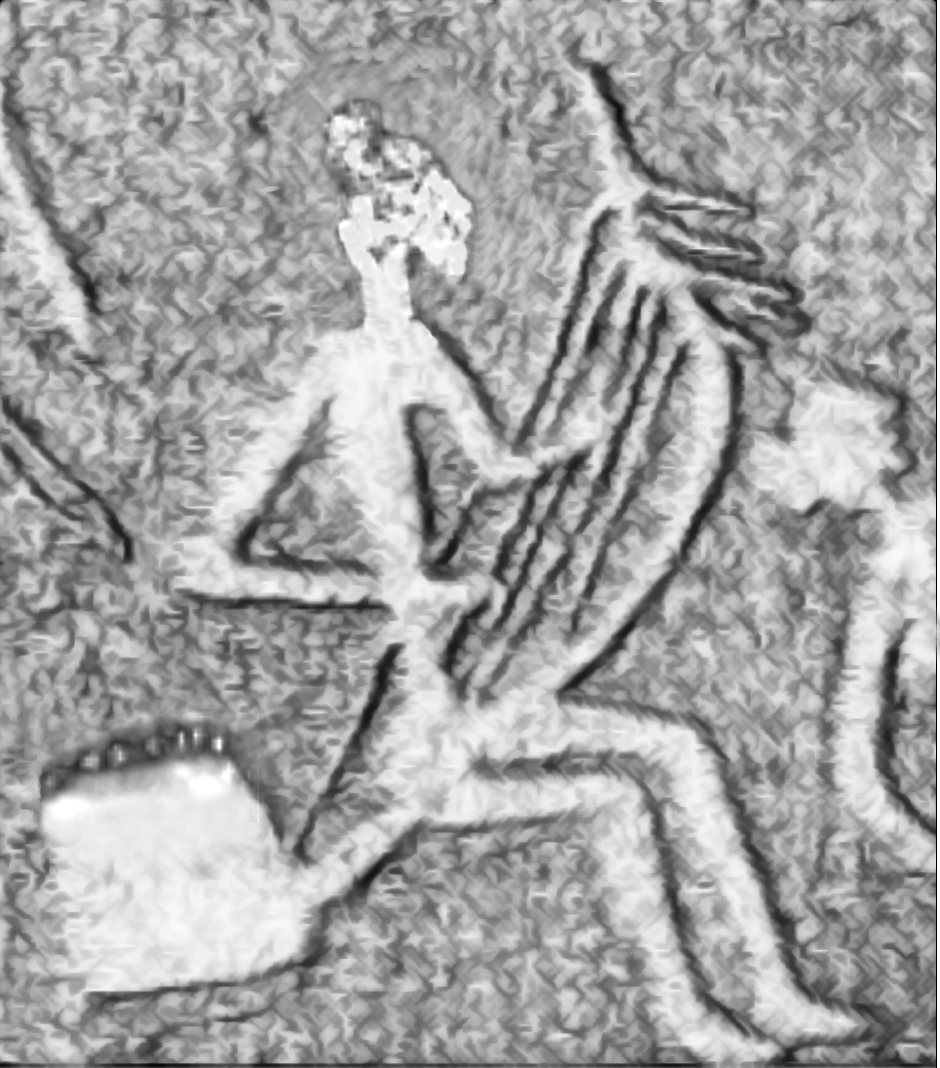
Nimbu Bhoj cave, Pachmarhi, India, date uncertain, possibly 2nd millennium B.C. - 1st millennium B.C. Bronze Age harper playing a bow harp; the resonator for the harp is the box on its end.

Paintings in caves have revealed growth in human culture, as the focus of paintings moved from animals and hunting scenes to images of "ritual participants." In India in the rock caves of Bhimbetka have preserved paintings dating from the Mesolithic (older than 5000 BC) to historical times. In addition to numerous depictions of animals, there are scenes from the "late Bronze Age and Iron Age" of ritual dances and musicians.

Over time, the subject matter of paintings began to change, and "painters shifted from imaginary images to ritual participants." These ritual would come to include music, dancers and musicians. The timeline hasn't been settled.

An early version of the bow harp has been found in 5 cave paintings in the Pachmarhi hills. The harps are bows with 1-5 strings and one end attached to a resonator. The cave names are Batki Bundal, Nimbu Bhoj, Rajat Prapat, Kanji Ghat, and Langi Nadi.

According to the descriptions in the Vedas, the same instrumentation as in Choga Mish—bowed harp, flute, drum and song—was used in the 1st millennium B.C.in ancient India to accompany dancers. Similarly in the shelters in the Pachmarhi hills, all four classes of musical instruments (under Hornbostel-Sachs) can be found in paintings, idiophones, membranophones, chordophones and aerophones.

The modern term vina was originally applied to arched harps, the ancient veena. Literary evidence is found in Brahmana texts (before 6th century B.C.), according to which the harp was said to have had "a hundred strings" (called satatantri).

==== Spread of the arched harp from India ====
India's arched harp spread along the silk road to China. Buddhists carried the instrument with them into Gandhara in northern India (art survives 1st-4th centuries A.D.), and along the silk road to the civilizations including Balkh in Bactria and Samarkand in Sogdia. Images of the arched harp can be seen in Buddhist paintings from the 9th through 11th centuries A.D. in the Mogao Caves (Caves 327 and 465) and Yulin Caves in Dunhuang, China, and the Kizil Caves and Bezeklik Caves (cave 438) in Xinjiang, China. Images have also been found in Khotan in Xinjiang. The Mogao caves marked the furthest point of spread of the arched harp eastward into China along the Silk Road.

Arched harps, Gandhara

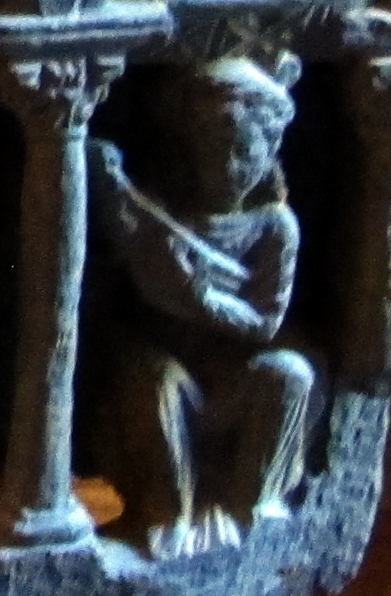
Gandhara harpist. Giuseppe Tucci Museum of Oriental Art

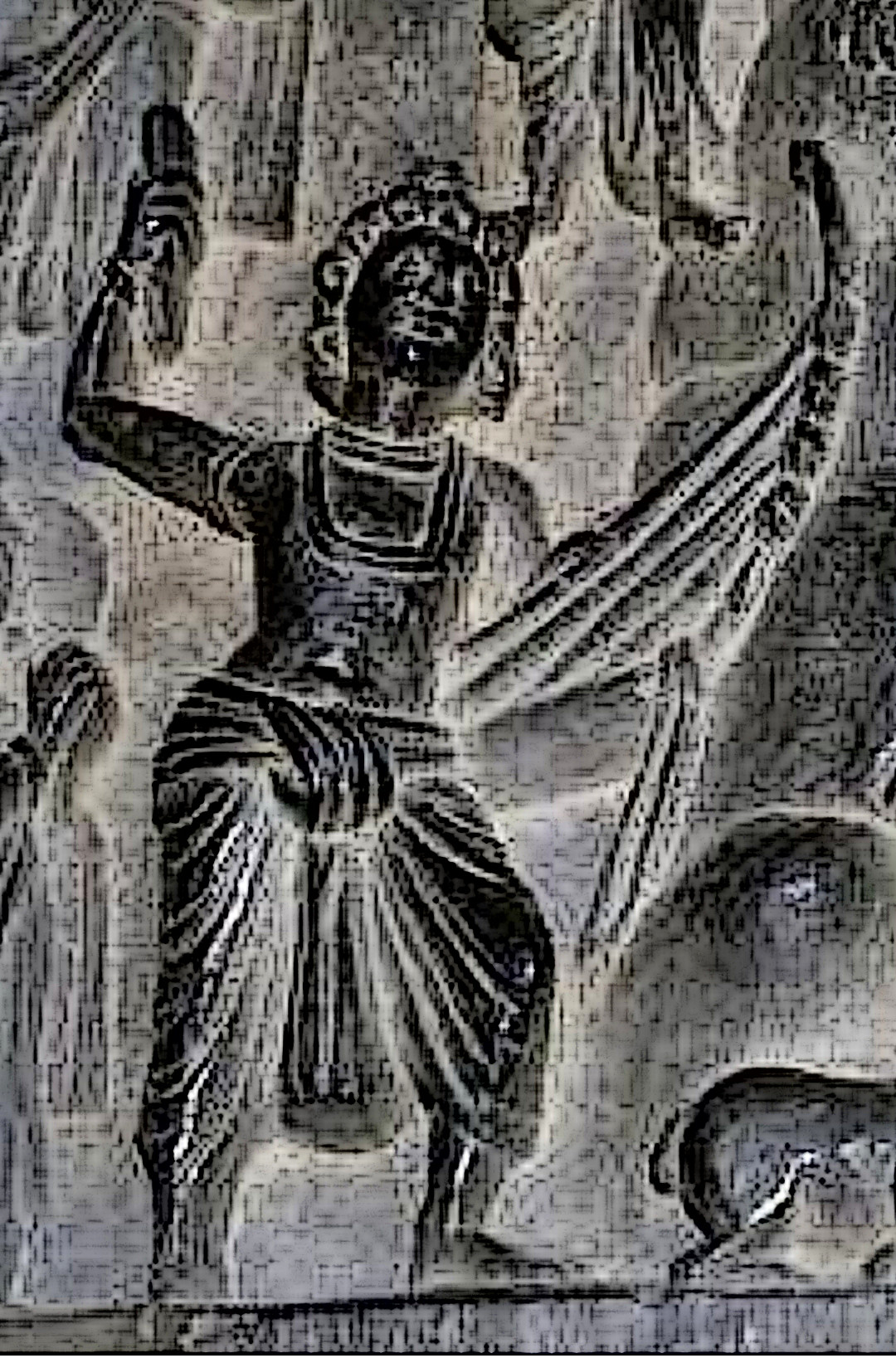
Sikri Yusufzai stupa (3rd-4th century A.D.), Gandhara. Harper holding plectrum in air.

Indian bowed harps have been depicted on stone reliefs at Buddhist cult sites (stupas) from the Sunga period (2nd–1st centuries BC) in central north India, among others: five-string harps on the stupas of Bharhut and Bodhgaya, seven-string harps in Sanchi; also on reliefs at the Butkara stupa in the Swat valley in the Gandhara region (2nd century AD), at the stupas of Amaravati and Nagarjunakonda (both 2nd/3rd centuries AD). Buddha himself, after Jataka 243, was an excellent vina player at the court of Varanasi before retiring from worldly life.

In southern India in the 7th/8th century, harps could have as many as 14 strings and were used for singing accompaniment.

Towards the end of the 1st millennium the bowed harp all but disappeared from India. Harps appear in Indian iconography until the about circa 1000 A.D. Indian arched harps were thought to be lost until 1983, when the bin-baja of the Pardhan of Madhya Pradesh was noticed by ethnomusicologist Roderic Knight, one surviving relic of India's arched-harp tradition. One reason the harp remained hidden for so long is that it is mainly used for private religious expression, and the musicians who play the instrument take special care not to play it publicly outside of ceremony. The bin-baja (bīṇ bājā, also Gogia bana) is a five-string arched harp in the Mandla area of the central Indian state of Madhya Pradesh, played by male musicians of the Pardhan caste to accompany epic songs. The harp has a boat-shaped body and a string connector in a sawtooth pattern, with bamboo laid beneath the strings. Only the musicians of the Gogia, a small social subgroup of the Pardhans, play the bin-baja for their patrons, the Gonds, instead of the bowed lute bana that Pardhans otherwise use to accompany songs.

Outside of India arched harps have survived in places culturally connected to India. These include the waji of Nuristan, the 5-7 string t'nah or na den or 6-string tinaou of the Karen from Thailand and Myanmar, and the saung of Burma.

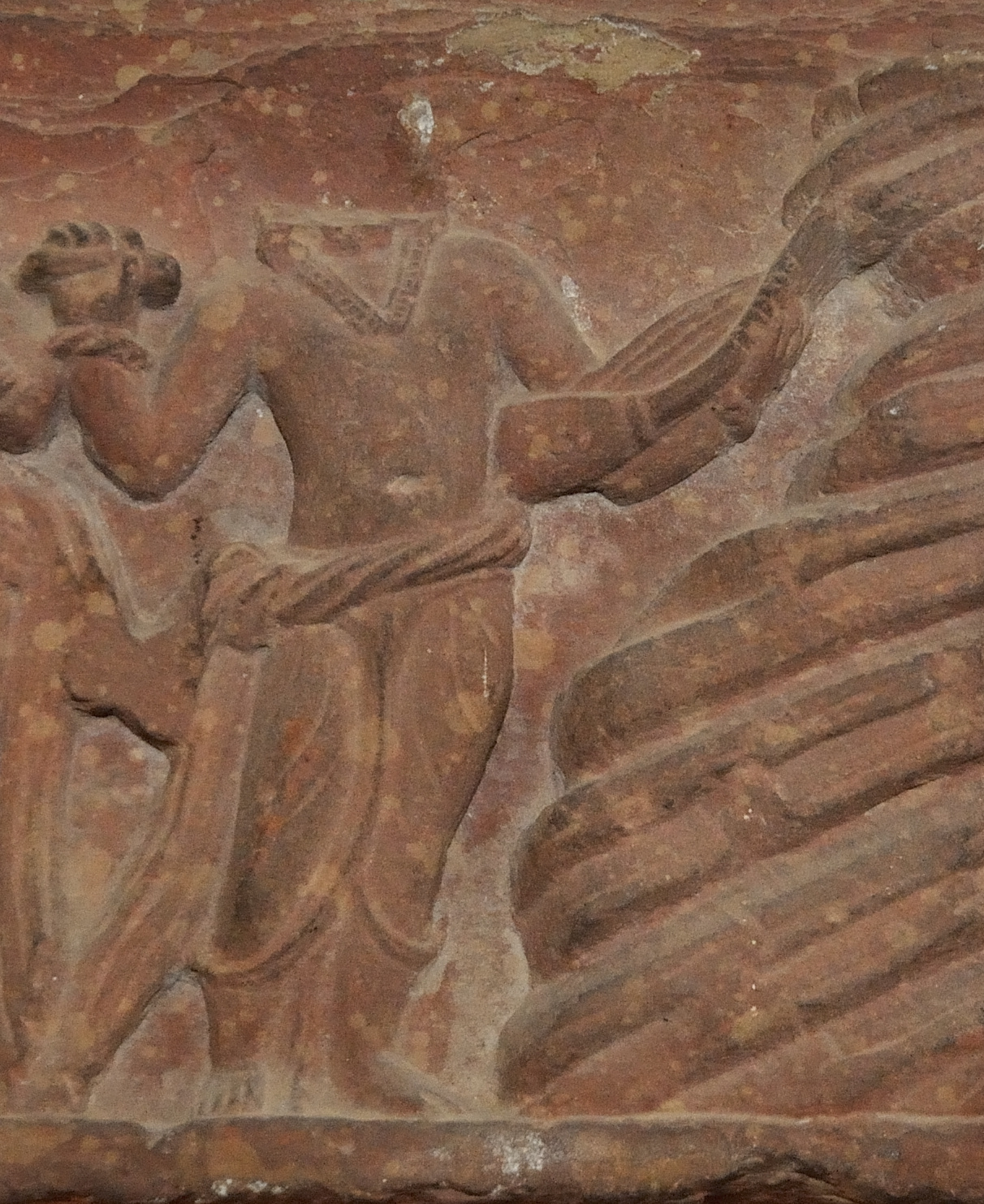
Harpist, Mathura-school artwork, Mathura, Northern India, 1st century C.E. Horizontal bow-harp, the striker to play the strings is held in the Harper's raised hand.

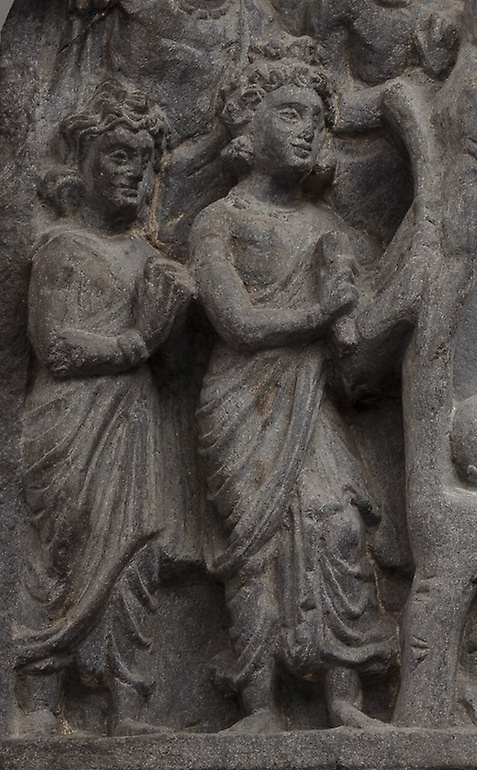
Gandhara harpist, bow harp, 100-300 A.D. Horizontal bow-harp, played with striker. The harp is being held on the neck, over the strings.

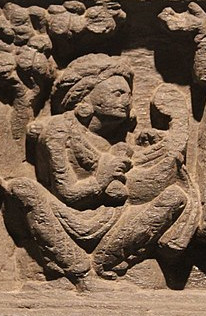
Arched harp from Gandhara, 2nd century A.D. Found at Loriyan Tangai, Pakistan.

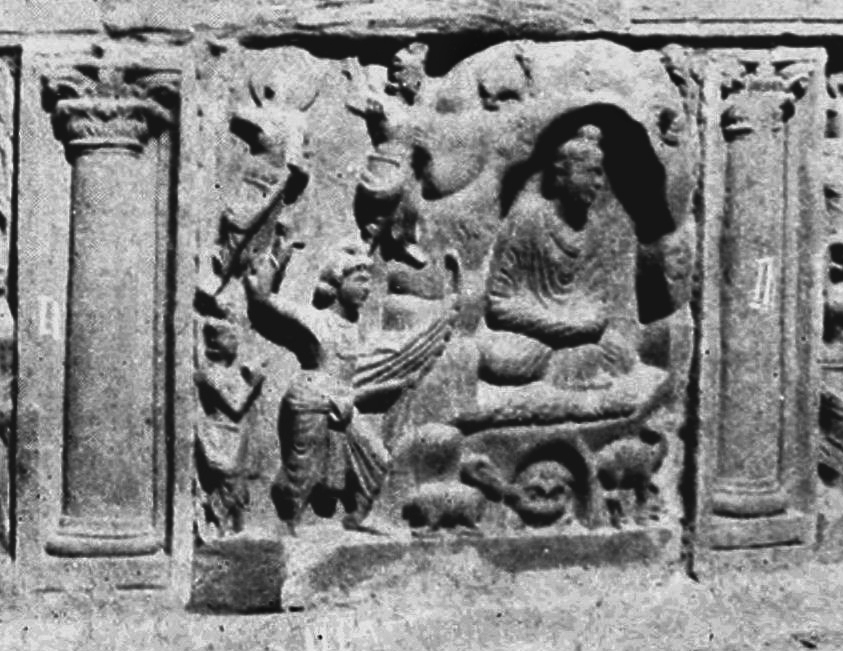
Buddhist artwork from Gandhara, Sikri Yusufzai stupa, 3rd-4th century A.D. Indra and his harpist visit the Buddha in Indrasala Cave.

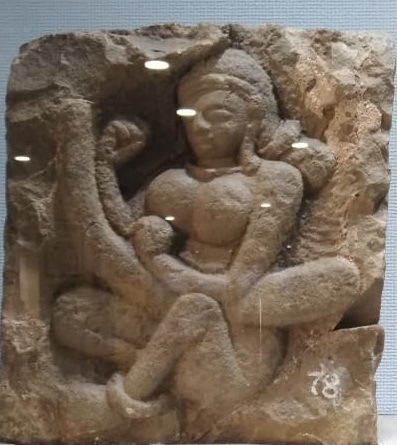
Saraswati playing an arched harp, 3rd century A.D. Manasa-Mandsaur area of Madhya Pradesh, India. Unlike the Gandhara images, this image shows the harp being played with both hands and not with a plectrum.

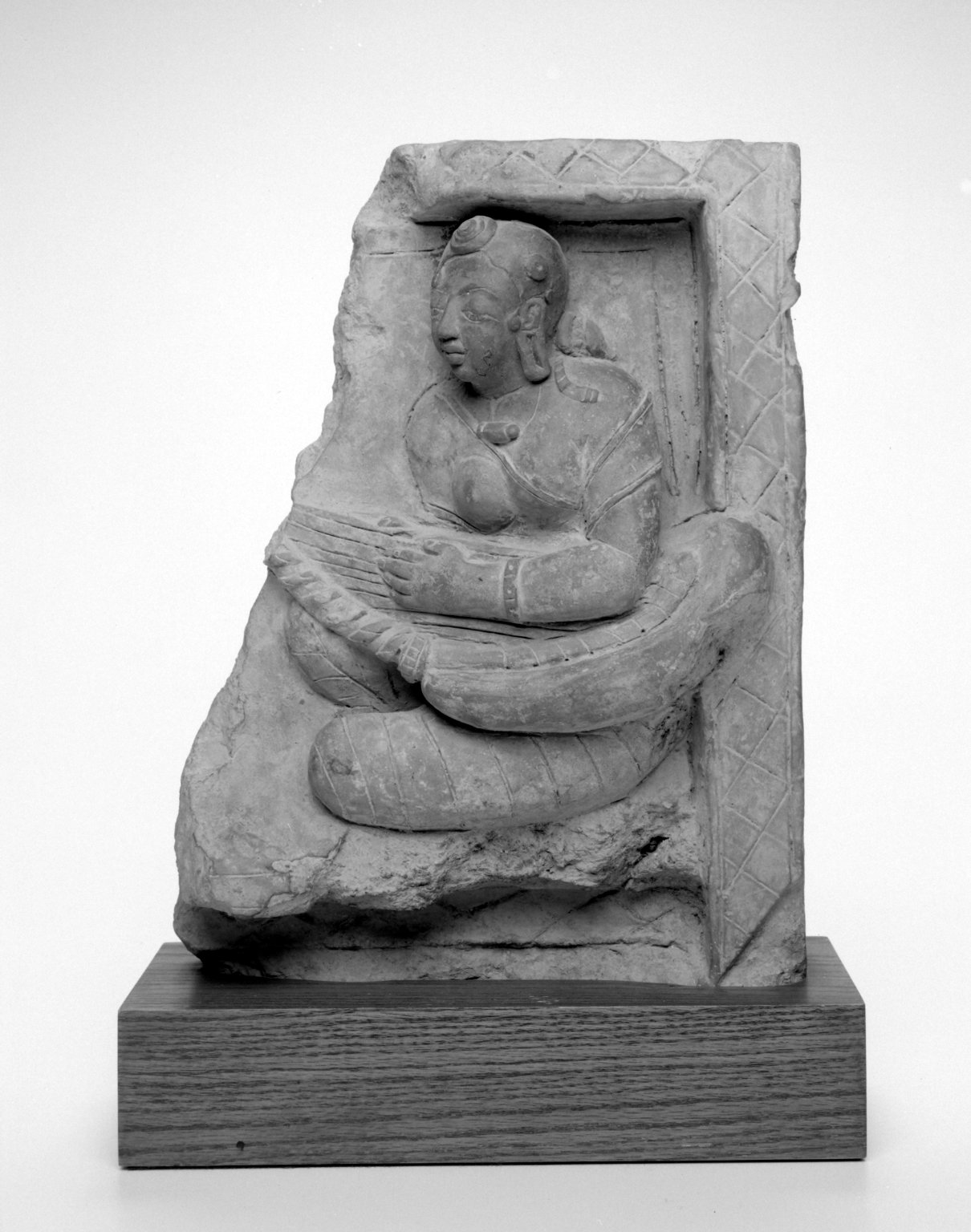
5th century A.D. sculpture from the Gupta Empire, India, showing a lady playing an arched harp.

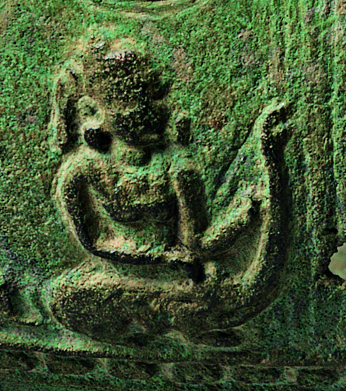
5th-6th century A.D. India, decorated bowl with harp vina. Southern India, probably Andhra Pradesh

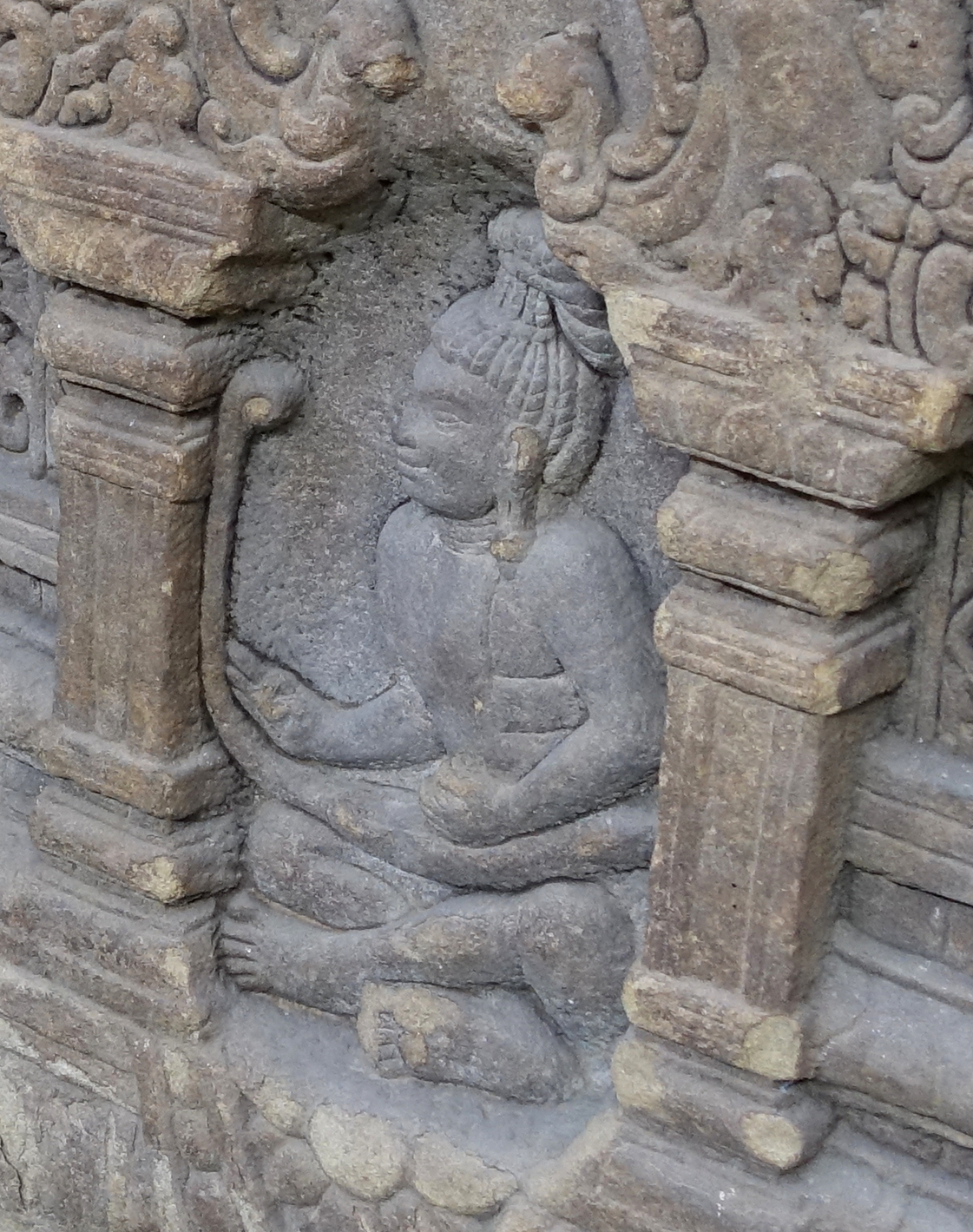
Vietnam, Champa arched harp, Mỹ Sơn, 7th century

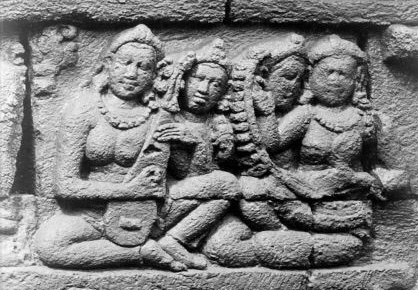
Borobudur lute and harp, 9th century CE

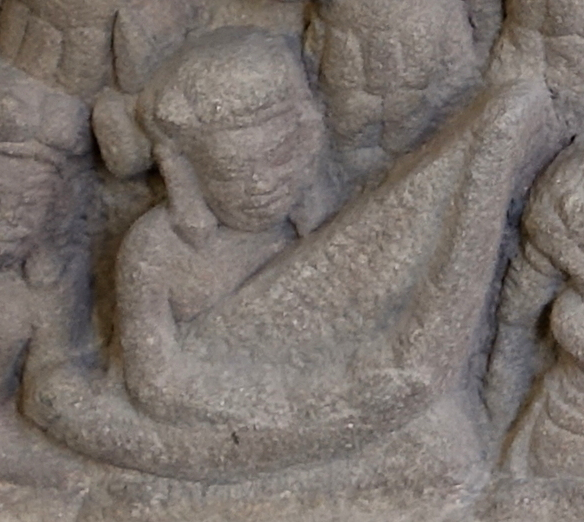
Vietnam, Champa harp, part of relief sculpture from Phong Lệ, 10th century.

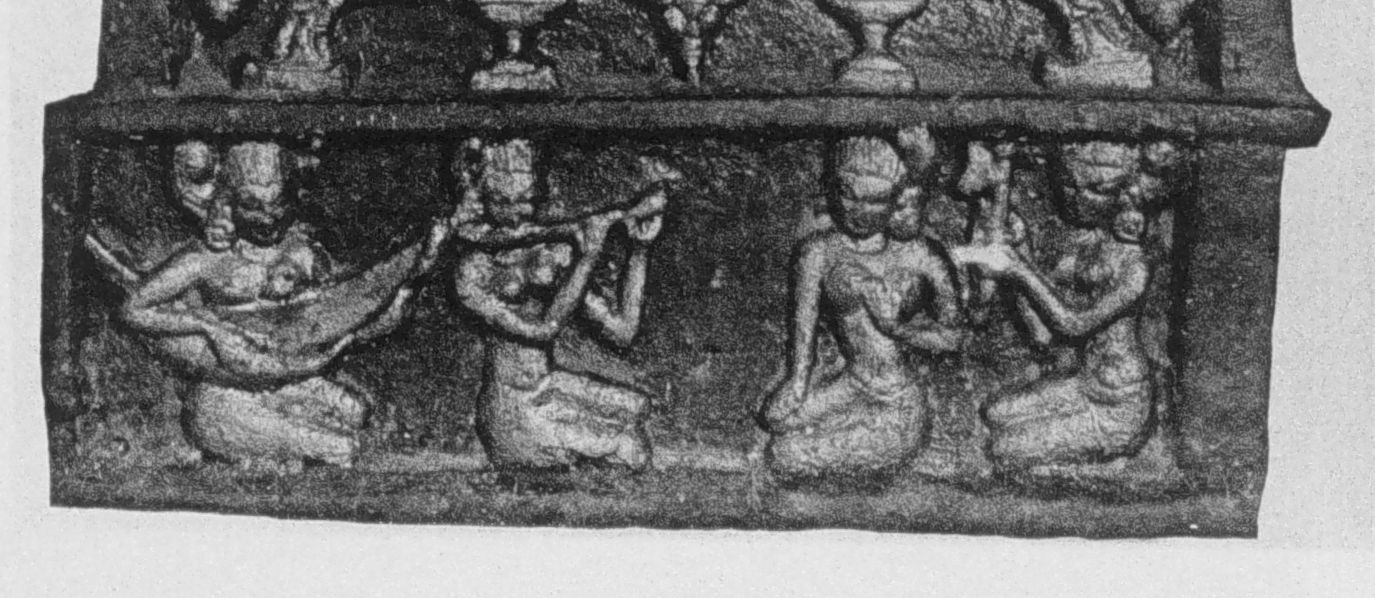
12th century A.D., Ananda Temple at Bagan, Myanmar

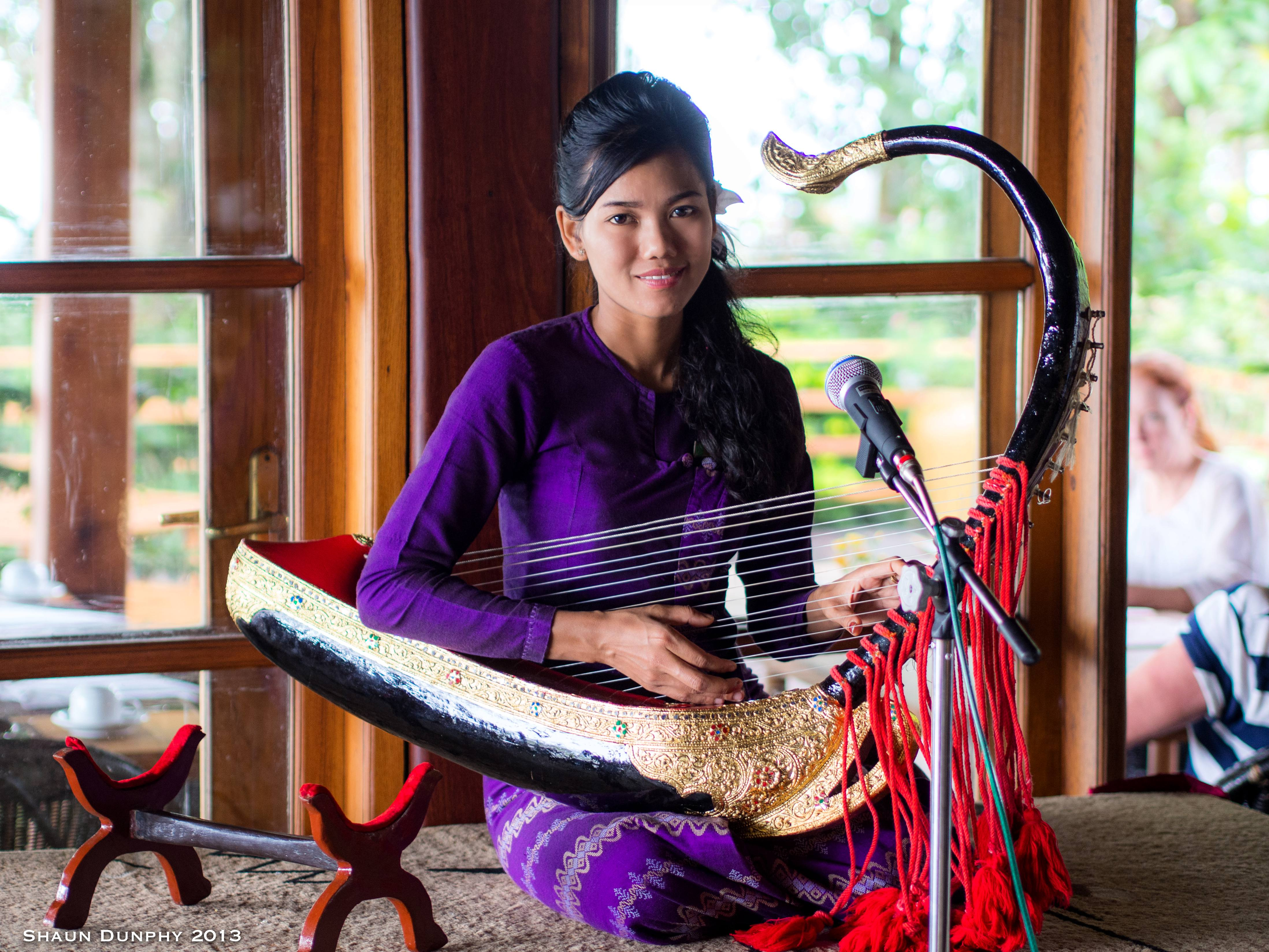
Modern saung

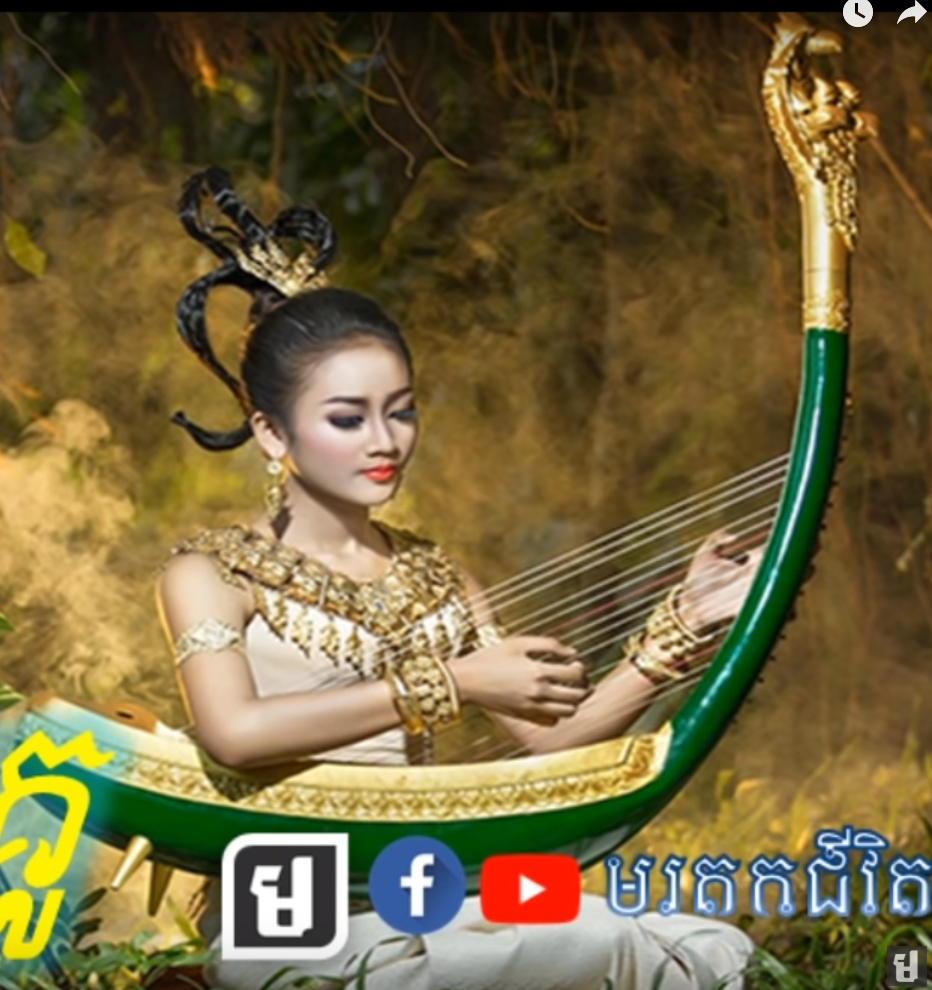
A Cambodian woman plays a modern pin.

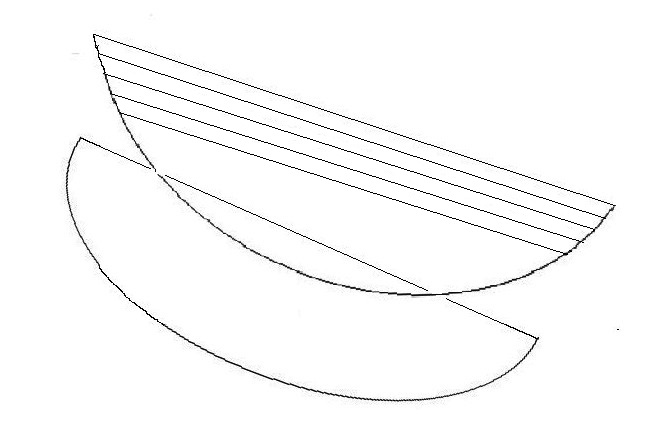
Line drawing of a Kafir harp.

==== Nuristan ====
Overland from India in north-eastern Afghanistan, the Nuristani people have the Kafir harp or waji, though the instrument has become rare. To make it, a musical bow is embedded into the resonator's skin soundboard through two holes, resting with the open arch of the bow facing the sky. The resonator is boat shadows with incurved sides, each end of the boat pointed. The resonating skin soundboard is stretched across the bowl of the resonator and the edges are pulled and secured on the resonator's bottom side with a thong sewn through the edges. The bow is held tight to the resonator with chords running from each end of the resonator to the closest side of the bow.

The player, seated on the floor or on a chair, holds the waji cradled in his left arm. The strings are in an approximately horizontal position and are strummed with a pine plectrum in the right hand. The plucking is usually done in an up and down motion across all strings. Strings that are not meant to sound are muted with the fingers of the left hand gripping from the outside.

==== Southeast Asia, Burma ====
Arched harps spread to Southeast Asia to create the saung in Burma, the pin in Cambodia, the t'na of the Karen and Mon peoples, the harp seen in ancient artwork from Champa in Vietnam, and the harps displayed in Malaysia in the reliefs of Borobudur.

Southeast Asian harps

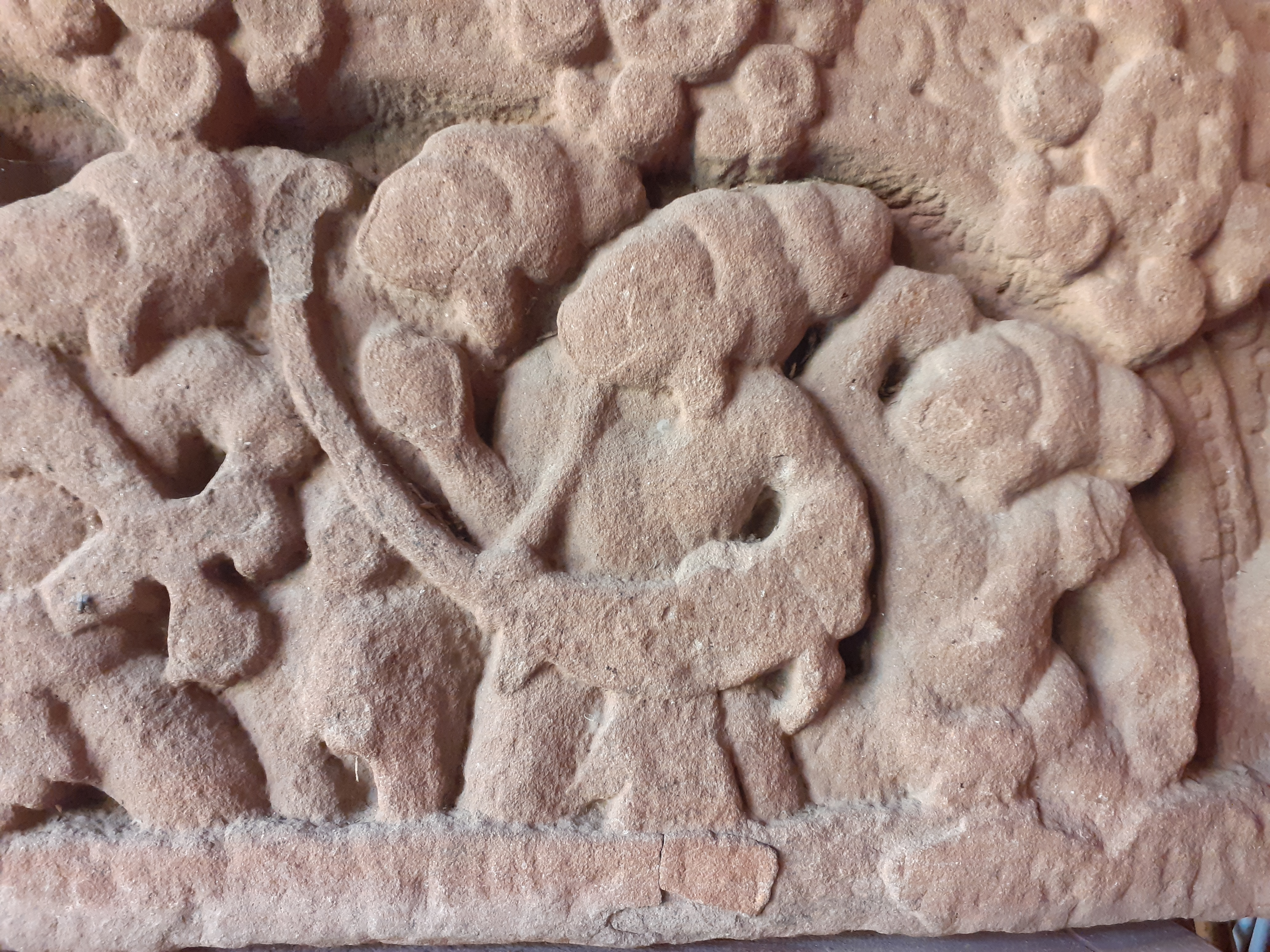
Khmer pin harp from Sambor Prei Kuk. 7th c. National Museum of Cambodia.

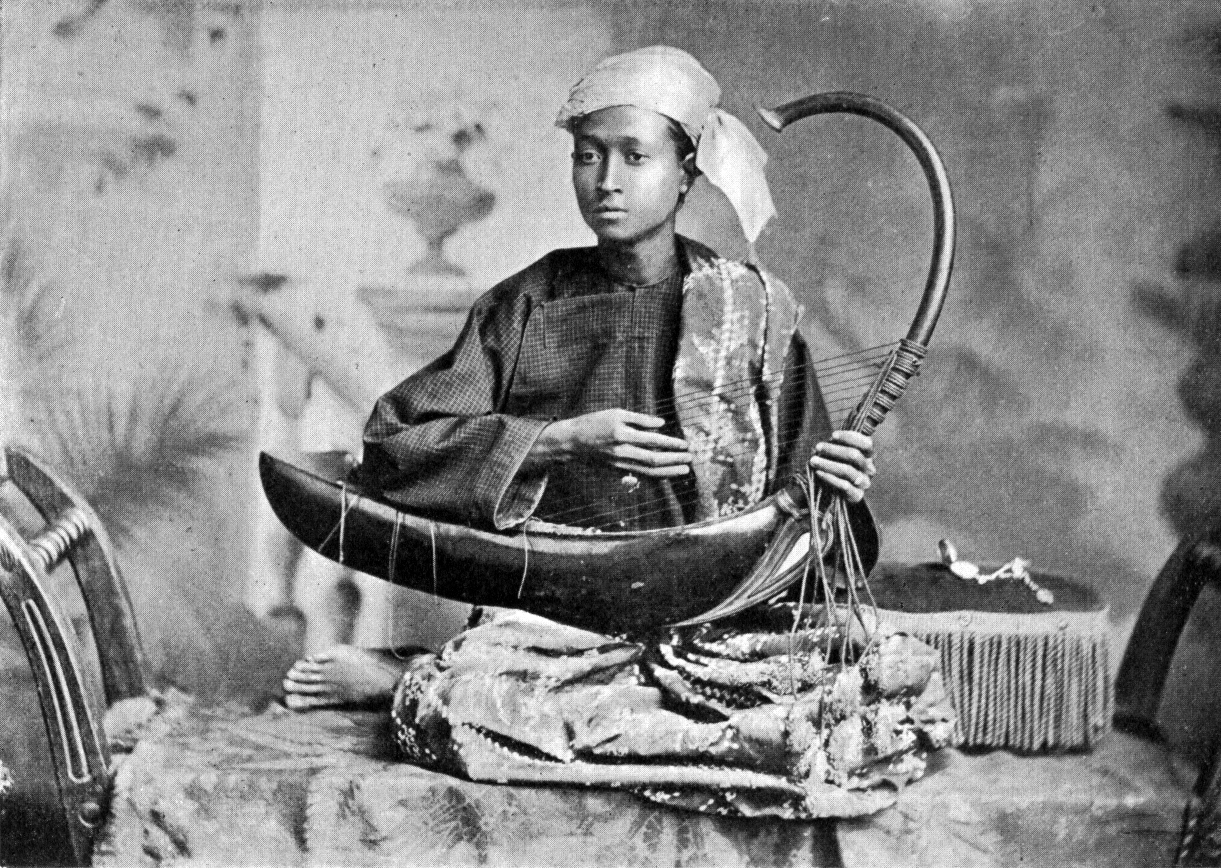
A saung musician in 1900.

The saung entered Burma between pre-500 A.D. to after 800 A.D. The dates represent modern debates among researchers. 800 A.D. and after is based on medieval Burmese artwork from 1000 to 1200 A.D. and the relationship between Burma and Bengal in that same period. Before 500 A.D. represents the idea that the harp was found in earlier Pyu artwork which resembled the Amaravati harp (200-400 A.D.) and on the relationship between India and the Pyus in the 1st-5th centuries A.D.

The earliest archaeological evidence of the harp is at the Bawbawgyi Pagoda of the Sri Ksetra kingdom of the Pyu people, near present-day Pyay (Prome). At that site, there a relief sculpture from the mid-600s that depicts an arched harp with about five strings, in a scene with musicians and a dancer. The artwork dates to the era of expansion of Buddhism into Burma. Other evidence for an early date for the arrival of the harp in Burma comes from Chinese chronicles from the 801-802 A.D. documents from China. In that period, the Pyu Kingdom sent an embassy to China, with an orchestra of Burmese musical instruments, including two types of arched harp – a 14-string, long-necked harp topped with a phoenix head projecting forward, and a harp that curved inward. Both types were found in Amaravati artwork form 200-400 A.D.

The Saung gauk is still present in Burma as a living tradition. The instrument was played in the royal court until the end of the kingdom. There followed a period of decline before World War II. Then in 1947, Hmat Kyi, who descended from royal woodcarvers, created 7 harps for the State Schools of Fine Arts. While rare today, there are still craftsmen in the country making the instruments. At the university level, musicologists are working to expand harp education in the country.

==== Southeast Asia, Cambodia ====
In Cambodia a harp called the pin (Khmer: ពិណ, pĭn [pɨn]) was one of the most historically important instruments in Cambodian music. Originating in India, the instrument can be seen in ancient artwork. Its historical importance is emphasized by the very name for Cambodian classical music, pinpeat (Khmer: ពិណពាទ្យ). Cambodians stopped using the pin sometime between the 13th and 15th centuries A.D. The instrument is now being restored in modern times.

==== Karen harp ====
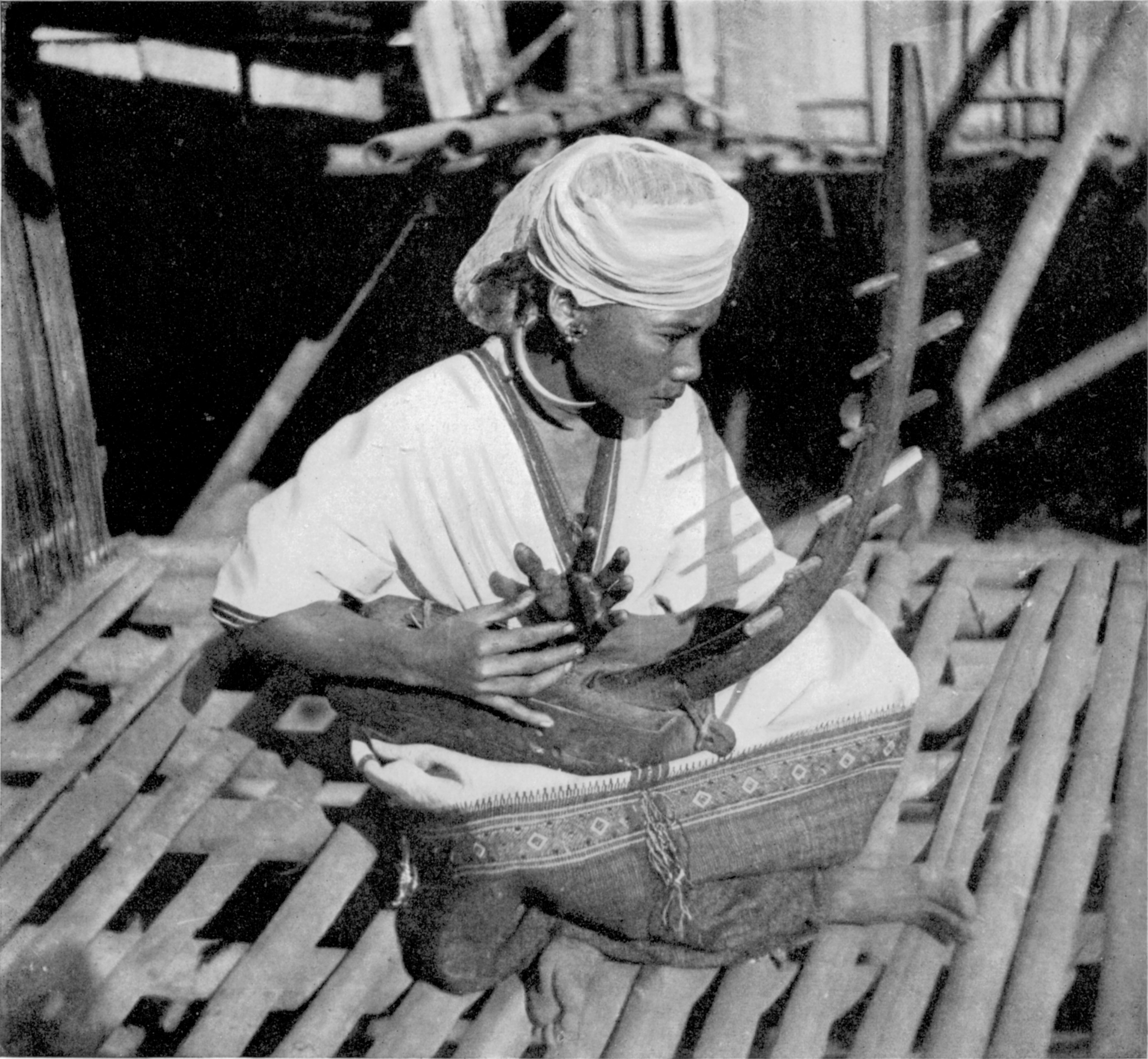
Sgaw Karen youth, playing t' nah arched harp, 1920 A.D. The instrument is also called na den.

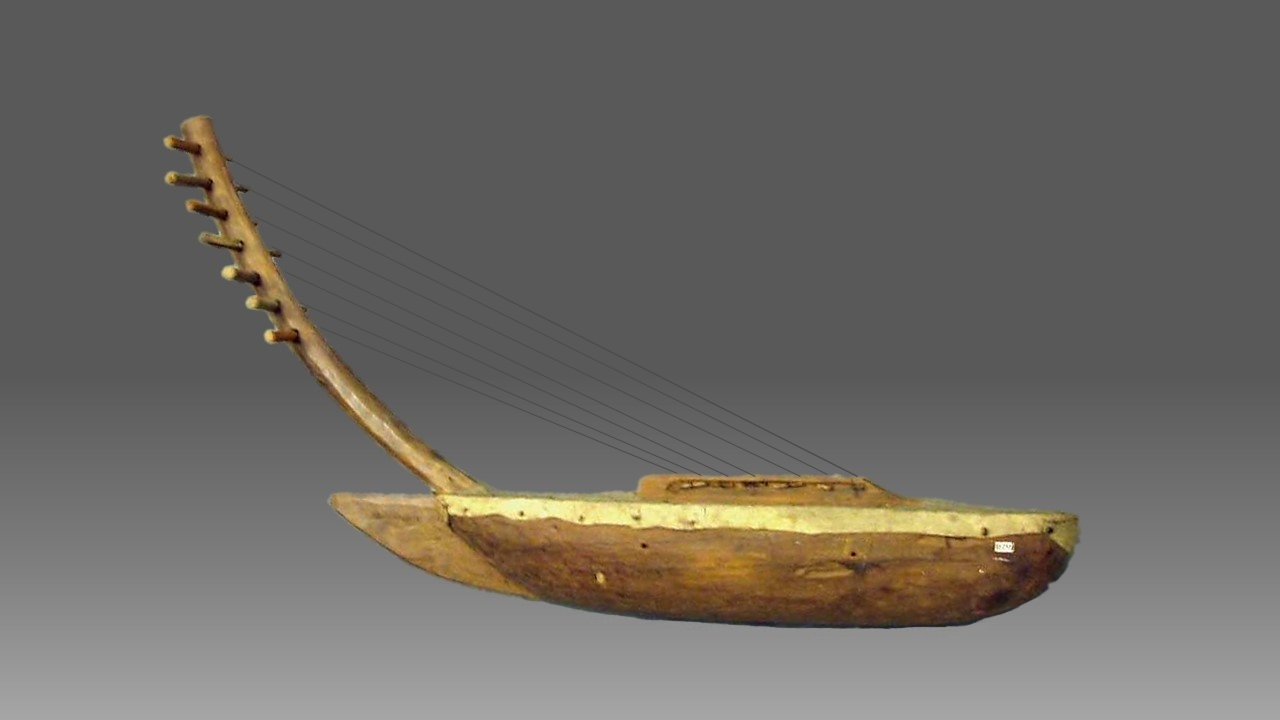
T'na harp, Karen people, Myanmar, 19th century.

Although the instrument could be strummed, the harpist in the above left photo is using fingers for each string, possibly damping strings as well as sounding specific strings.

A third arched harp belongs to the Karen and Mon peoples: the t'na (also called tenaku). The Karen harp is usually made with five or seven strings, but may have as many as 10 to 12 strings to play contemporary songs. Traditionally, harp strings were made of braided hemp thread or bamboo-vine fiber, coated with beeswax. Later cotton strings were used. Today it may be strung with silk or nylon strings or wire strings. The instrument was "strummed" and had a soft tone.

In making the t'na, it is divided into two parts, the body part and the head part. The body is usually made of one type of wood and the headstock is made of another type of wood. The body of the harp is made of hard wood hollowed out, resembling a dugout canoe with one end sharper than the other, about two feet long, 5 inches wide. The soundboard might be made of barking deer hide. Two holes are drilled in the sides of the body.

The neck of the Karen harp is not curved as far inward as the Burmese saung harp. The head of the harp is made from naturally curved wood attached to the body, inserted into the sharp end. Pegs in the neck are used to tighten the strings, the other end of the strings going to a strip of wood attached to the middle of the soundboard.

According to Harry Ignatius Marshall, who was with the Karen prior to 1922, the t'na was used primarily by young men, who frequently carried the harp with them.

He reported that the t'na was used in courtship in the early 20th century. Young men would play for young women, who would answer with a t'xe mouth harp. The two could sit together, her parents listening; so long as they could hear instruments playing, the young people could have privacy.

The Karen have also made the t'na with a bamboo body, resulting in an instrument with greater resonance. The opening for the skin soundboard was made on one side of the tube, between two nodes in the bamboo. The skin was stretched across the opening and tied on the opposite side of the tube.

=== China ===
Buddhist artwork

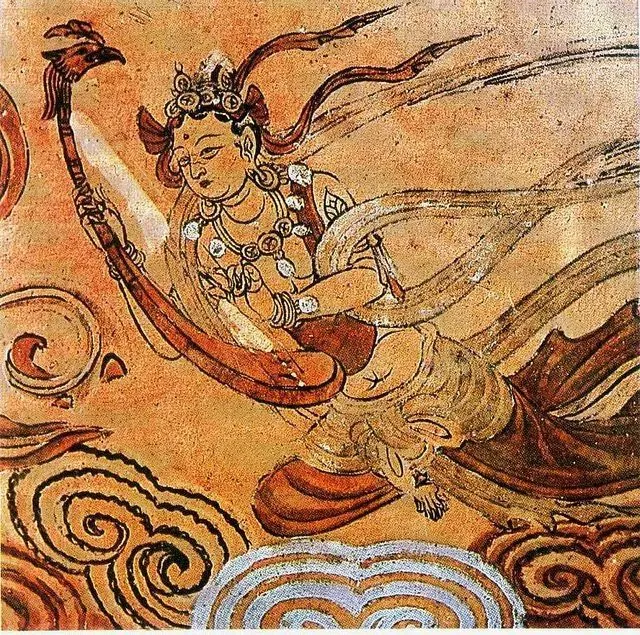
Phoenix headed konghou harp in the hands of a flying apsara, Mogao Caves, cave 327. Western Xia (1036-1226 A.D.)

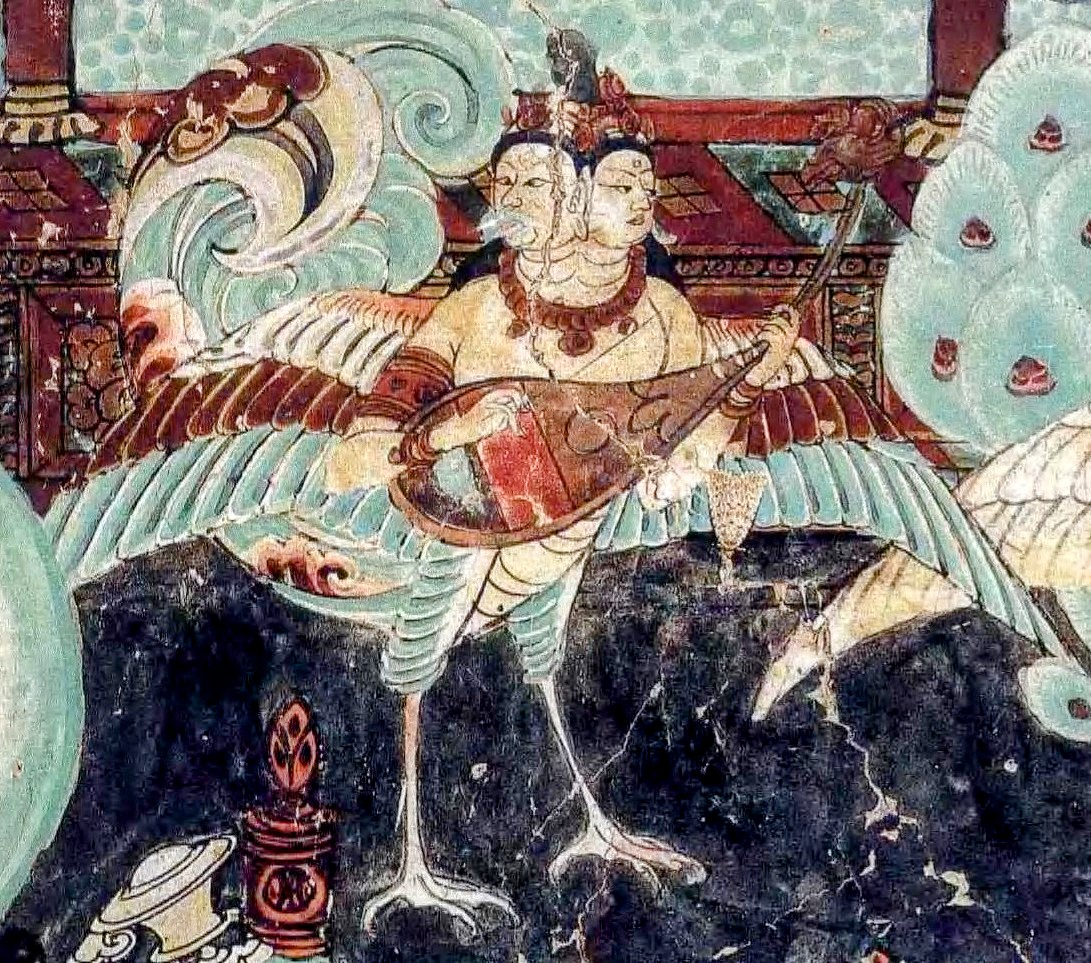
Yulin Grottoes, cave 25. Bird of Life (共命鸟) or Kalaviṅka, playing Phoenix-headed Konghou (凤首箜篌). Instrument also resembles pipa. Circa 800 C.E.

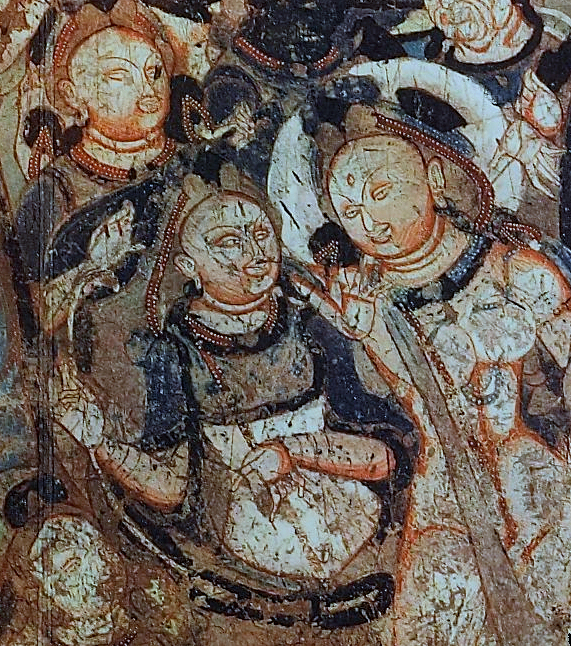
A woman plays a Qiu-Zi arched harp while a dancing man leans against her. Cave 181, Kizil Caves, 7th century A.D. The harp has a resonator made from a kidney-shaped gourd.

(left two:) Two members of Buddhist mythology play phoenix headed konghou harps, here shown with a bird's head on the top of each instrument. (right:) Image cropped to show Buddhist devotees singing, playing and dancing in a crowd surrounding Buddha figures, visible in the full image.

Arched harps migrated to China from India by way of Gandhara, Bactria and Sogdia. Additionally, Burma sent musicians to play in the Chinese court, including two types of arched harp. One of the harps had a neck longer than the instrument's body, "the end of the neck...turned outward and the apex shaped like the head of a phoenix". This was like the later Chinese feng shou konghou (鳳首箜篌, literally "phoenix-headed konghou"), an arched harp, thought to have been introduced from India in the Eastern Jin dynasty (317–420 AD). "Beginning in the Sui dynasty (581–618), it was also used in yanyue (banquet music)." The arched harp probably disappeared in China after 1000 A.D., coinciding with the decline of Buddhism. The angular harp lasted longer than the arched harp in China, becoming extinct sometime in the Ming dynasty (1368 to 1644).

Chinese musical researcher Li Mei (李玫) mentioned that in the artwork in China, two kinds of arched harps can be seen. One of them appears to be the standard Indian arched harp, which became the modern saung. This kind has a long wooden body and a high arched neck, carved to meet smoothly. The other type is the Qiu-Zi arched harp, named for the Qiu-Zi Grottos (Kizil Grottos). This harp appears to have been made with the body of a gourd, looking somewhat like a bean and not transitioning into the instrument's neck as smoothly as the Indian arched harp. The harp is only depicted in the Kizil Grottoes, which is why it was named for them.

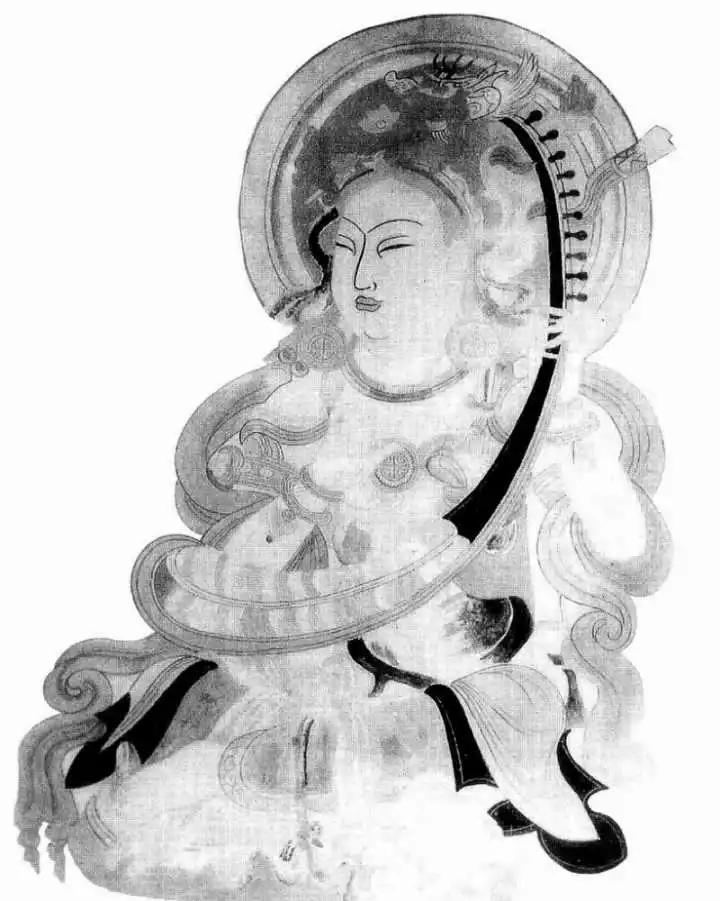
Phoenix headed konghou (Konghou fengshou), 10th century A.D., Bezeklik Caves, cave 48.

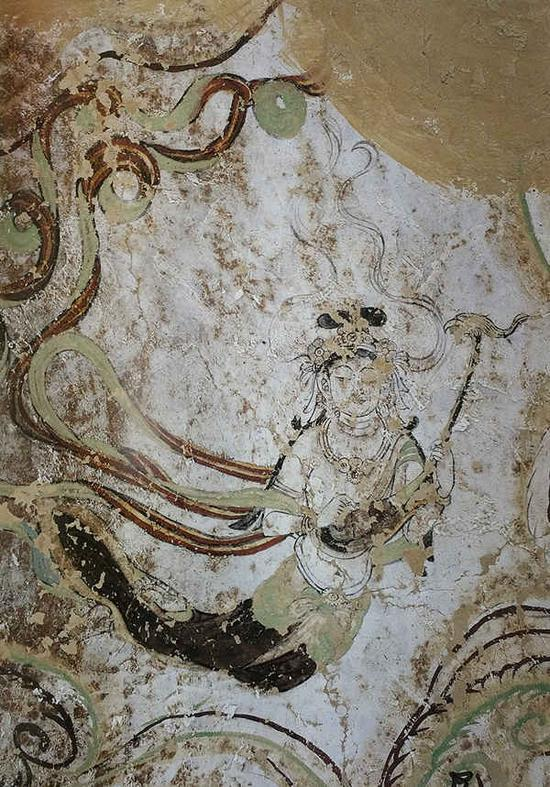
Apsara or Feintian (flying goddess 飛天女神) playing a Phoenix-headed konghou - Yulin Cave 15. Tang dynasty artistry, (618-907)

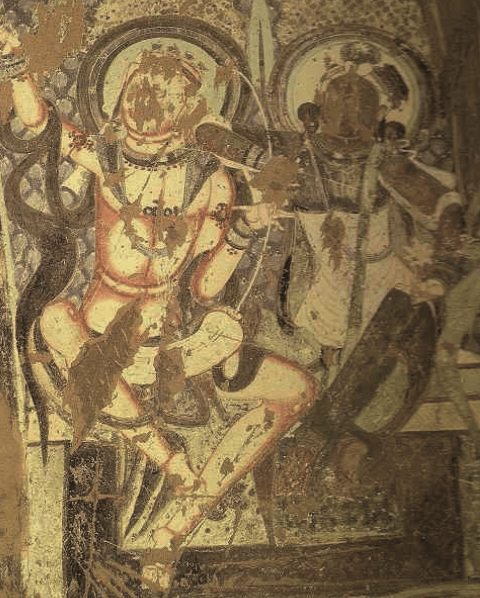
Arched harp, Kizil Cave 77, circa 7th century A.D. (Alternately dated 3rd-9th centuries A.D.)

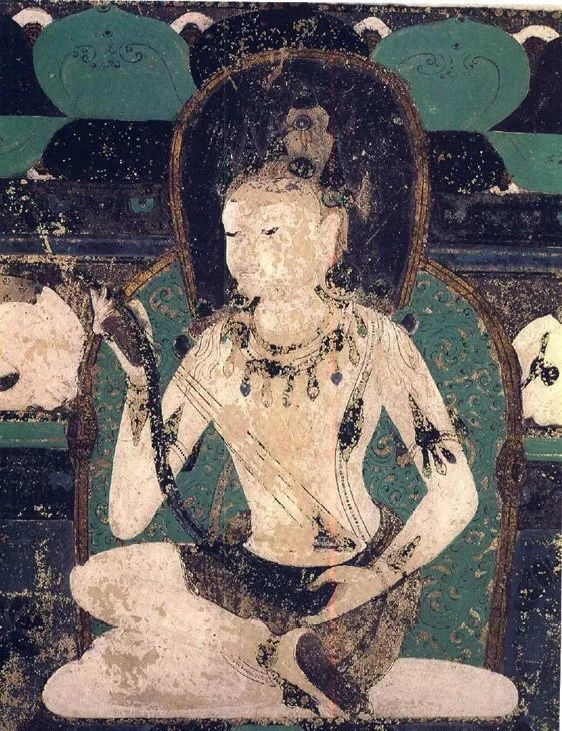
Mogao Cave 465, Tibetan-style bow harp. Yuan dynasty, 1227–1368.

=== Egypt ===
Types as seen in Egypt

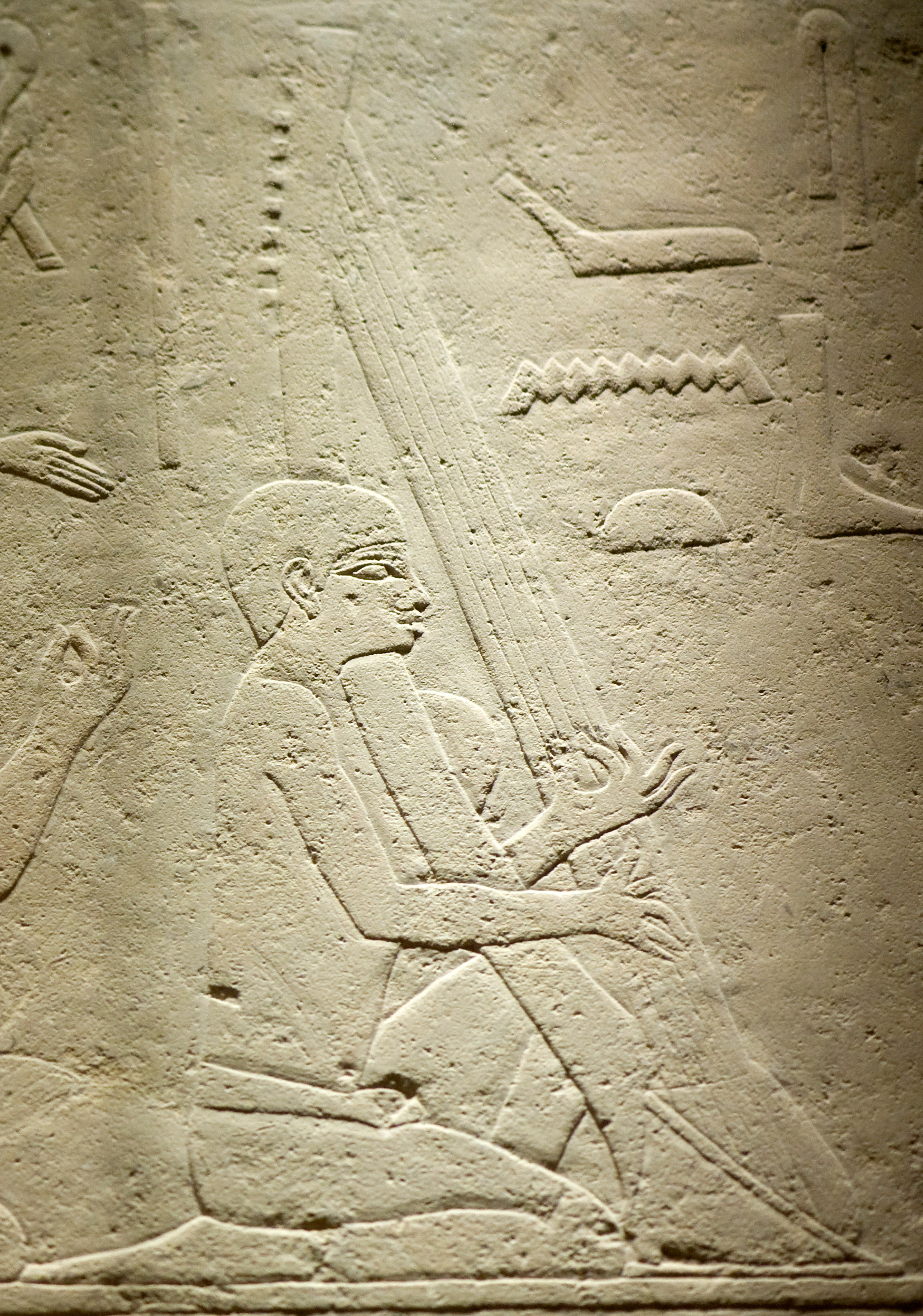
Shovel harp. Funerary chapel of Hetepherakhet, Old Kingdom, 5th dynasty, circa 2400 B.C.

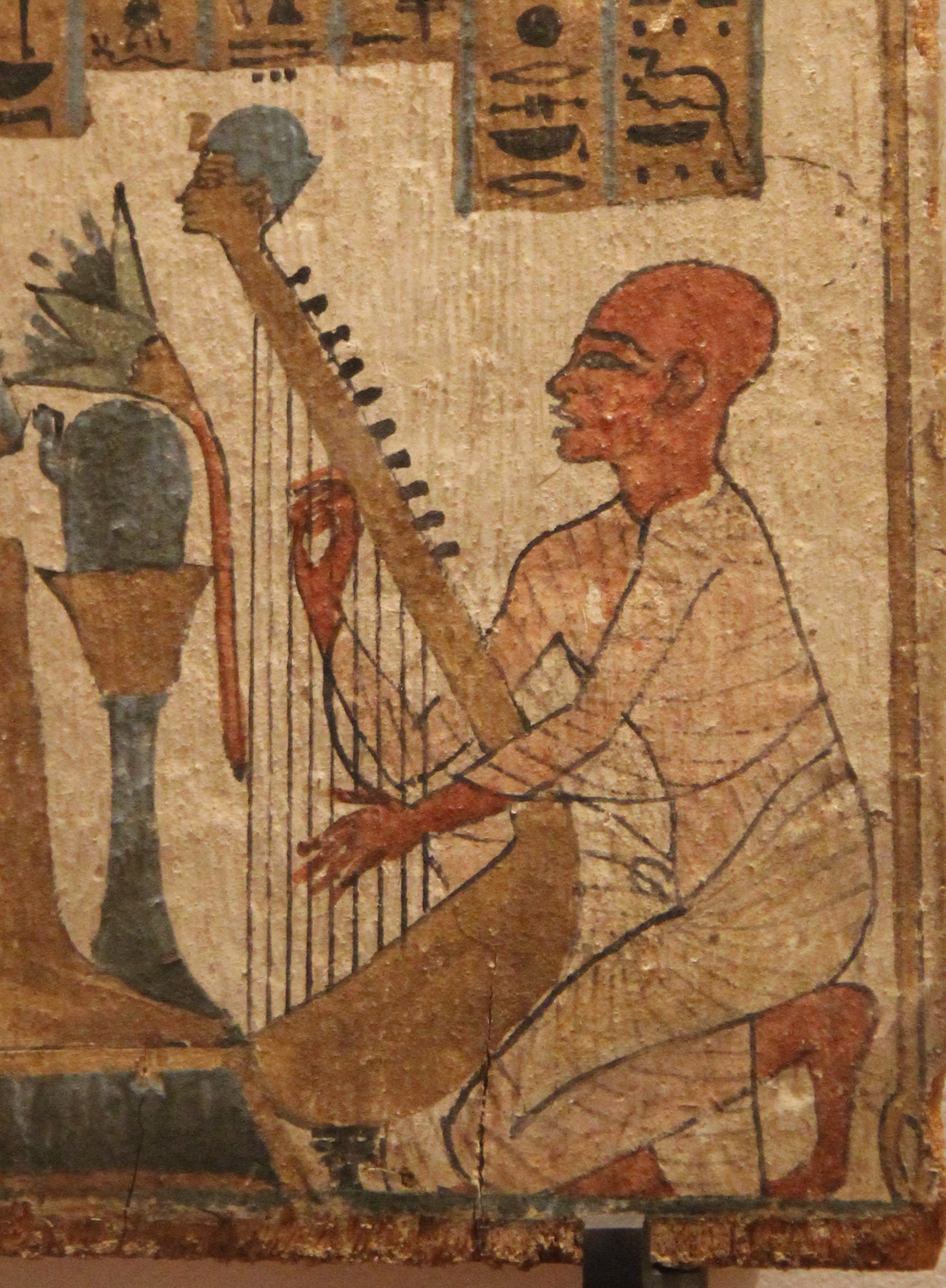
Ladle harp. 3rd Intermediate Period (1064-664 BC).

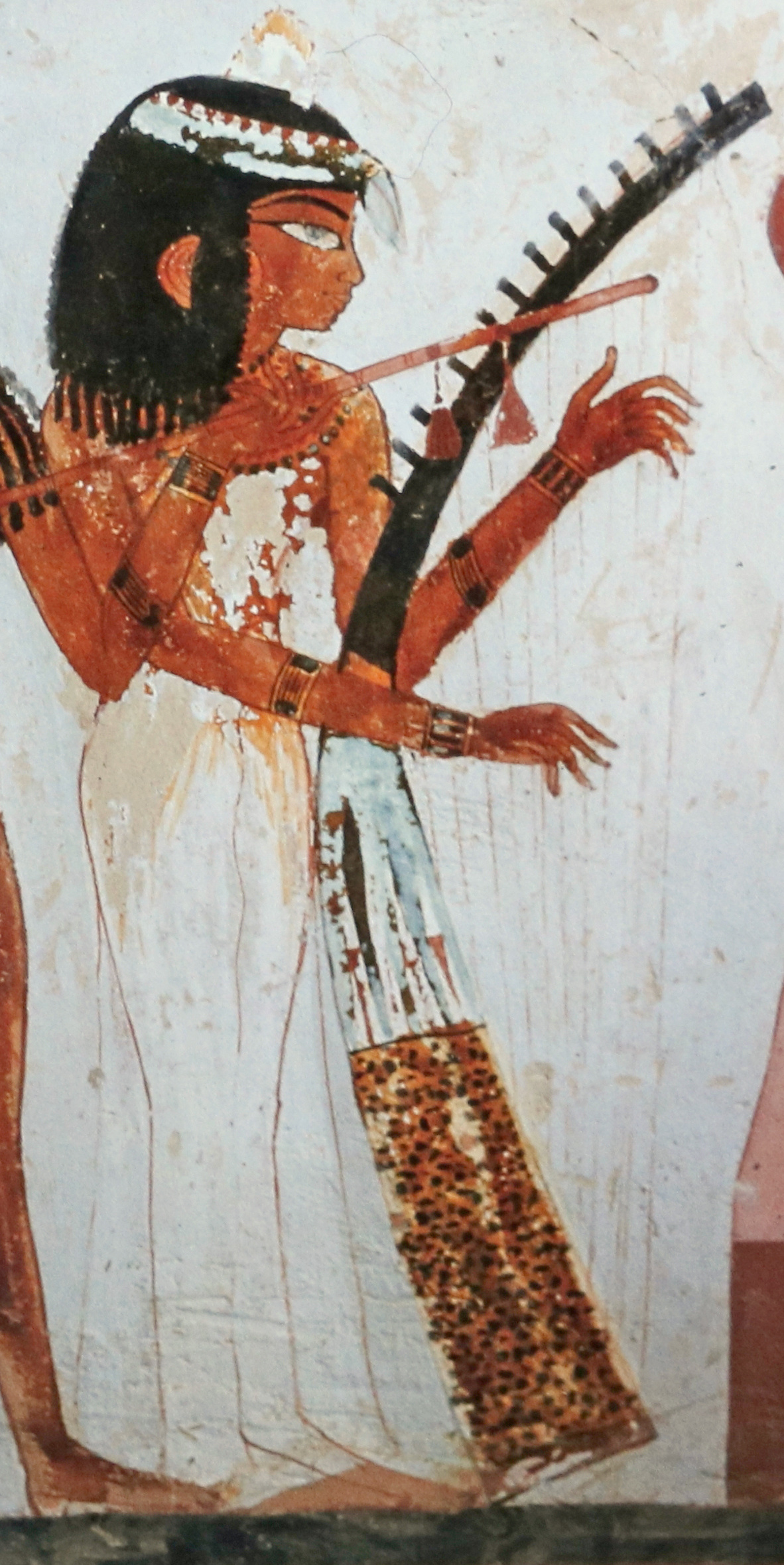
Naviform vertical harp. Tomb of Nakht, Thebes, circa 1422-1411 BCE

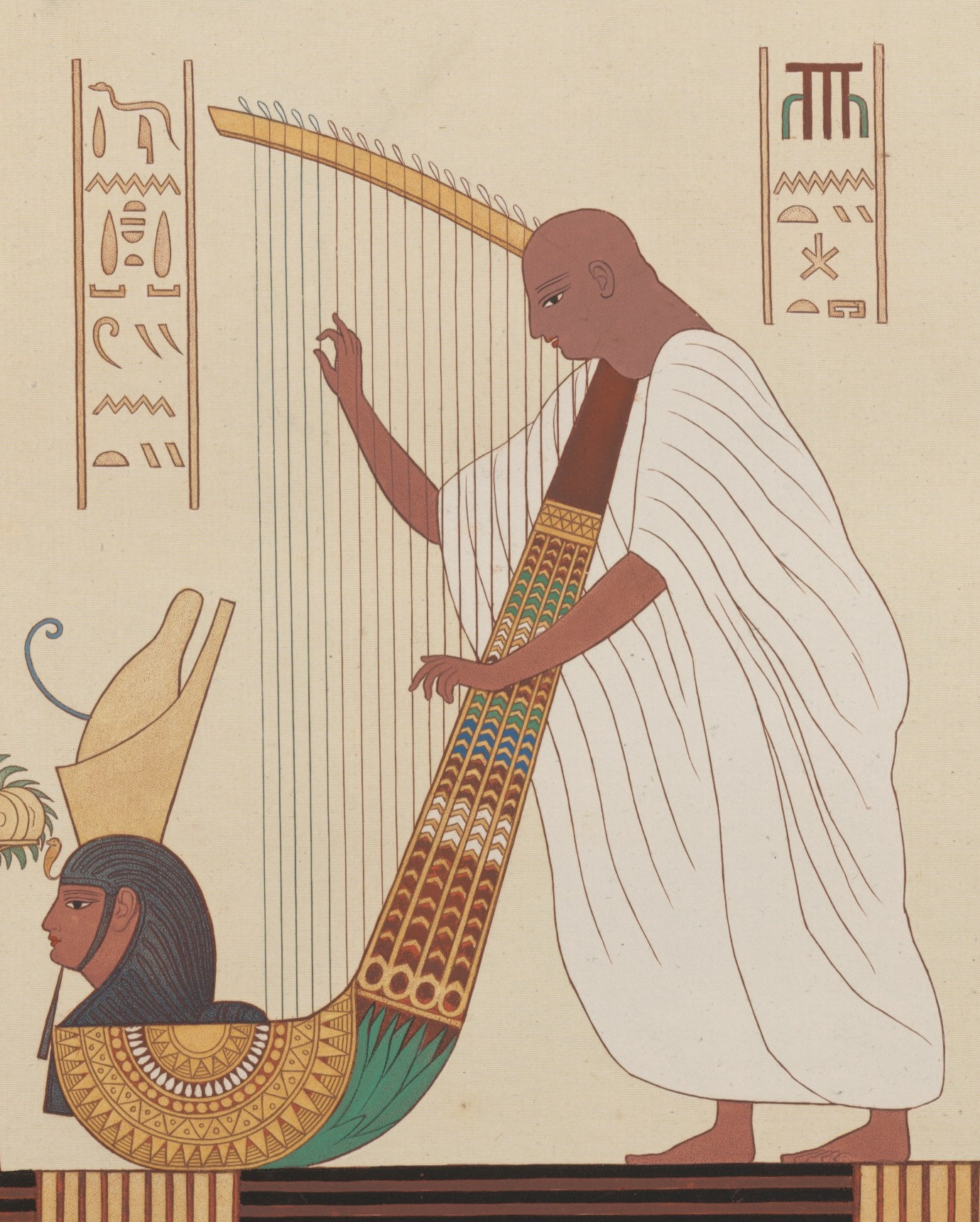
Arch shape, or crescent. Harper, Tomb of Ramses III, 1186-1155 B.C. illustrated in 1809.

According to Bo Lawergren, organologist researcher, current understanding of the Egyptian harps shows that the first Egyptian harps were shovel shaped, from about 2632-1562 B.C. From about 1562 B.C the shovel shape was largely gone, replaced by boat shaped and ladle shaped instruments, with some shoulder harps and angular harps. From 1076-332B.C. shovel and angular harps were dominant, with some ladle, 7-shaped and boat shaped harps. From 332 to 32 B.C., angular harps and crescent harps had taken over.

The harp was the most important musical instrument in ancient Egypt. The bowed harps known from Ancient Egypt from the same period (Egyptian in general bīnꞏt, b.nt, bent, benet, Coptic voina) can be roughly divided into four groups according to their chronological order and their shape. These include shovel, ladle, naviform (boat-like), and arch or crescent.

The bowed harp was first used in the Old Kingdom, in the 4th dynasty (2723–2563 B.C.) and appears in the feast scenes of the mastabas of Saqqara and Giza. This type of harp is reminiscent of a modern spade: its small, flat, pointed body is joined by a slightly curved, stout, long neck, like a spade blade. The "spade-shaped" bowed harp was initially the only type of harp, but it was made in several sizes, with the number of strings between 4 and 6. Towards the end of the Egyptian Middle Kingdom, it disappears from iconography, and then reappears during the New Kingdom.

Older way to classify
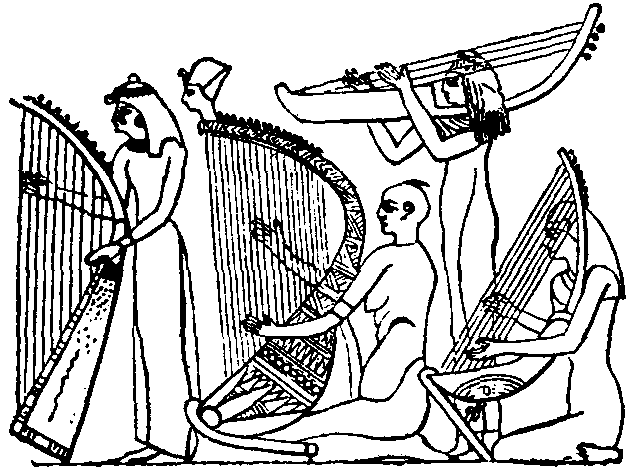
One earlier way to classify these instruments focused on the way they were held and played. However, different kinds of instruments can be held the same way. (Left to right):
1. Standharfe, harp played standing
2. Stützharfe, stool supported
3. shoulder harp
4. Stützharfe, stool supported
Today, 1 and 3 are naviform harps, for the way the soundboxes resemble boats. 2 is a crescent or arch-shaped harp. 4 is a ladle harp, resembling a spoon.

Already in the Middle Kingdom (ca. 2160–1633 BC), a new type of "ladle-shaped" harp appeared . A small, "ship-shaped" harp also became popular in the New Kingdom, gradually increasing in size over time, and eventually sometimes reaching the height of the human body. A special type of harp of this era is the "seven-shaped" vertical bowed harp, the neck of which bends in a narrow arc and then continues horizontally, straight, in a manner reminiscent of the number 7. During the Hellenistic period (332–30 BC), "sickle-shaped" bowed harps appeared.

==== Egypt gallery ====
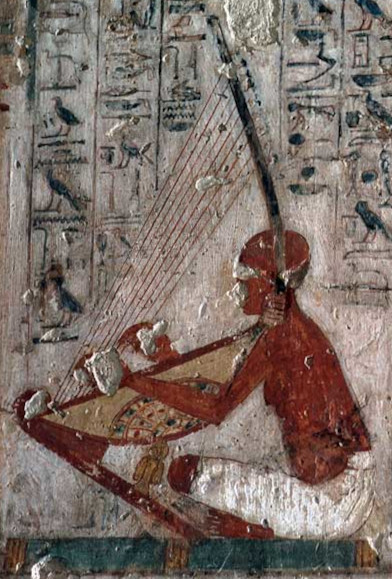
Arched-harp player, from Tomb of Rekhmire. Ladle harp.

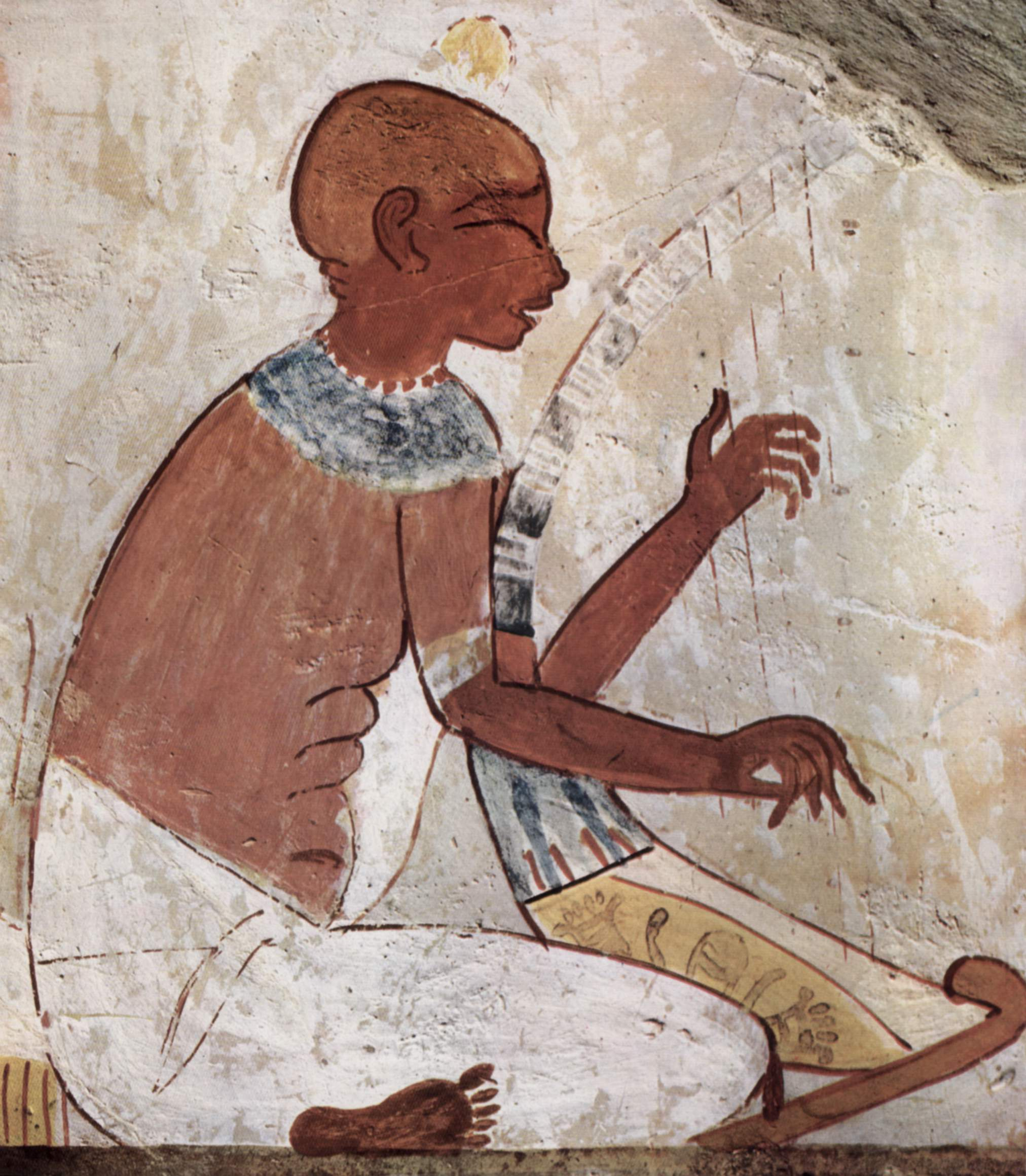
Blind harper in Tomb of Nakht, TT52, 1422-1411 BCE. Ladel-shaped

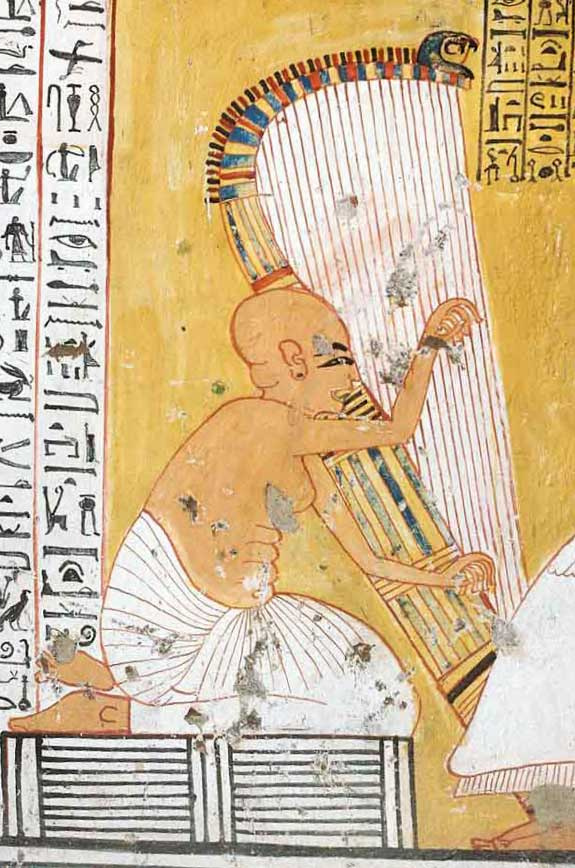
Egyptian harper in Tomb of Ankerkhe, Workmen's Tombs.

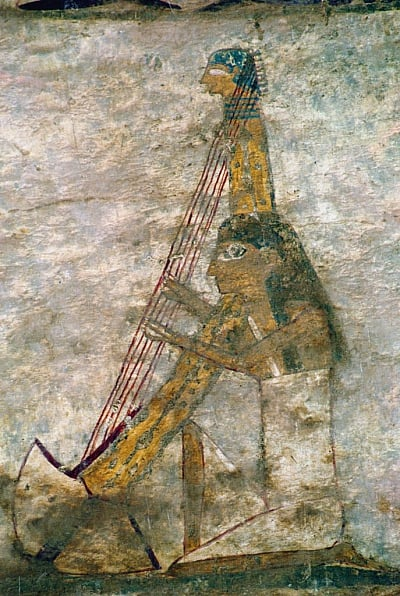
Shovel harp. Beni Hasan area tomb painting. 2040 BC -1782 B.C.

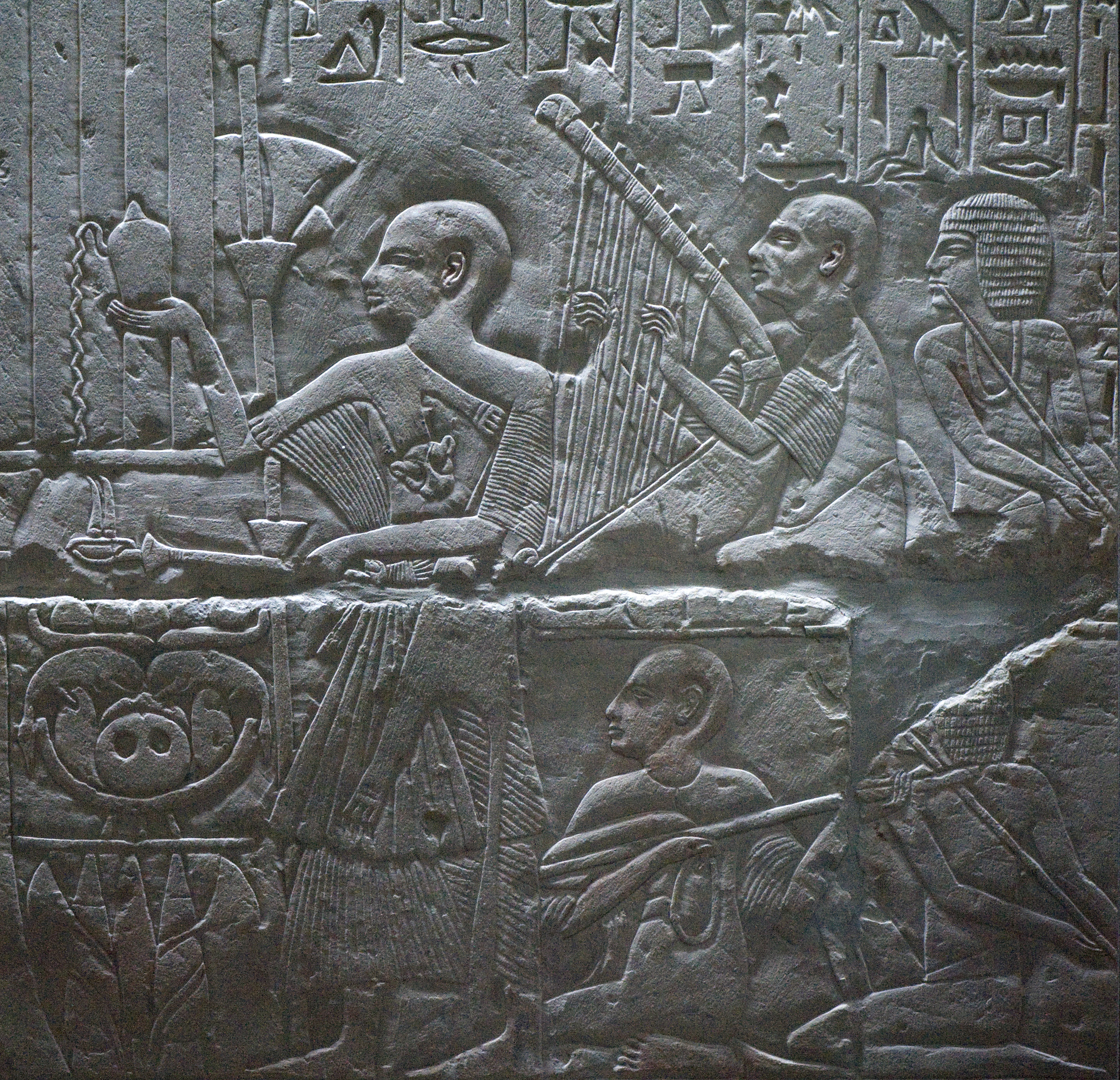
Tomb chapel of Paätenemheb, 1333-1307 B.C.

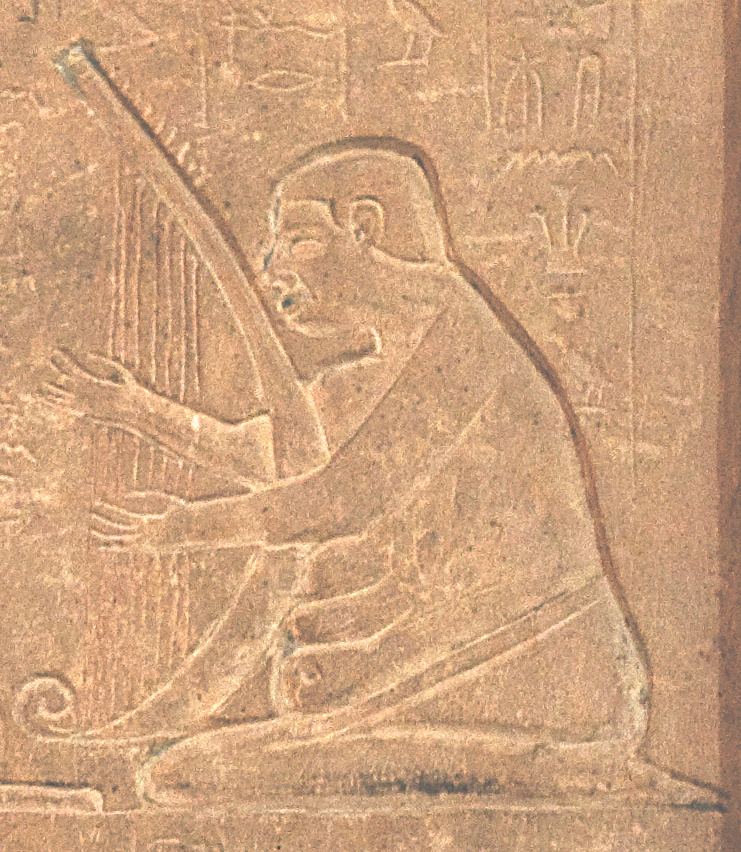
Shovel harp, resembles crescent harps from about 1500 years later. Stela of the Overseer of Priests Iki, 1981-1802 B.C.

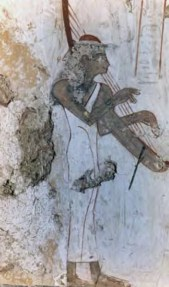
Naviform harp. Shoulder harp. Tomb of Nebamun, TT17.

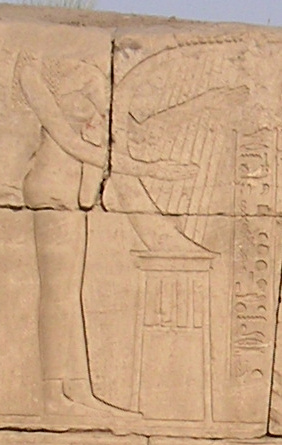
Crescent harp, circa 246-222 B.C.

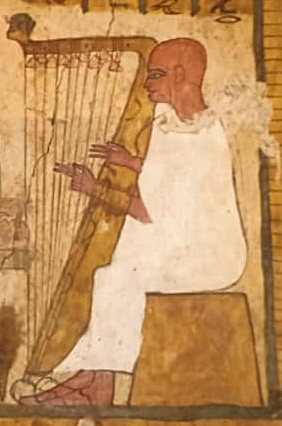
Crooked harp or 7-shaped harp, 25th dynasty

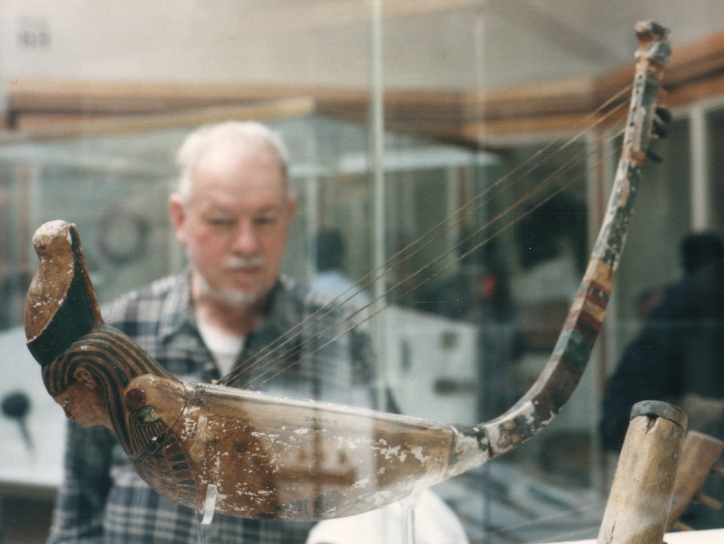
Ancient Egyptian naviform arched harp on display in some UK museum. New Kingdom era, Tomb of Ani (Thebes).

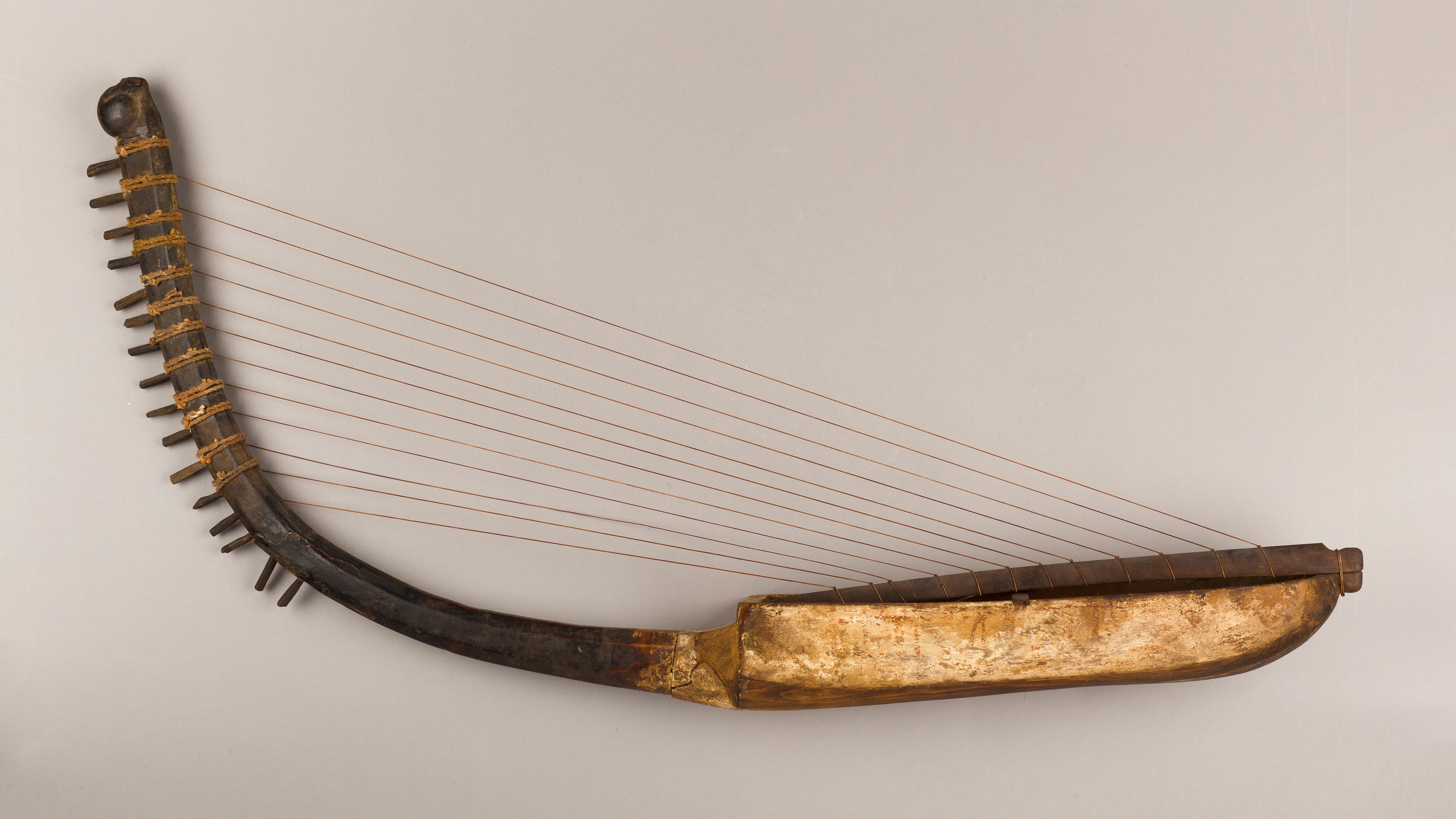
Shoulder harp, arched harp. circa 1390 –1295 B.C. New Kingdom, 18th Dynasty

==== Egyptian hieroglyphs ====
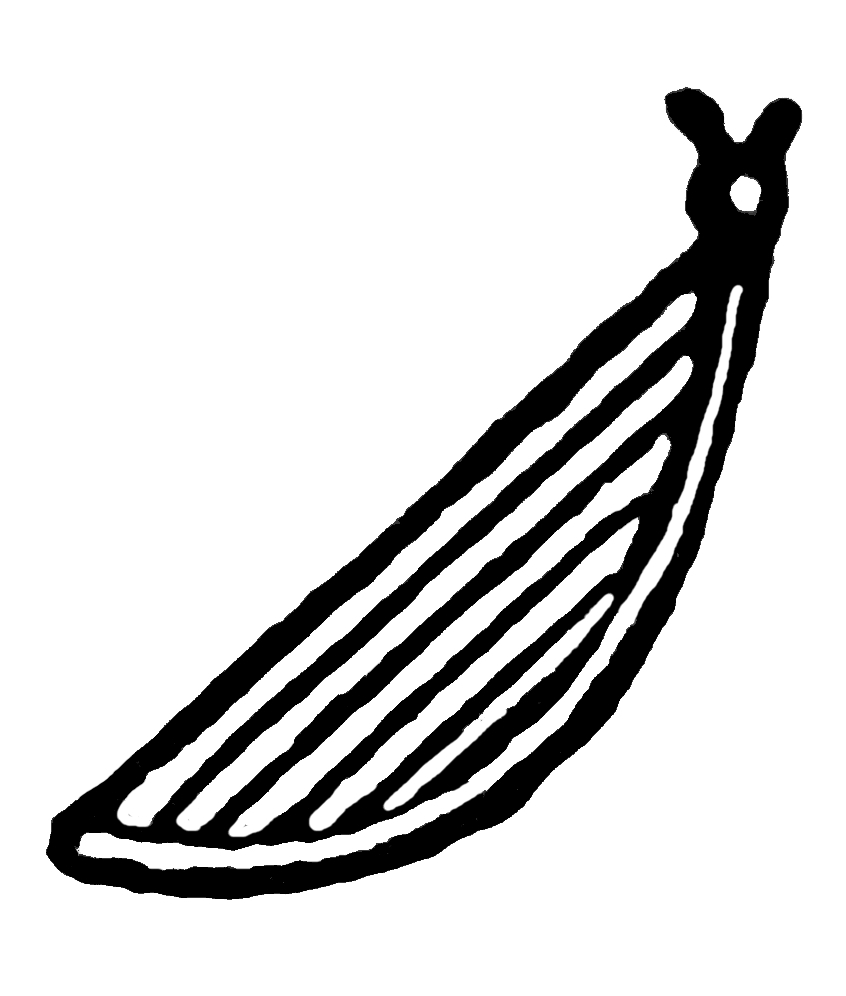

=== Greece and Rome ===
Greek and Roman arched harps

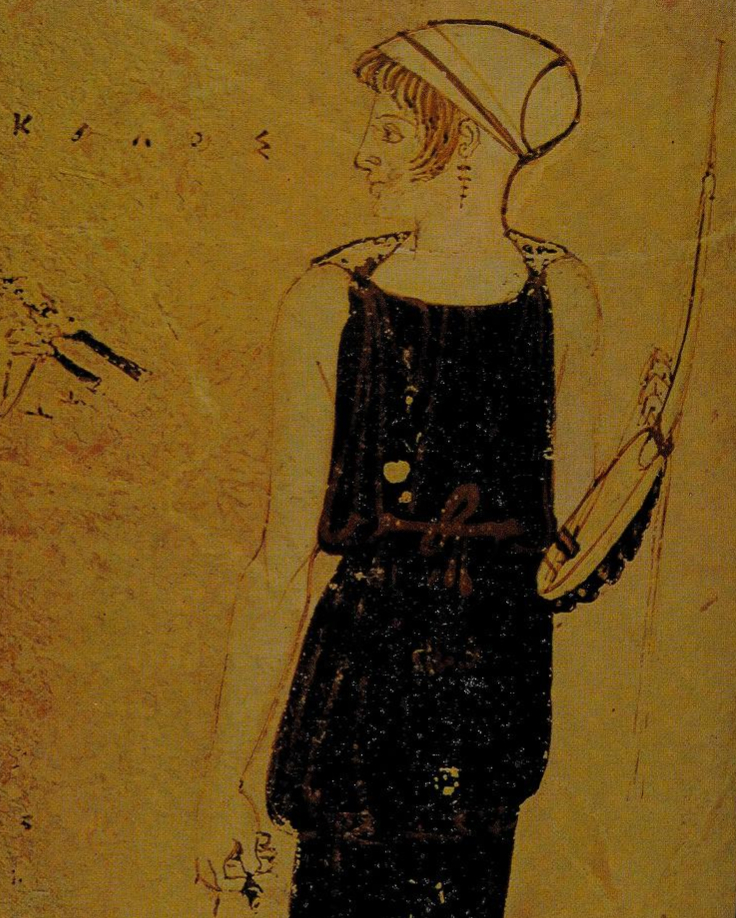
A Greek bow harp from the 5th century B.C. Possible sambuca.

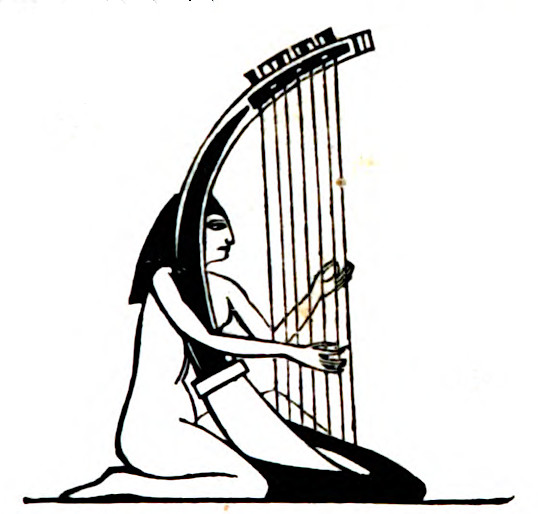
Engraving showing Egyptian vertical arched harp

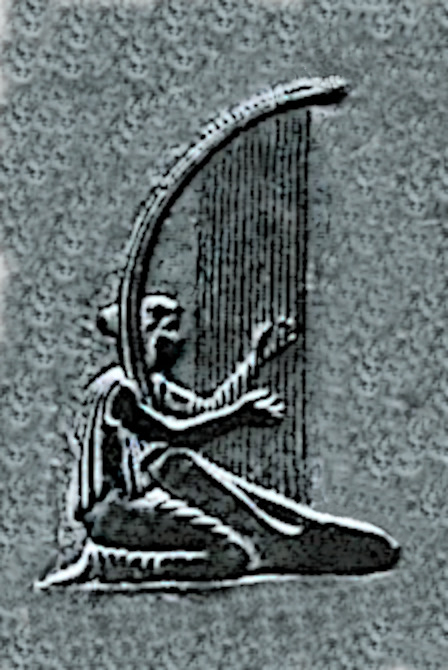
Greek vertical bow harp, circa 5th century BCE.

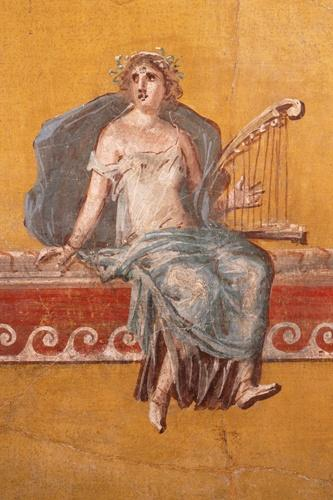
Arched harp, Pompeii, 1st century A.D.

The cithara was the main stringed instrument of ancient Greece, and other stringed instruments were known there, including the pandura lute. Although preferring the cithara, Greeks possessed both arched and angular harps whose names are known, but which academics cannot match with a specific harp. These include psalterion, pektis, trigonos, magadis, sambuca, and epigonion. Much of the surviving artwork shows angular harps. However the Greeks did use the arched harp too, which passed to Greece and Rome from Egypt. Recovered artwork has revealed at least two pictured arched harps. A relief sculpture in the National Archaeological Museum in Athens, dating back to the 5th century B.C., shows a scene of musicians dressed in Greek fashion playing musical instruments, including a large vertical bowed harp similar to harps played in Egypt. Also, a vase painting shows a woman holding a small bowed harp, similar to the enanga harp used in Africa today. This last may be a sambuca, because (being small) it would have the high, effeminate tone that the sambuca was said to have.

Harps were played by women in Greece, often hetaira. In the literature of the 4th century BC and later, the term sambukistria, meaning a woman who plays the sambuke, was used for courtesans (as in general, the word psaltria, meaning a female harpist).

The arched harp may have survived in the Roman Empire until at least the 1st century A.D. Excavations at a villa near Pompeii uncovered a frescoe of a young woman playing an arched harp. (see artwork) This artwork may not be reliable as to depicting current events of its day, as Romans copied art from earlier periods.

=== Sub-Saharan Africa ===
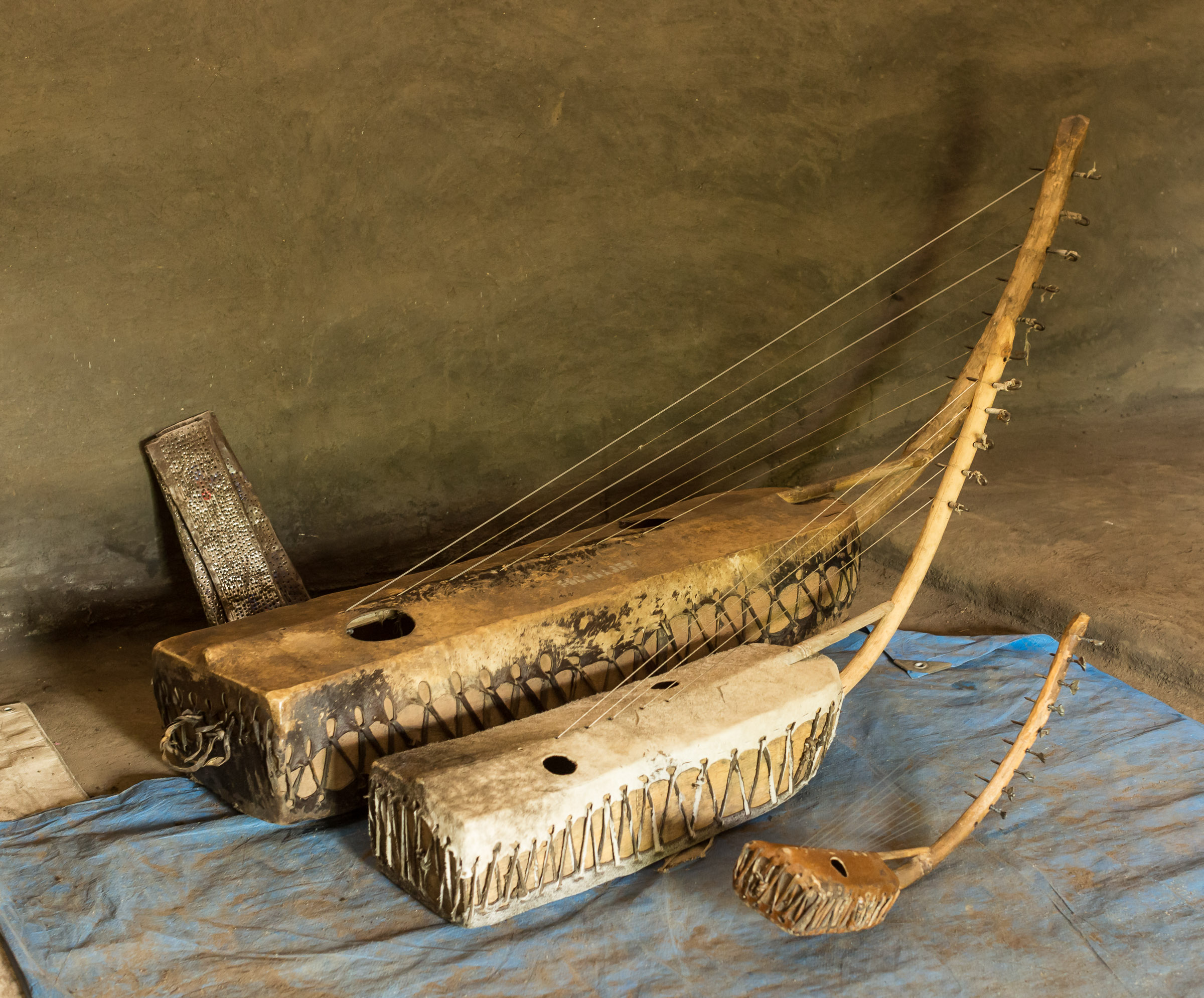
Three arched African harps, adungu, ekidongo, or ennenga. Naviform (boat shaped). The largest is similar to the Egyptian standing harp.

Today, the richest deposits of bowed harps are in sub-Saharan Africa; in 1984, the New Grove Encyclopedia of Musical Instruments listed about 37 entries for African arched harps (as compared to 5 entries for angular harps). They are found mainly in the parts of Central Africa north of the equator, from the western savannas to Uganda, where nearly 50 different cultures use harps. African bowed harps have five to ten strings; it is used standing, lying down, in all possible postures to accompany singing.

While there isn't evidence that directly links Egyptian arched harps to modern African Arched harps, it can be assumed. The assumption is based on the studied survival of another Egyptian musical instrument, the plucked lute, which survives as the gunbri. Ethnomusicologists in the 1960s mapped locations of different types of harp in Africa and arrived at a theory of how they arrived from Egypt and spread across the upper middle part of the continent, below the Sahara.

There is also a connection between Africa and Indonesia which could have introduced the harp, by way of ships sailing the monsoon winds between the two regions. The yam arrived from Indonesia and was grown in a "narrow corridor" called the "yam-belt" in "Kenya, Uganda, North Zaire/South Sudan, the Central African Republic, South Chad to Gabon/Guinea/Cameroon/Nigeria." These are also the areas where the arched harp is used. It isn't certain which direction the harp took on this sea-road, but both Indonesia and Africa used the arched harp.

African bowed harps are very diverse both in construction and decoration, which is often figurative and anthropomorphic. They are identical in that they have a body covered with a leather resonator, which is usually joined by a curved neck made of wood. In most cases, the strings can be tuned with wooden keys fitted to the neck of the instrument. The other end of the strings runs to a longitudinal string support slat, which is located either above or below the leather roof panel, or threaded through it from above and below. The integration of the neck into the body can be done in three ways:

Type 1 sits in the cavity of the body like a spoon in a teacup, held in place only by the tension of the strings. Type 2 is tightly screwed into the tapering end of the body, like a cork in the neck of a bottle. Type 3 is attached to a – often anthropomorphic – extension of the body carved from wood.

African arched harps

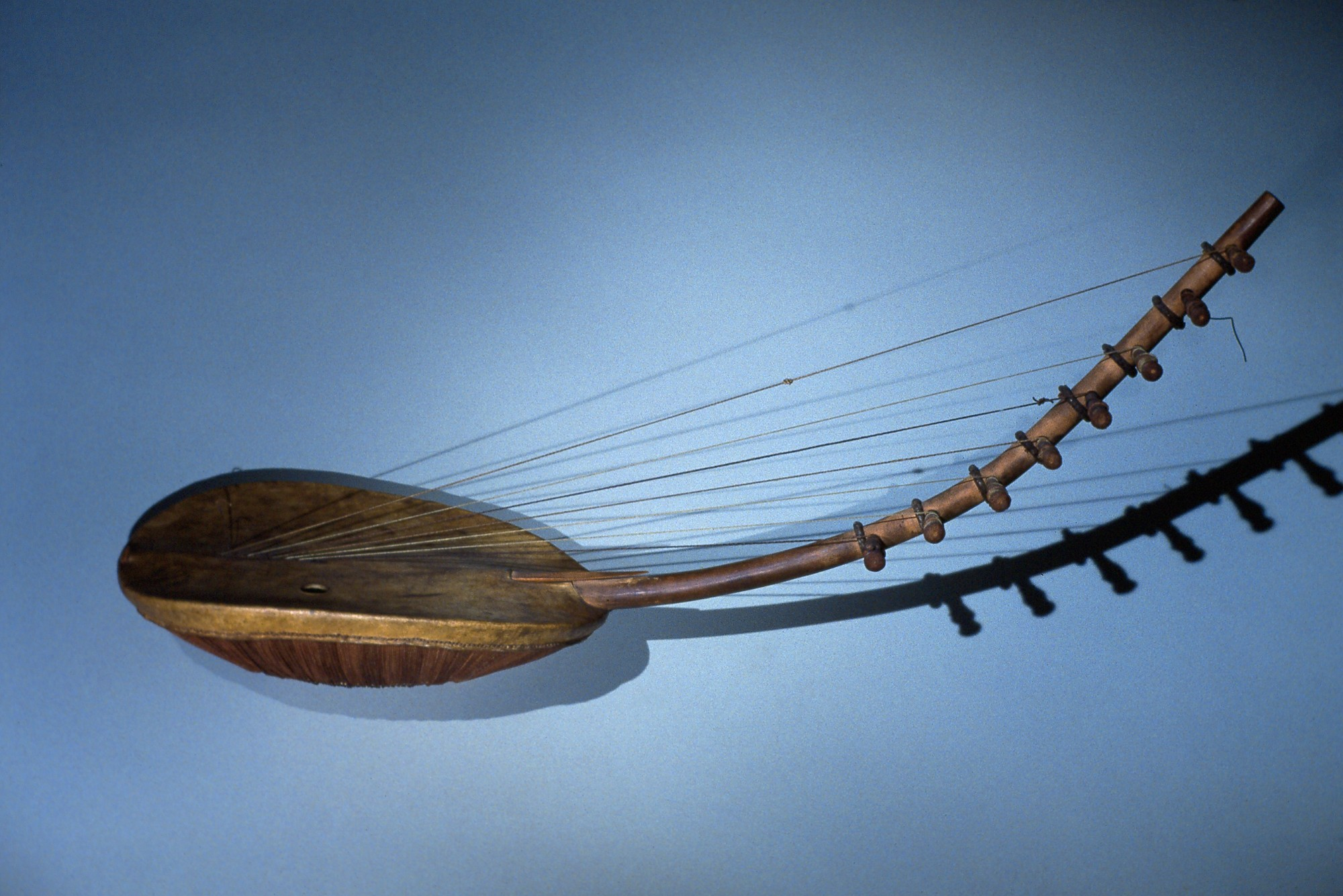
Ennanga, Uganda Type 1. Ladle shaped. The string support is below the leather sound table; it pokes through the table at the neck, wedging into the neck and keeping it from being pulled further by the strings.

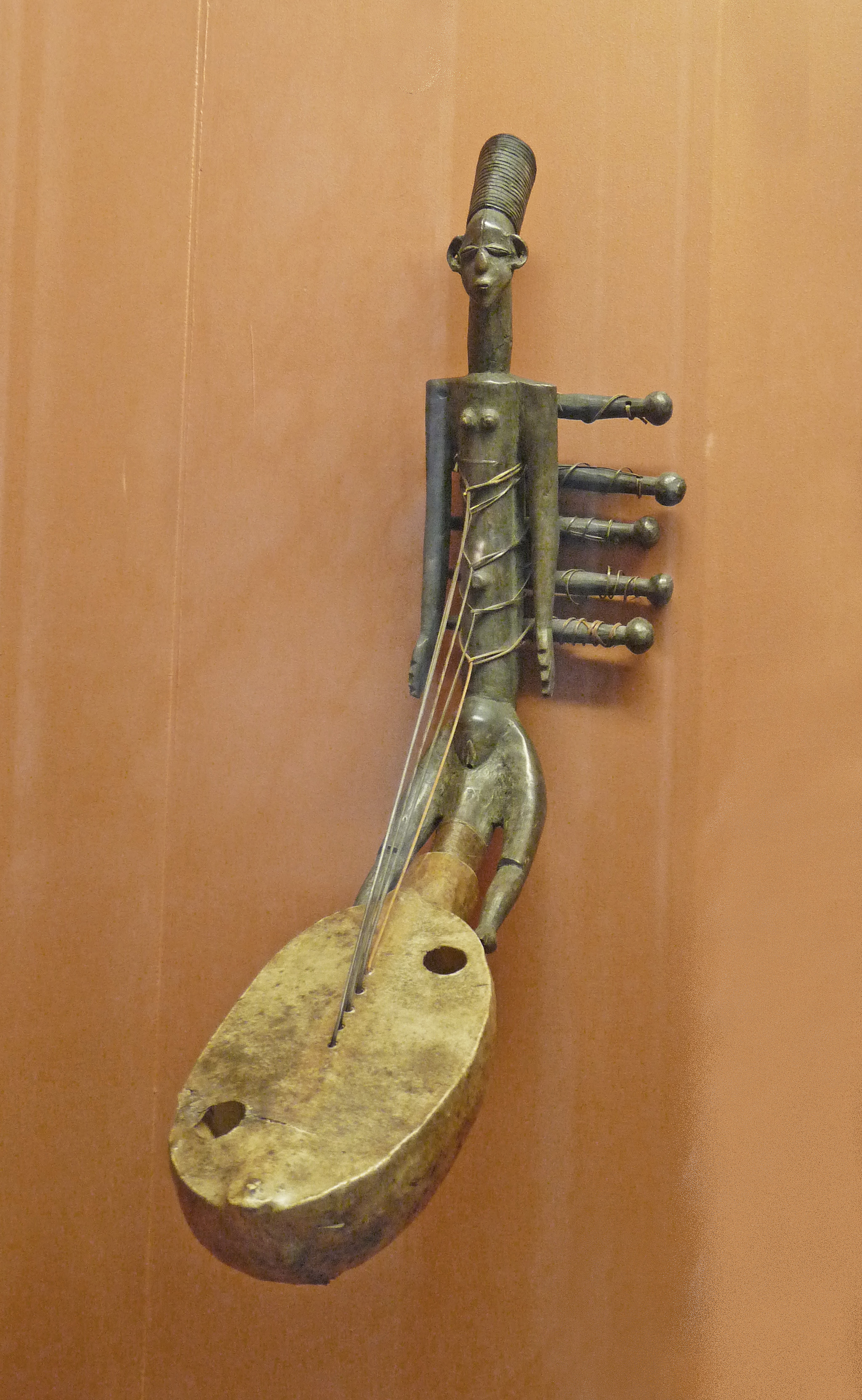
Mangbetu harp, Kundi type 2. Ladle shaped. The string support is below the leather sound table.

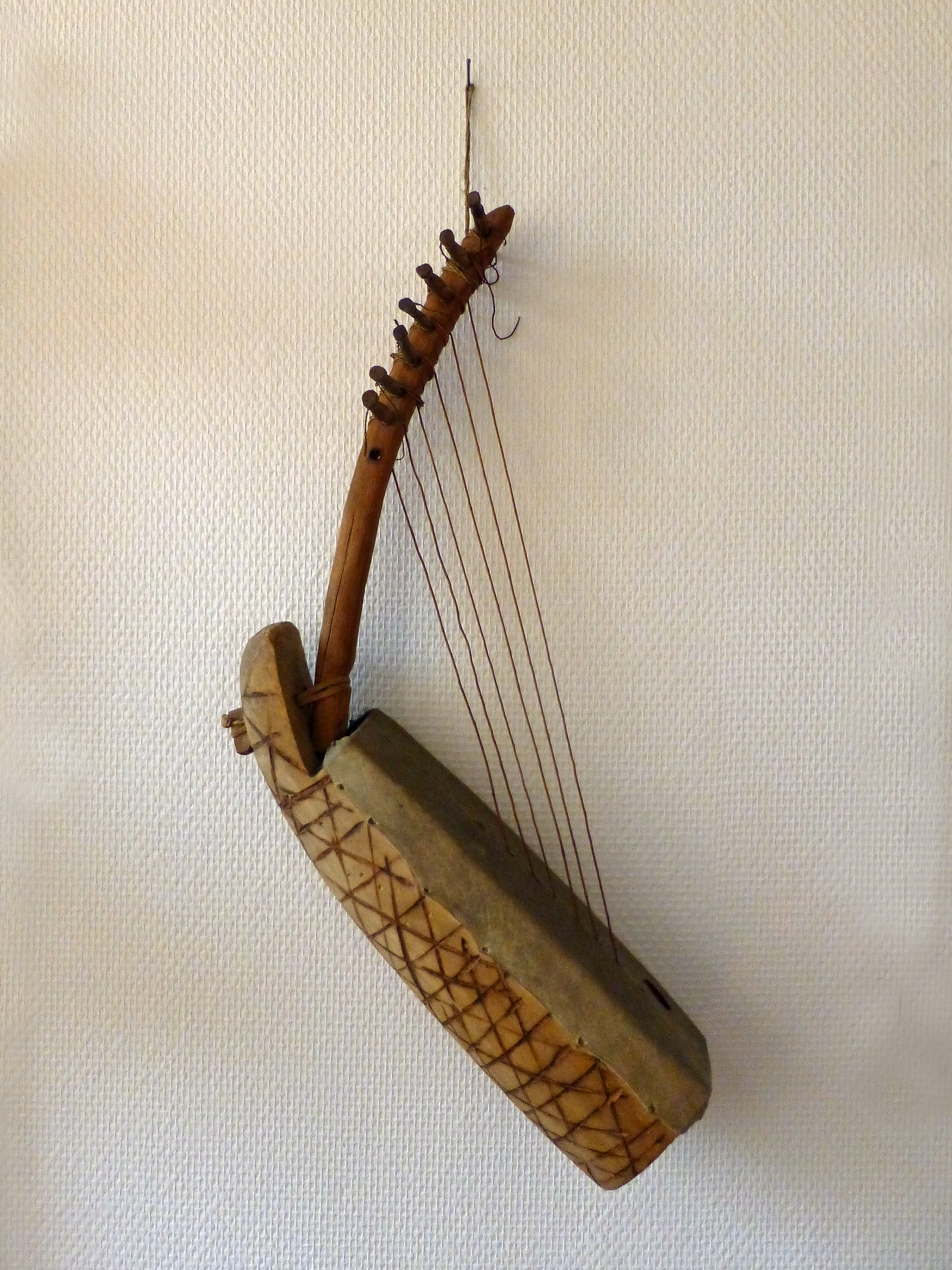
Ngombi, Gabon Type 3. The string support is below the leather sound table.

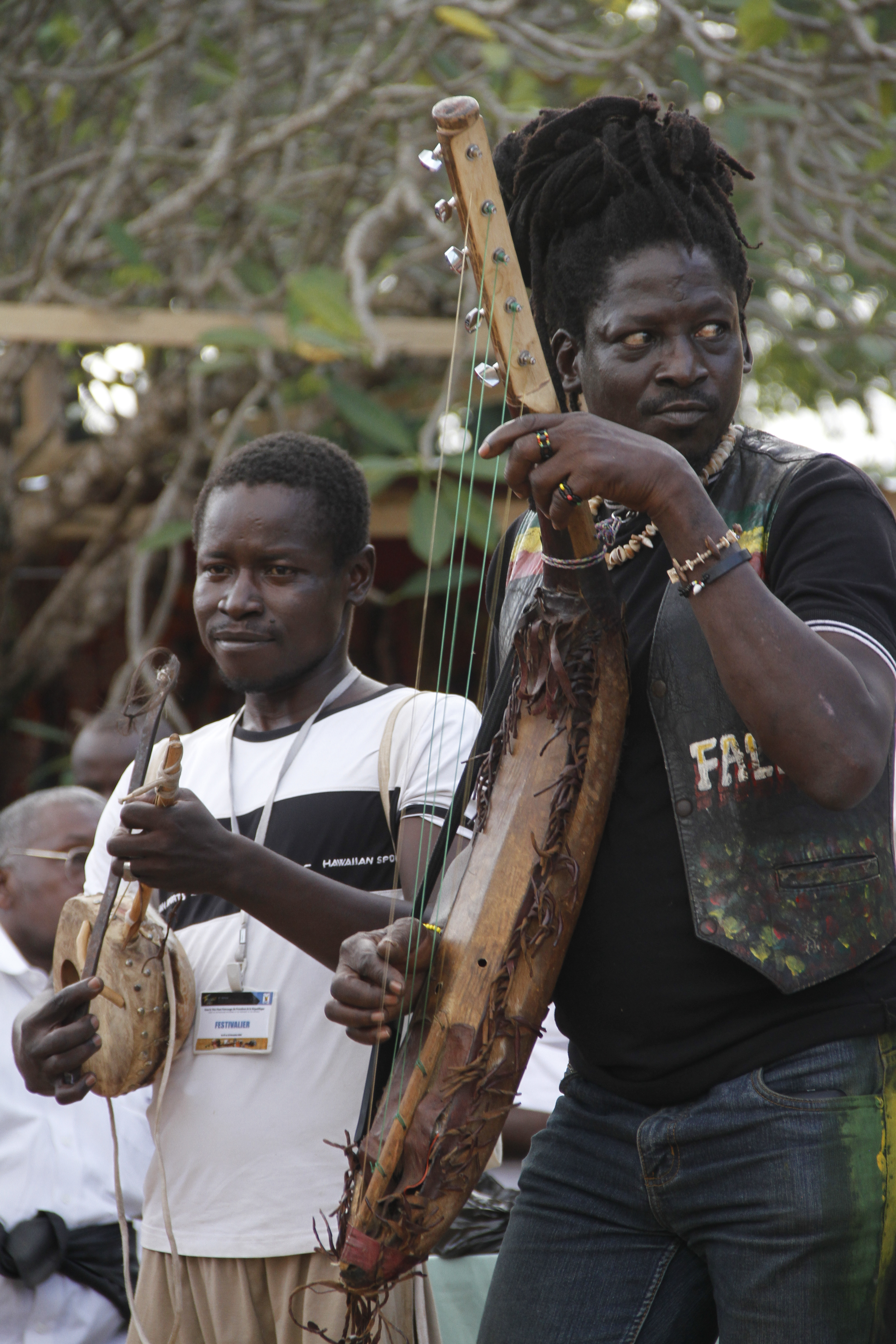
2016, Cameroon. Right, arched harp with modern tuners. Left, possible gúlúm or gurmi lute.

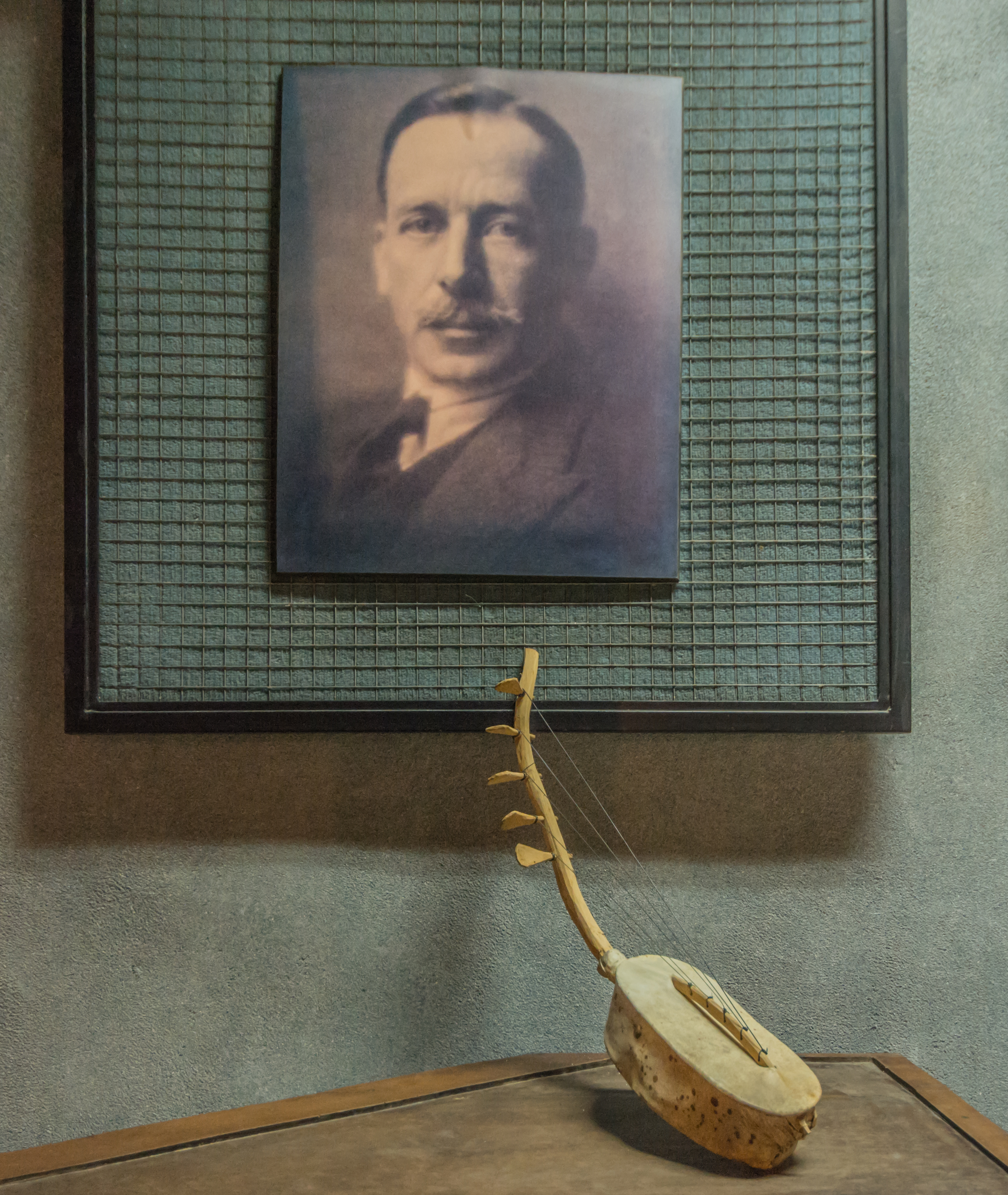
Tunisian harp, type 2. String support visible, poking through skin.

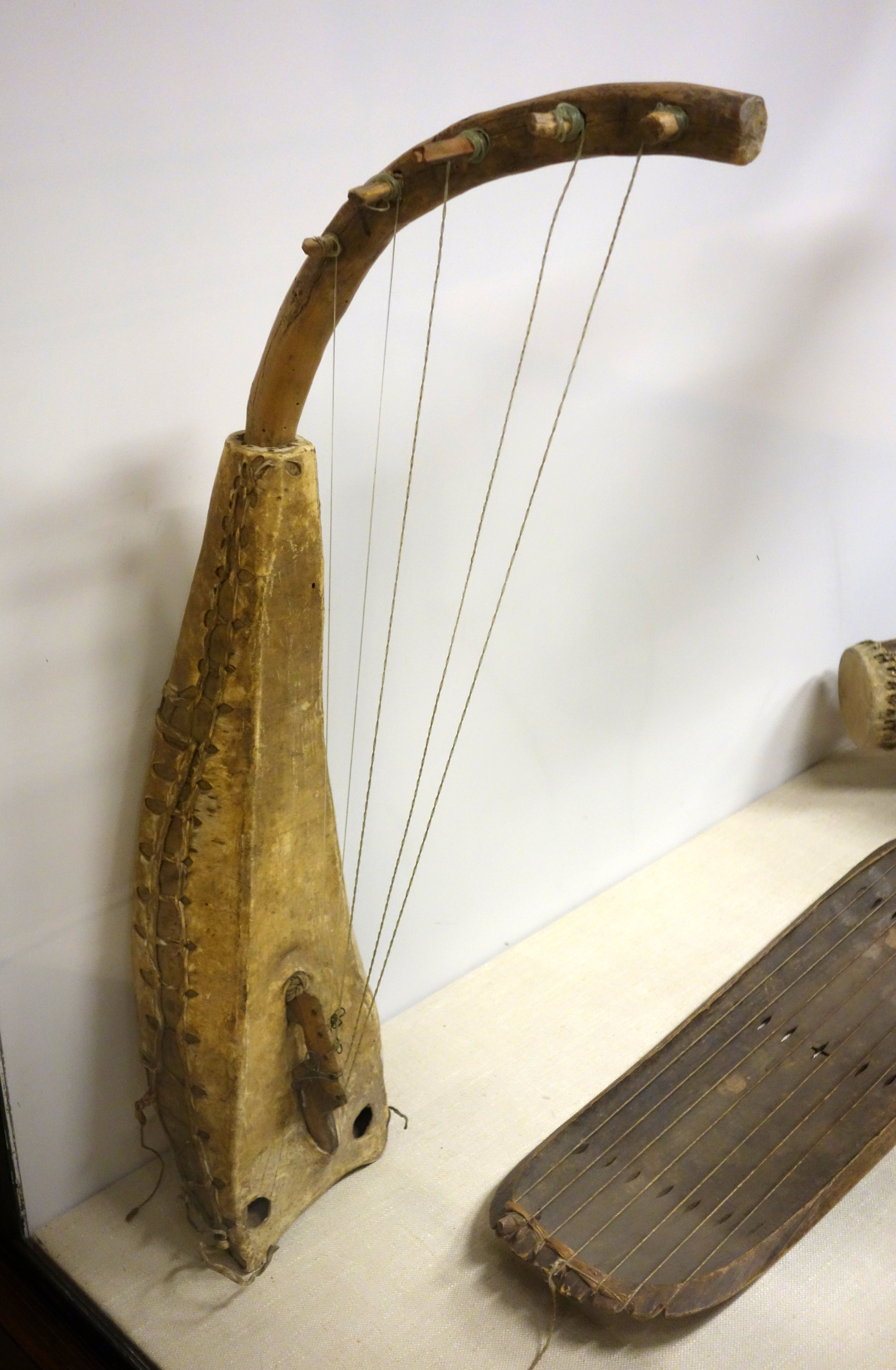
Chad, Masa people, type 2. Dilla. Visible string support.

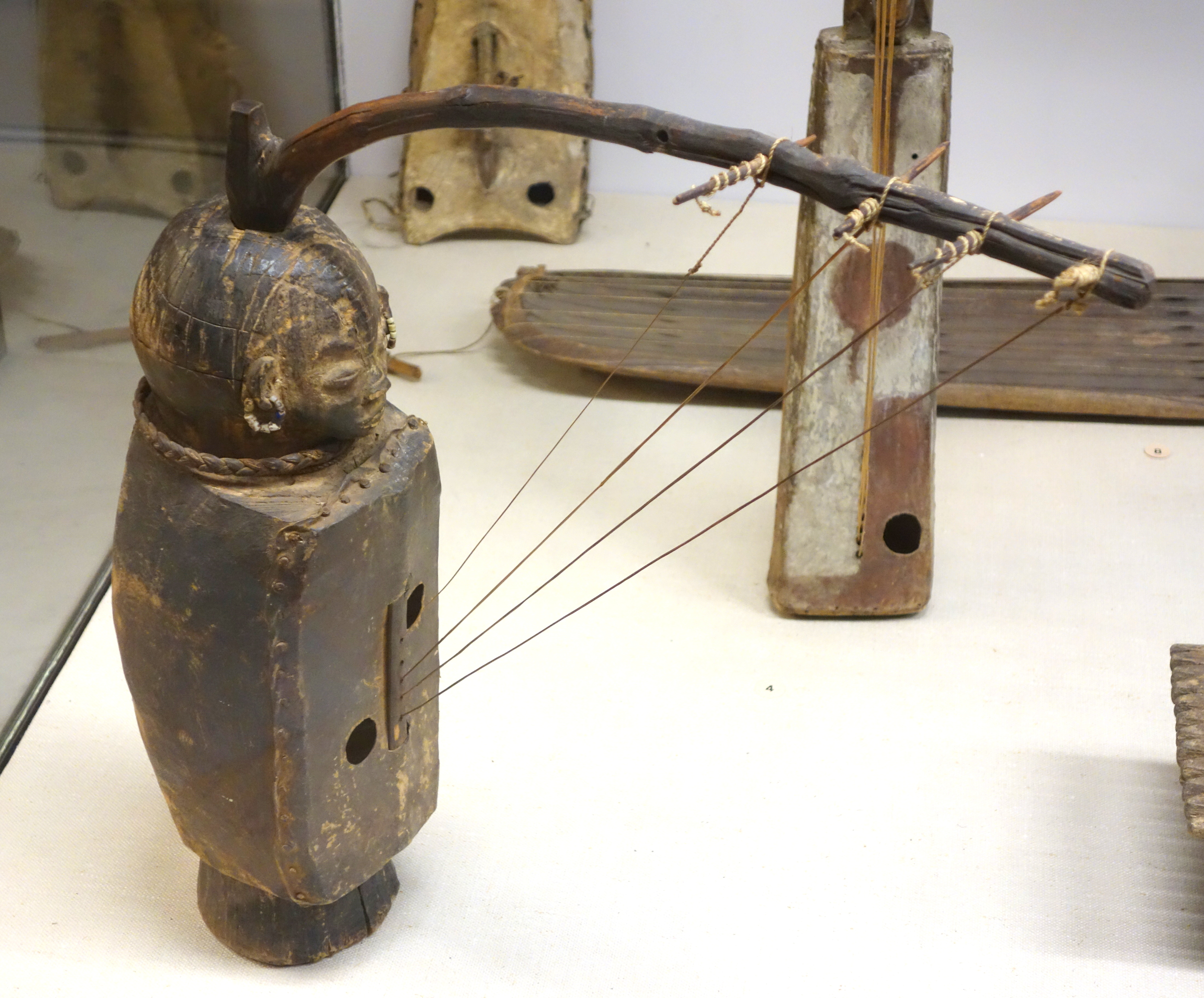
Zaire, Ngbaka people, type 3. Visible string support.

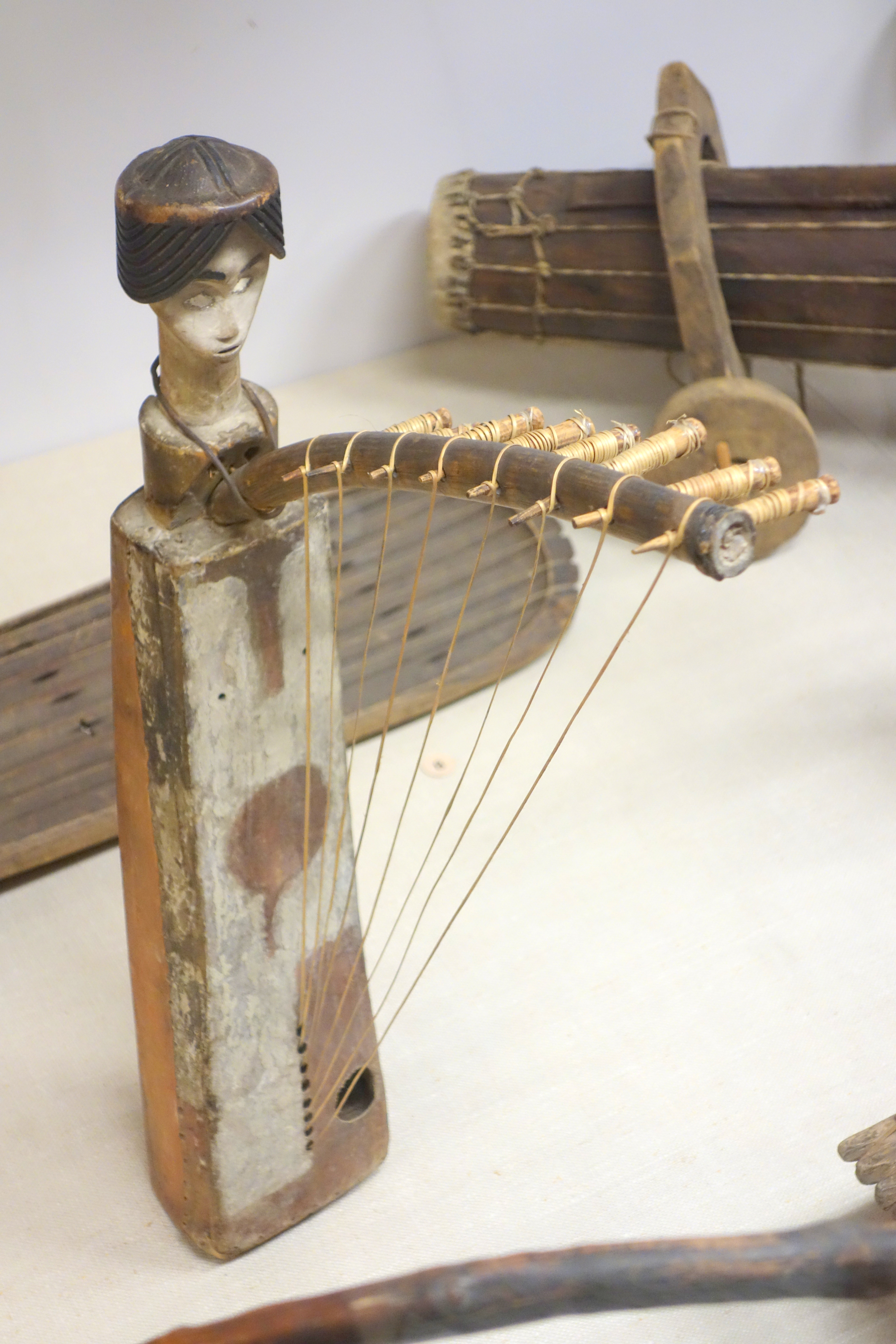
Gabon, Fang people, type 3.

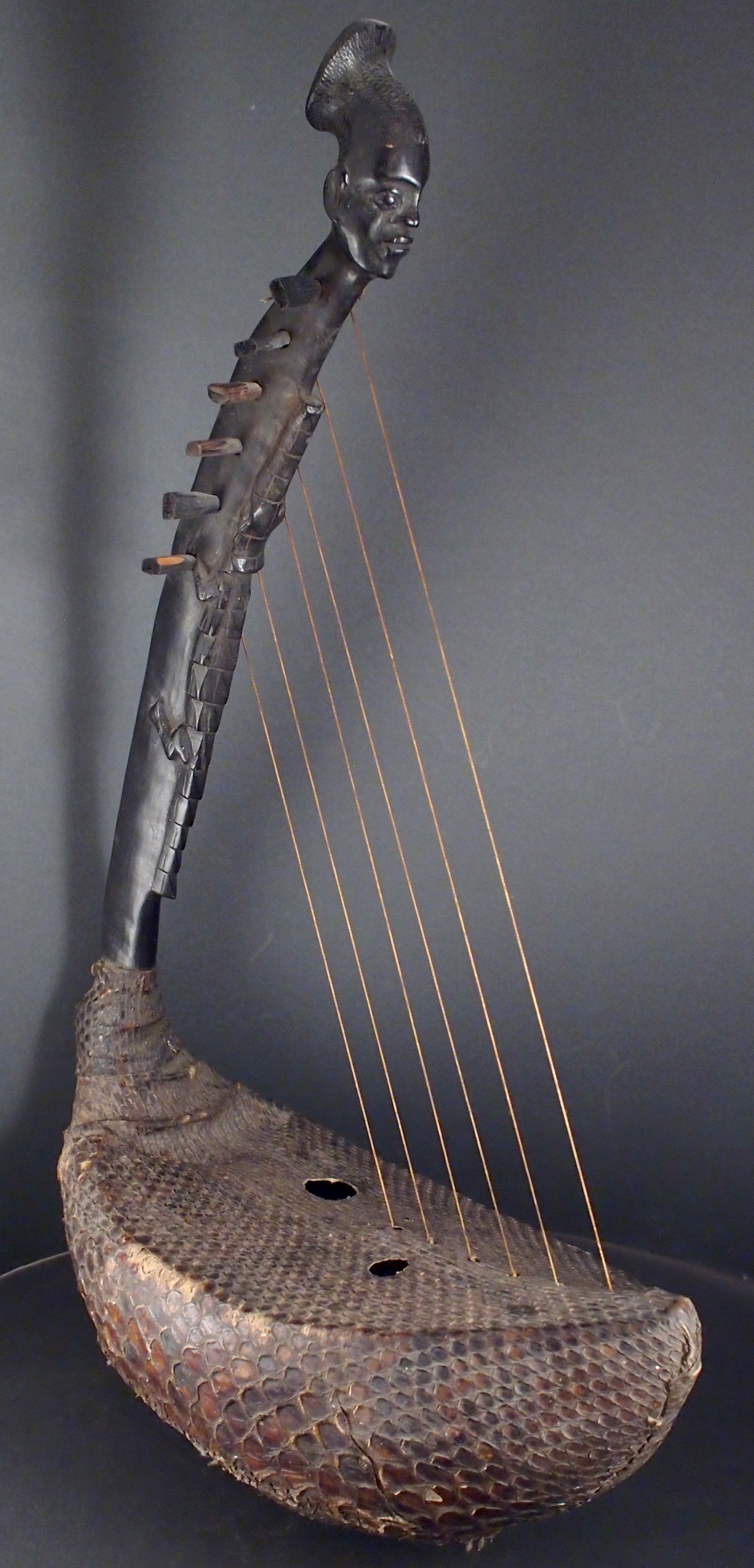
Harp of the Mangbetu people, snakeskin soundboard.
