= African harp =

Plucked string instrument

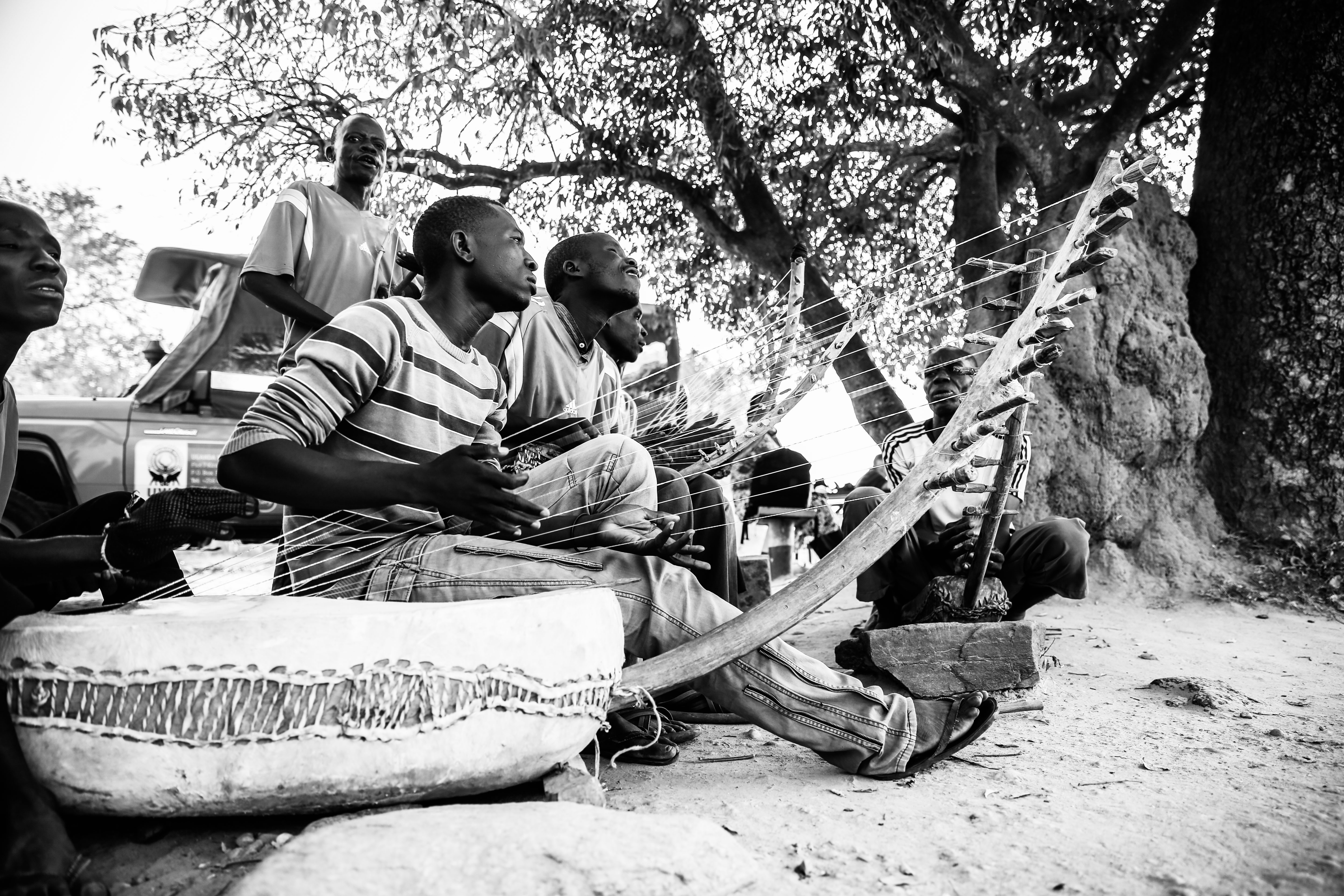
Adungu arched harp.

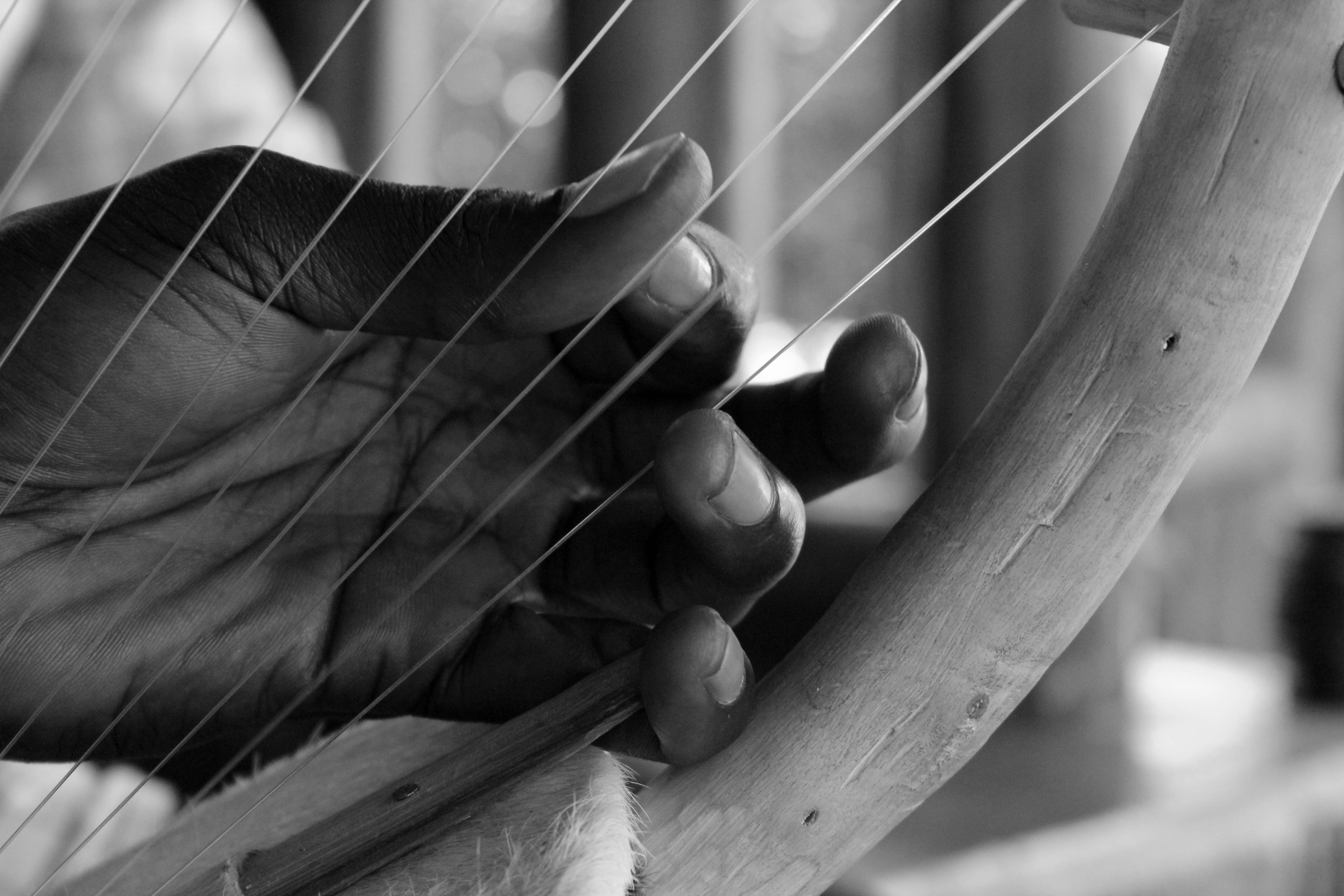
Fingering African arched harp(Adungu)

African harps, particularly arched or "bow" harps, are found in several Sub-Saharan African music traditions, particularly in the north-east. Used from early times in Africa, they resemble the form of harps in ancient Egypt with a vaulted body of wood, parchment faced, and a neck, perpendicular to the resonant face, on which the strings are wound.

== Ancient Egyptian harps ==
The oldest depictions of harps without a forepillar can be seen adjacent to the Near East, in the wall paintings of ancient Egyptian tombs in the Nile Valley, which date from as early as 3000 BCE. These murals show an instrument that closely resembles the hunter's bow, without the pillar that we find in modern harps.

The oldest depictions of harps in Africa date back to the 4th Dynasty of Egypt (around 2500 BC). They represent the already fully developed type of bowed harp with a short spade or shovel-shaped resonance box, which presumably dates back to the 1st dynasty (beginning of the 3rd millennium) and is an independent Egyptian development. Curt Sachs (1928) recognizes the musical bow as the starting point in the gently curved arch of the man-high ancient Egyptian harp, whose attached resonating body was adapted to the lower end of the string carrier and from whose ceiling instead of one string several strings now appear in one plane up to the upper area of the support rod.

Towards the end of the Second Intermediate Period (around 1600 BC), new forms of harp appeared, above all the naviforme large bow harp, a head-high standing harp with a long, slender body that only gradually merges into the string carrier. In the Theban tomb TT367, which is dated to the reign of Amenophis II (second half of the 15th century BC), there is also a transportable, smaller, deep-arched harp of the singers (shoulder harp) and, for the first time, a small angular harp. The latter supplanted the ancient Egyptian bowed harps, which continued to exist at best in folk music or in surrounding areas. The Egyptian angular harp later made its way to West Africa, where it survived in the form of the Mauritanian ardin. The angular harp also appears further south, such as the angular harp used by the Efe people of the Democratic Republic of Congo. The portable shoulder harp played in the New Kingdom had a slender boat-shaped body and a strongly curved neck.

According to Klaus Wachsmann's (1964) theory, portable bowed harps gradually made their way from Egypt up the Nile to East Africa and, branching off from this route, also to Central and West Africa. In the south, their range hardly extends beyond the equator. It includes Uganda, the center of African bowed harps. Here, in the middle of the 20th century, 12 of 25 ethnic groups had their own harp tradition. Harps also come from the north and north-east of the Democratic Republic of Congo, Darfur in Sudan, South Sudan, Gabon, the Central African Republic and north Cameroonbefore. In West Africa they are restricted to areas south of Lake Chad. According to the different ways of attaching the truss rod to the body, Wachsmann differentiates between three main types of African bowed harp, which allows conclusions to be drawn about their distribution routes.

Arched-harps

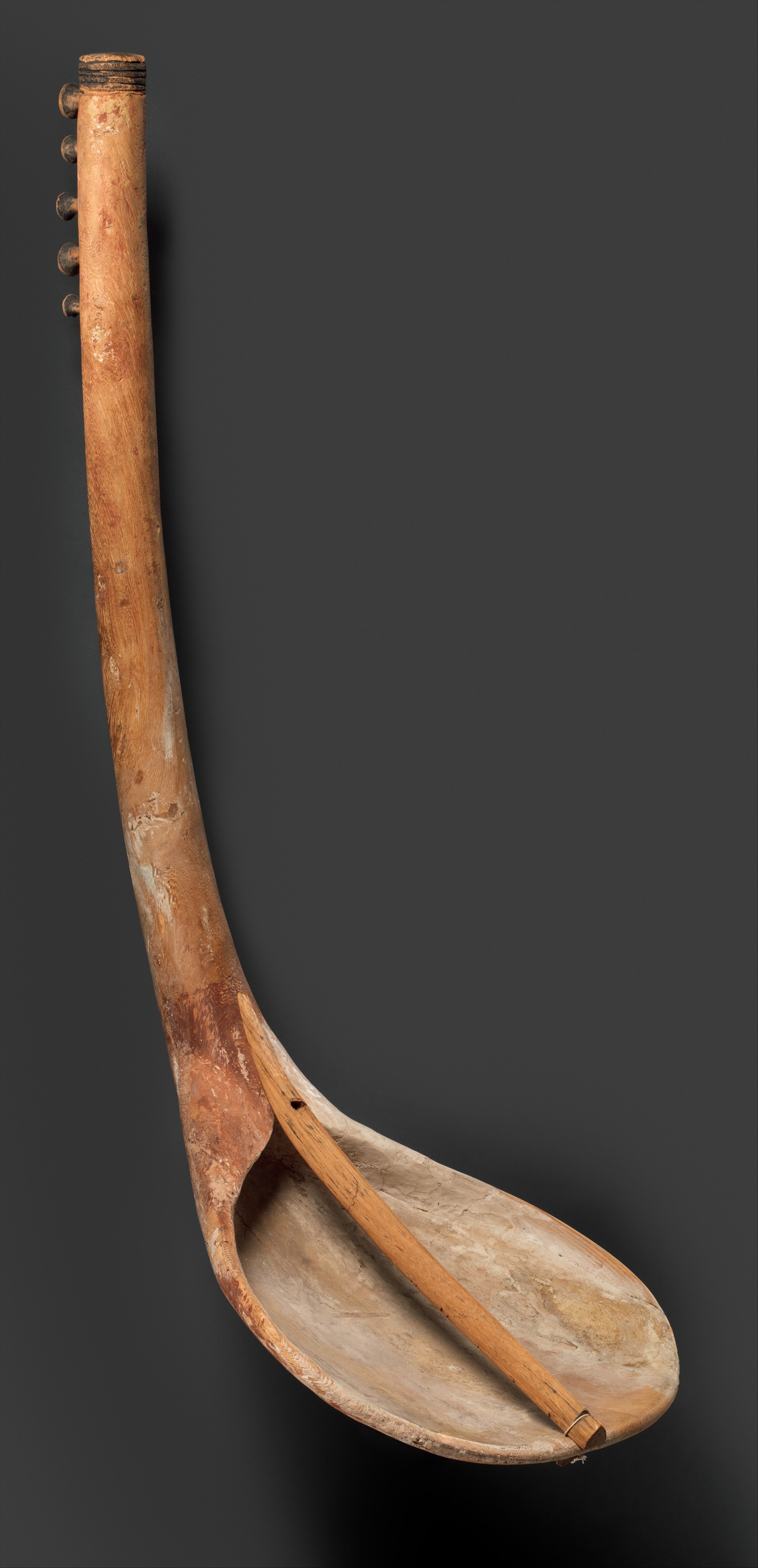
Harp from the Middle Kingdom, with soundboard-skin gone. The wooden bar that the strings were tied to is visible, as are the pegs on the neck.

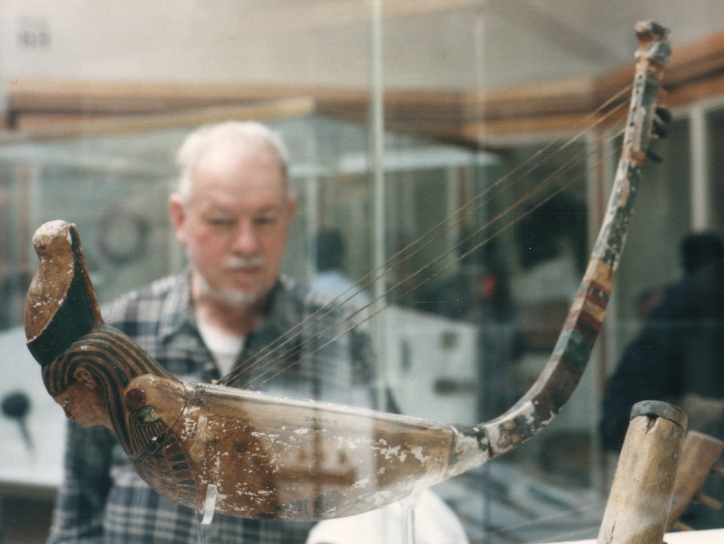
Egyptian harp in the British Museum, from the Tomb of Ani (Thebes). New Kingdom, 18th dynasty.

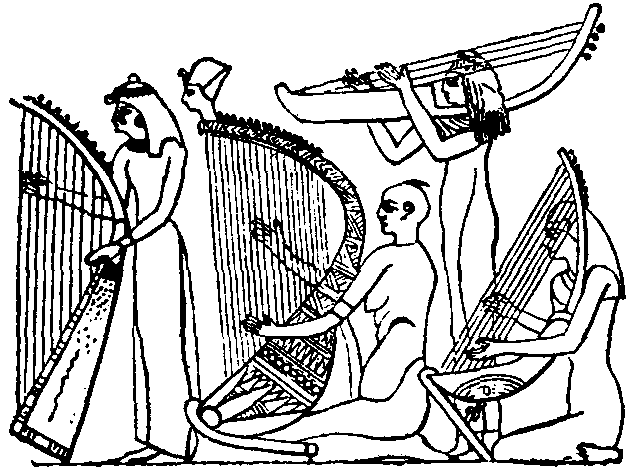
Picture shown variety of Egyptian harps.

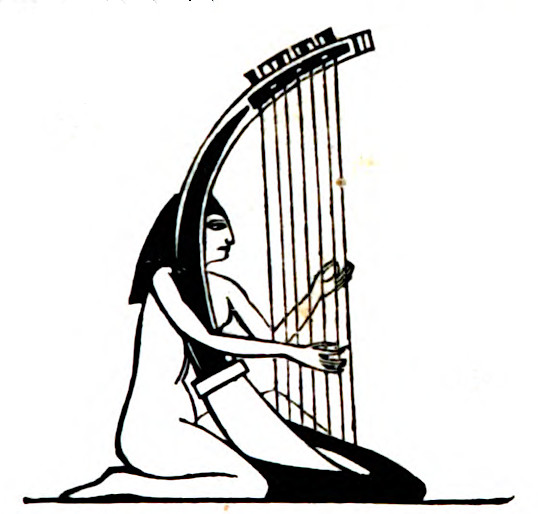
Egyptian vertical harp, kneeling harper

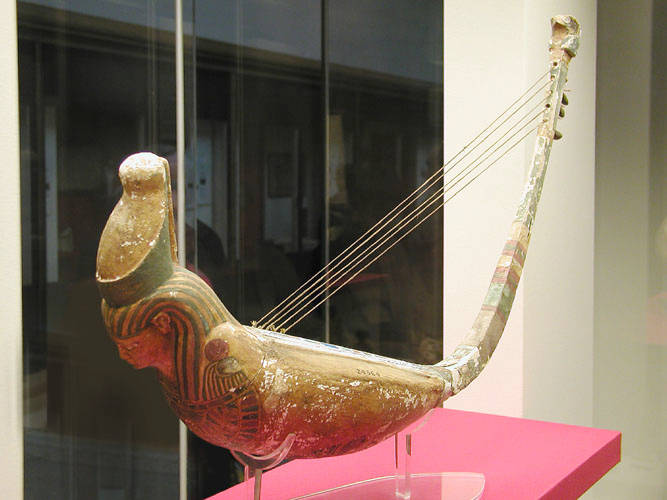
Arched harp, New Kingodom

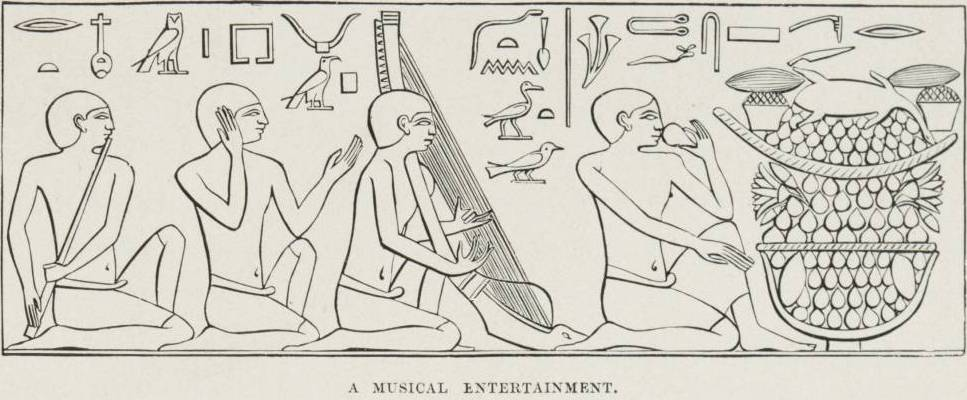
Egyptian spade-shaped harp

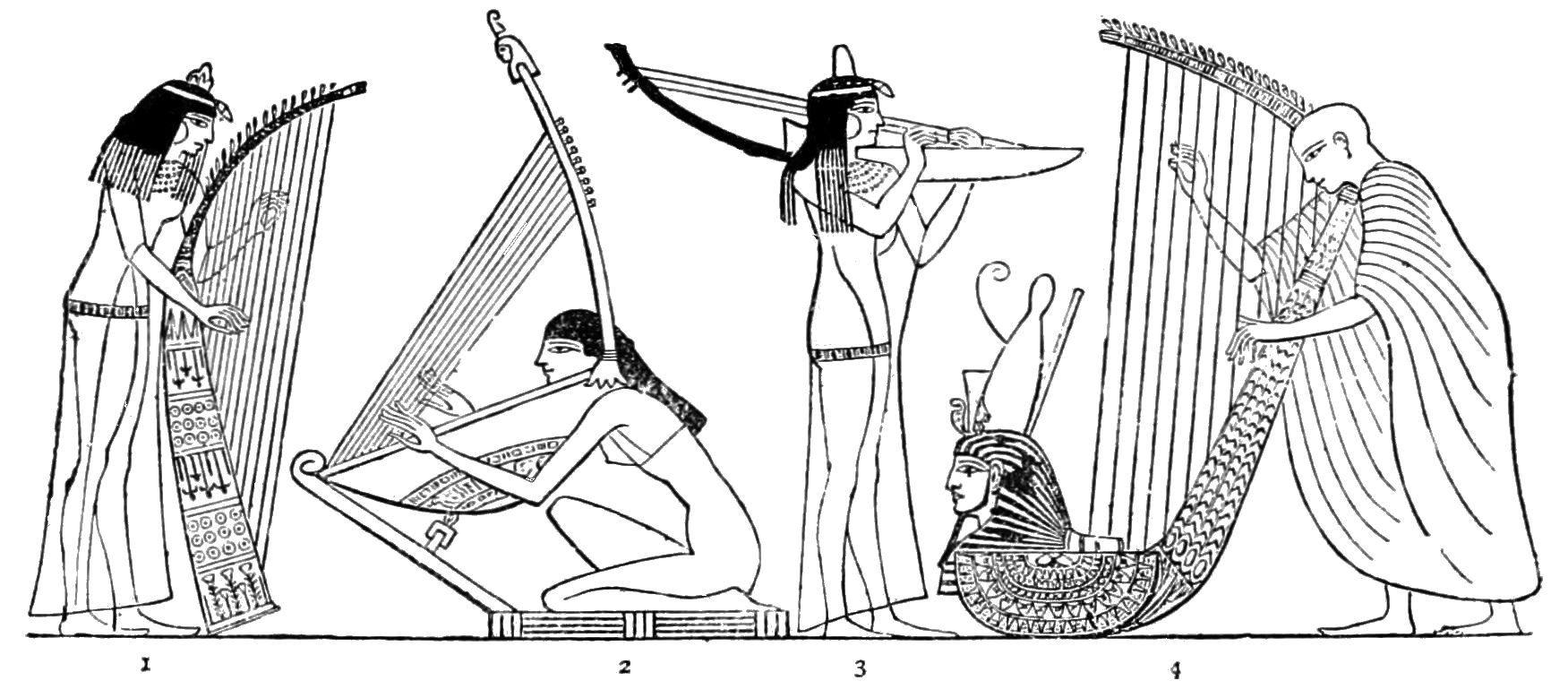
Picture with multiple Egyptian harps

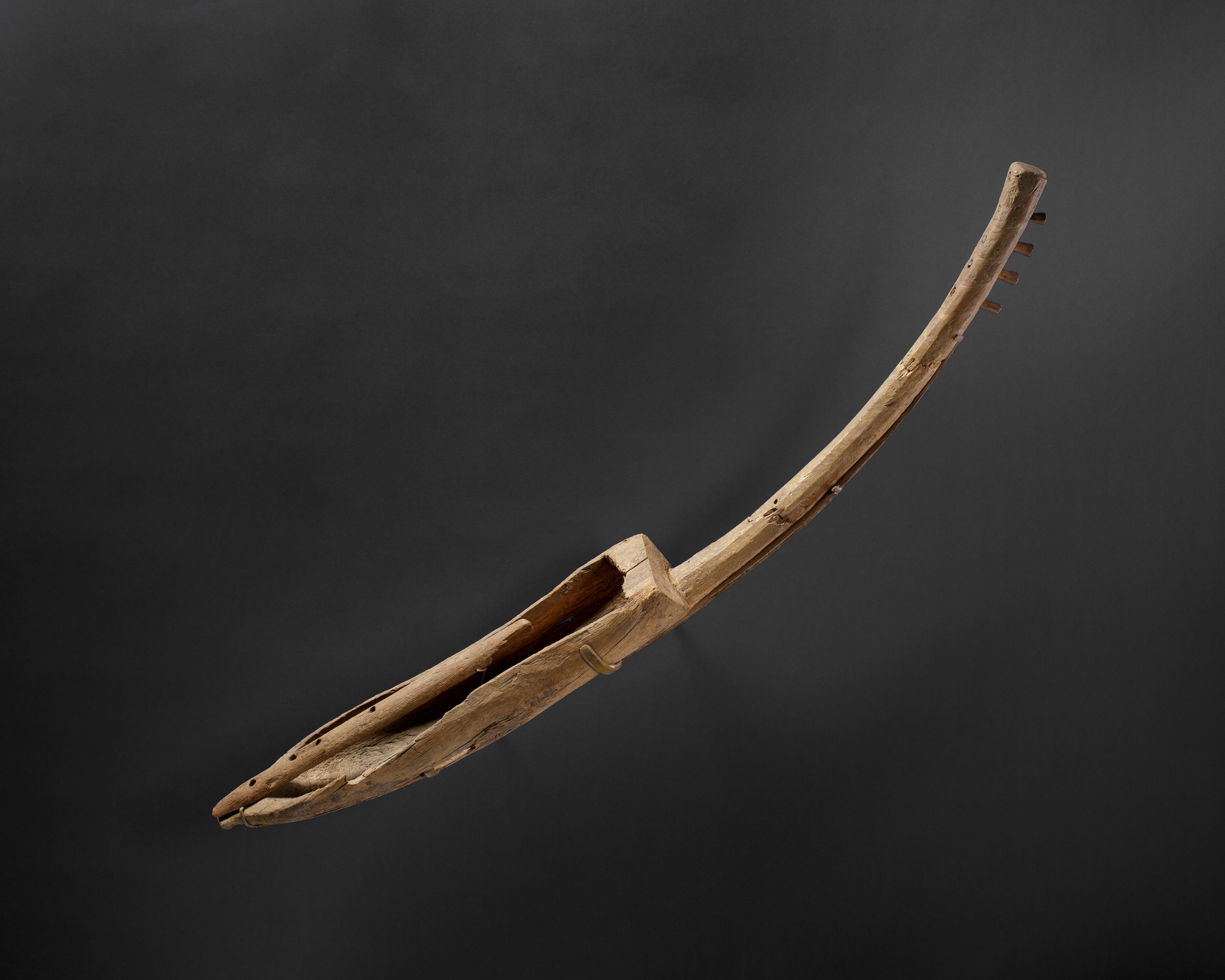
Harp, Late Second Intermediate Period–early New Kingdom, Dynasty 17–18. Naviform harp, shoulder harp.

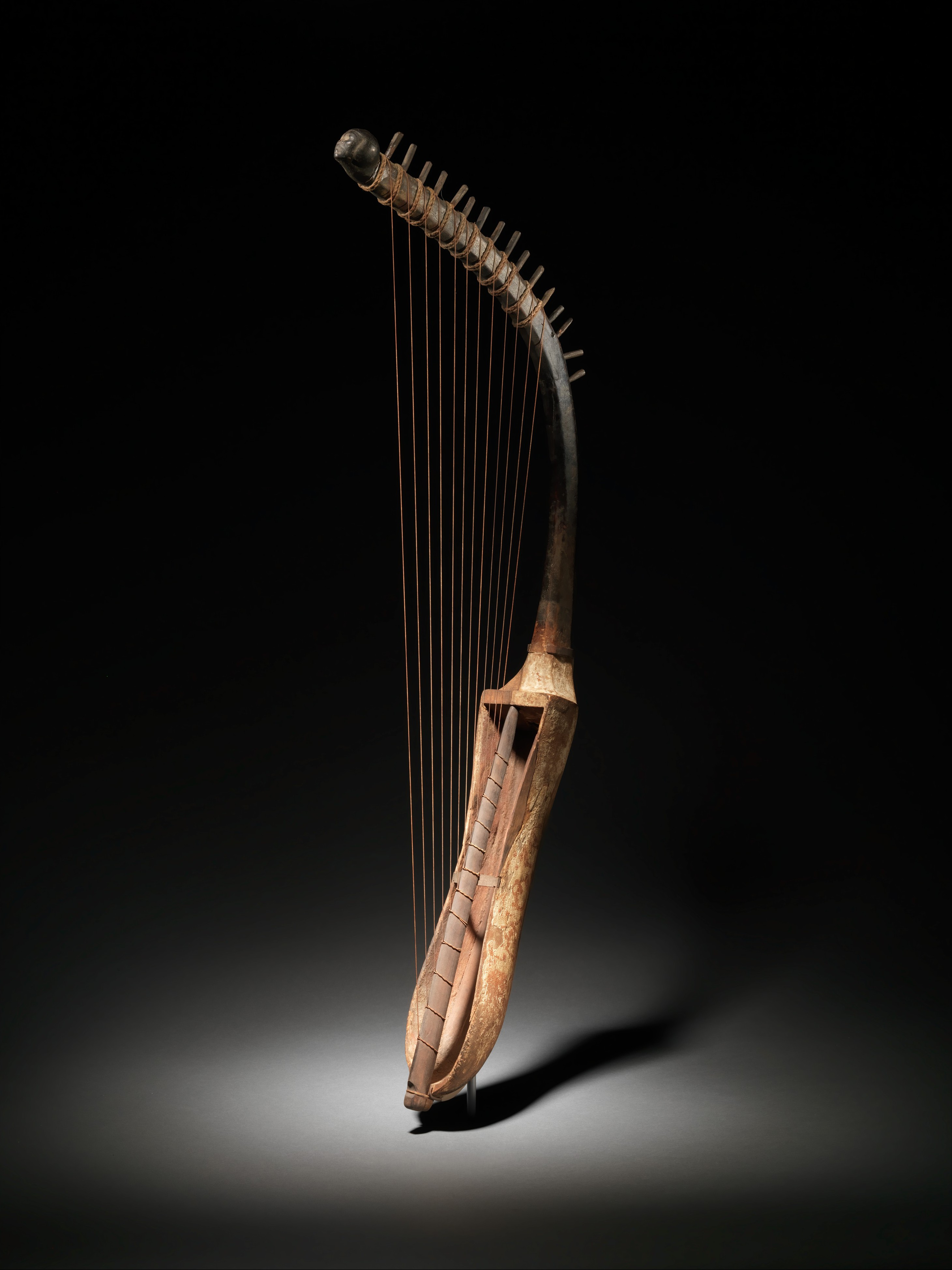
Egyptian harp, New Kingdom, 18th dynasty

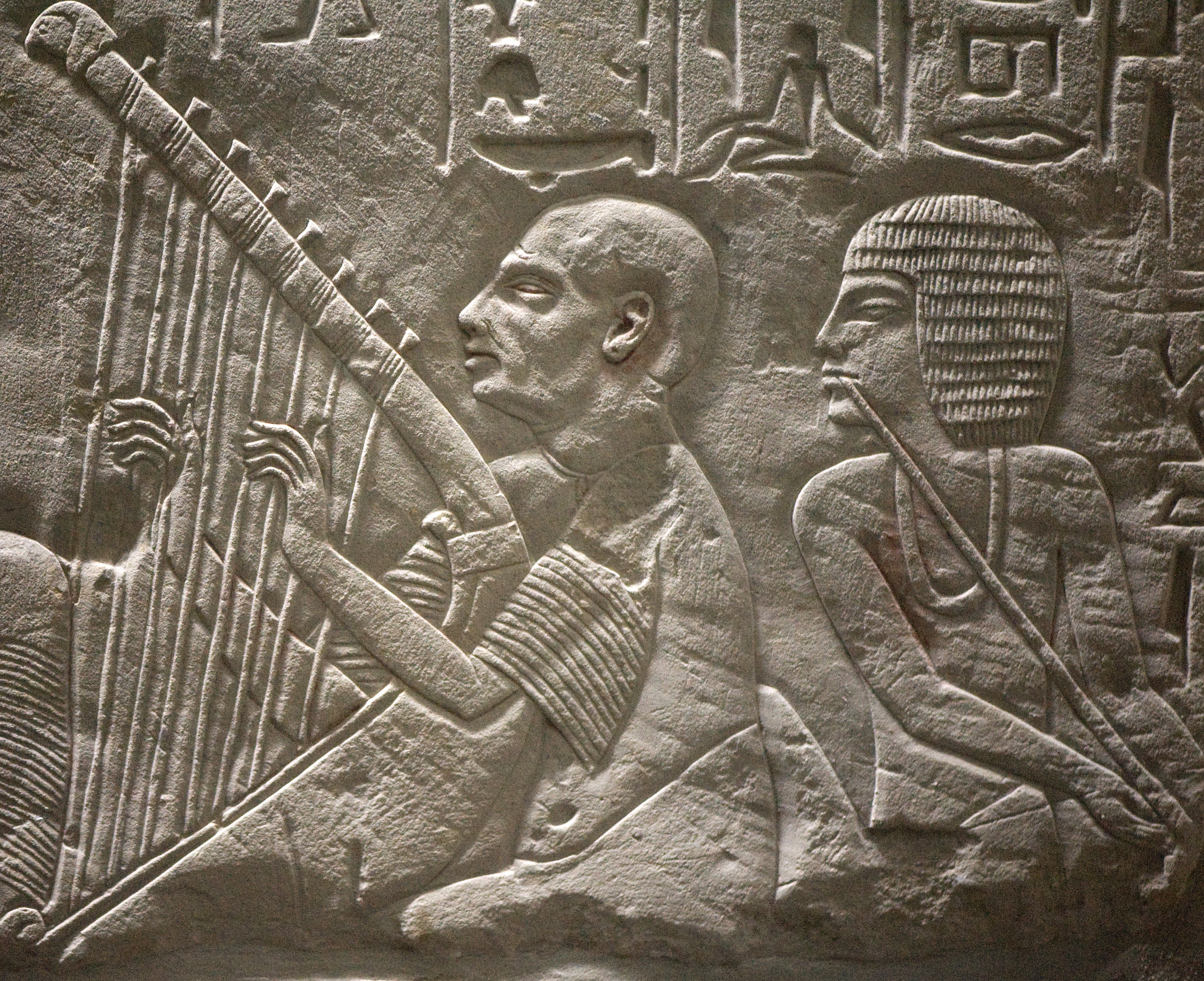
bow harp
Angular-harps

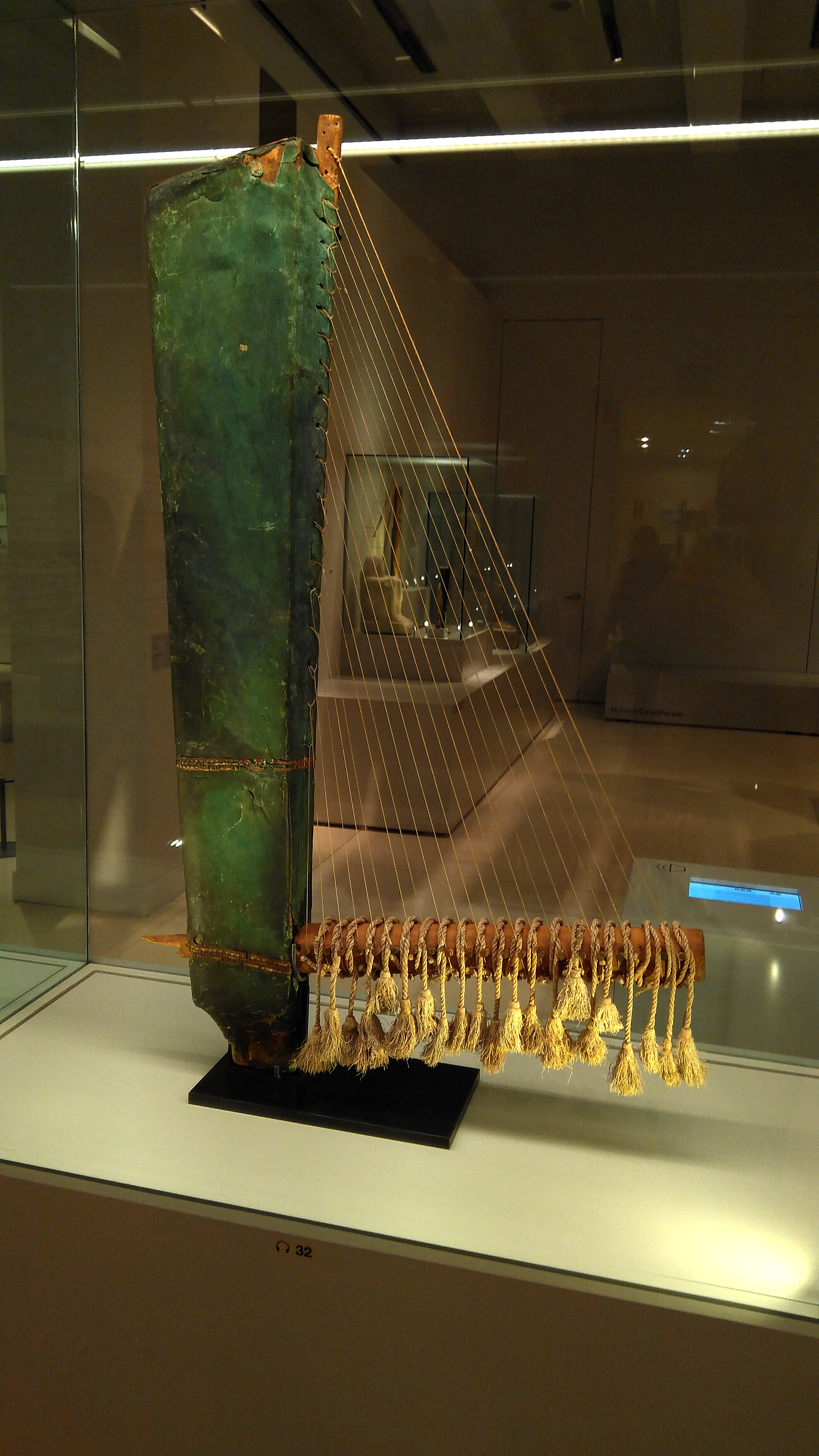
Egyptian angle harp. Angular harp (10th to 8th century BC)

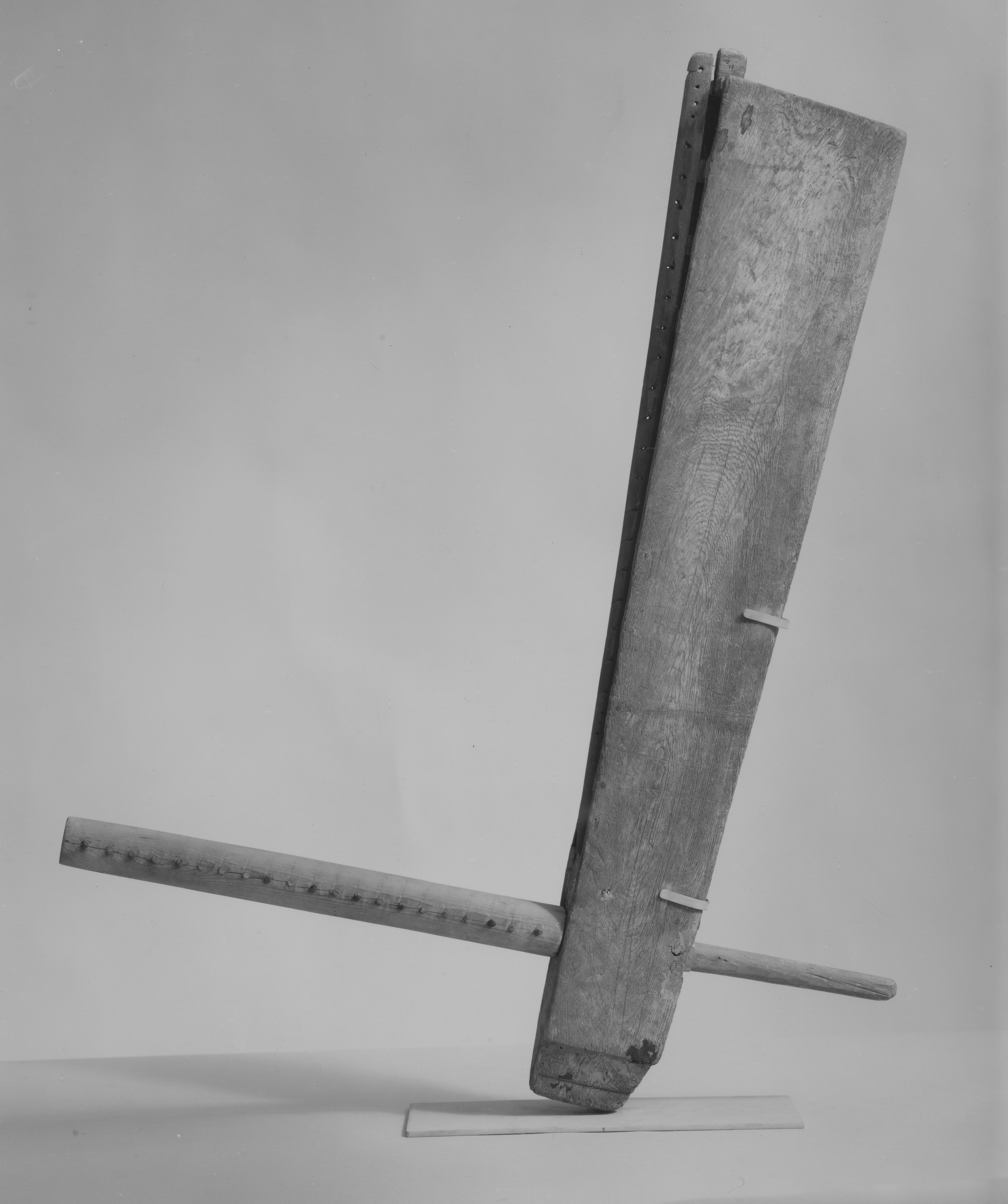
Vertical harp, MET, Harp 664–332 B.C., Late Period, Dynasty 26–30. Wood, paint traces.

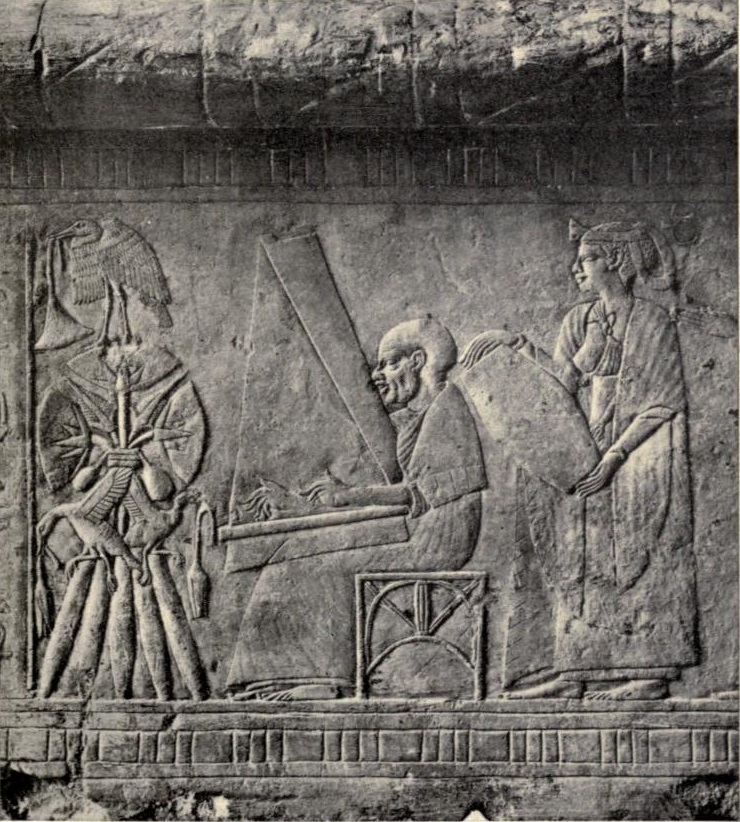
angular harp

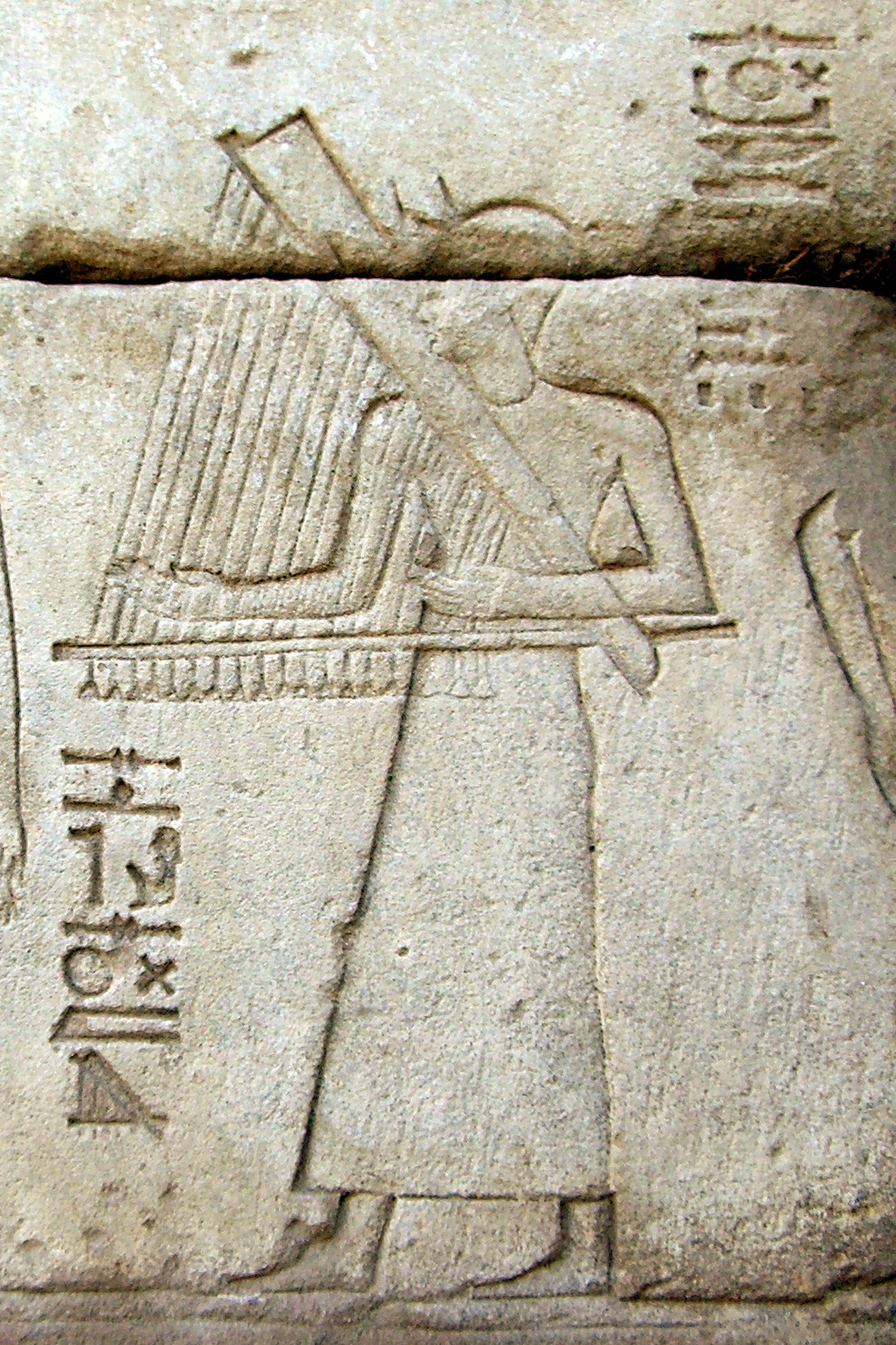
angular harp

== Ardin ==
The ardin is a type of angular harp played in Mauritania. It has a resonating body made of calabash, with 10 to 16 strings and metal rings affixed to the top of the neck, and a skin belly. It is played by female griots. The neck sits loosely in the calabash bowl, held in place by the strings. The skin belly can be drummed while the strings are being plucked. The strings act as jingles.

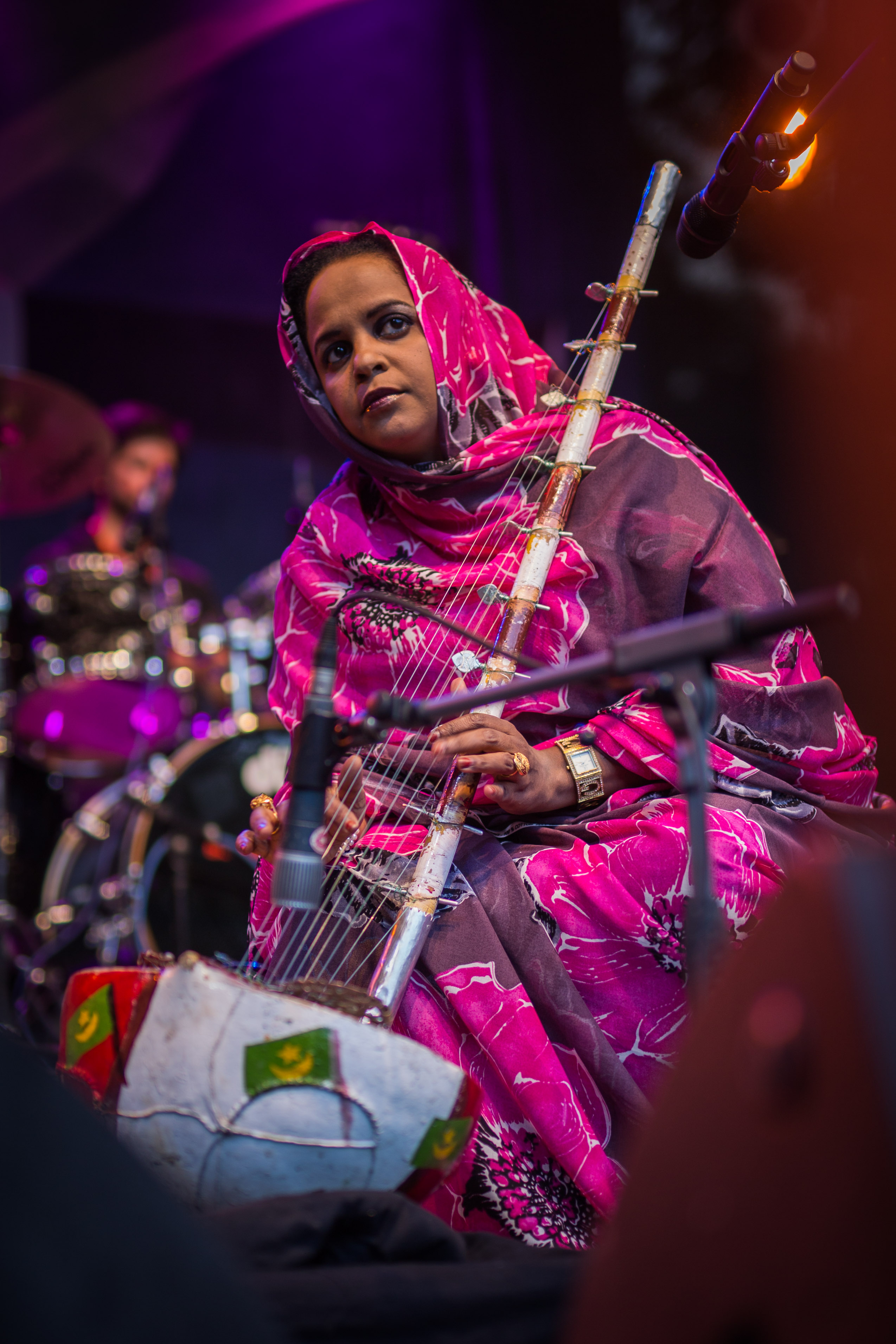
Noura Mint Seymali playing the ardin.

== Adungu ==
See Adungu

The a'dungu, also called the ekidongo or ennenga, is a stringed musical instrument of the Alur people of northwestern Uganda. It is an arched harp of varying dimensions, ranging from seven to ten string or more. The instrument is made of a hollowed-out slab of wood, which is covered by two pieces of leather, woven together in the center. The upper piece of leather functions as a soundboard, and a wooden rib supports it, serving also as a structure to secure the strings to the soundboard. A curved wooden neck, containing a tuning peg for each .note, is inserted into the end of the instrument's body. The strings run diagonally from the tuning pegs in the neck to the rib in the center of the body. Tuning is not standardized, and players will usually tune by ear to each other shortly before a performance. The a'dungus are not in a particular key, and the tonality can be adapted to the preferences of the performers.

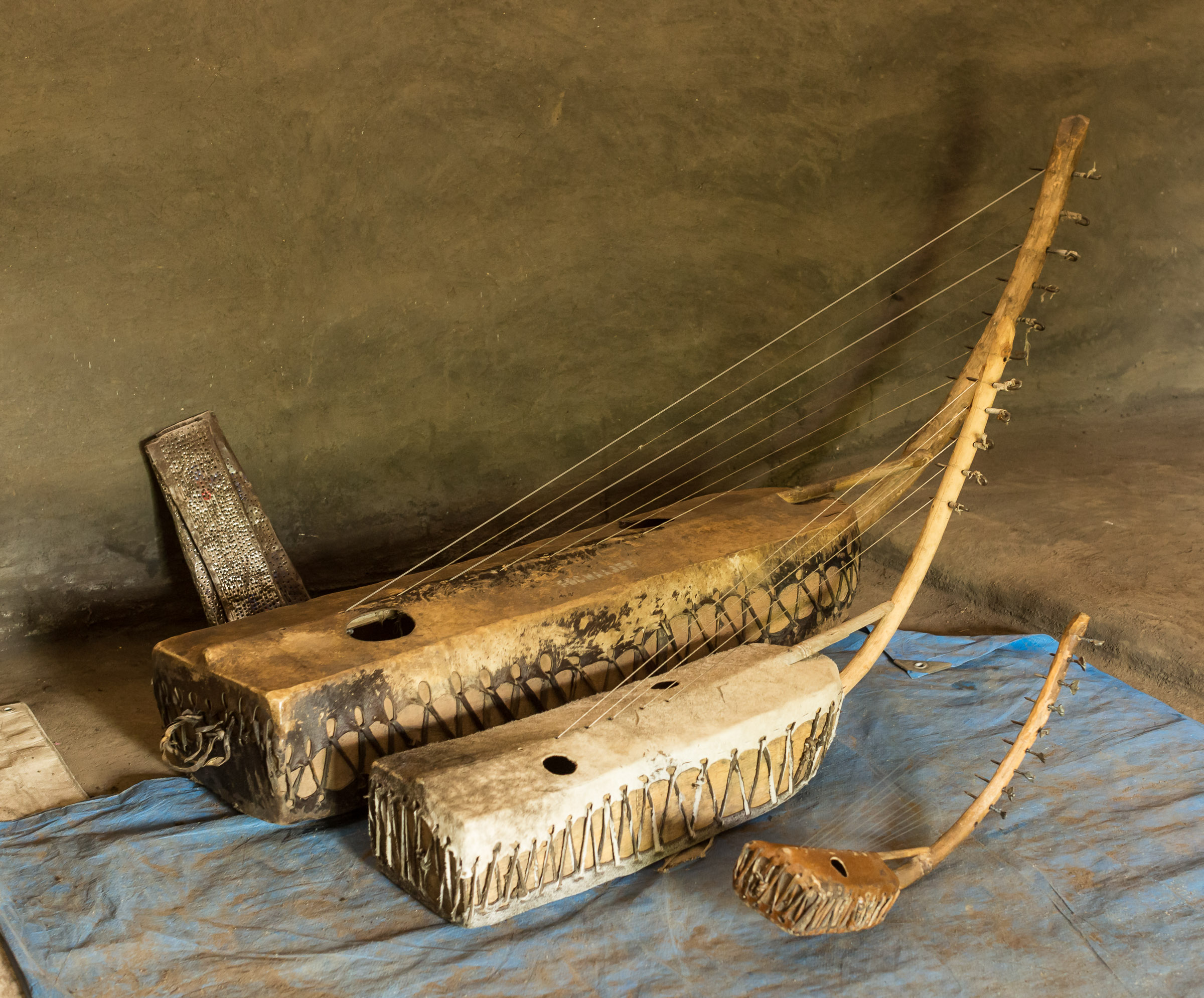
Uganda. Three sizes: adungu, ekidongo, or ennenga. The large adungu creates an incredibly rich, bass sound.

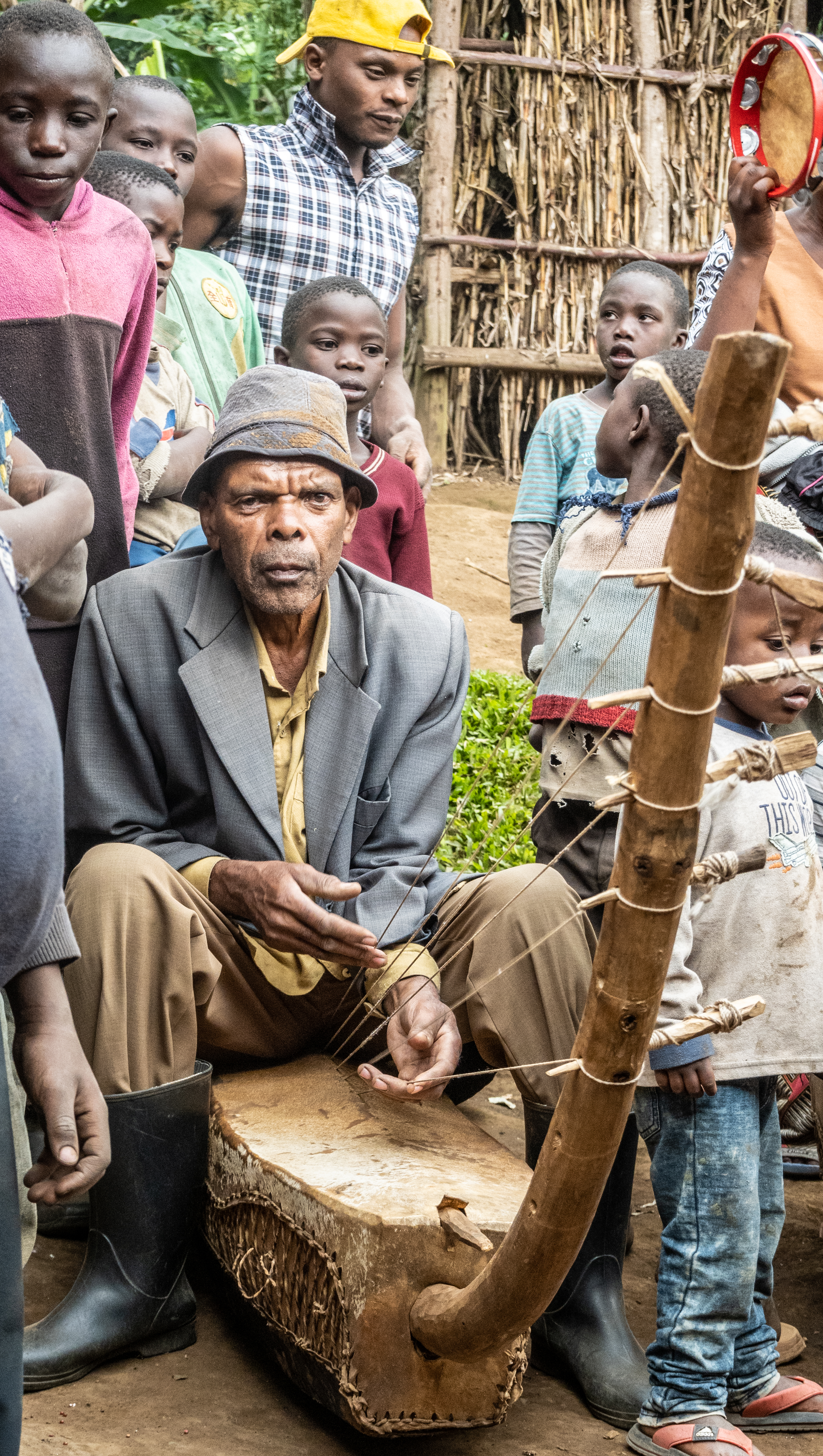
Adungu player in Kisoro/Uganda

== Enanga ==
The ennanga, nanga, nnanga or enanga is a type of arched harp played by the Ganda people of Uganda. The sound box is made of a single piece of wood and roughly hemispherical. The top of the box is a stretched resonant membrane made of antelope skin, tied to a piece of hide at the bottom of the box. The neck is attached to the inside of the box, exits through a small round opening on the membrane, and curves upward for about 60 to 70 cm. Seven or eight strings are attached to a piece of wood inside the box, and extend through the skin to tuning pegs inserted along the neck. Sometimes small metallic rattling pieces are attached to the pegs, to color the sound. It is usually used to accompany men's singing.

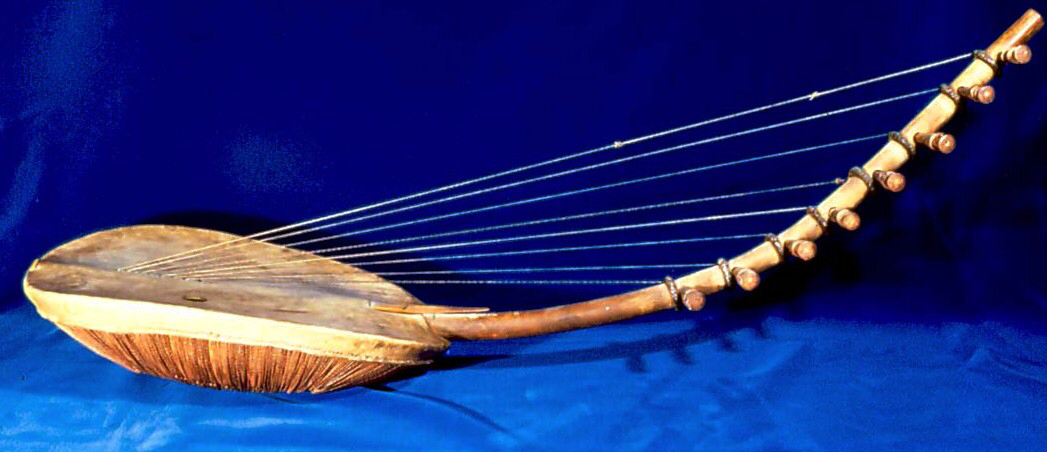
Ennanga, 19th century, Ganda people

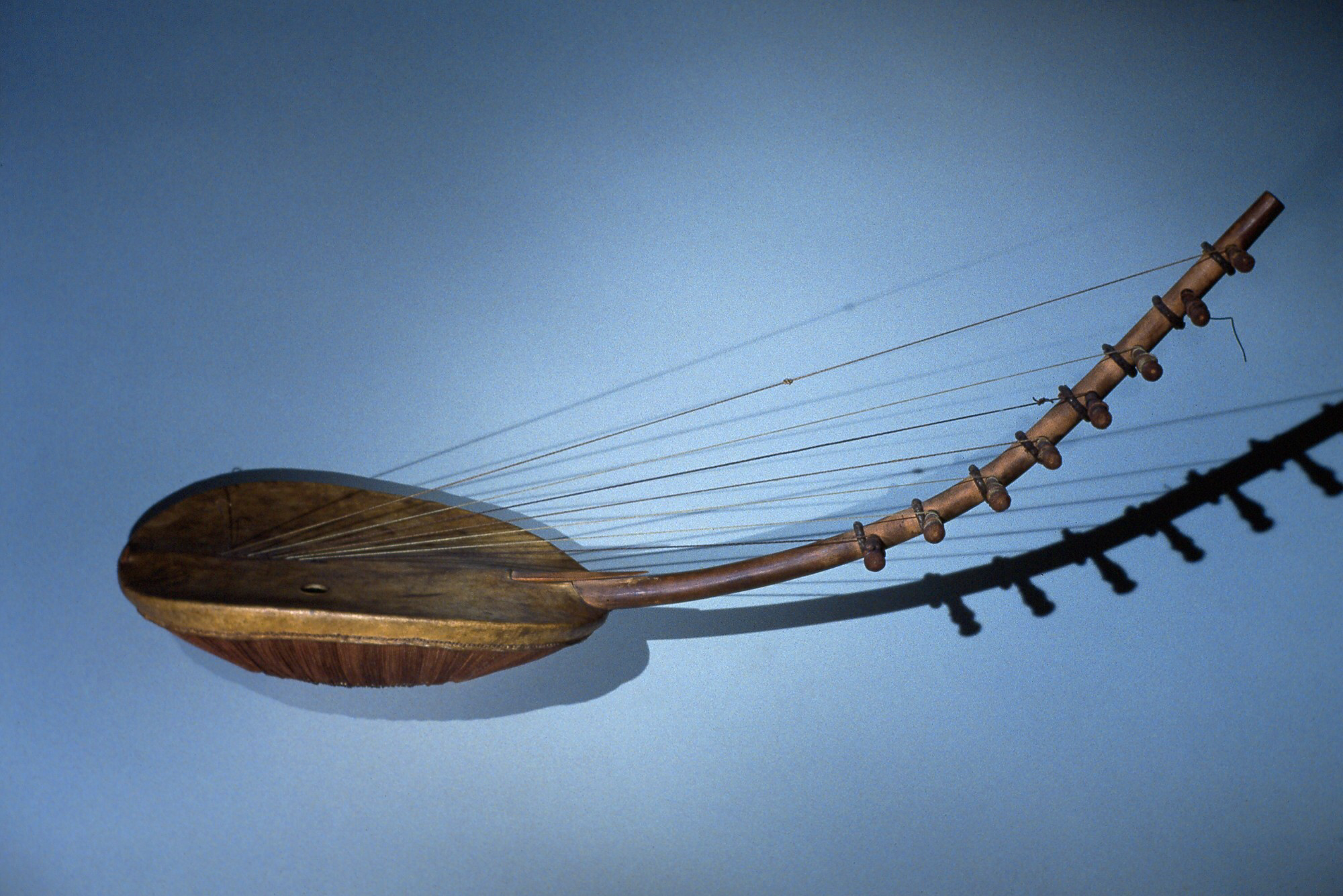
Ennanga, 19th century, instrument of the Ganda people

Abalanga (harpists) are skilled performers and composers who work within a very structured paradigm to ensure that no two abalanga performances are the same.

== Kundi ==
The kundi is the five-string harp of the Azande and related people of Central Africa. It is an instrument traditionally played by young men and boys. A similar type of harp played by the Nzakara people. The instruments are well known for their ornately carved heads. The instrument has generally fallen from popularity, though in 1993 some older players were recorded on the album Central African Republic: music of the former Bandia courts.

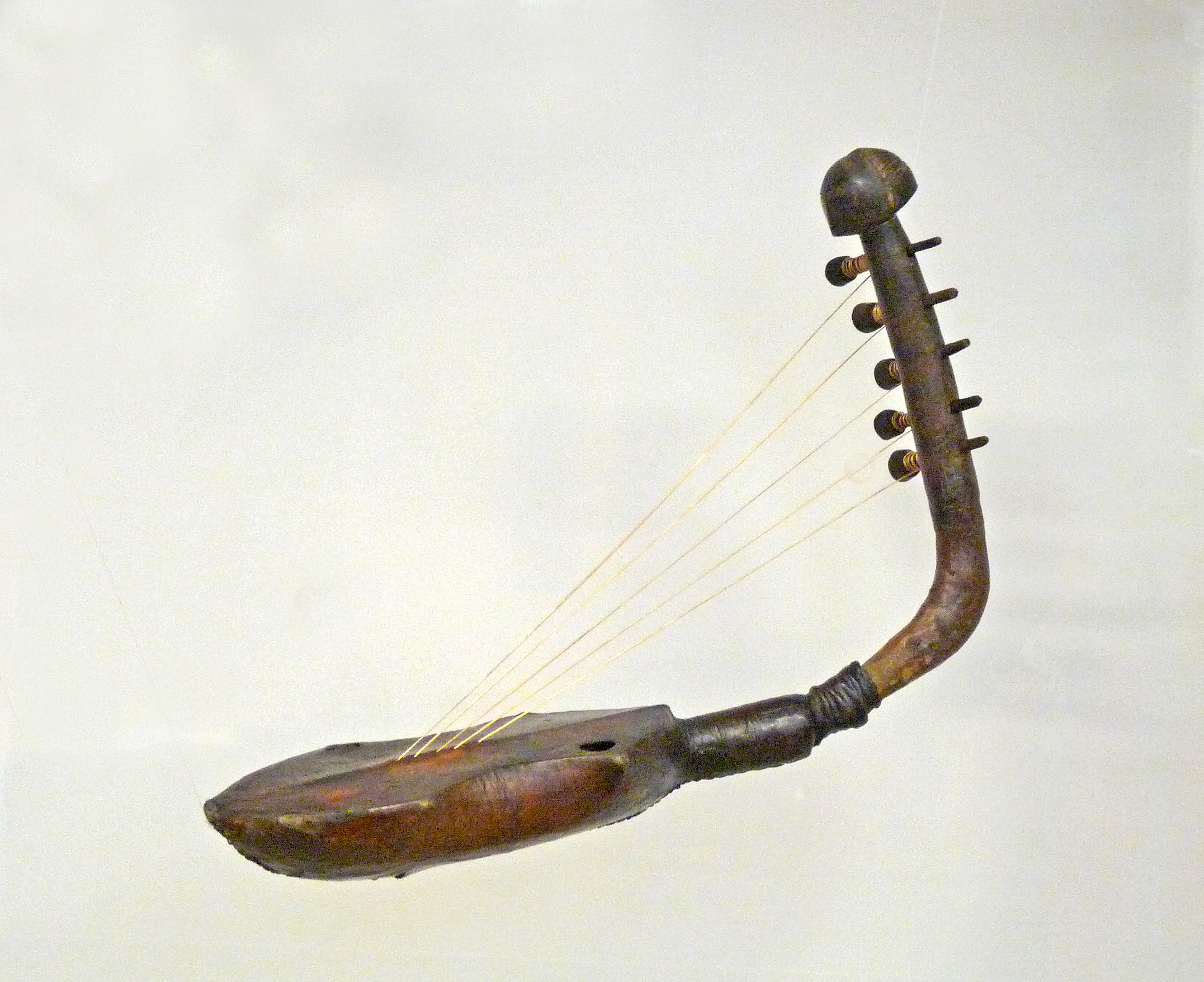
Azande kundi harp, from the Royal Museum for Central Africa.

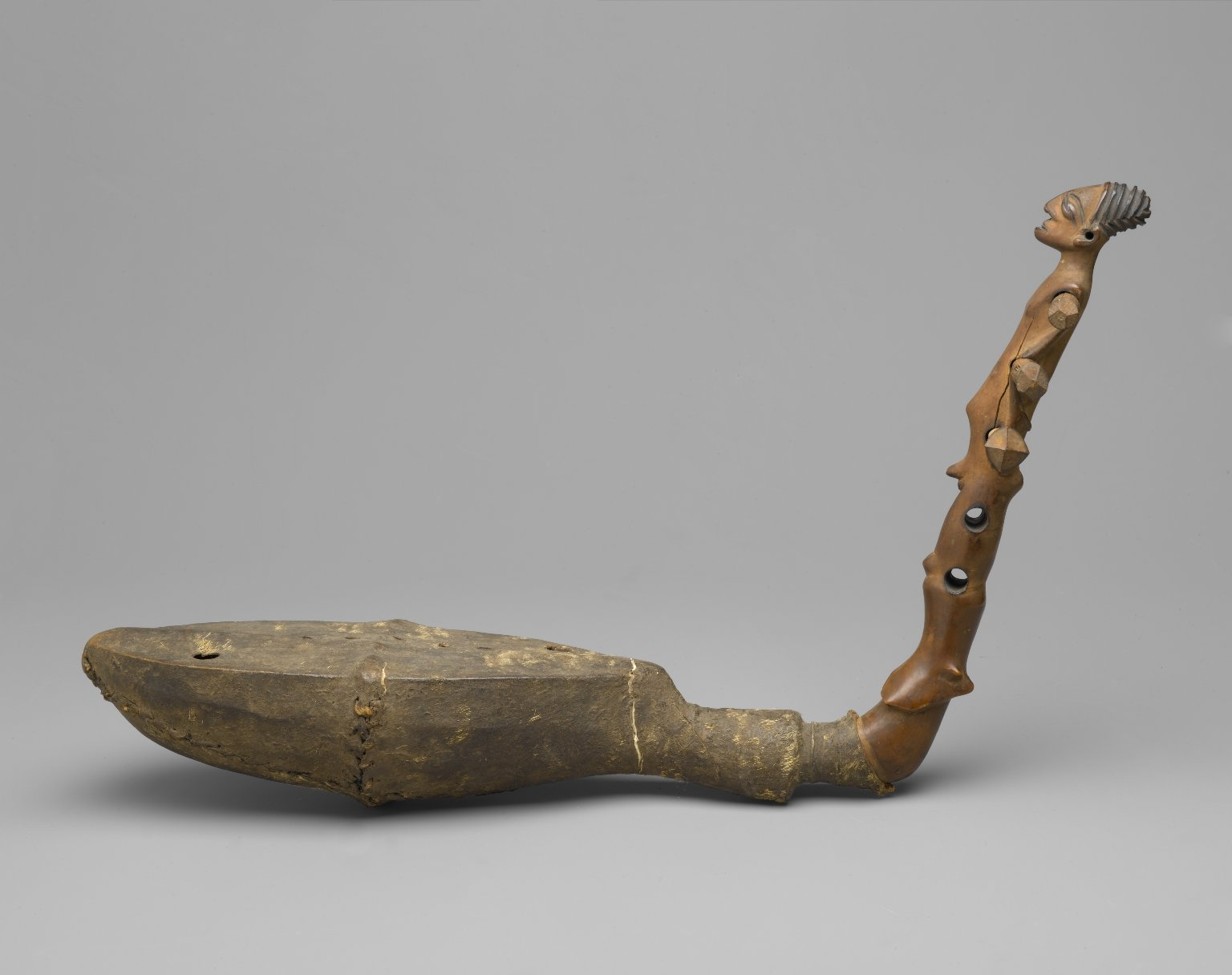
Kundi. Part of the Mangbetu culture, made in Ubangi or Uele region, Democratic Republic of the Congo.

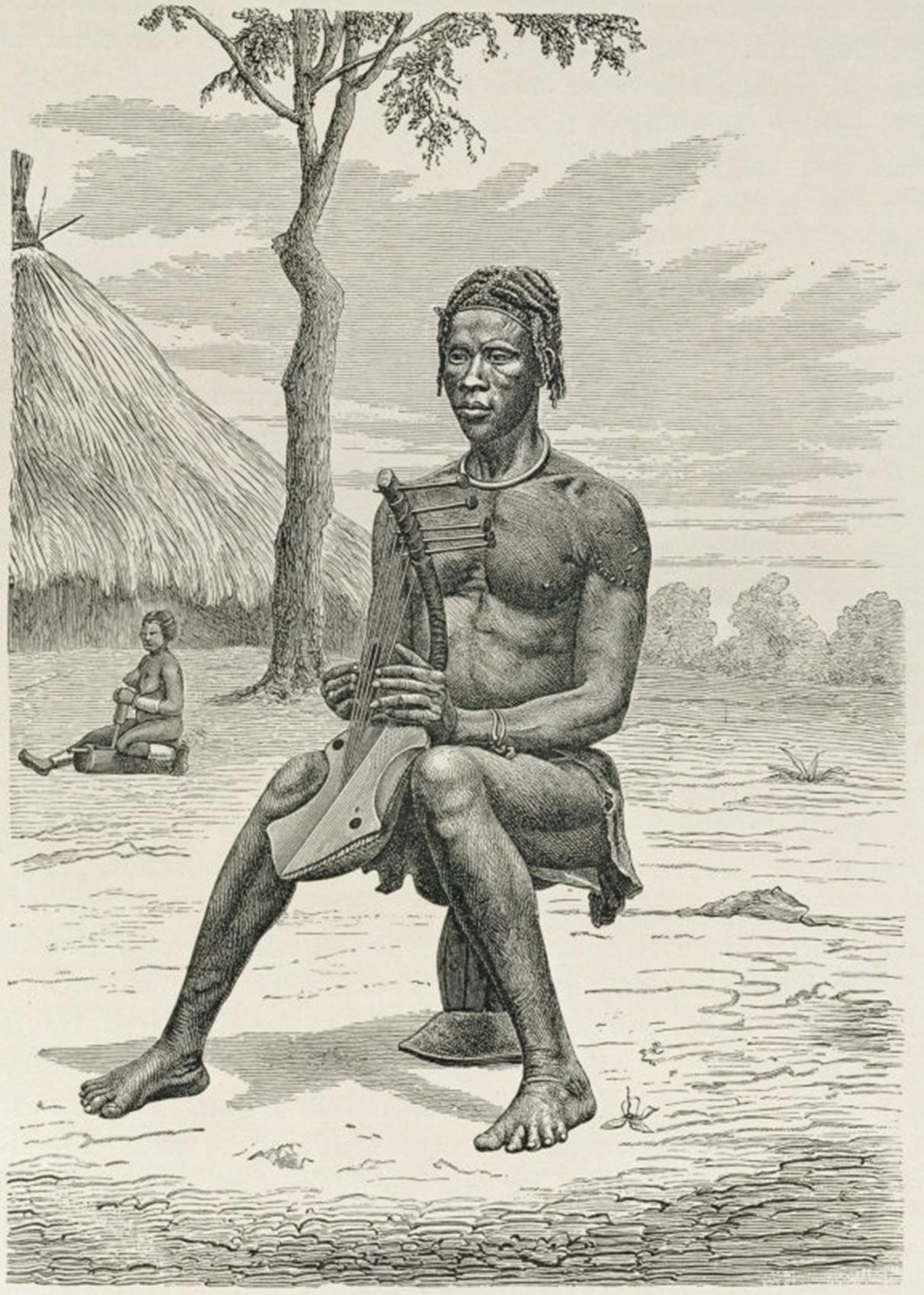
Zande harp player

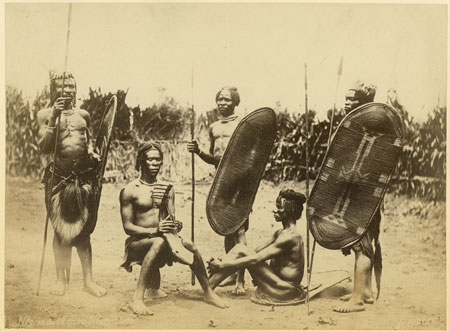
Azande harper, 1877–80

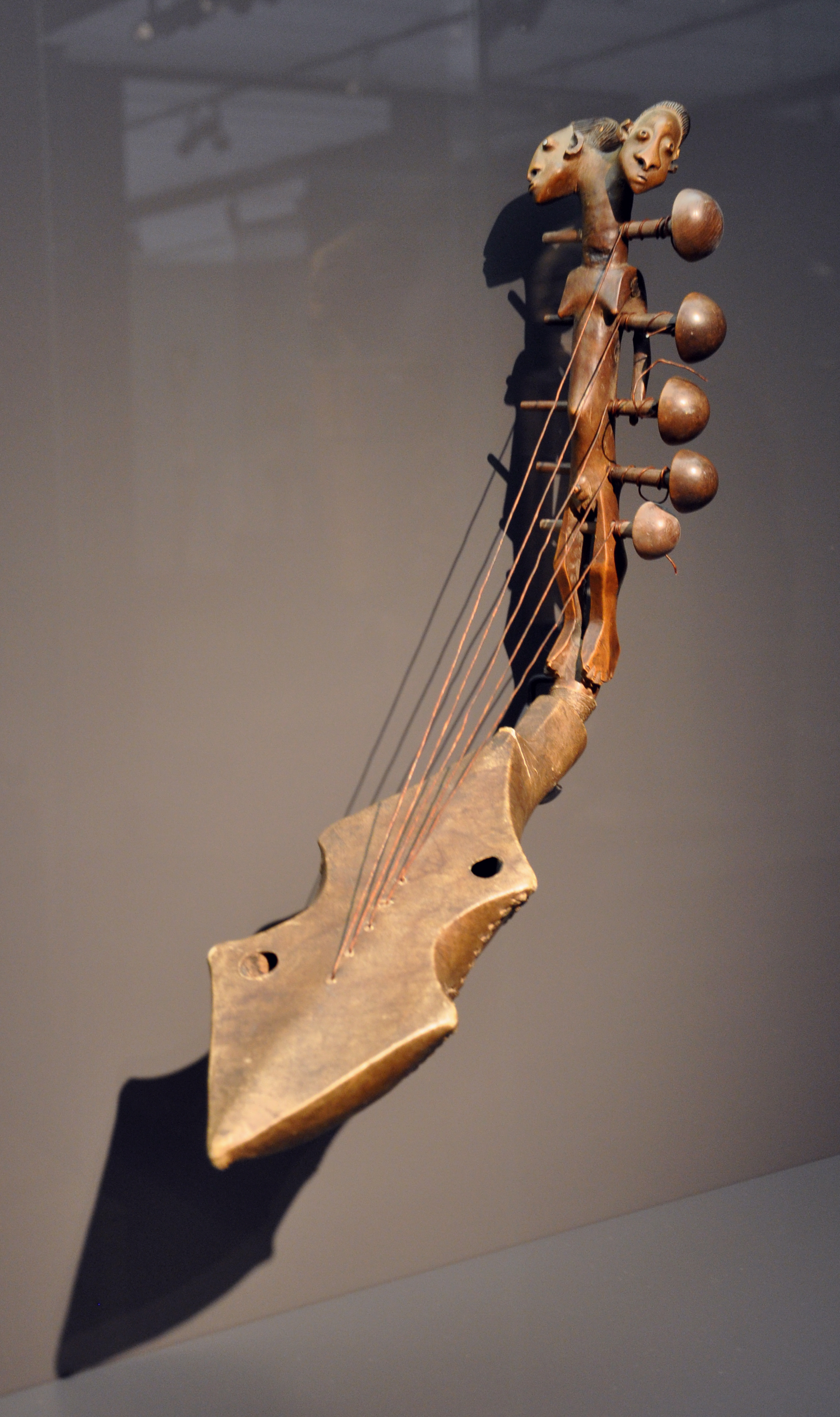
1850-1900, Mangbetu people.

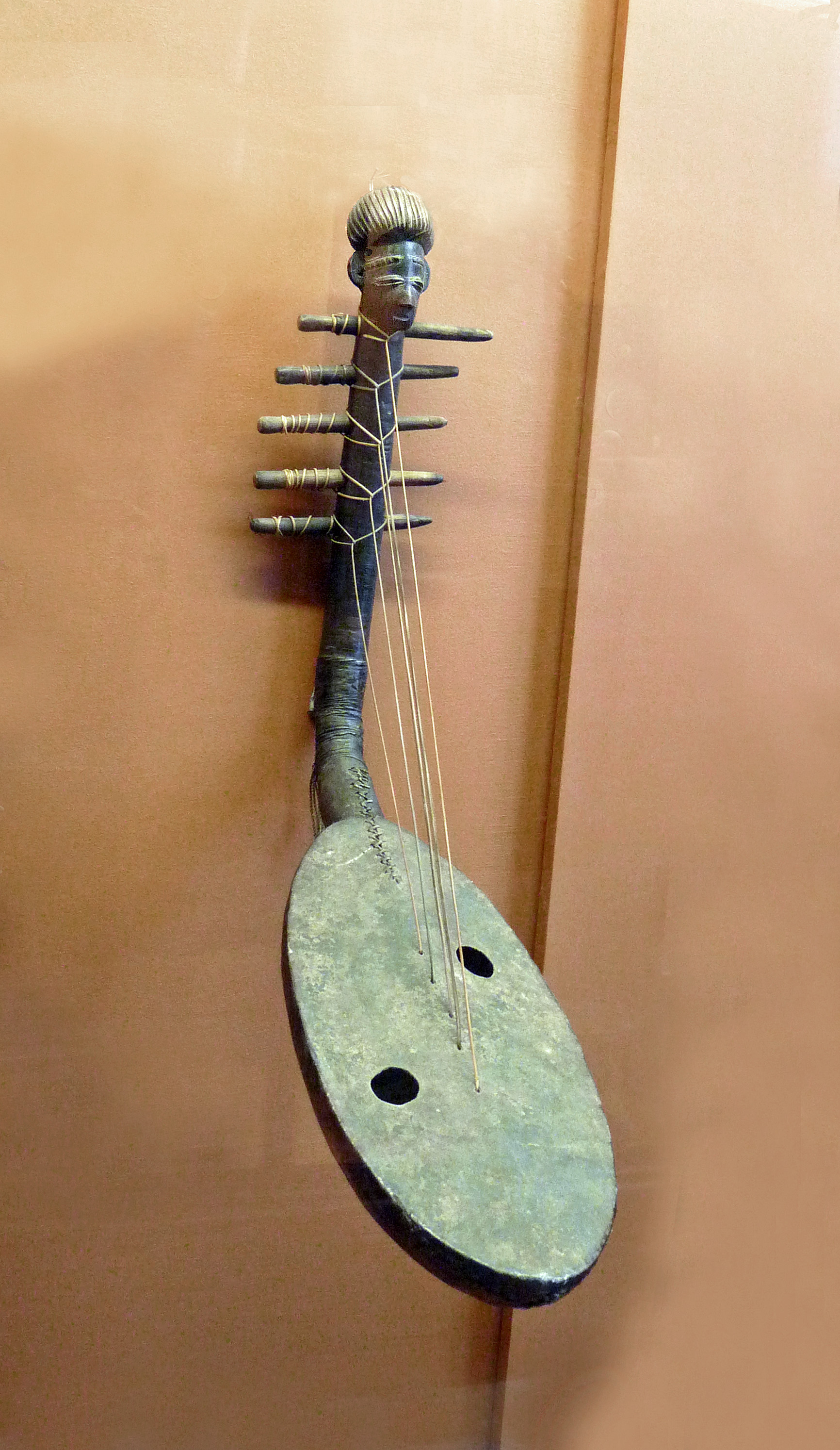
Oval style kundi. Azande people.

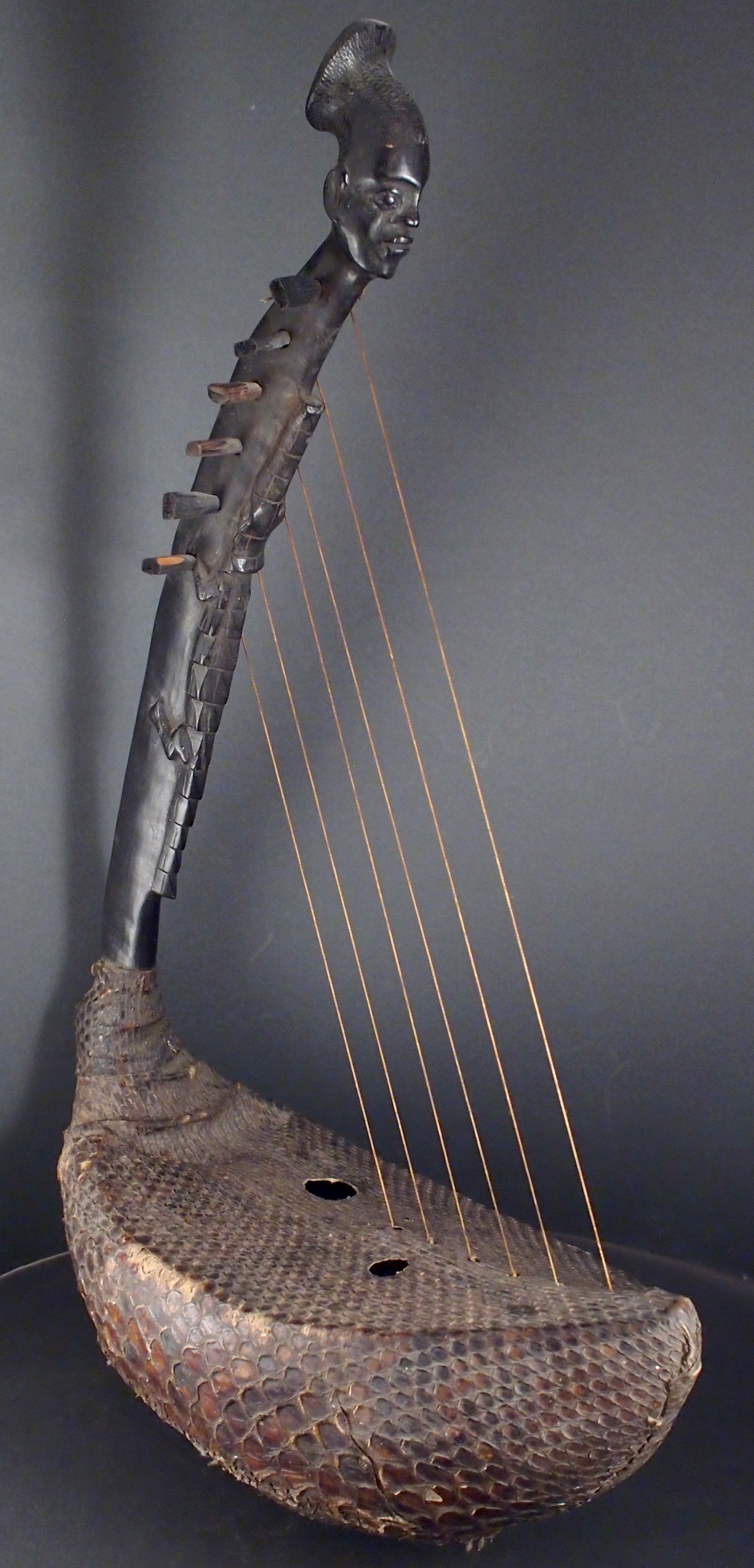
Sudan, Mangbetu people, intricately carved domu harp with snake skin.

== Ombi ==
Gabon and Guinea have a harp called ombi or ngombi. The instrument has between 4 and 8 stings, originally made of plant fiber. Instead of winding a peg to tighten the strings, the instrument had immovable pegs, with the strings being wound around them. The body of the instrument is shaped like a trough and has a skin belly. The instrument is played by holding it against the body with the wrists and plucked.

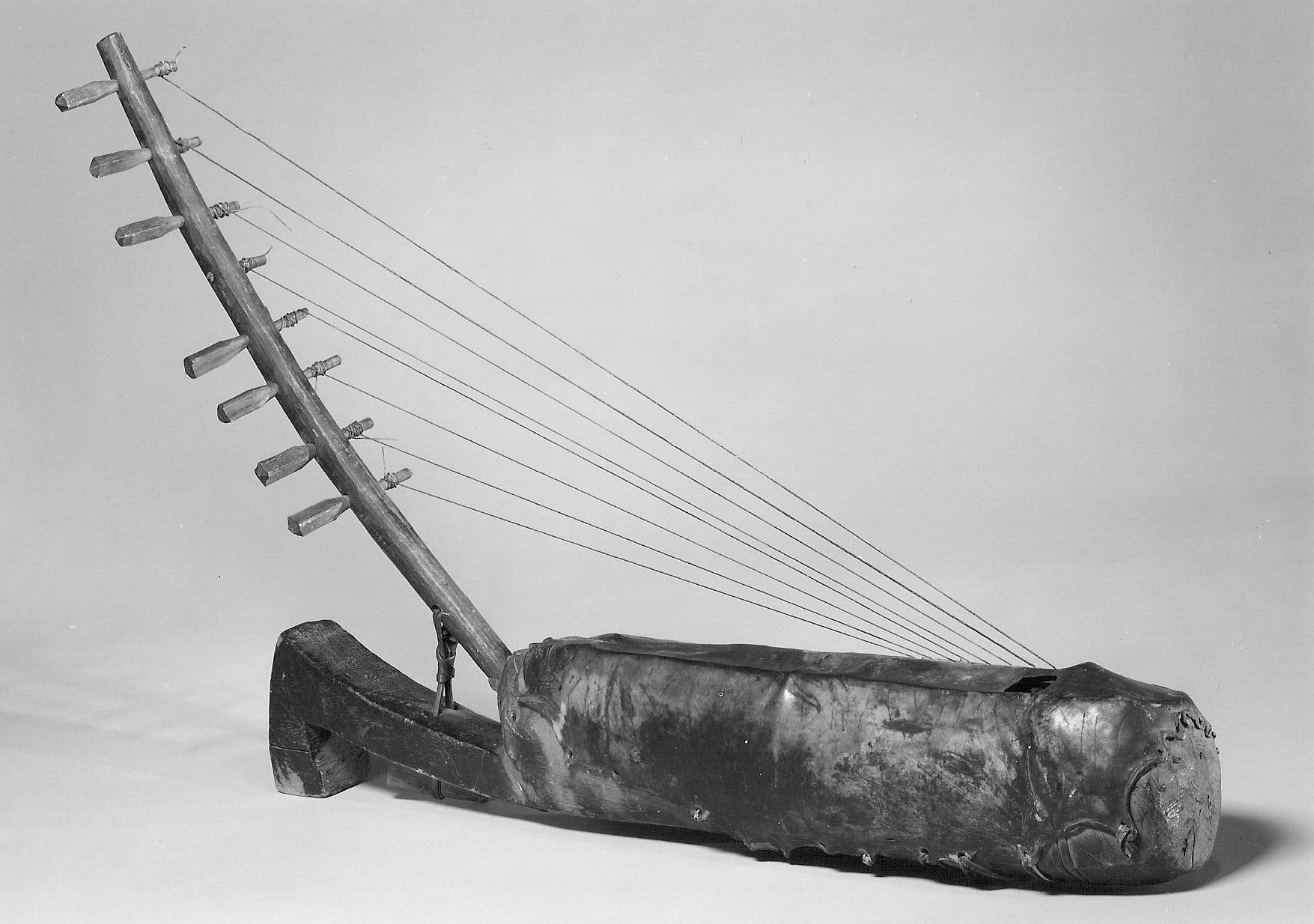
19th century Ngombi arched harp, Gabon.

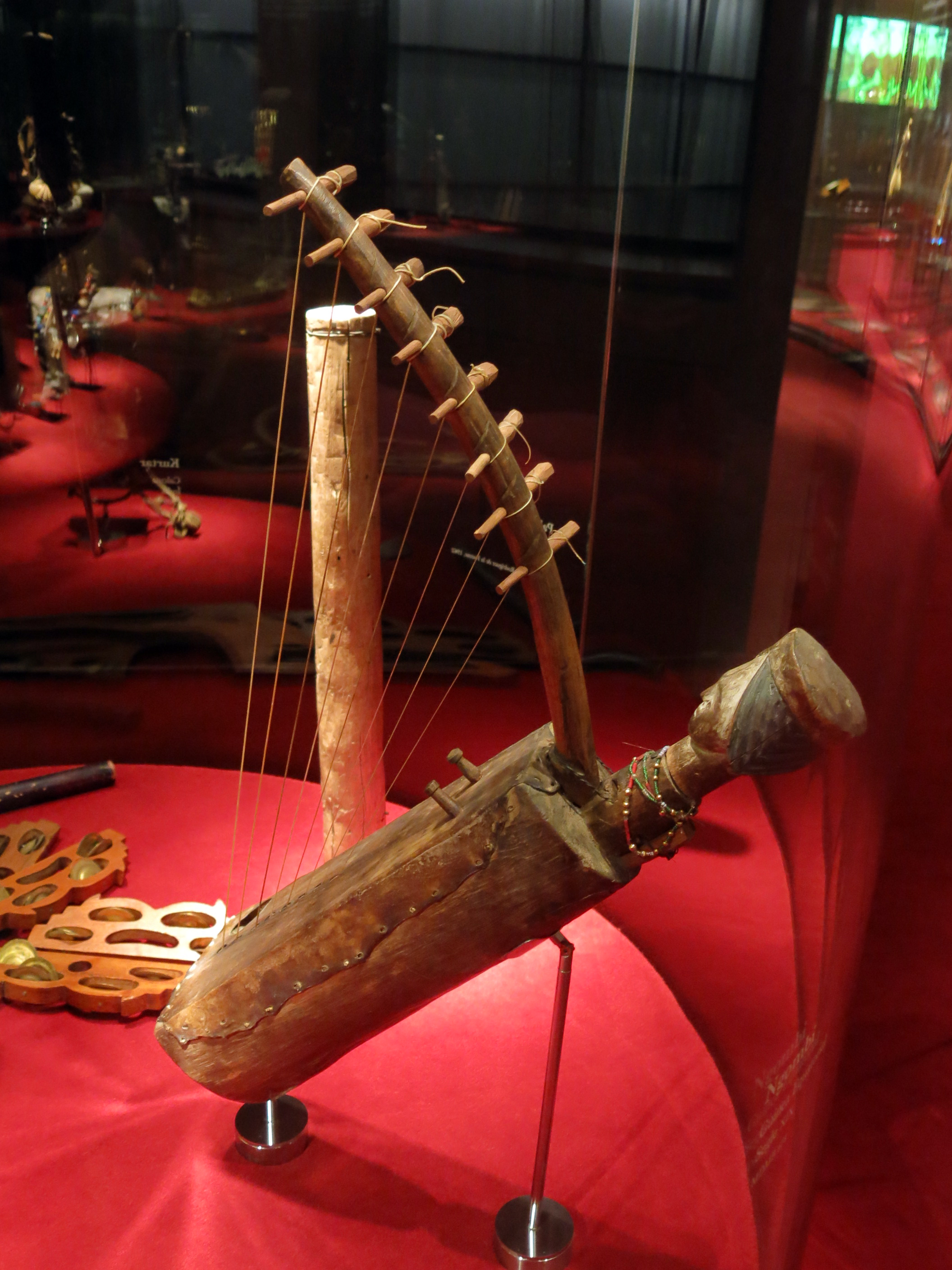
Ngombi. Equatorial Guinea. First half 20th century. Barcelona Music Museum.

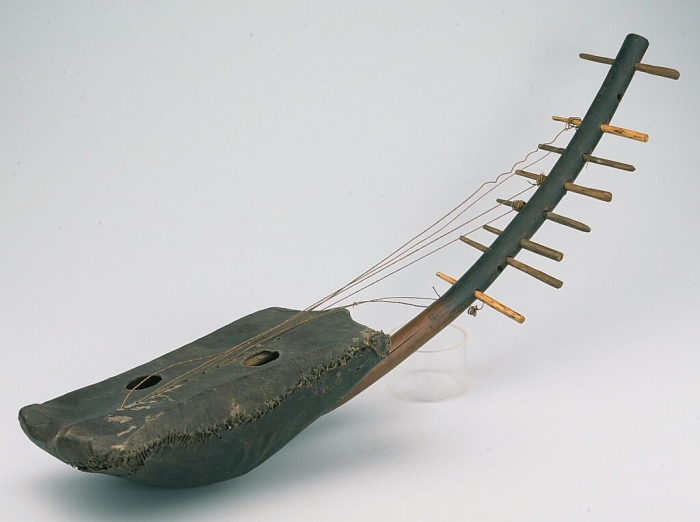
Harp from the Fang culture of Gabon.

== Gallery ==
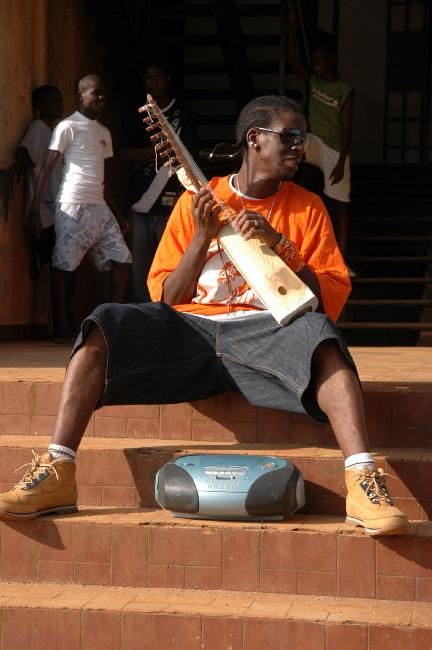
Gabonese harp played by Lord Ekomy Ndong, a Gabonese Hip-Hop musician

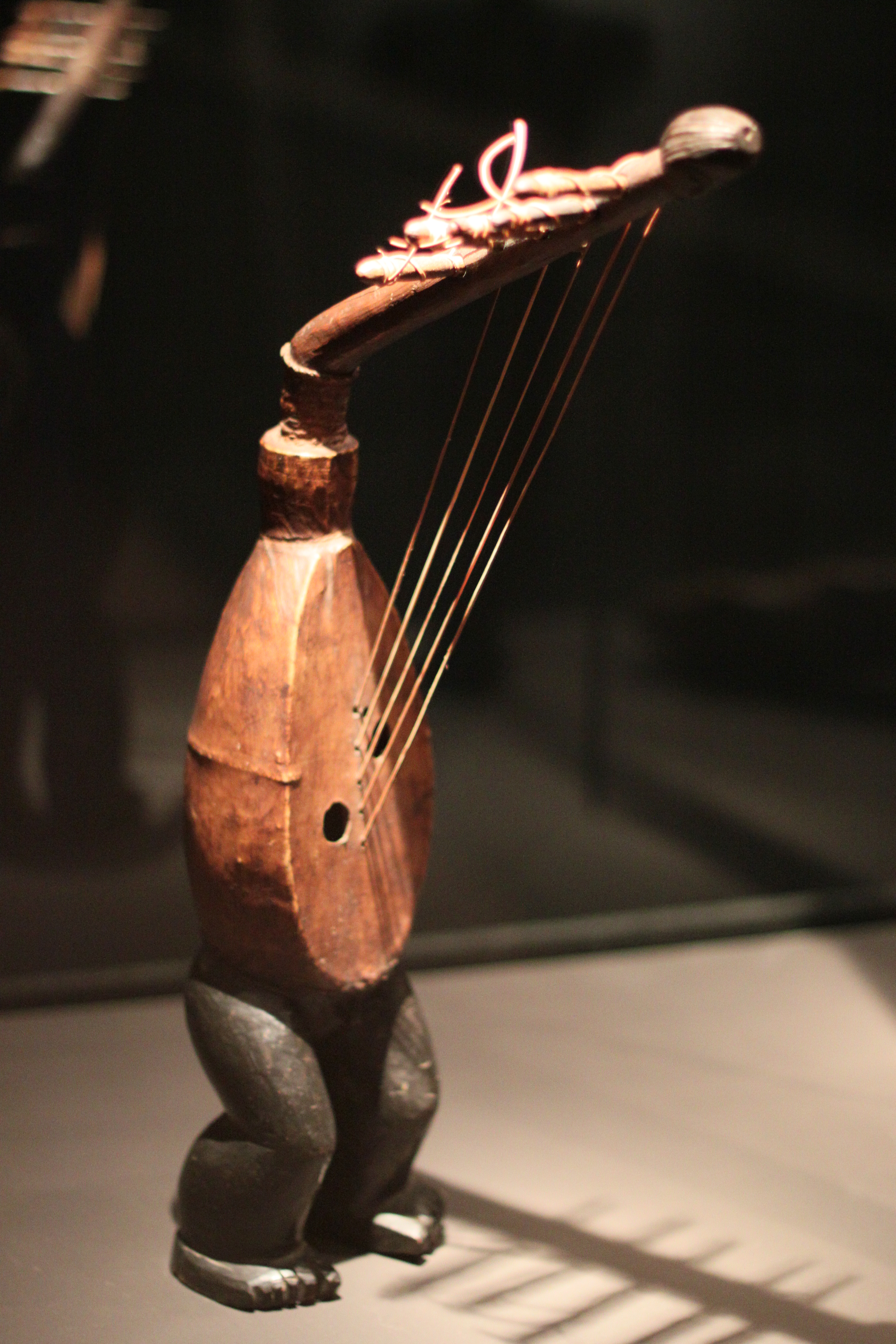
An arched harp of the Mbaka people, from the Democratic Republic of the Congo

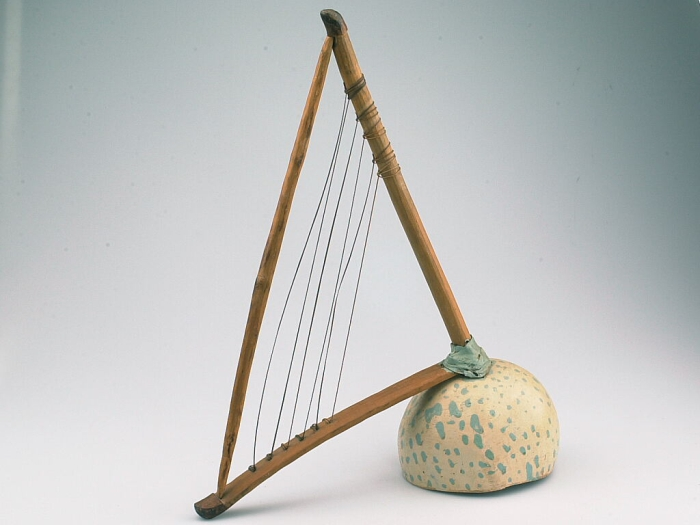
The Loma or belly harp has the appearance of an angle harp or lyre. However it is a frame zither.

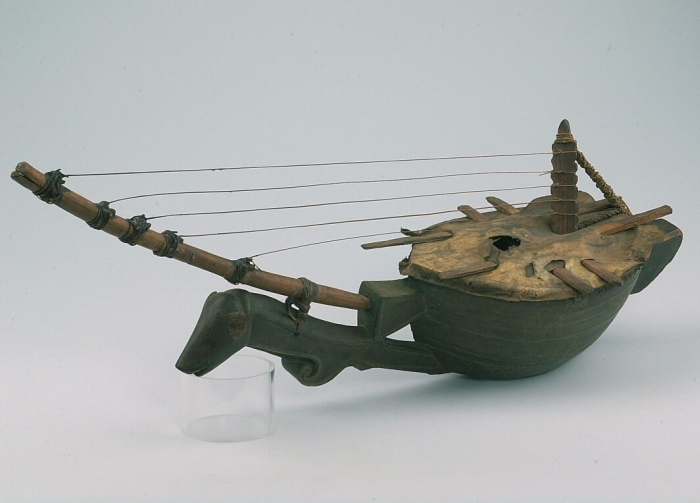
This is not strictly a harp, but a harp-lute. West Africa.

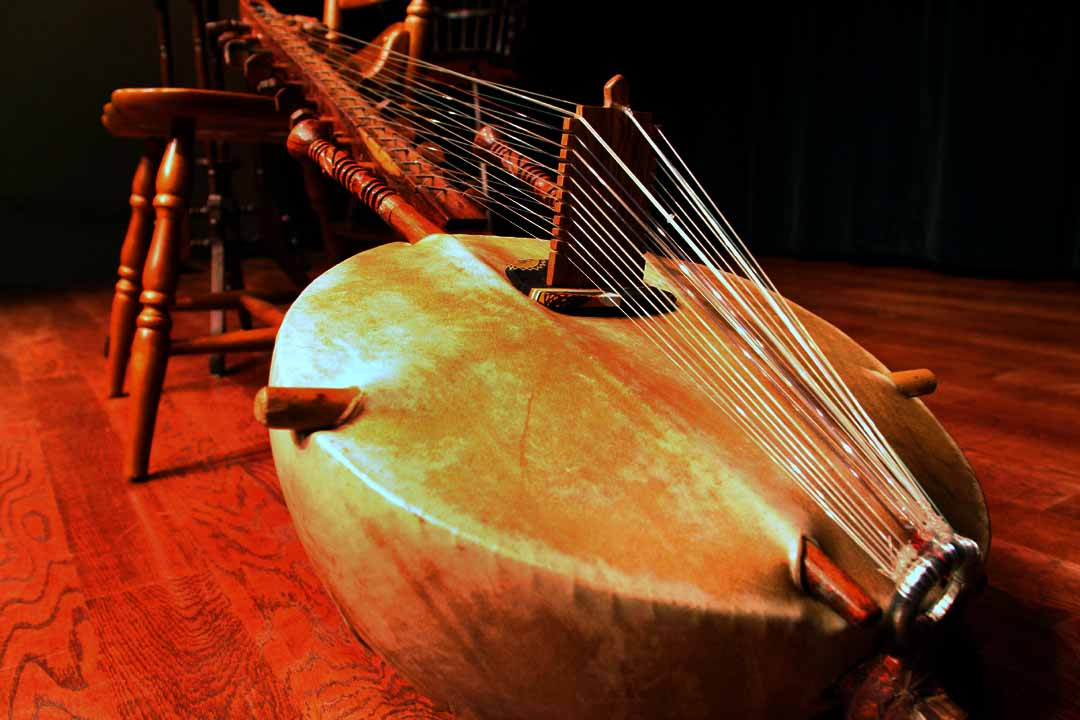
Kora. Another instrument between a harp and lute.

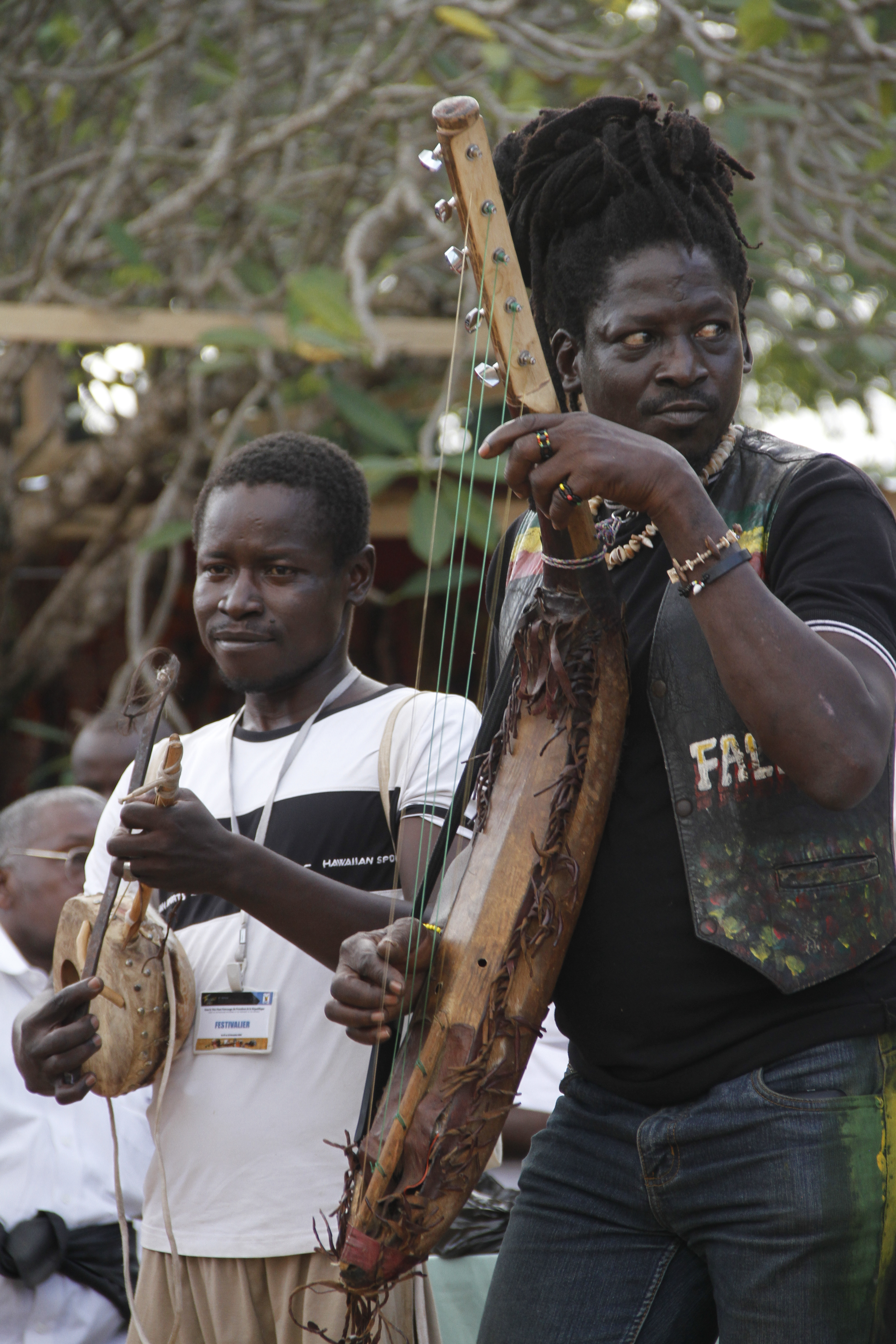
Harp in Cameroon

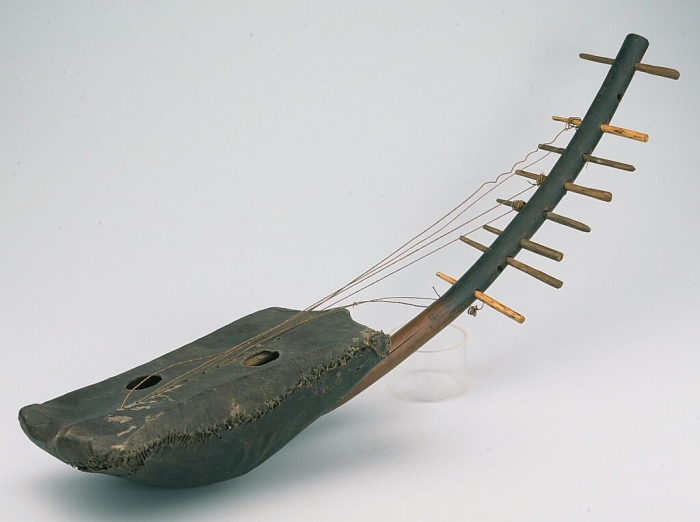
Democratic Republic of the Congo. 10 stringed harp. Does not fit the 3 harp types.

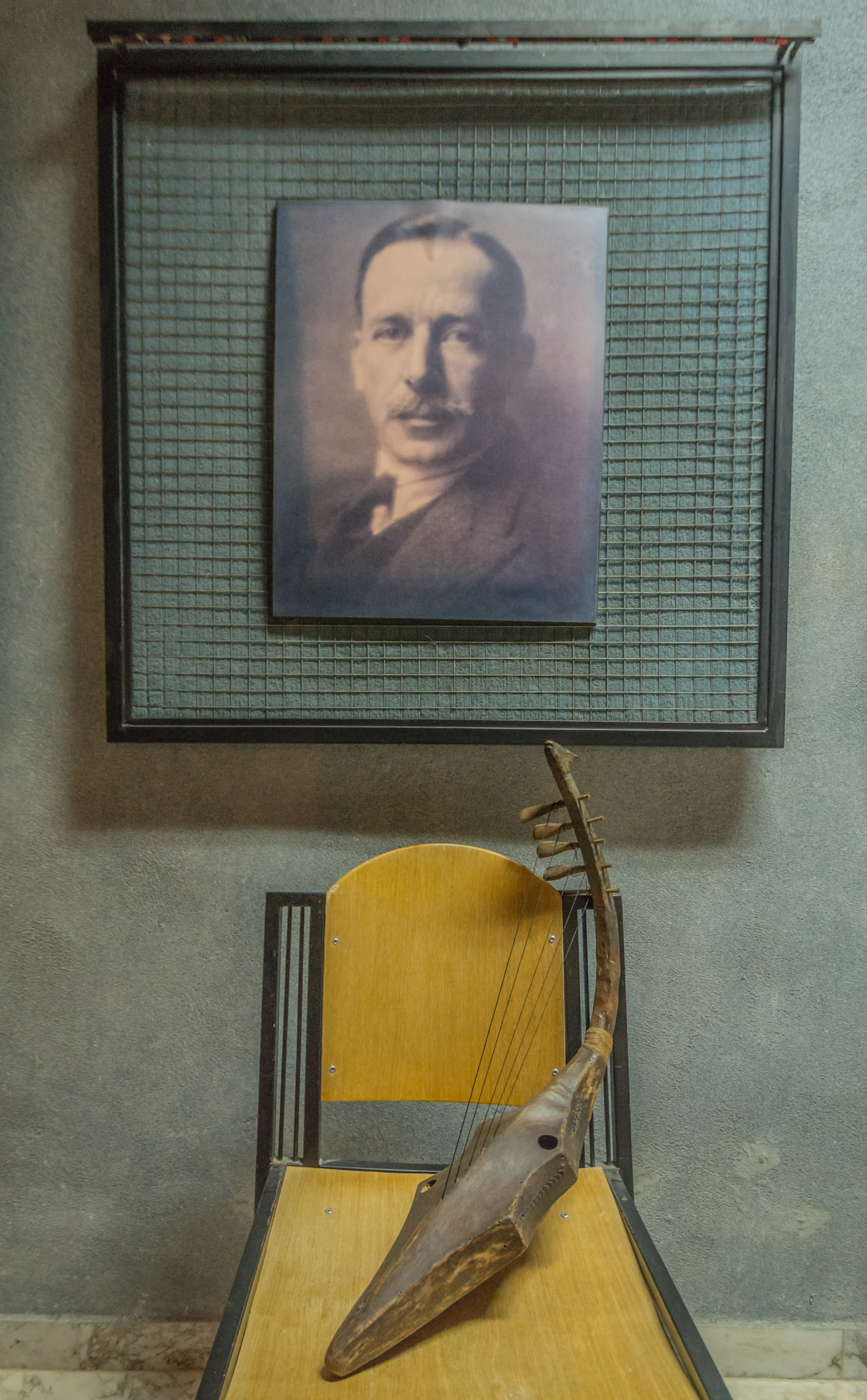
Tunisia.

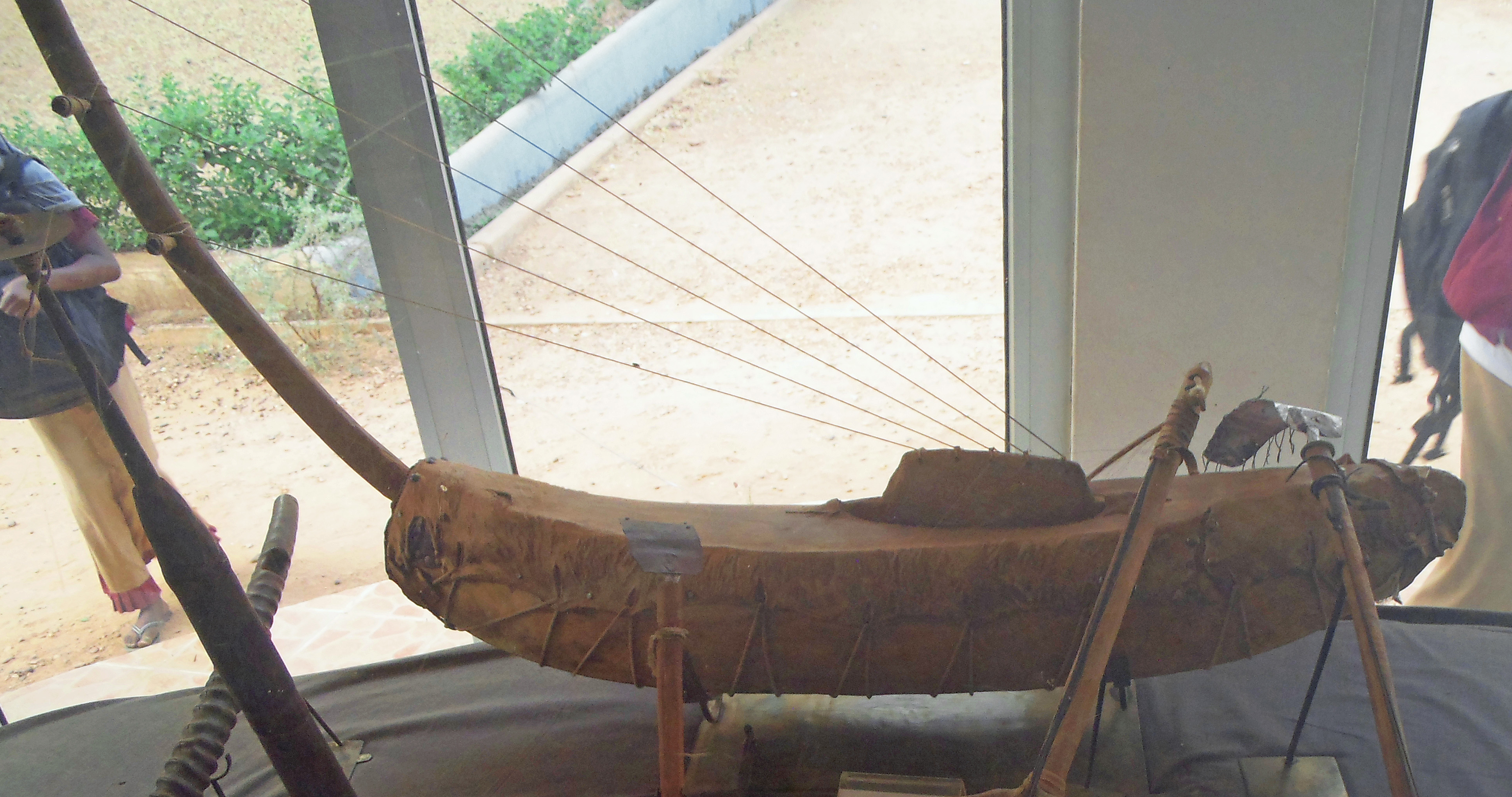
Biram, an African bow harp of the Boudouma people in Eastern Niger. Boubou Hama National Museum. May also be the same as a Yom biBagirmi in which the strings run from the arched neck to a metal plate in the body.

== Bow harps, three types according to Wachsmann ==
Organologists have analyzed the way African bow harps are put together and found three basic types.

=== Spoon in the cup, type 1 ===
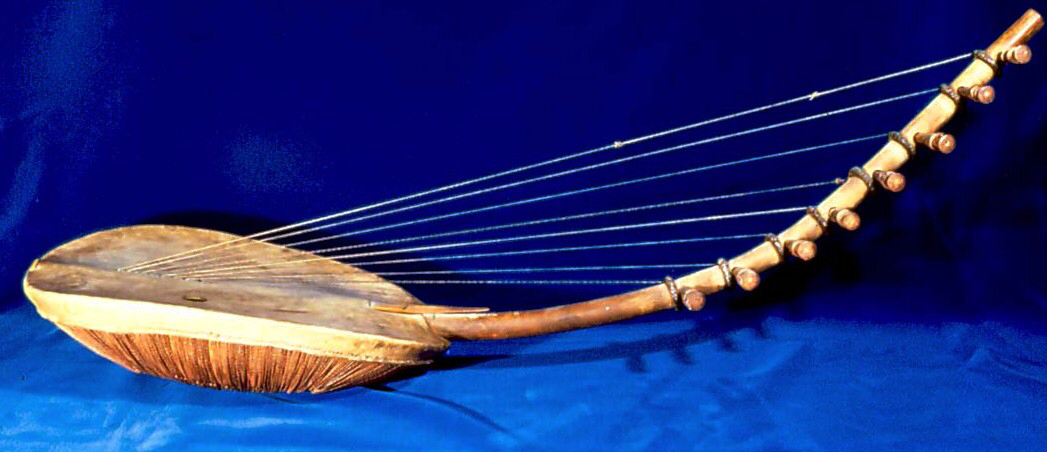
Typ 1: ennanga, lying with the neck on the rim of the bowl. 19th century. Metropolitan Museum of Art

In the "spoon in a cup" type, the lower end of the curved neck (string carrier) lies loosely on the edge of the flat, bowl-shaped body and protrudes to about the middle of the bottom. At the height of the integument, a rod serving as a suspension bar for the strings is inserted into the neck and attached with its other end to the opposite edge of the resonance bowl. The construction, consisting of three parts, is only stable due to the tensioned strings.

This type, which occurs exclusively in Uganda, includes the ennanga of the Baganda, the ekidongo of the Nyoro, the kimasa of the Basoga, the five-stringed opuk agoya (or lotewrokuma ) of theAcholi and the tum of the Langi, also consisting of a turtle shell as a resonator. Due to the relatively limited range, Gerhard Kubik (1982) concludes that this type arrived in the region long ago and independently of the other types.

It is unclear how the "spoon in the cup" type came south through Sudan, but this probably happened before the Luo immigration to Kenya in the 16th century. Like many other Nilotic peoples, the Luo are predominantly not players of harps but of lyres (like the tom ). The oral tradition can be summarized in the case of the ennangaas far back as Kabaka Nakibinge (ruled c. 1494–1524), to whom it was played on the Ssese Islands in Lake Victoria.

=== Cork in the bottle, type 2 ===
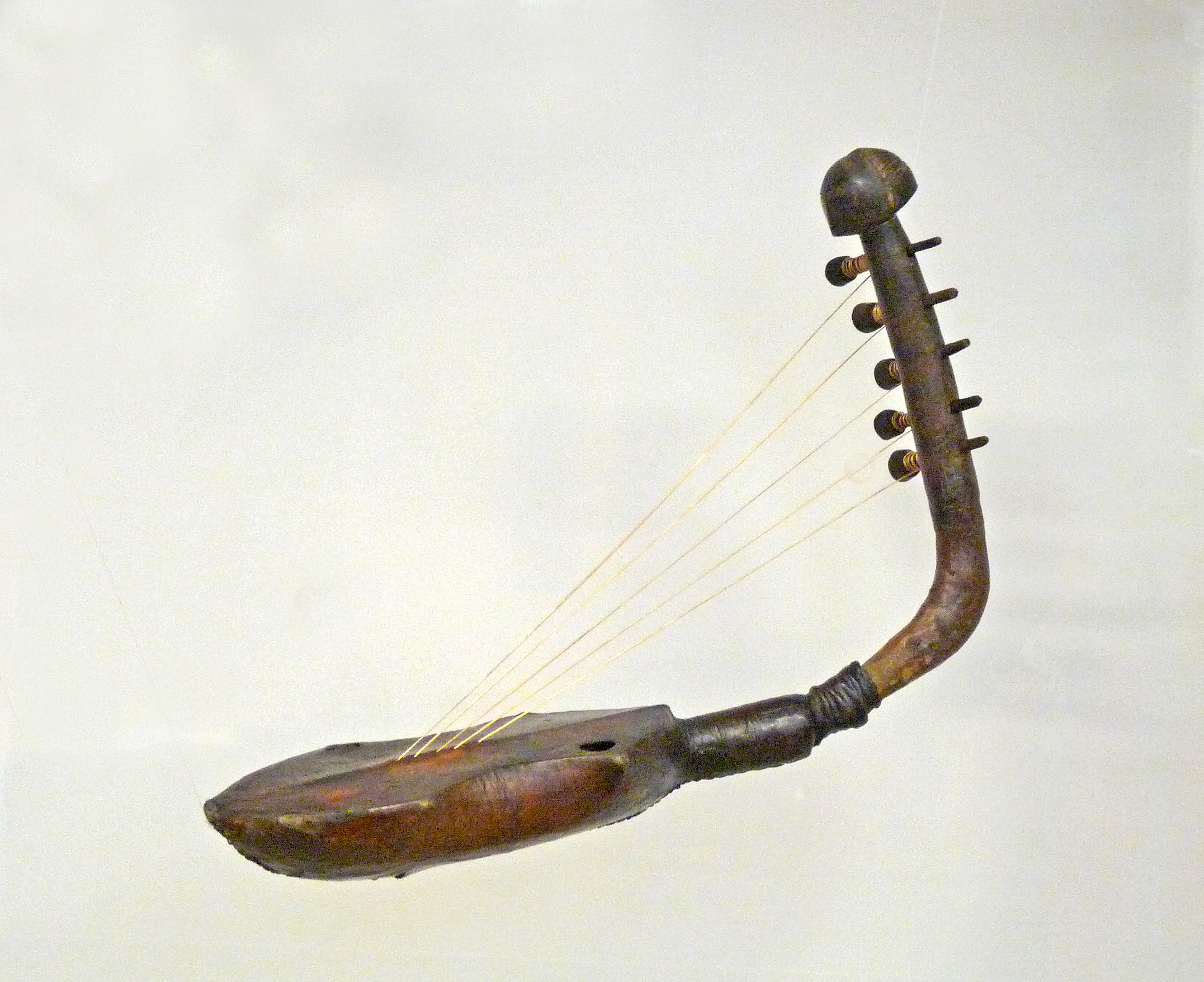
Typ 2: five-string arched harp kundi of the Azande with a pronounced bottleneck. Royal Museum for Central Africa in Tervuren, Belgium.

The image of the "cork in the bottle" for the second type describes a wooden body that has a spout-shaped opening at one end into which the lower end of the neck is inserted. This results in a solid connection. In some forms the junction is distinctly set off, forming a ridge in the outline in profile, in others the broad base has been wrapped in skin or occasionally carved as a human head.

Also known as the tanged type, it occurs in central Africa north of the equator. Typical harps are the kundi of the Azande in northern Congo, the domu of the Mangbetuin north-eastern Democratic Republic of the Congo, as well as in Uganda, the kinanga of the Bakonjo of the Rwenzori Mountains, the ore or orodo of the Madi in northern Uganda and southern Sudan, and the adungu of the Alur.

In general, there are considerable differences in form and playing style between the musical instruments of the Nilotic peoples of northern Uganda (including the Alur adungu ) and those of the Bantu ( Baganda ennanga, Basoga kimasa ) of southern Uganda.

=== Shelved type, type 3 ===
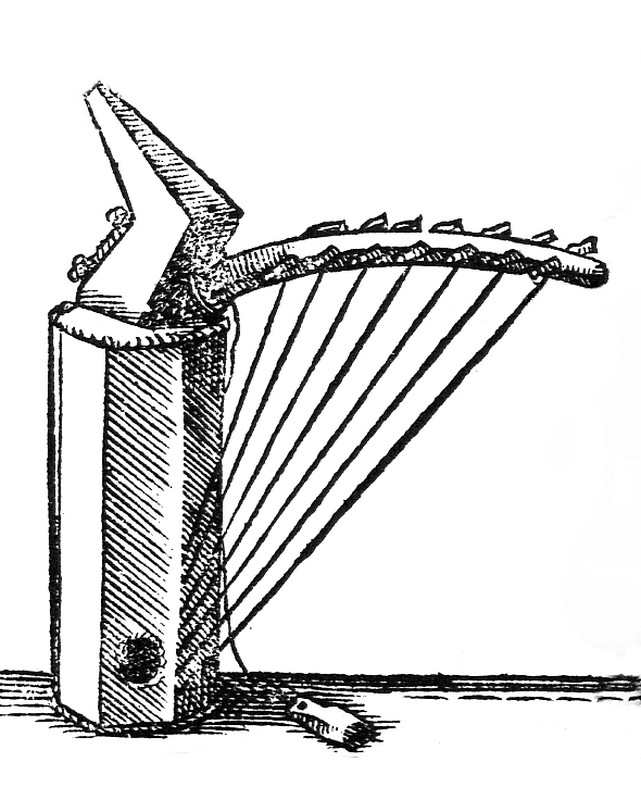
Typ 3: Detail from Plate XXXI in Syntagma musicum by Michael Praetorius, 1619. Probably shows a bowed harp of the Kele in Gabon with eight strings (one string is broken).

In the third type, called the shelved type ("the type provided with a board"), the resonator has a board to which the string carrier is attached or occasionally plugged. The base board is the criterion for this type, although it can occasionally take the form of a human head.

The distribution region extends along the Atlantic Ocean from Gabon to southern Cameroon and includes two isolated occurrences in Ghana and Ivory Coast.

A bowed harp of this type is in the musicological text Syntagma musicum by Michael Praetorius(1619) pictured. In addition to a pluriarc, Plate XXXI also shows a Central African bowed harp for the first time. The representation of a body made of several boards was probably modeled on an eight-string bowed harp observed among the Kele (Bakele, Kélé -speaker) on the coast of Gabon. Portuguese sailors had landed there in 1470 and had soon established trade relations.

Gerhard Kubik (2000) concludes from Praetorius' figure that type 3 in Gabon may have evolved from type 2 well before the 17th century through the adoption of local forms in Gabon and the Congo, primarily from the Pluriarc.

== Theory, how the harp spread across Africa ==
In 1982, Gerhard Kubik (1982) took a harp classification system devised by Klauss Wachsmann typology to show possible ways that the bow harp spread in Africa. From Egypt, the harp may have spread south up the Nile through the empire of Cush (c.600 BC - c.350 AD) and in a precursor of the "spoon in the cup" type during the course of the 1st century BC. Millennium reached the south of Uganda, from which the ennanga and their relatives later developed. The "cork in the bottle" type, to which the adungu belongs, developed from instruments that first made their way west from Kush to Lake Chad. Franz Födermayr (1969) found halfway along this route among the Bilia in the retreat area of the Ennedi mountains(in northeastern Chad) the five-string bowed harp krding. Another five-string harp on this route is the Nubian kurbi (also al-bakurbo ) of the Baggara of Darfur, reported in 1972. With the progressive drying out of the savannah, there were population shifts to the south, and this type of harp reached its present distribution area, including northwestern Uganda.

In this diffusion theory, there are some differences between the ancient Egyptian and southern African bowed harps, which have moved away from them in terms of playing technique and construction: Unlike in ancient Egypt, some modern African harpists holds their instrument with his neck away from his body. The ancient Egyptian harps were generally believed to have fixed tuning pegs to keep the strings wrapped around the neck from slipping, but no movable tuning pegs like all contemporary African harps. When and from where the tuning pegs were first introduced is unclear.

The Alur and Acholi also call adungu or adingili a multi-stringed musical bow, which consists of a semicircular curved stick over which a cord is stretched in such a way that three Z-shaped strings with different pitches result. Adingili is a probably onomatopoeic Bantu-Timbrh language word, phonetically connected with timbili for a Cameroonian lamellophone.

According to descriptions from the first half of the 20th century, this musical bow is played by Acholi and Alur girls who place the bow staff on an inverted gourd bowl to amplify the sound. From a musical bow amplified in this way, the developmental path to the bowed harp leads via the intermediate stage of a resonator attached to the semicircular string carrier. The rare Afghan waji, classified inconsistently as a musical bow or bowed harp, has such a wooden resonator equipped with a skin cover, the strings of which are individually stretched.

== Names ==
African harps have many names in different languages and dialects. These include:

- Adeudeu, Uganda and Kenya, Teso people. Arched harp.
- Adungu, Uganda, Alur people. Arched harp.
- Ardin, Mauritania, Moorish women
- Bolo-bogo, Ivory Coast, Senufo people. Single-stringed harp, played with one hand as rhythm instrument, other hand beats resonator as drum
- Bolon, bolombata, West Africa, Manding people; Gambia, Mandinka people; Guinea, Maninka people; Mali, Maninka people. Arched harp; also classed as a harp lute.
- Bonguma, Democratic Republic of the Congo, Balendu people. 5-string harp, horizontal.
- Dilli, Chad, Masa people. 5-string arched harp, horizontal, with tuning pegs. Resonator struck with arm for additional rhythm
- Do, Ivory Coast, Guere people. Angular harp or belly harp, 7 strings strung across triangular frame with calabash resonator.
- Domo, Democratic Republic of Congo, Bari people, Domo people, Mangbetu people, Ndongo people, Ngbele bpeople. Resembles kundi.
- Donnu, Democratic Republic of the Congo, Mangbetu people. Arched harp, 5 strings. May no longer be in use.
- Ekidongo, Ekinongo, Uganda, Nyro people. Arched harp, resembles ennanga. Also 3-string musical bow of Nkole people.
- Ekihato, Uganda, Konjo people. Arched harp.
- Ennanga, Uganda, Ganda people. Arched harp with tuning pegs or tuning rings. Enanga is also a name for a trough zither.
- Entongoli, Uganda, Jopadhola people.
- Galdyama, Chad & Cameroon, Kotogo people. Arched harp, 5 strings, string attached to neck with pegs. Trio of harps of which galyma is smallest and highest pitched. Other two are the direnda and the kolo.

- Direndana, West Africa, Kotoko people/ Same as galdyama (middle sized)/
- Kolo, West Africa, Kotoko people. Same as Galdyama (largest size, lowest notes)

- Gonfi, Gabon, Pygmy people. 8-string arched harp.
- Gundi, Chad & Cameroon, Kotoko people. 8-string arched harp.
- Juru, Ivory Coast, Baule people. Both arched harp, belly harp, musical bow. Bow with 6 strings, calabash resonator held to stomach.
- Kimasa, Uganda, Soga people. Arched harp, resembles ennanga.
- Kinanga, Uganda, Konjo people.
- Kinde, Chad, Barma people. arched harp, 5 strings, tuning pegs.
- Kindingding, Cameroon, Fali people. Arched harp, 5 strings, tuning pegs, boat shaped resonator.
- Komba, Democratic Republic of the Congo, Budu people. Arched harp, resembles kundi
- Kondu, Democratic Republic of the Congo, Zande people. Arched harp.
- Kunda, Democratic Republic of the Congo, Mangbetu people. Arched harp, resembles kundi.
- Kundé, Chad, Sara Gambaye people. Arched harp, 6 strings. Can be used instead of human voice to transmit messages.
- Kundi, Democratic Republic of the Congo & Central African Republic. Arched harp, related to ngombi. Neck is sometimes arched, sometimes angular.
- Kundu, Democratic Republic of the Congo. Arched harp.
- Kunnee 5-string arched harp, Chad, Gula people with the end opposite the neck flat. Strings are attached to neck with pegs.
- Kurbi, Sudan, Nubian people. 5-strings played with left hand, resonator is drummed with right hand.
- Loma, Liberia. Angular harp.
- Loterokuma, Uganda, Acholi people. Arched harp, resembles ennanga.
- Maringa, Democratic Republic of the Congo, Bajanje people. Arched harp, resembles kundi.*Nandomo, Democratic Republic of the Congo, Mangbetu people. Arched harp, resembles kundi.
- Nanga, Democratic Republic of the Congo, Azande people, Mangbetu people.
- Nango, Uganda, Ganda people. 8-string harp.
- Nedomu, neduma, Democratic Republic of the Congo, Mangbetu people and Meje people. Arched harp, resembles kundi.
- Ngombi, Cameroon and Central African Republic and Gabon. Arched harp, 8-10 strings. Users include Ngbaka people, Fang people, Kele people, Tsogo people, Miene people. Related or same as gonfi, ngonfi, ombi, wombi.
- Ngombo, Gabon, Tsogo people. Arched harp, 8 strings, vertical.
- Ngonfi, Gabon, Manango people. Arched harp, 8 strings.
- Nkundi, Democratic Republic of the Congo, Zande people, Bondo people, Bari people. Arched harp, resembles kundi.
- Ntongoni, Uganda, Ganda people, Soga people. Horizontal harp, 6 strings.
- Ombi, Gabon, Fang people, Pahuin people. Arched harp, 8 strings. Related to or same as ngombi.
- Opuk agoya, Uganda, Acholi people. Arched harp, resembles ennanga.
- Ore, Uganda, Madi people. Arched harp, resembles ennanga.
- Orodo, Uganda, Madi people. Arched harp, resembles ennanga.
- Otongoli, Uganda, Gwere people. Arched harp, resembles ennanga.
- Ougdyé, African harp.
- Seto, Democratic Republic of the Congo, Ngbaka people. Resembles kundi.
- Tongoli, Uganda, Dhola people. 8-string harp.
- Tum, Uganda, Lango people, Labwor people. Arched harp, resembles ennanga.
- Wombi, Gabon, Fang people. Arched harp, 8 strings.
- Yom biBagirmi, Nigeria, Birom people. Arched harp, 6-7 strings.

== See also ==
- African music
- Congolese second frand The 5 cent banknote has a Zande harp on its reverse.
- Gravikord
- Kafir harp
- Kora
