= Belly harp =

Plucked string instrument

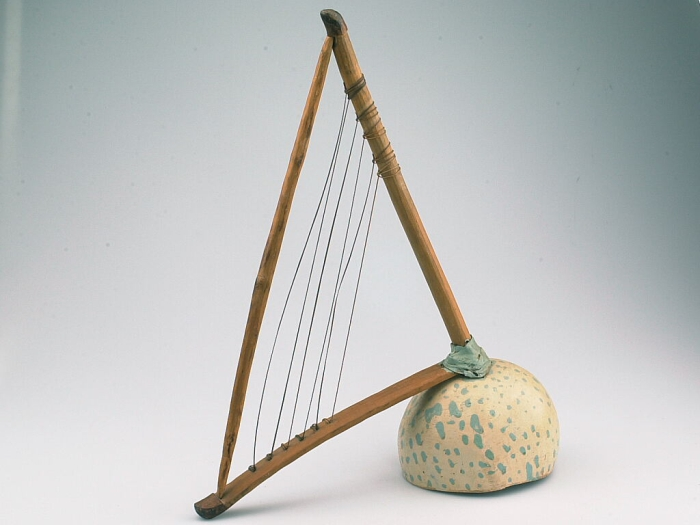
A loma belly harp, played by the Crau, Crau, Krao, Krawi, Kru, Nana peoples of West Africa. This is also a frame zither.

The belly harp is a musical instrument found in West Africa (including Nigeria and Liberia) which is a musical bow with a gourd resonator which is held against the body.

== Recordings ==
- Belly Harp. Folk Music of Liberia, Folkways FE 4465 (Side ll, band 3)
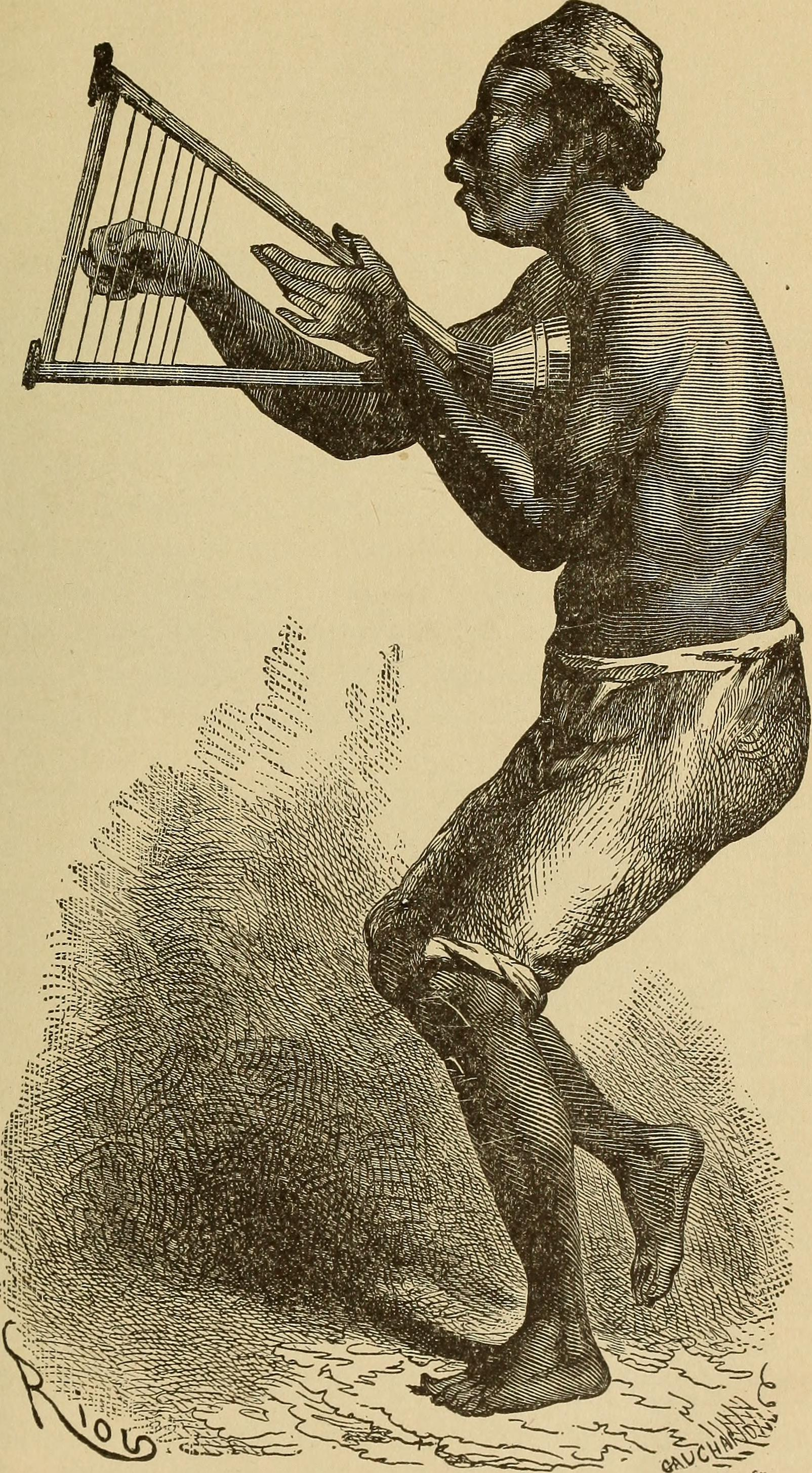
Belly harp or frame zither, 1894
