= Timbrh =

Lamellophone

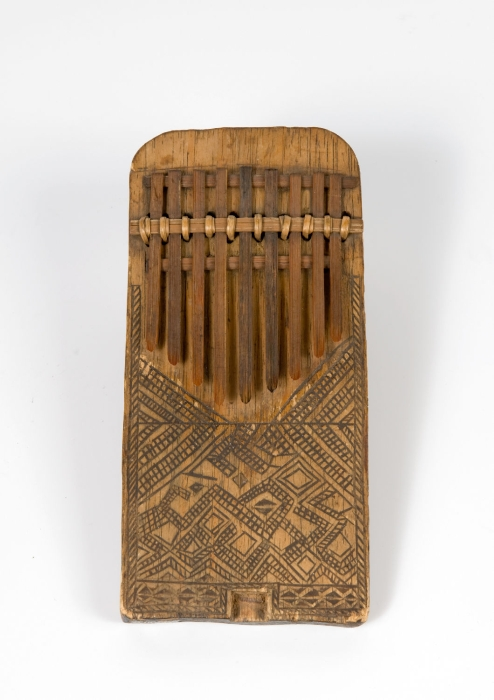
Timbrh in National Museum of World Cultures

Timbrh (pronounced tim-BER) is an instrument belonging in lamellophone class, traditional to the Mambila people of Cameroon. The wooden base are generally made of thin woods or hollow raffia palm stems. The lamellas of timbrh, which can be in numbers up to 20, consists of hard leaf veins of raffia palms. It also features a triangular soundholes. In a typical dance accompaniment ensemble, three to four timbrh play together. A variant with a smaller box is only used as a solo. In an older, now obsolete version of the timbrh, the lamellae were attached to two parallel connected raffia leaf ribs cut in half.

== Origin and Distribution ==
Lamellophones are from sub-Saharan Africa and have been distributed out of the continent through African cultural export. Lamellophones are divided into five basic types according to the shape of the lamellar carrier and resonator:

1. rectangular board with and without an external resonator, which almost always consists of a gourd half-shell,

2. shell-shaped lamellar carrier,

3. bell-shaped lamellar carrier,

4. box-shaped lamina and

5. raft-shaped or irregularly shaped lamina, each with or without a separate resonator.

It is also possible to classify the lamellophones according to the social and cultural context or to its regions of distribution.
