= Ngombi =

Central African arched harp

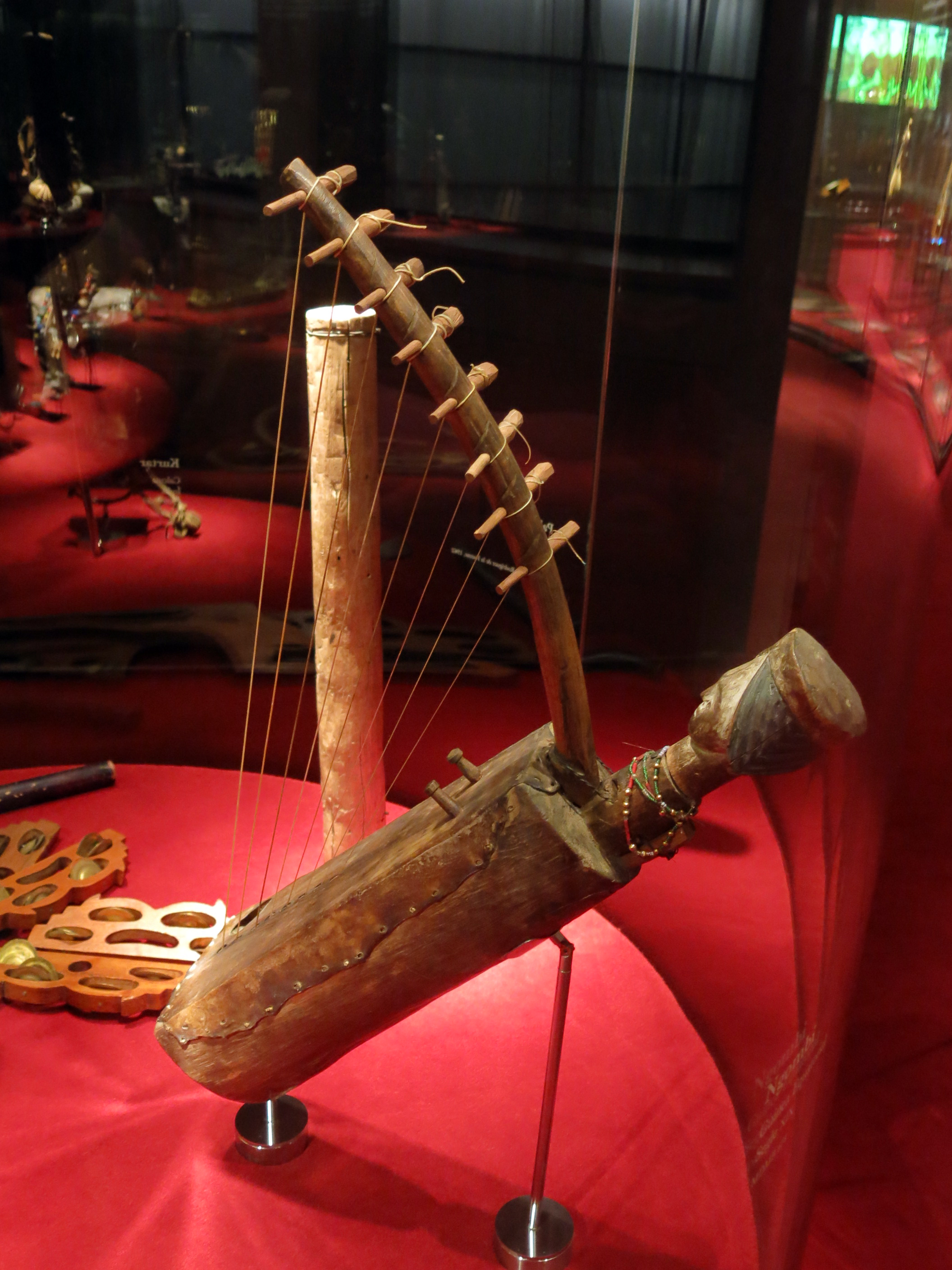
Ngombi from Equatorial Guinea; on display at the Museu de la Música de Barcelona.

The ngombi is a traditional musical instrument from Central Africa.

== History ==
It is an arched harp.

== Countries ==
- Central African Republic
- Equatorial Guinea
- Republic of Congo
- Gabon
