= List of musical instruments by Hornbostel–Sachs number: 322.11 =

This is a list of musical instruments by Hornbostel-Sachs number, covering those instruments that are classified under 322.11 under that system. These instruments may be known as arched harps. These are instruments in which one or more strings produce sound by vibrating, and where the string carrier and resonator are physically united, with strings at right angles to the sound table, no pillar and a neck that curves away from the resonator. The arched harp is probably an evolution of the musical bow, distinguished by the addition of strings and the fusion of the string holder and the soundbox.

Arched harps are found in Southeast Asia, East Africa, and elsewhere, and are historically strongly associated with Ancient Egypt and India. Two categories of arched harps exist, though are not distinguished in the Hornbostel-Sachs system: those in which only one stick constitutes both the neck and the string holder of the instrument and those in which two separate sticks are used. The oldest harps of Egypt used the one stick construction, but this later changed to two sticks, which is now also used in the Burmese saung gauk and many other forms.

The arched harp saung gauk is seen as a national instrument of Myanmar, and its history there dates back centuries. In the music of India, arched harps are strongly associated with Buddhism, and are frequently depicted in images of Buddhist deities and were formerly played in the royal courts of Buddhist dynasties. The arched harp receded in prominence in India after the rise of Hinduism in that country, and the instrument's modern presence in India is apparently limited to the Pardhan people of Madhya Pradesh.

The arched harps of Egypt, sub-Saharan Africa and Myanmar share a few features, including a stick to which each string is attached at one end and a piece of skin with a cavity underneath it, attached to the stick. However, it can not be conclusively determined that these instruments are related to each other. The similarities between the arched harps of Southeast Asia and East Africa are part of a broad group of cultural relations, and the distribution of arched harps in Africa follows roughly the route by which the yam apparently spread across the continent after being introduced from Indonesia. The Egyptian shoulder harp is also the earliest known instrument to have soundholes.

3: Instruments in which sound is produced by one or more vibrating strings (chordophones, string instruments).

32: Instruments in which the resonator and string bearer are physically united and can not be separated without destroying the instrument

322: Instrument whose strings are at right angles to the sound table, such that a line between the lower tips of the strings would point at the neck (harps)

322.1: Instrument without a pillar (open harps)

322.11: Instrument has a neck that curves away from the resonator (arched harp)

These instruments may be classified with a suffix, based on how the strings are caused to vibrate.

- 4: Hammers or beaters
- 5: Bare hands and fingers
- 6: Plectrum
- 7: Bowing
  - 71: Using a bow
  - 72: Using a wheel
  - 73: Using a ribbon
- 8: Keyboard
- 9: Using a mechanical drive

== List ==
Instrument	Tradition	Hornbostel–Sachs classification	Description
adeudeu	Kenya	322.11	Arched harp
African harp	multiple cultures including Egypt	322.11	Arched harp
ennanga	Uganda	322.11	Arched harp
Kafir Harp	Music of northern Afghanistan, Nuristan Province	322.11	Arched harp
ladle harp	Ancient Egypt	322.11	Ladle-shaped arched harp
Pagan harp	Pagan Kingdom	322.11	Arched harp with a thick and blunt neck, only slightly curved
Pardhan harp kidim-baja, gudum-baja (both derogatory), bin-baja	Pardhan of India	322.11	Arched harp made from a single stick, with five strings, played with a plectrum and attached to a sawtooth-shaped carrier, with one soundhole and a waisted body
Pin	Cambodia	322.11	
Pyu harp	Pyu city-states	322.11	Fourteen-stringed arched harp with an outward curving neck and a bird or phoenix carved on the apex
saung-gauk	Myanmar	322.11	Arched harp with a curving neck and large soundholes, made from two sticks
shoulder harp	Ancient Egypt	322.11	Arched harp with a boat-shaped hollow body surrounded by a skin membrane, with ten soundholes and traversed and punctured by one or two sticks to which the string is attached;
shovel harp	Ancient Egypt	322.11	Shovel-shaped arched harp
vina	Ancient India	322.11	Arched harp (vina now refers to a stick zither, 311.222)
Yazh	Ancient India	322.11	Arched harp 311.222)
