= Yazh =

Musical instrument

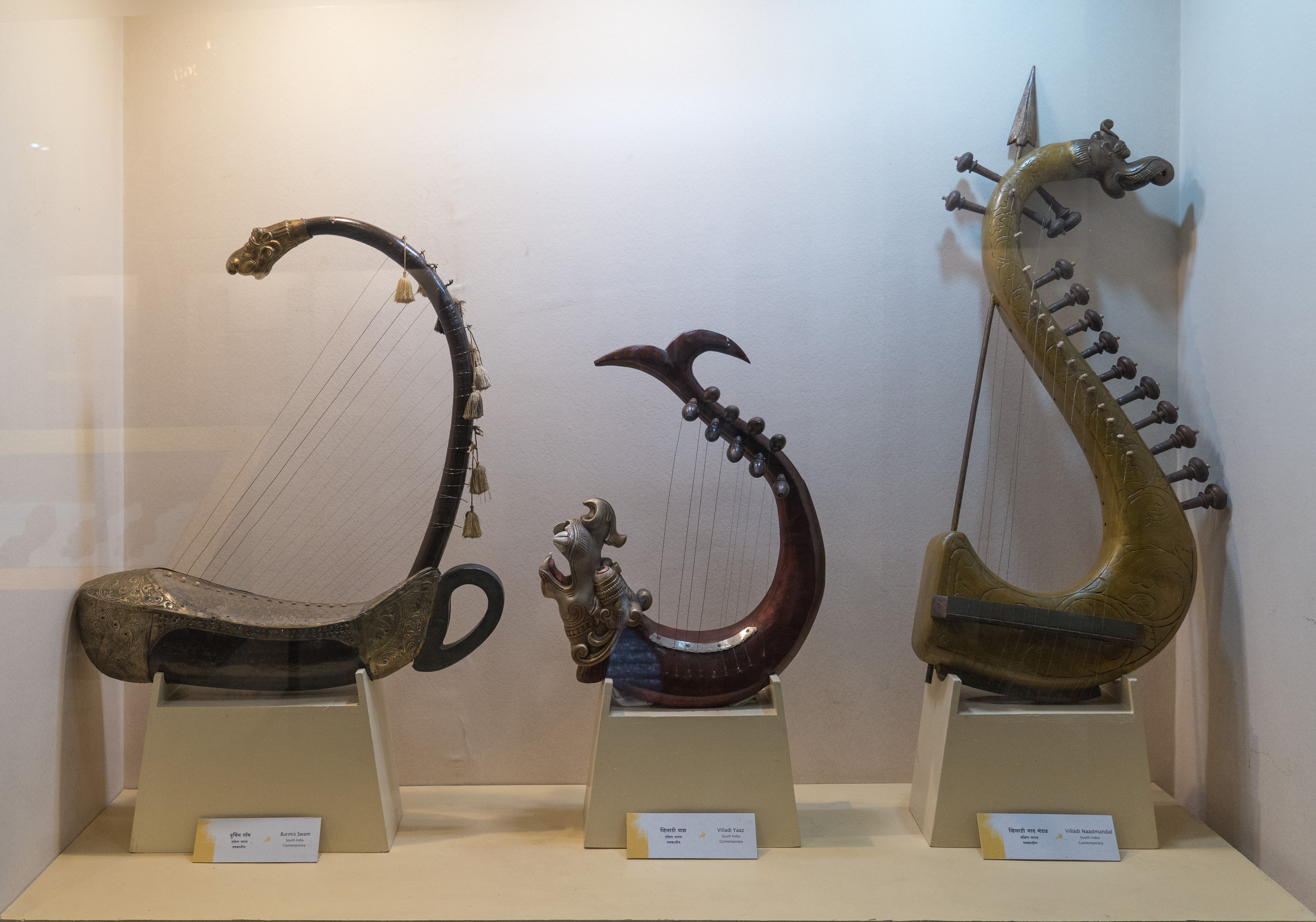
- Three recreations of historical harps: Villadi Yaaz (center), Burmis Swam (left), Villadi Naadmandal (right).
- Classification: String instrument
- Hornbostel–Sachs classification: 322.11 (arched harp)

Related instruments
- African harp; Pin (Cambodian harp); Saung (Burmese harp); harp-style Vina

Musicians
- Tharun Sekar

Builders
- Tharun Sekar

The yazh (Tamil: யாழ், also transliterated yāḻ, pronounced [jaːɻ]) is a harp used in ancient Tamil music. It was strung with gut strings that ran from a curved ebony neck to a boat or trough-shaped resonator, the opening of which was covered with skin for a soundboard. At the resonator the strings were attached to a string-bar or tuning bar with holes for strings that laid beneath of the soundboard and protruded through. The neck may also have been covered in hide.

The arched harp was used in India since at least the 2nd century B.C.E., when a woman was sculpted with the instrument in a Buddhist artwork at Bhārut. Both the Indian harp-style veena and the Tamil yazh declined starting in about the 7th century C.E., as stick-zither style veenas rose to prominence.

While use of the instrument died out in centuries past, artworks have preserved some knowledge of what the instruments looked like. Luthiers have begun to recreate the instrument.

== Characteristics ==
The instruments were built between 1 and 3 feet tall. Strings made of goat intestine were stretched and shaped to differing thicknesses for different notes. Bodies were carved from local woods, including emmaram (red wood) or pala maram (jackfruit) wood, and today red cedar is used. Soundboards were made of goatskin, glued to the body with a paste made of tamarind seeds. The sound bar beneath the soundboard, which the strings anchor to, was glued to the instrument's body with a lacquer called Arakku.

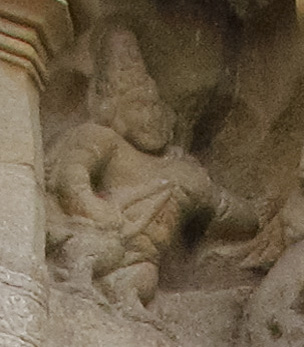
Kinnara playing a yazh, Kailasanathar Temple in Kanchipuram, India, ca. 8th century C.E.

Harps are tuned to musical scales, with each string being tuned to one note in the scale. According to literature, Tamil land was divided into five regions, each having its own scale (Paan) and variant of the instrument.

The Tamil poet Thiruvalluvar mentions yazh in his work Thirukkural. Many major Tamil classical literary masterpieces written during Sangam period have mentioned the yazh. Silappatikaram, written by a Tamil Chera prince Ilango Adigal, mentions four kinds of yazhs:

- Peri yazh – 21-29 strings – large yazh
- Makara yazh – 19 strings – makara yazh
- Cakota yazh – 14 strings
- Cenkotti yazh – 7 strings

The Tamil book Perumpāṇāṟṟuppaṭai says the strings of a yazh should not have any twists in them. Other Tamil literature which have mentions on yazh are Seevaga Sindhamani and Periya Puranam. In modern times Swami Vipulananda has written a book of scientific research in Tamil called the Yazh Nool, detailing 6 different yazh harps.

=== Body shape ===
The instrument may have a relationship with the mythological yali, the word for which (யாழி) is linguistically similar to the word for this arched harp (முகம்). Whatever relationship the words may or may not have linguistically, some researchers believe the mythological yali was carved into the tip of the yazh harp's neck. The relationship between a stringed instrument and the yali is not limited to this Tamil instrument, but also was mentioned by Śārṅgadeva in his Sangita Ratnakara as a feature of the ekatantri stick-zither veena. The modern Saraswati veena retains this feature.

Other types of yazh are:

- Mayil Yazh – "resembling a peacock"
- Vil Yazh – "shaped like a bow"

The animal used in creating the instrument has an effect on its sound, affecting the instrument's dimensions which changes its sound. The shapes are both culturally aesthetic and lend themselves to incorporating the golden ratio curve into the arch of the instrument.

== Literature ==
There is a city named for the yazh in the story of its founding, Jaffna, known in Tamil as Yazhpanam. A Sri Lankan Tamil legend recounts that a blind man Panan played on the Yazh so beautiful that he was given land from a king, which he named after himself, literally meaning "town of harper".

Not only seen in literature, Yazh are found in sculptures in the Darasuram and Thirumayam temples in Tamil Nadu and also in Amaravathi village, Guntur district.

The yazh was played in Madurai Meenakshi Amman Temple in early centuries. It was mentioned in Shaiva Thirumurai 11th Pathigam. It was also played by the musician and poet Panapathirar (Tamil: பாணபத்திரர்) who is mentioned in religious devotional stories.

== Gallery ==
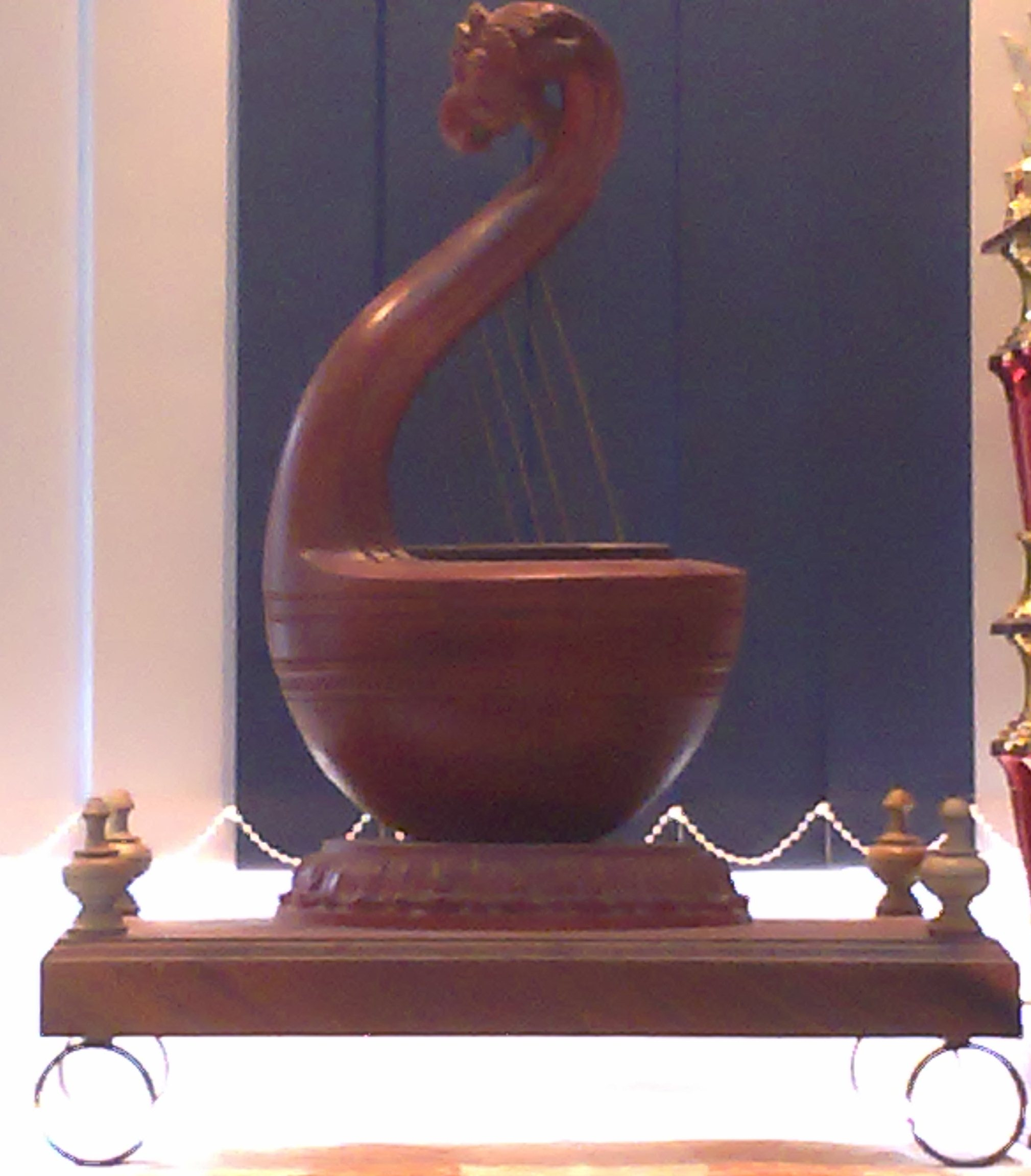
Modern reproduction of a Yazh, an instrument used in Ancient Tamil music. This reproduction has a yali head carved into the curved neck.

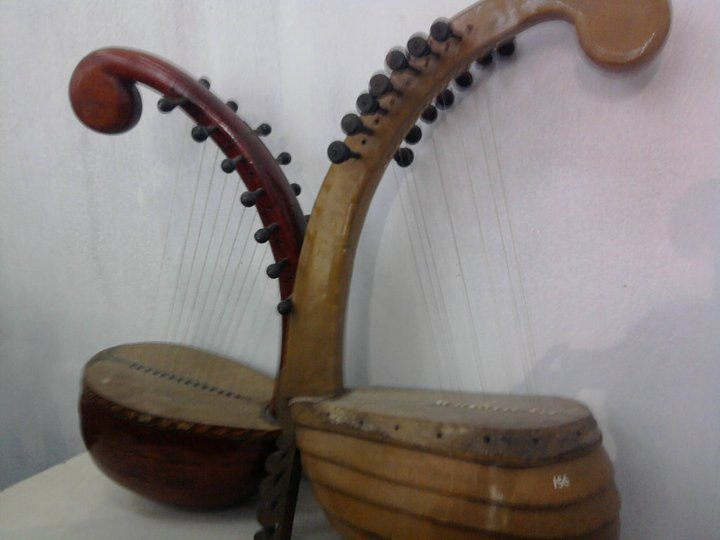
Modern recreations of the yazh/yal

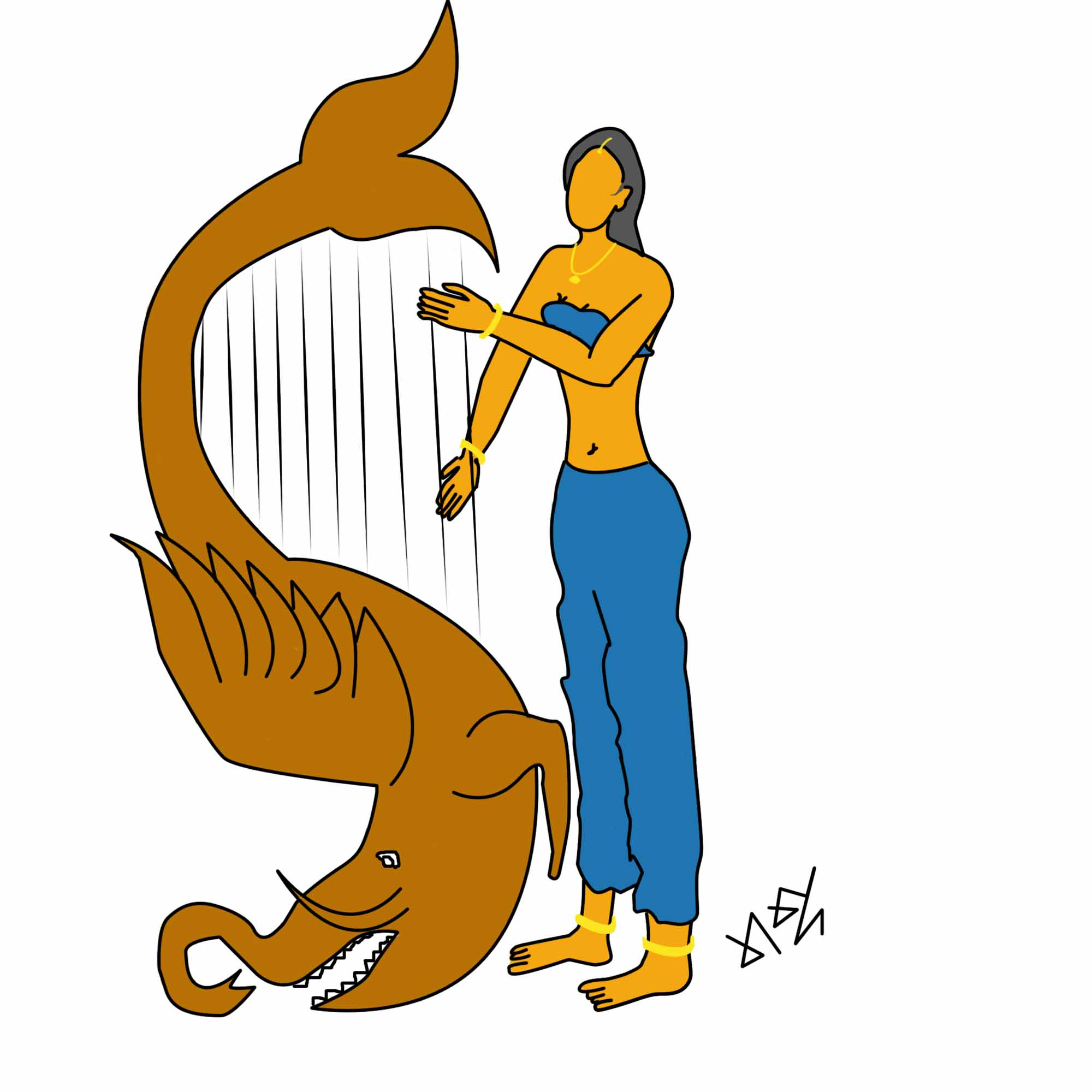
Modern illustration of Makara yal (Tamil: மகரயாழ்).

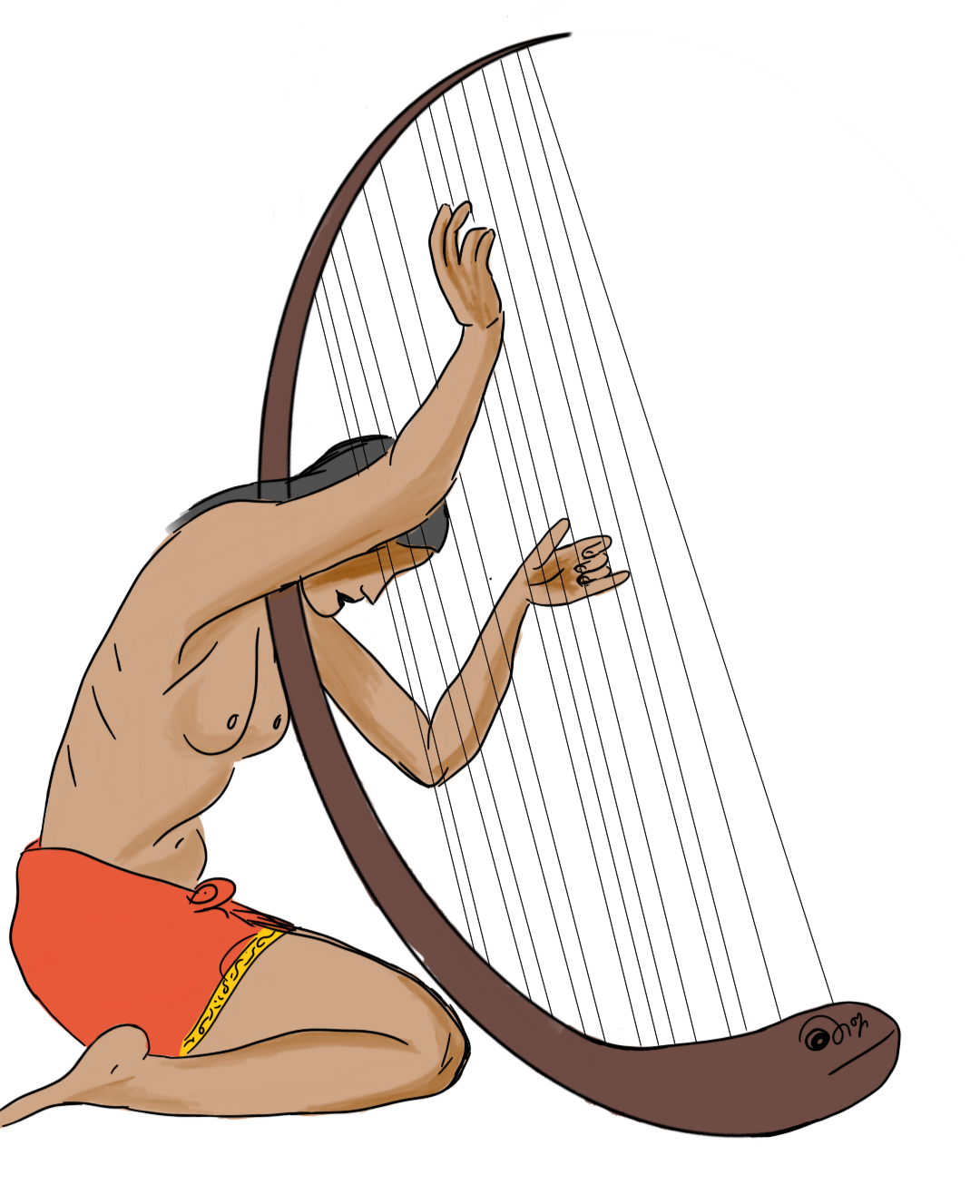
Woman playing a yal.

Virkodi yazh or vil yazh. A music theory proposes that a hunters bow was inspiration for the first stringed instruments in India. This is from Tamil Nadu.
