= A. M. A. Azeez =

Ceylonese civil servant, educator and social worker

Senator A. M. A. Azeez MBE CCS
- ஏ. எம். ஏ. அஸீஸ்

Member of the Senate of Ceylon
- In office June 1952 – March 1963
- Preceded by: Mohamed Macan Markar

Personal details
- Born: 4 October 1911 Vannarpannai, Ceylon
- Died: 24 November 1973 (aged 62) Colombo, Sri Lanka
- Education: Ceylon University College
- Profession: Civil servant
- Ethnicity: Sri Lankan Moor

Aboobucker Mohamed Abdul Azeez (Tamil: ஏ. எம். ஏ. அஸீஸ்; 4 October 1911 – 24 November 1973) was a Ceylonese civil servant, educator, social worker and member of the Senate of Ceylon.

== Early life and family ==
Azeez was born on 4 October 1911 in Vannarpannai in northern Ceylon. He was the son of S. M. Aboobucker, a lawyer, member of Jaffna Urban Council and president of the All Ceylon Muslim League. Azeez's paternal uncle Asena Lebbe Alim Pulavar was a Tamil scholar, poet and expert in Arabic-Tamil. Azeez was educated at Allapichai Quran Madrasa in Vannarpannai (1916), Mohammadiya Mixed Tamil School in Vannarpannai (1917–20), R. K. M. Vaitheeswara Vidyalayam (1921-23) and Jaffna Hindu College (1923–28). After school he spent a year at Saint Joseph's College, Colombo (1928–29) before joining the Ceylon University College in 1929, graduating in 1933 with B.A. degree in history. He then joined St Catharine's College, Cambridge in 1934 on a Ceylon Government University Scholarship in Arts. Before he had left Ceylon Azeez had sat the Ceylon Civil Service (CCS) examination. Whilst at Cambridge he was informed in October 1934 that he had passed the CCS examination and so returned to Ceylon in February 1935 after just one term at Cambridge. He was reputedly the first Muslim to enter the CCS.

Azeez married Ummu Kuluthum Ismail in October 1936. They had a daughter (Marina Zulficar) and two sons (Mohamed Ali and Mohamed Iqbal).

== Career ==
Azeez commenced his civil service career as a cadet in 1935. He worked at the Assistant Government Agent (AGA)'s offices in Kandy and Matale, as Administrative Secretary at the Department of Medical and Sanitary Services and Secretary to the Minister of Health. He was working as an Additional Landing Surveyor in the Customs Department when, in April 1942, he was appointed AGA at the emergency Kachcheri established in Kalmunai to tackle the acute shortage of food in Ceylon. Azeez helped landless Muslims in eastern Ceylon become landed farmers and transformed the Eastern Province became the granary of Ceylon. Whilst in Kalmunai Azeez formed close friendships with poet Abdul Cader Lebbe from Kattankudy and scholar Swami Vipulananda from Karaitivu. Azeez and others founded the Kalmunai Muslim Educational Society (KMES) in 1942 to establish an English medium school which also taught Arabic and Tamil, and to provide scholarships for students from the district. He was transferred back to Colombo in January 1944 to be a Deputy Food Controller before being appointed AGA at Kandy in February 1944. He was elected president of the Kandy Muslim Association which changed its name to the Kandy Young Men's Muslim Association following suggestion by Azeez. He was transferred back to Colombo in 1945 to be an Information Officer. Azeez was later Additional Controller of Establishments at the Treasury, Assistant Commissioner of Parliamentary Elections (1947) and Assistant Secretary at the Ministry of Health and Local Government (1948).

Whilst in Kandy Azeez observed high levels of poverty and illiteracy among Muslims and that many Muslim students did not stay in education due to poverty. In September 1944 Azeez started canvassing support for the formation of the Ceylon Muslim Scholarship Fund (CMSF) which was help Muslim students progress through the education system and into the professions and other senior positions. The KMES was merged into the CMSF which was inaugurated on 19 May 1945 at the Library Hall of Zahira College, Colombo. Azeez became the CMSF's Chairman of the Committee of Management, a position he held until 1955.

T. B. Jayah, principal of Zahira College, was elected to Parliament at the 1947 parliamentary election and was appointed to the Cabinet. A reluctant Azeez was persuaded to replace Jayah, giving up his civil service career and becoming principal of Zahira College in August 1948. He was principal for 13 years, resigning in December 1961 when the college was taken over by the government.

There were several independent Young Men's Muslim Association (YMMA) in Ceylon. On 2 April 1950 the YMMAs of Aluthkade, Central, Kuruwe Street, Maligawatte and Mutwal met at Zahira College under the chairmanship of Azeez and unanimously decided to establish the All Ceylon Young Men's Muslim Association Conference (ACYMMAC) bring to existing YMMAs under one umbrella group. Delegates from seventeen YMMAs met at Zahira College on 30 April 1950 and inaugurated the ACYMMAC with Azeez as its president. He was president for three years.

Azeez was a member of the United National Party (UNP) and was elected to its working committee in 1952. He was appointed to the Senate of Ceylon in 1952 on the recommendation of Prime Minister Dudley Senanayake. Azeez opposed the Sinhala Only Act and resigned from the UNP in June 1956 due to its support for the Act. Azeez resigned from the Senate in March 1963 after being appointed to the Public Service Commission.

Azeez was made a Member of the Order of the British Empire for his services to the community in 1952. (Note: Another source states that Azeez was made MBE in 1951.) He was a member of the court, council and senate of the University of Ceylon. He was president of the All Ceylon Union of Teachers and the Headmasters' Conference.

Azeez died on 24 November 1973 in Colombo. (Note: Another source gives Azeez's date of death as 23 November 1973.) He was posthumously awarded a Doctorate of Letters by the University of Jaffna at its first convocation in 1980. A commemorative 75 cents stamp was issued in 1986. He was named one of the 100 Great Muslim Leaders of the 20th Century by the Institute of Objective Studies, India.
