= Ancient veena =

Musical instrument

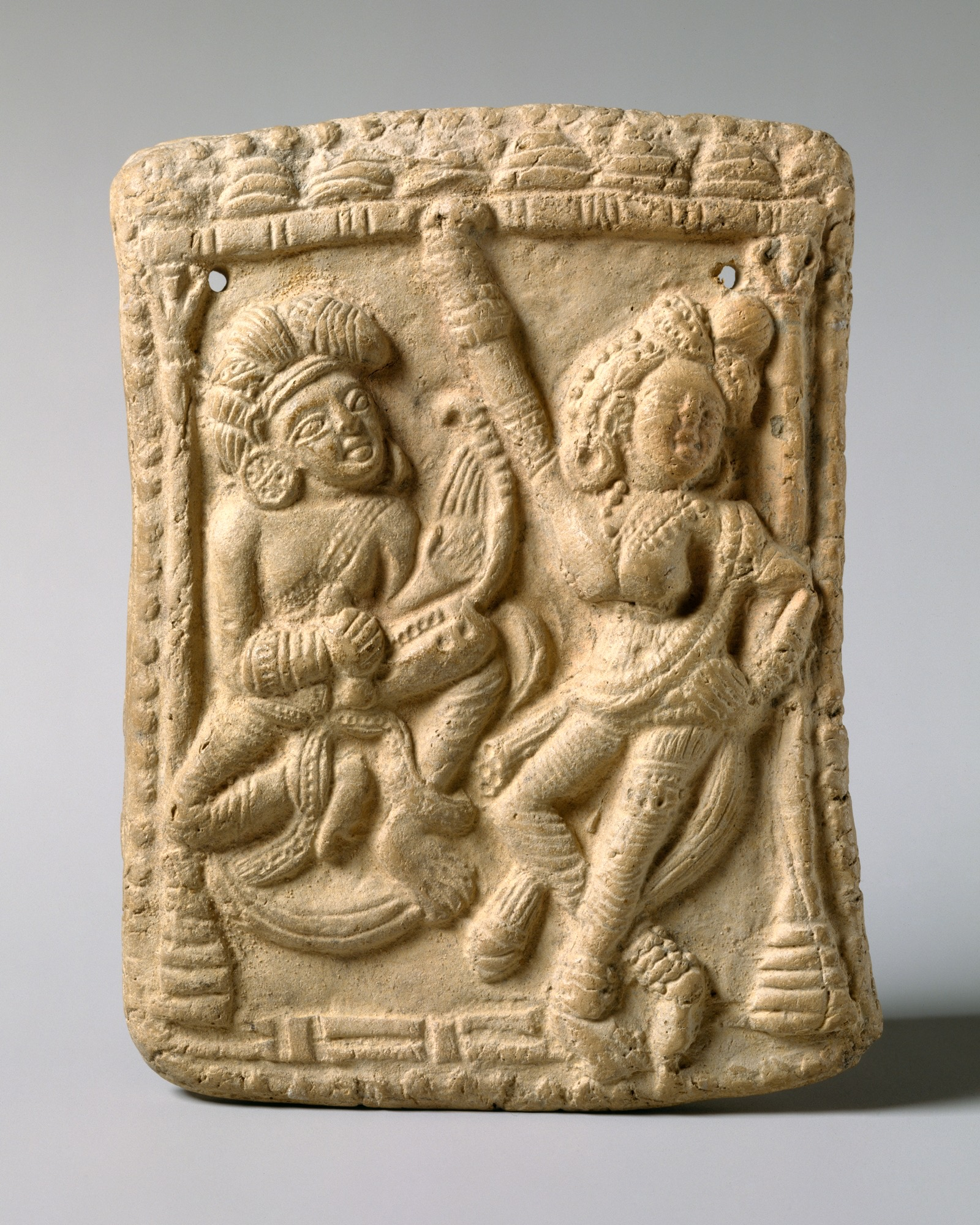
Plaque with a Dancer and a Vina Player 1st century B.C.

The ancient veena is an early Indian arched harp, not to be confused with the modern Indian veena which is a type of lute or stick zither. Names of specific forms of the arched harp include the chitra vīṇā with seven strings, the vipanchi vīṇā with nine strings and the mattakokila vīṇā a harp or possibly board zither with 21 strings.

The instrument is attested on a gold coin of the Gupta Empire from the mid-300s CE. The instrument was also illustrated in the oldest known Saraswati-like relief carvings, from Buddhist archaeological sites dated to 200 BCE, where she holds a harp-style veena.

== Generic meaning of veena ==
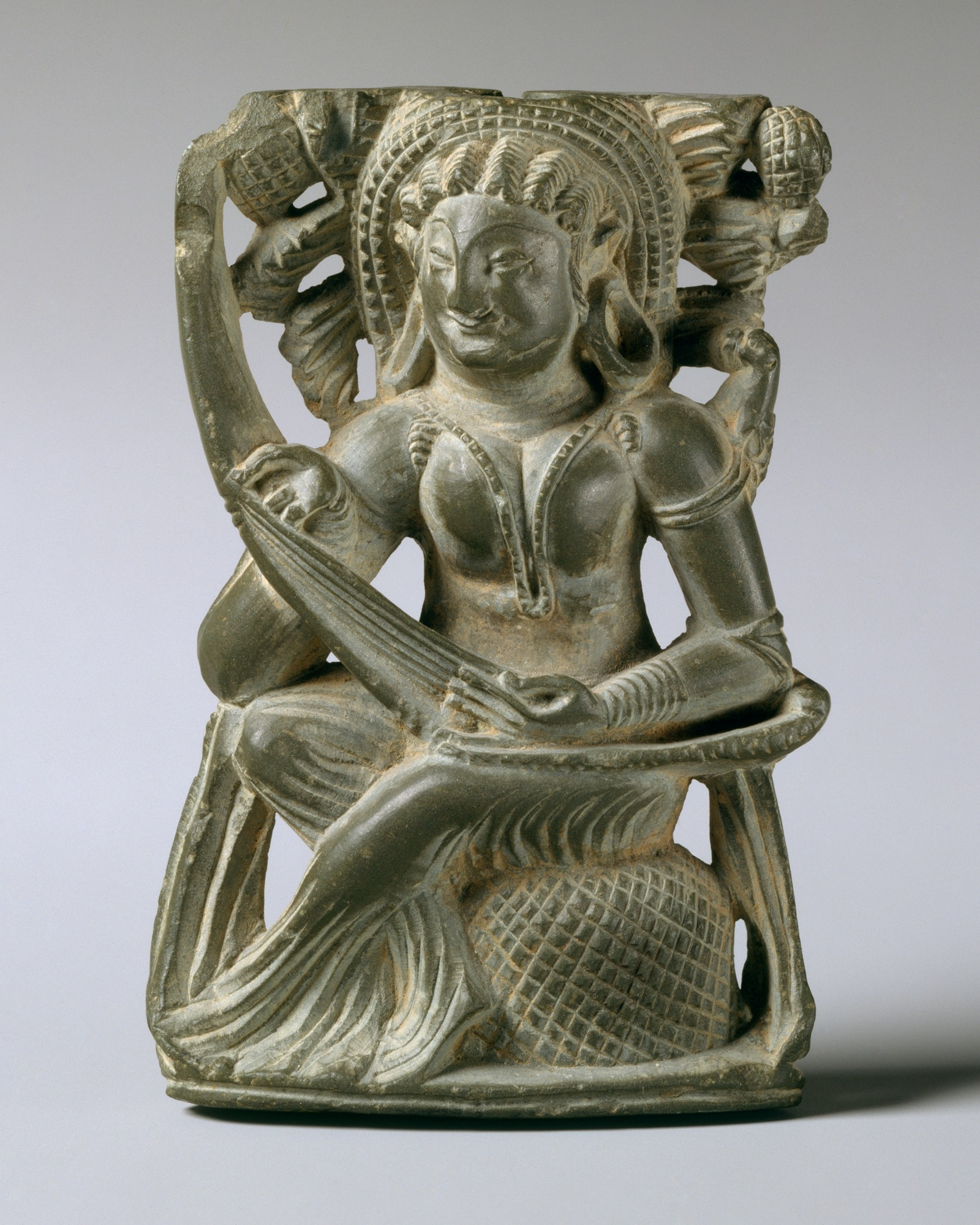
Carved decoration from a hand-mirror's handle, depicting a woman playing the vina, 6th–7th century.

The Sanskrit word veena (वीणा vīṇā) which is attested already in the Rigveda has designated in the course of Indian history a variety of instruments of various types, as it is a generic term for all kinds of string instruments, just as the Tamil word yazh (யாழ் yaaḻ). In the last centuries and today the instruments designated under the designation veena of which there are several kinds, have tended to be mostly instruments of the lute or cithar type, and recently the word was even applied to modified Western guitars. But the early veenas could be plucked string instruments of any type.

== Prehistoric veena ==
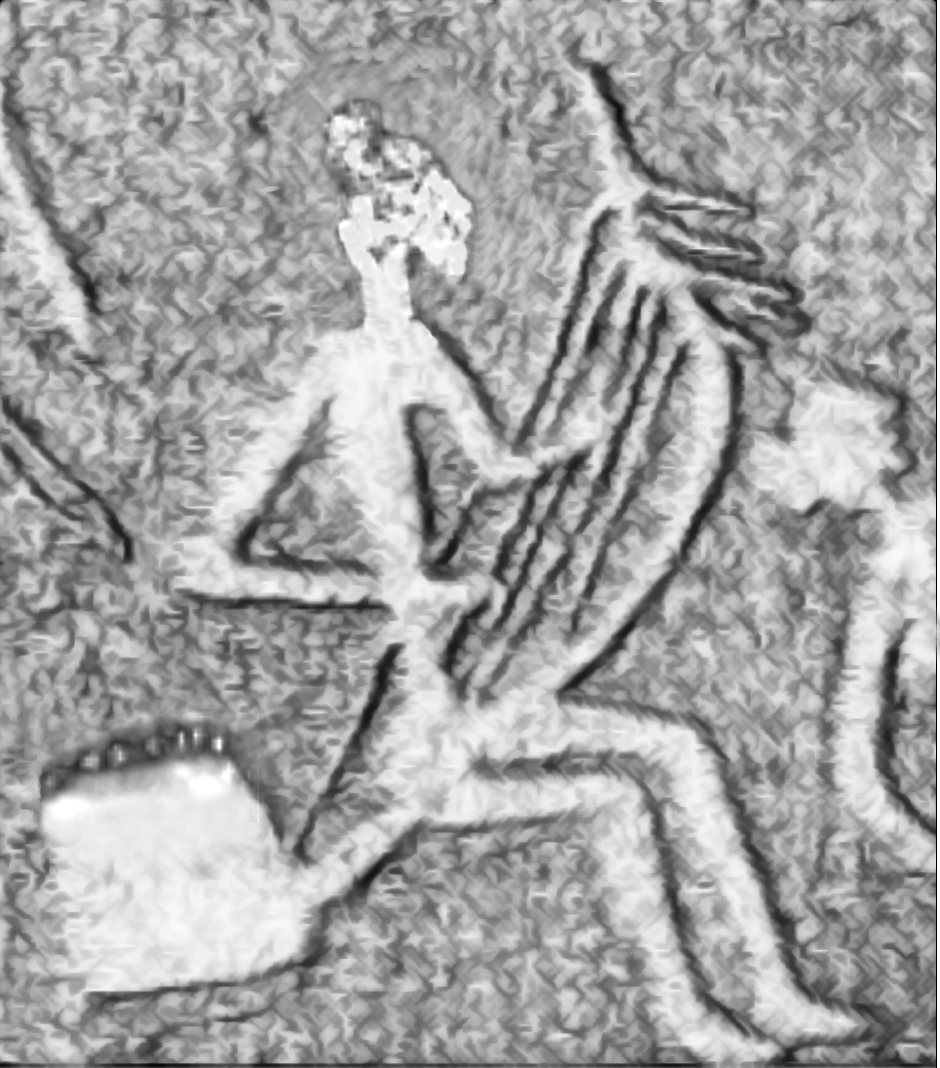
Rock painting at Nimbu bhoj, Pachmarhi, India, date uncertain, possibly 2nd millennium B.C. - 1st millennium B.C.. Bronze Age harper playing a bow harp; the resonator for the harp is the box on its end.

Located in the central Indian state of Madhya Pradesh, the rock caves of Bhimbetka have preserved paintings dating from the Mesolithic (older than 5000 BC) to historical times. In addition to numerous depictions of animals, there are scenes from the "late Bronze Age and Iron Age" of ritual dances with harpists and standing drummers. According to the descriptions in the Vedas, the same instrumentation as in Choga Mish—bowed harp, flute, drum and song—was used in the 1st millennium B.C.in ancient India to accompany dancers.

The most common Sanskrit term for bowed harps was vina. Literary evidence is Brahmanas (before 6th century B.C.), according to which the harp was said to have had "a hundred strings" (called satatantri). In the first centuries A.D., stick zithers and long-necked lutes appeared under the name vina, while towards the end of the 1st millennium the bowed harp disappeared from India. They have only survived on the fringes of Indian cultural influence. Two examples: the saung gauk is best known in Myanmar, while the Kafir harp or waji has become rare in its retreat in north-eastern Afghanistan.

== Early Gupta vina ==
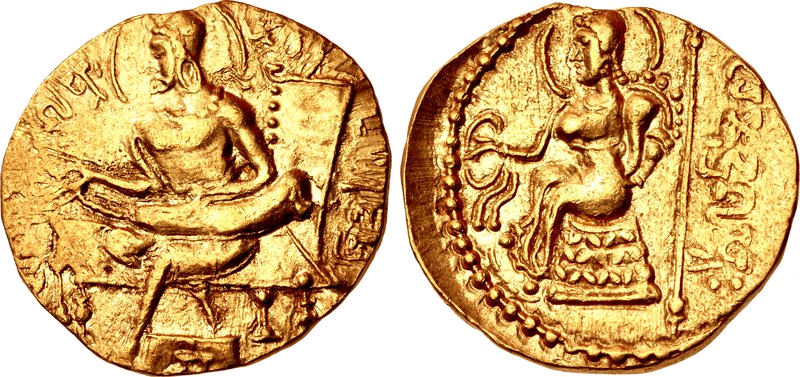
Coin ca. 335-380 CE. (Front side) Samudragupta seated left on a low couch or throne, playing veena set on his knees. (Reverse side) Lakshmi seated left on wicker stool, holding diadem and cornucopia.

One of early veenas used in India from early times, until the Gupta period and later (this is probably the instrument referred to as veenaa in a chapter of the Nāṭyaśāstra dealing with instrumental music) was an instrument of the type of the harp and more precisely of the arched harp. It was played with the strings being kept parallel to the body of the player, with both hands plucking the strings, as shown on Samudragupta's gold coins It is not possible to tell exactly the number of strings of the instrument on the coin, but descriptions in early literary sources of an ancient instrument called the saptatantree veenaa (7-string veenaa) seem to coincide generally with the type of instrument represented on the coin. In the Nāṭyaśāstra this 7-string veena (played with the fingers, as opposed to the 9-string vipanchi played with a plectrum) is called a citra.

The depiction of king Samudragupta holding such an instrument on his gold coins testifies of the popularity of the instrument, and also of the interest in music and the arts of a king who was also one of the greatest military conquerors in Indian history.

== Descendants ==
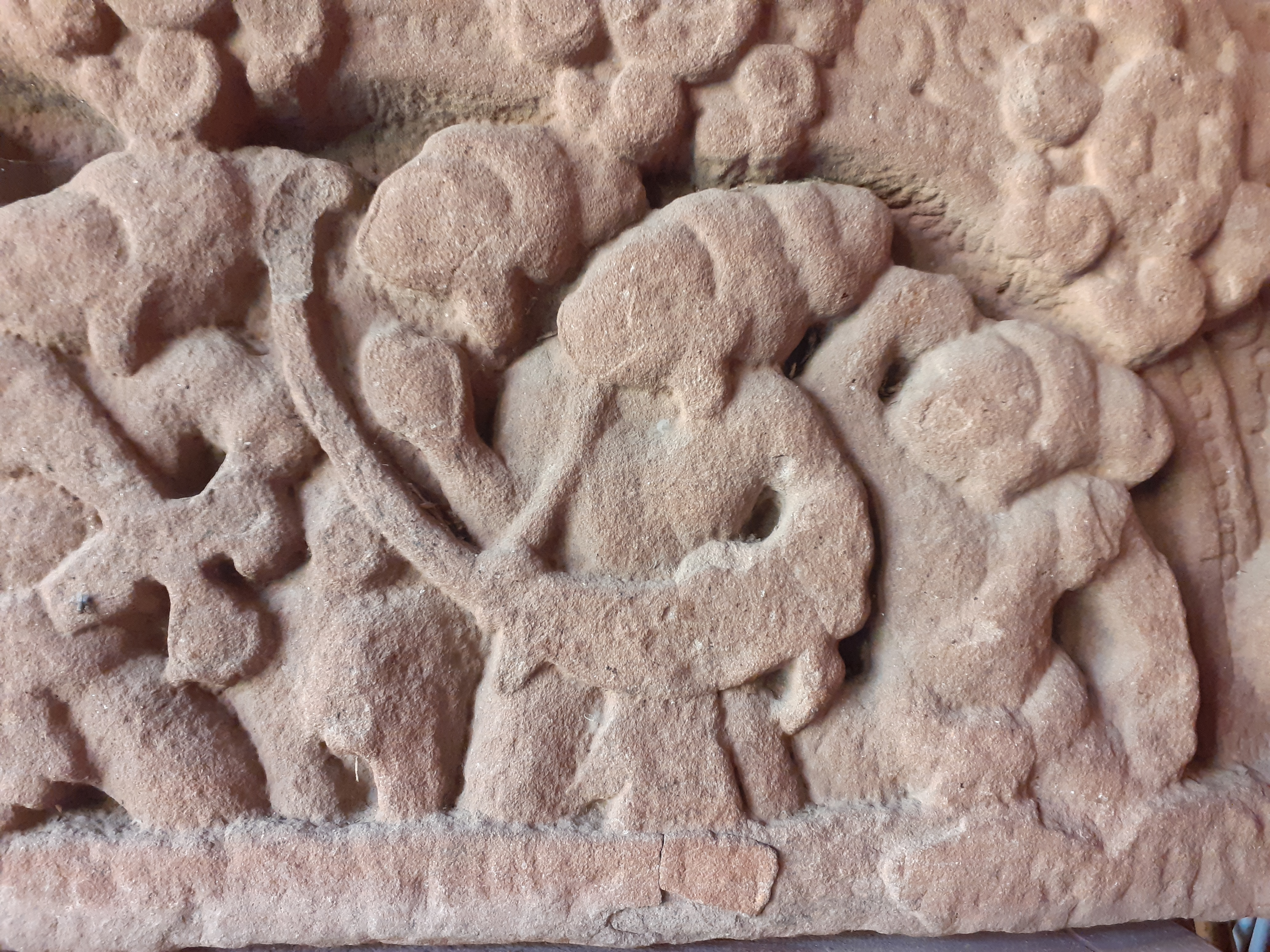
7th century Khmer depiction of harp (pin). National Museum of Cambodia

From India this type of instrument was introduced into Burma at an early period (by the 8th century CE and possibly as early as 500 CE, where, while instruments of this type have disappeared from India itself, it is still played, generally with 15 strings, under the name of saung (known in the West also as the Burmese harp).

The Cambodians have recreated their ancient harp, the pin. The instrument appeared in Hindu religious art in Khmer temples dating back between the 7th and 13th centuries A.D.

== Gallery ==
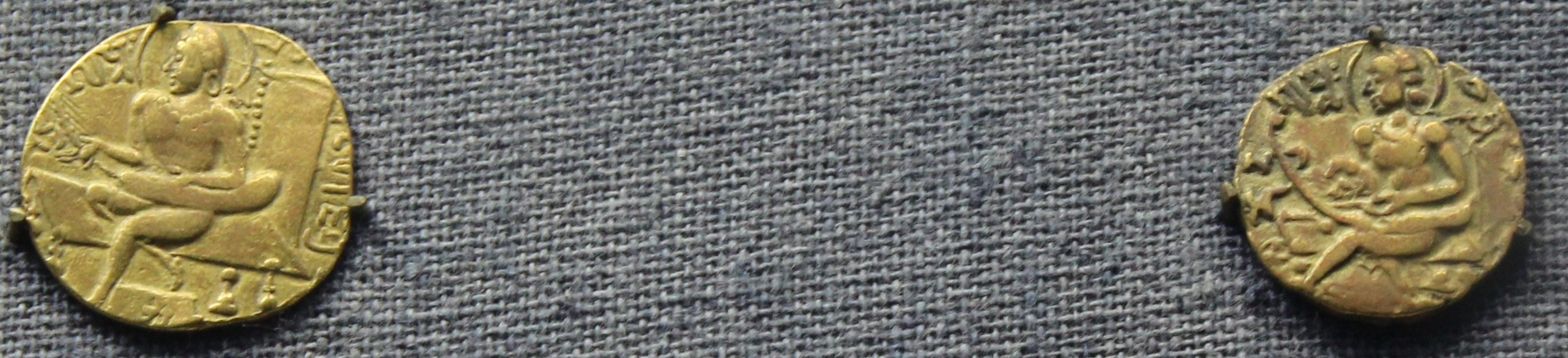

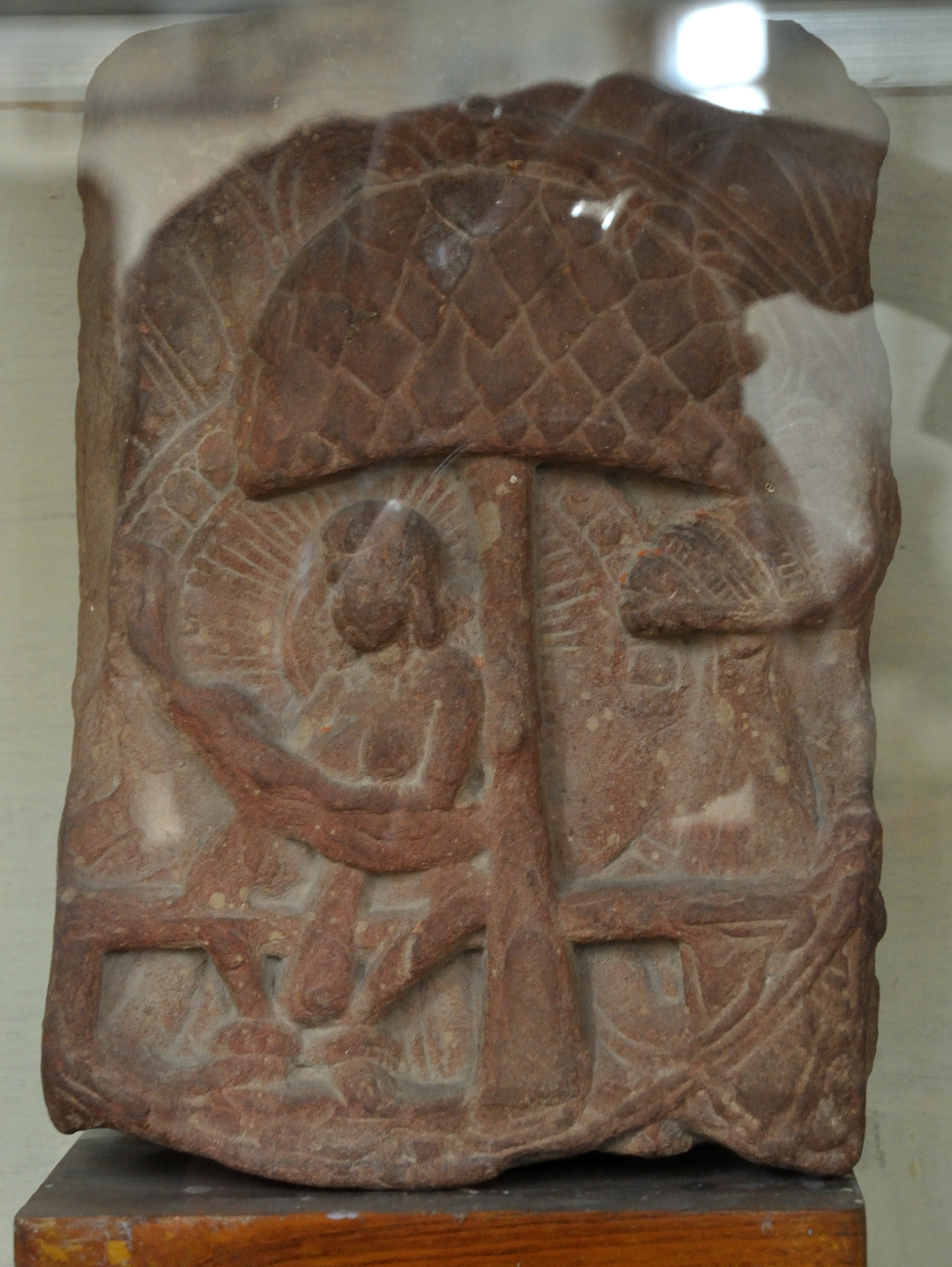
Harp-style vina

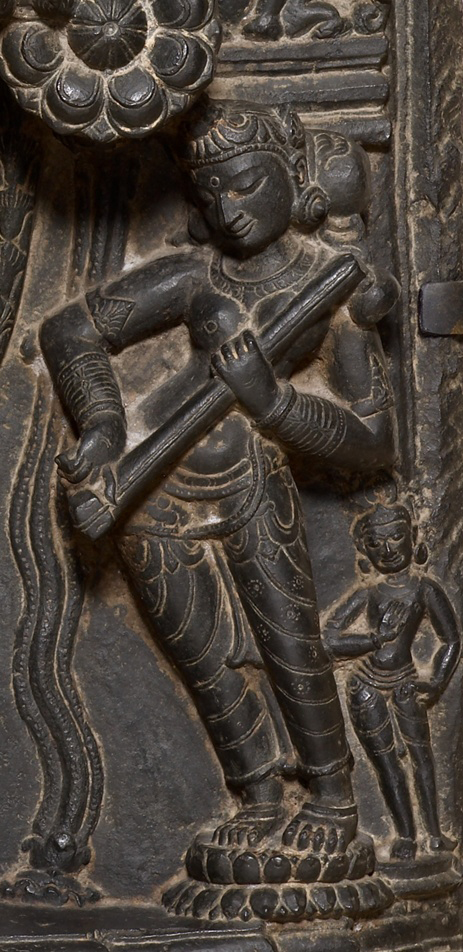
A medieval form of the veena, the ālāpiṇī vīṇā, from Bangladesh, 10th - 12th century C.E. This was a one-string tube zither or stick zither, possibly related to the modern rudra veena.

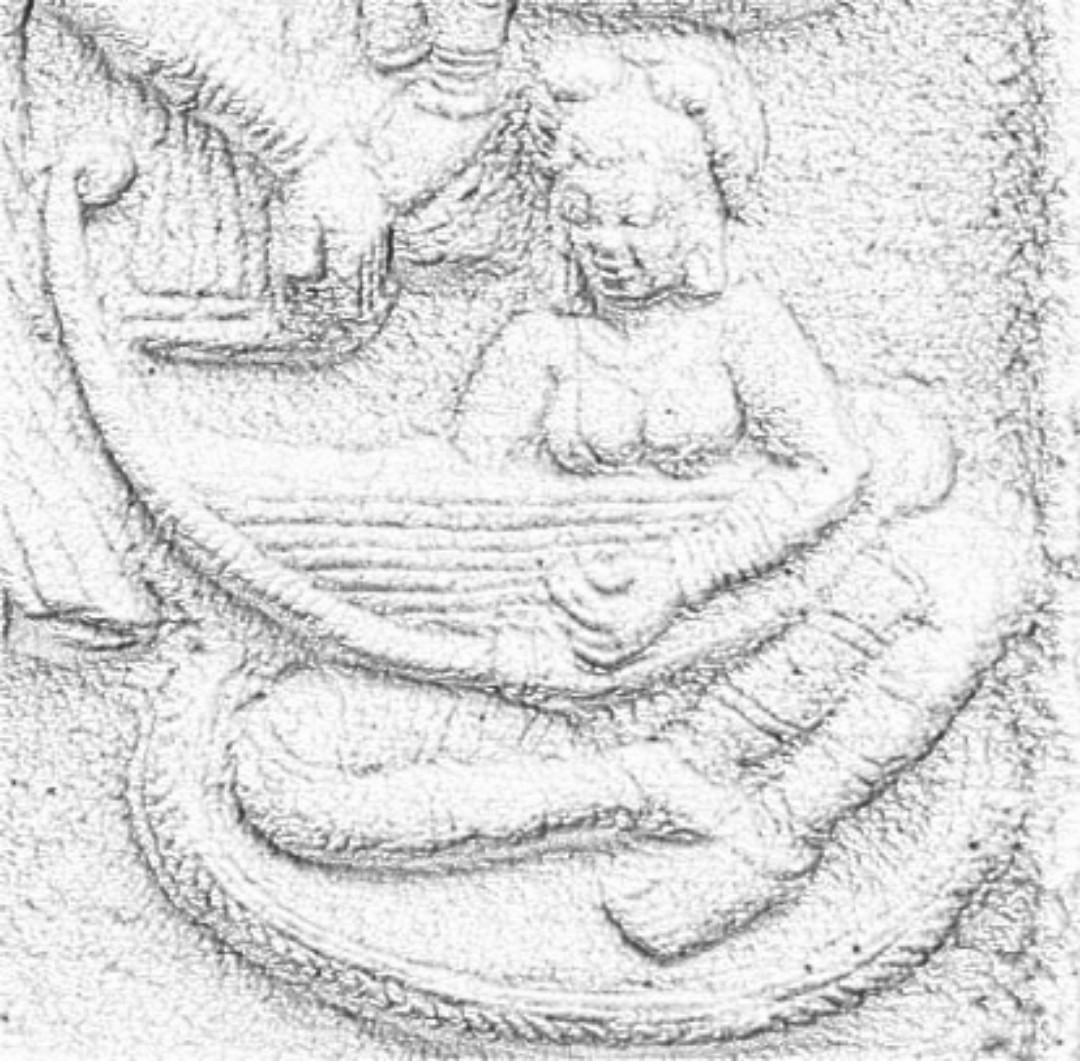
Sketch of Pawaya lute, 4th-5th century AD

== Bibliography ==
- Judith Becker, The Migration of the Arched Harp from India to Burma, The Galpin Society Journal, vol. 20, pp. 17–23
- Terry E. Miller and Sean Williams. The Garland handbook of Southeast Asian music. Routledge, 2008. ISBN 0-415-96075-4
- Muriel C. Williamson The Burmese Harp: Its Classical Music, Tunings, and Modes, Northern Illinois University Center For Southeast Asian Studies, 2000
- Arthur Llewellyn Basham, The Wonder That Was India, Scholarly Publishing Office, University of Michigan, 2008, 696 pp.
- The Natyasastra (Vol. 2): A treatise on Hindu dramaturgy and histrionics (Chapters 28-36) (translated by Manomohan Ghosh), 1961, Calcutta, Asiatic Society of Bengal (Biblioteca Indica); reprint: Chaukhamba Surbharati Prakashan, 2016, Varanasi
