= Yazh Nool =

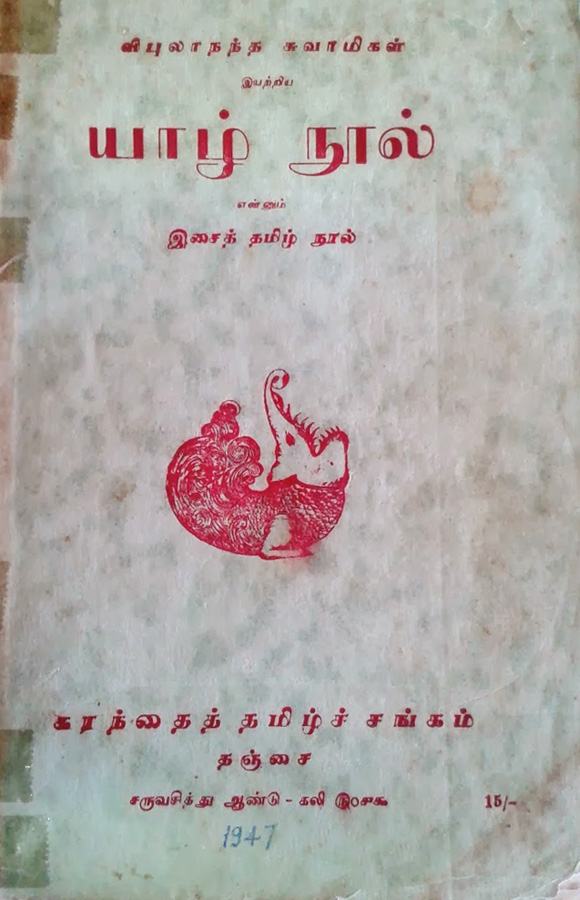
- Cover page of Yazh Nool, 1947
- Author: Swami Vipulananda
- Original title: யாழ் நூல்
- Language: Tamil (some portions in English)
- Subject: Tamil music
- Genre: Musical treatise
- Publisher: Karanthai Tamil Sangam, Yathumagi Printers
- Publication date: 1947
- Publication place: Sri Lanka
- Pages: ~97

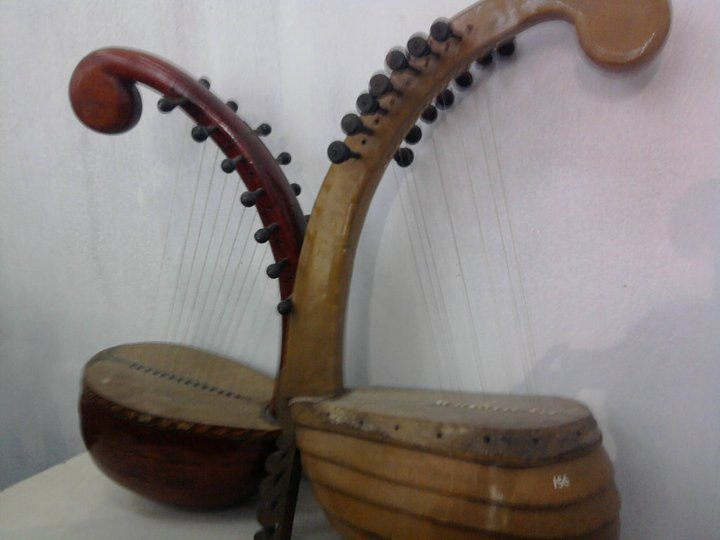
Two yazh instruments in a display case

Yazh Nool or Yal Nool (Tamil: யாழ் நூல்; pronounced [jɑːɻnuːl]; lit. The Book of Yazh) is a musical research book on yazh, one of the ancient musical instruments of the Tamils. The book was written by Swami Vipulananda, the worlds' first Tamil professor from Batticaloa, Sri Lanka published in June 1947 at Tirukkollampudur Vilvaranyeswarar Temple with the support of The Karanthai Tamil Sangam and financial support of Nachandupatti, P.RM.RM.ST Sitambaram Chettiar. The book is considered one of Vipulananda's significant works as well as an important treatise on the musical heritage of yazh.

== Background ==
The ancient poetic work Silappatikaram provides some details about ancient Tamil music and yazh. However, it does not accurately define Tamil music and yazh. Its poetic old Tamil is hard to understand in the modern Tamil language, and some Tamil scholars find it difficult to translate its teachings into a modern context. For these reasons, Swami Vipulananda undertook his research on Tamil music and yazh.

== Description ==
The book presents in-depth research on several ancient books that describe Tamil musical melody. It notably describes six different types of forgotten yazh instruments: Vil yazh, Peri yazh, Makara yazh, Cakota yazh, Seeri yazh, and Cenkotti yazh. Swami Vipulananda spent 14 years researching the book. The book has become the basis for the central concept of yazh and is used as a research tool by scholars.

== Publishing history ==
Three editions of the work have been published. The 1947 and 1974 editions were published by Karanthai Tamil Sangam; the second edition includes the author's English-language essay "A 1000-Stringed Yazh". The third edition was published in 2003 by Yathumagi Printers in Tirunelveli.
