= Swami Vipulananda =

Sri Lankan Tamil Hindu social reformer

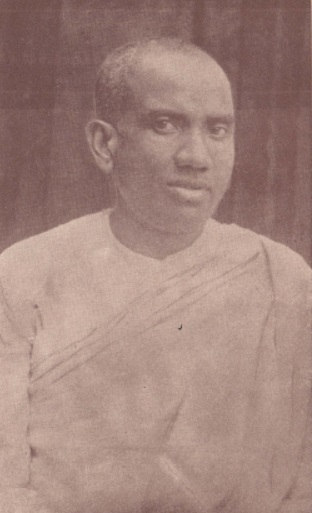
- Born: Mylvaganam Samithamby; 27 March 1892; Karaitivu, Batticaloa District, Eastern Province, British Ceylon (now in Ampara District, Eastern Province, Sri Lanka)
- Died: 19 July 1947 (aged 55); Batticaloa, Eastern Province, British Ceylon,(now Sri Lanka)
- Resting place: Monument at Sivananda Vidyalayam
- Other names: Vipulananda Adigal; Muththamizh Viththagar; Mylvaganam Swamigal
- Education: Bachelor of Science
- Occupation: Professor
- Employer: University of Ceylon
- Known for: Hindu reformer

Swami Vipulananda (Tamil: சுவாமி விபுலாநந்தர்; 27 March 1892 – 20 July 1947), also known as Vipulananda Adigal, was a Sri Lankan Tamil Hindu social reformer, literary critic, author, poet, teacher and ascetic from the Eastern Province of Sri Lanka. Vipulananda was an early pioneer associated with the Indian-based Ramakrishna Mission in Sri Lanka. Along with other reformers, Vipulananda was instrumental in the revival of the Hindu religion and native traditions in Sri Lanka after a long period of dormancy and decline during the previous 500 years of colonial rule by various European powers.

== Biography ==
Vipulananda was born in the village of Karativu, in the south of Batticaloa in Sri Lanka in 1892. His father's name was Samiththamby and mother's name was Kannamma. His birth name was Mylvaganam. Vipulananda had his early education in St. Michael's College National School in Batticaloa city. After completing his high school education at the age of 16, Vipulananda became a teacher in various cities across the island nation. During his tenure as a teacher he completed his Bachelor of Science degree from the University of London, and also became the first Sri Lankan Tamil Pandithar, a degree awarded by the Tamil Nadu-based Madurai Tamil Sangam, a linguistics academy created to promote the study of Tamil language. Vipulananda eventually became the head of operations of the Ramakrishna Mission in Sri Lanka as well as a professor of Tamil language in two universities.

== Literary contributions ==
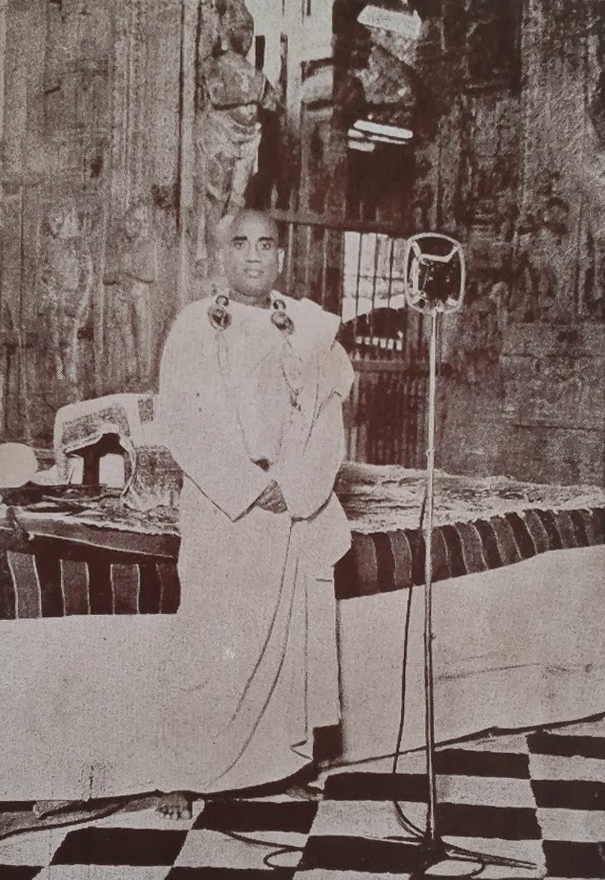
Swami Vipulanandar during Tri-Tamil conference in Madurai on 1 Aug 1942

Apart from Vipulananda's knowledge of Tamil he also knew English, Greek, Latin, Sanskrit and Sinhala.

After researching Tamil music and other Indian musical forms and musical instruments for many years, Vipulananda produced the seminal book of scientific research in Tamil called the Yazh Nool, or Book of Stringed Musical Instruments, which was published just before he died in 1947. The book was an effort by the author to understand and explain the intricacies and technicalities of genre of Tamil music in general, and the stringed musical instruments in particular, using modern techniques and tools of research and calculations based on mathematics and physics. Yal Nool is recognized as a unique work of its kind.

Using the literary traditions in Sanskrit, Greek and English he wrote Mathangaculamani, a translation of twelve of Shakespeare's plays, as a treatise on drama with commentaries focusing on various aspects of drama such as the plot, structure, sequence of action, characterization, subjective experience and gestures. Professor Chelva Kanaganayagam, in a critical review of Mathangaculamani, concludes that

The major contribution of the text is its attempt to establish drama as a valid academic discipline rather than provide a basis for performance.

Vipulananda also served as editor of several publications including Ramakrishna Vijayam (Tamil), Vivekananda (Tamil) and Prabuddha Bharata (English). He also edited and helped publish literary works of several well-known scholars. His translations from English to Tamil include selected writings of Swami Vivekananda, Bengali Nobel Laureate Rabindra Nath Tagore and historian Kathiresan Chettiar. He also translated from Tamil to English selected poems from the Sangam literature period, devotional songs from the Bhakti movement period, and poems of Subramanya Bharathi and Navaneetha Krishna Bharathi.

Vipulananda authored six major Tamil publications: a collection of four Prabanthangal, Mathangaculamani, The Great Dance of Thillai, Umamageswaram (all related to Saiva traditions of the Hindu religion), Dictionary of Technical Terms on Chemistry and Yal Nool. A collection of 170 essays, written from 1914 to 1947, were published posthumously in four parts in 1995. He also wrote many poems, and a collection of 32 of his poems was published in 1995. He was a good public speaker and most of his speeches, focusing mainly on history of the Tamils, Tamil literature, Tamil music and musical instruments, and Vedanta philosophy, were published in international journals and magazines.

== Ramakrishna Mission ==
Founded in 1897 by Swami Vivekananda, the disciple of Ramakrishna, the Ramakrishna Mission is a unique order of ascetics and volunteers dedicated to service to community, irrespective of religious, caste, creed or language differences. The mission, while promoting spiritual development, does not believe in religious conversion. The mission's charitable and philanthropic activities focus mainly on the provision of educational and medical services to the weaker segment of the population through schools, hospitals and orphanages run by the mission. It became a counter weight to Christian missionary-run charitable organizations throughout South Asia.

Vipulananda initially met the head of the Mylapore Ramakrishna Mission, Swami Sarvananda, in Colombo in 1916. This was followed up with another visit in Jaffna in 1917. He entered the Mylapore Ramakrishna Math in 1922 for his monastic training. On completion of the training in 1924, he was given the name Vipulananda. After his ordination he dedicated his life to educational and spiritual pursuits and service to the community in Sri Lanka and India.

In 1925 Vipulananda became an administrator of Ramakrishna Mission (RKM) schools in Sri Lanka. He was instrumental in founding new RKM schools in Jaffna, Batticalao, Trincomalee and in many villages. He also founded orphanages – two for boys at Vaitheeswara Vidyalayam, Jaffna and Sivananda Vidyalayam in Batticaloa, and one for girls in Karativu. Thereafter, a number of RKM schools were opened in several remote villages in the North and East of Sri Lanka. This provided an alternative to the natives to go to schools and orphanages that were not associated with western Christian missionaries. He also helped his lifelong friend A. M. A. Azeez, a pioneering Sri Lankan Muslim educator and civil servant, to establish charitable organizations to help poor Muslims in the east of the country.

== Professional career ==
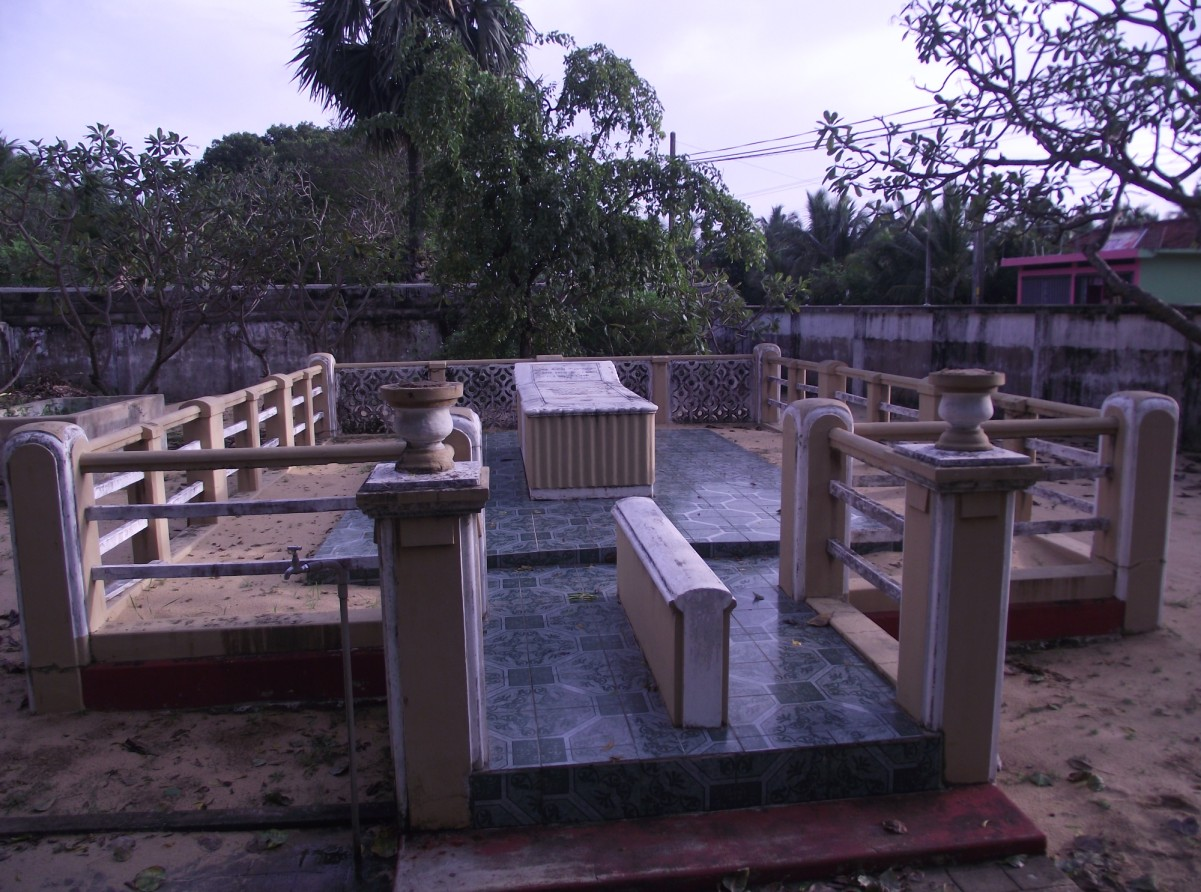
Swami Vipulananda's burial place and memorial

As a noted educationist, scholar and community worker, Vipulananda was invited by the University of Madras to present its case for the establishment of a Tamil University to the special commission set up to investigate the proposal. On the recommendation of the commission, the Annamalai University was opened in 1927. In 1931 he became its first Professor of Tamil language. Professor Vipulananda also received a second invitation to become the first Professor of Tamil soon after the University of Ceylon was established in 1943, which he held until his death in 1947. Thus Professor Vipulananda enjoys the unique distinction of being the first scholar to be appointed the first professor of Tamil in two Universities in two different countries.

Vipulananda was a strong advocate of the mother tongue as the medium of education, but stressed the importance of learning other languages. At Sivananda Vidyalayam, in addition to Tamil, Vipulananda facilitated the teaching of English, Sinhala and Latin. He also recognized and promoted the importance of learning sciences such as biology, chemistry, mathematics and physics, as well as job-related technical subjects. He facilitated the efforts of other Tamil scholars to translate science and technology publications into Tamil by providing suitable technical terms.

Based on his critical studies of some of Professor Vipulananda's writings, Mr. K.S. Sivakumaran, one of the notable literary critics from Sri Lanka, has called him a pioneer of Tamil literary criticism and the first Sri Lankan Tamil literary critic.

As a social reformer, Vipulananda led the movement to recognize Subramanya Bharathi, a Brahmin by birth, as the Maha Kavi (National Poet), and succeeded despite strong opposition from socially and politically powerful elites due to Bharathi's anti caste views and his opposition to the perpetuation of the caste system and the superstitious practices and rituals. As a nationalist, he hoisted the Indian flag on the occasion of the visit of Sir George Fredrick Stanley to the Annamalai University for the 1937 convocation, while India was still a British possession.

There are number of institutions named after him in Sri Lanka. Sri Lanka and Germany have issued stamps honoring him. He died after a brief illness on July 19, 1947. Swami Vipulananda is buried close to the Sivananda Vidyalayam in Kalladi, near Batticaloa city. (see picture here).

== See also ==
Other social reformers from Sri Lanka of the same period

- Anagarika Dharmapala
- Arumuka Navalar
- Kumaraswamy Pulavar
