= Saung =

Burmese traditional musical instrument

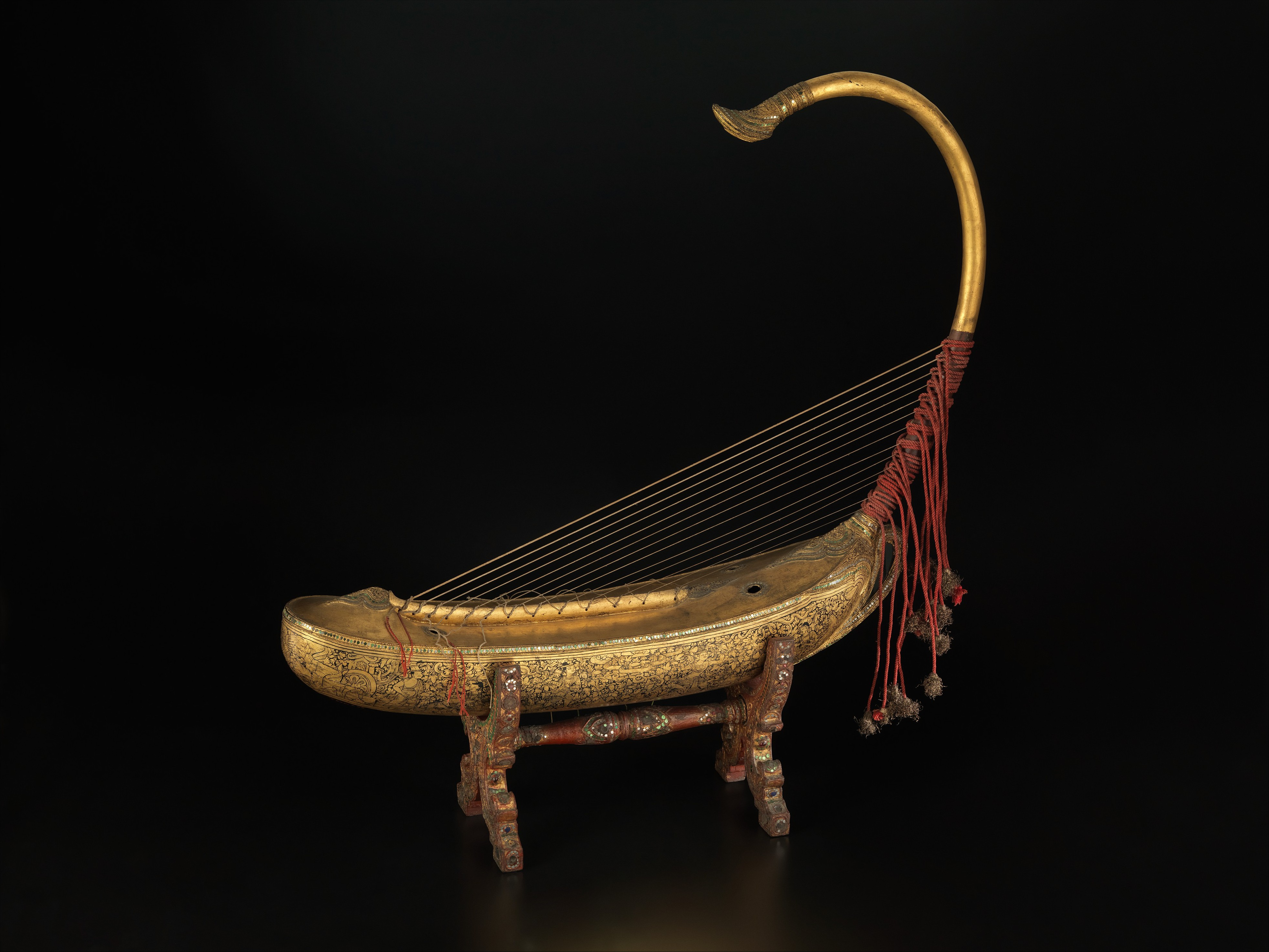
- Saùng-Gauk, 19th century

String instrument
- Classification: String instrument (plucked)
- Hornbostel–Sachs classification: 322: 322.1 Open harps – The harp has no pillar.; 322.11 Arched harps. (The plane of the strings lies perpendicular to the resonator's surface, the neck curves away from the resonator.)

Related instruments
- Persian chang; Cambodian pin; Arched Harp; T'na or na den

The saung (Burmese: စောင်း, MLCTS caung; also known as the saung-gauk (စောင်းကောက်): IPA: [sáʊɰ̃ɡaʊʔ], Burmese harp, Burma harp, or Myanmar harp), is an arched harp used in traditional Burmese music. The saung is regarded as a national musical instrument of Burma. The saung is unique in that it is a very ancient harp tradition and is said to be the only surviving harp in Asia.

== Etymology and terminology ==
Saung (စောင်း) is the Burmese word for "harp," and is etymologically derived from the Persian word chang, which is the Persian arched harp. The Burmese arched harp is more precisely called saung gauk (စောင်းကောက်, IPA: [sáʊɰ̃ɡaʊʔ]; lit. 'arched harp'), while another indigenous lyre is called byat saung (ဗျပ်စောင်း) or saungbya (စောင်းပြား; lit. 'flat harp').

== Description ==
The Burmese harp is classified as an arched horizontal harp since the resonator body is more horizontal as opposed to the Western harp, which has a vertical resonator. The main parts of the harp are the body, the long curved neck, carved out of the root of a tree, and a string bar running down the center of the top of the body. The top of the resonator body is covered with a tightly stretched deer hide, heavily lacquered in red with four small circular sound holes. The standard dimensions of the saung are 80 by 16 by 16 centimetres (31.5 by 6.3 by 6.3 in). The arch rises about 60 centimetres (24 in) from the body. Smaller harps have been made for smaller players.

The neck terminates in a highly decorated representation of the bo tree leaf. The whole of the harp body is decorated with pieces of mica ("Mandalay pearls"), glass, gilt, and red and black lacquer. The stand is similarly decorated. The ends of the strings on the harp are decorated with red cotton tassels. The saung's strings are made of silk or nylon.

The thirteen to sixteen strings of the harp angle upwards from the string bar to the string bindings on the lower part of the curved arch of the neck. Traditionally, tuning was accomplished by twisting and adjusting the string bindings. Recently constructed harps have machine heads or tuning pegs to make tuning easier. The traditional silk strings have also been supplanted by nylon strings, but silk-stringed harps can still be seen.

The harp is played by sitting on the floor with the body in the lap, and the arch on the left. The strings are plucked with the right hand fingers from the outside. The left hand is used to dampen the strings to promote clarity and produce staccato notes. Stopped tones are produced by using the left thumbnail to press against the string from the inside to increase its tension.

== History ==
The Burmese harp is a very ancient instrument. Musical researchers theorize that the arched harp came to Burma from Mesopotamia by way of India. Mesopotamia has some of the oldest images of arched harps, including pictographs from circa 3000 B.C.

The saung may have been introduced as early as 500 AD from southeastern India, based on archaeological evidence, namely in the form of Burmese temple reliefs that depict a long-necked harp very similar to depictions found in Bengal.

The earliest archaeological evidence of the harp is at the Bawbawgyi Pagoda of the Sri Ksetra kingdom of the Pyu people, near present-day Pyay (Prome). At that site, there is a mid-600s sculptured relief depicting the arched harp with about five strings, appearing in a scene where musicians and a dancer are depicted. Contemporaneous Chinese chronicles from the same period cite Pyu musicians playing the arched harp. A Pyu embassy to China in 801–802 documents an orchestra containing an arched harp with 2 pegs.

The harp has survived continuously since that time, and has been mentioned in many chronicles and texts. The current Burmese word for the harp, "saung", has been recorded in Bagan temples, as well as in pictorial representations. Burmese chronicles describe the presence of harps in ceremonial ensembles at medieval Pagan, and female harpists who performed for royals. They are also shown on surviving temple reliefs and mural paintings, including at Nagayon and Lawkahteikpan temples.

The earliest song-poem texts in Burmese date to the early 14th century, although the music has not survived. It is conjectured that this song-poem was harp music since the text refers to the siege of Myinzaing, and "Myinzaing" is one of the classical tunings and musical forms in use today.

By the Ava dynasty, the harp had taken the form of an incurved arch with 11 strings. The harp benefited from the cultural renaissance of the Konbaung era (1752–1885). When the Burmese king Hsinbyushin sacked Ayuthaya, he brought back with him many Siamese courtiers. The captured Siamese actors and musicians fueled new forms and experiments in harp music. The most significant innovator was the talented courtier Myawaddy Mingyi U Sa (1766–1853), who adapted repertoires of Siamese music into Burmese, adapted the Siamese Panji tales into Burmese Enaung-zat, composed harp music for it, and developed a whole new genre of harp music called "Yodaya" (the Burmese word for Ayutthaya), which is codified in the Mahāgīta corpus of Burmese classical music. U Sa was responsible for increasing the number of harp strings from seven to thirteen, such that the notes spanned two and a half octaves, from C3 to F5, and for establishing specifications, including improving the harp's tensile strength by using the curved root of the sha tree. The last Konbaung court harpist, Maung Maung Gyi, added the 14th string. Ba Than, a post-independence harpist, created a 16-string saung. After a period of decline before World War II, in 1947, Hmat Kyi, who descended from royal woodcarvers, created 7 harps for the State Schools of Fine Arts.

In the 18th century the instrument was introduced to Qing dynasty China, becoming known as zonggaoji (总稿机, a transliteration of "saung-gauk"). The instrument was played at feasts of the Chinese imperial court starting in 1788 as part of tribute.

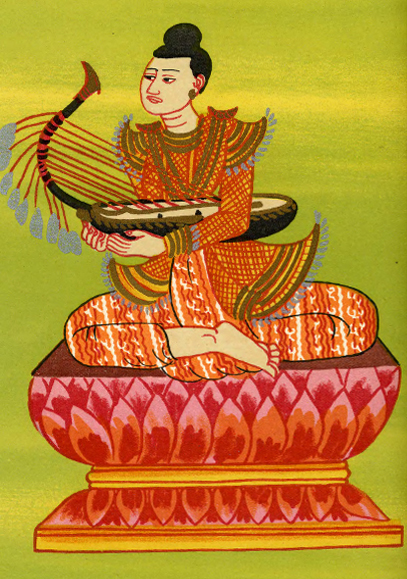
Minye Aungdin nat is traditionally depicted playing the saung.

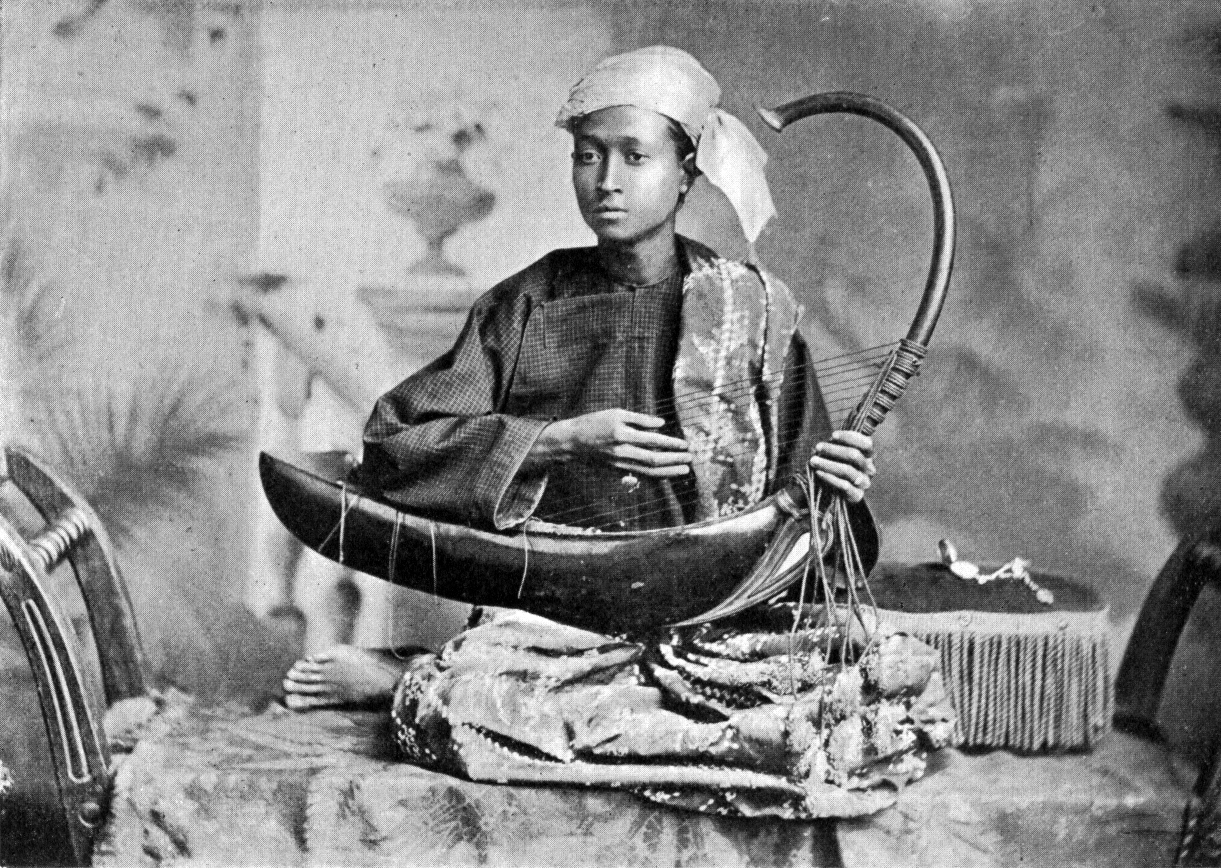
A saung musician in 1900

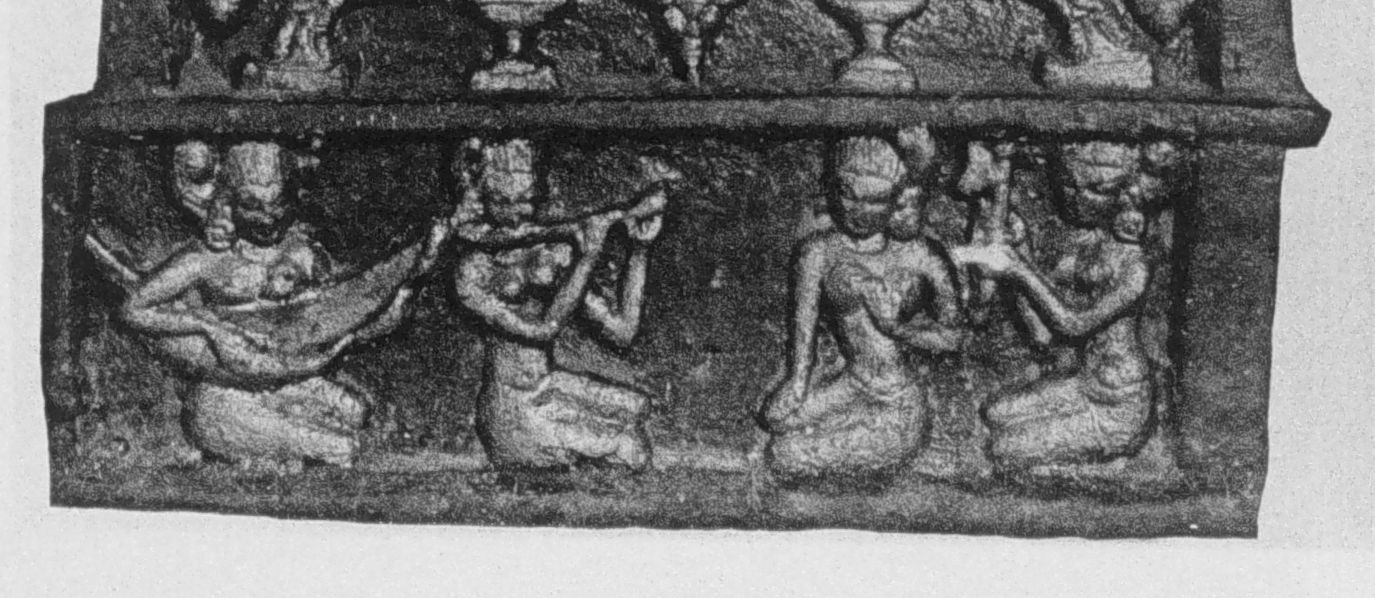
12th century A.D. sculpture from the Ananda Temple at Bagan, The women sing and play to the prince. From the left: harp, flute, singer, clapper.

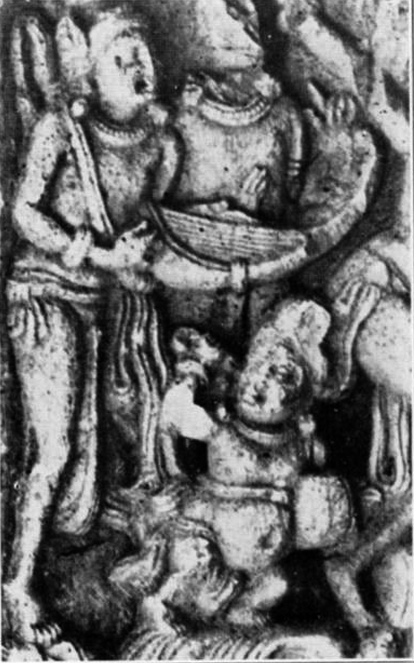
Relief of harpist playing the vina, Amaravati ca. 200 A.D. East coast of India.

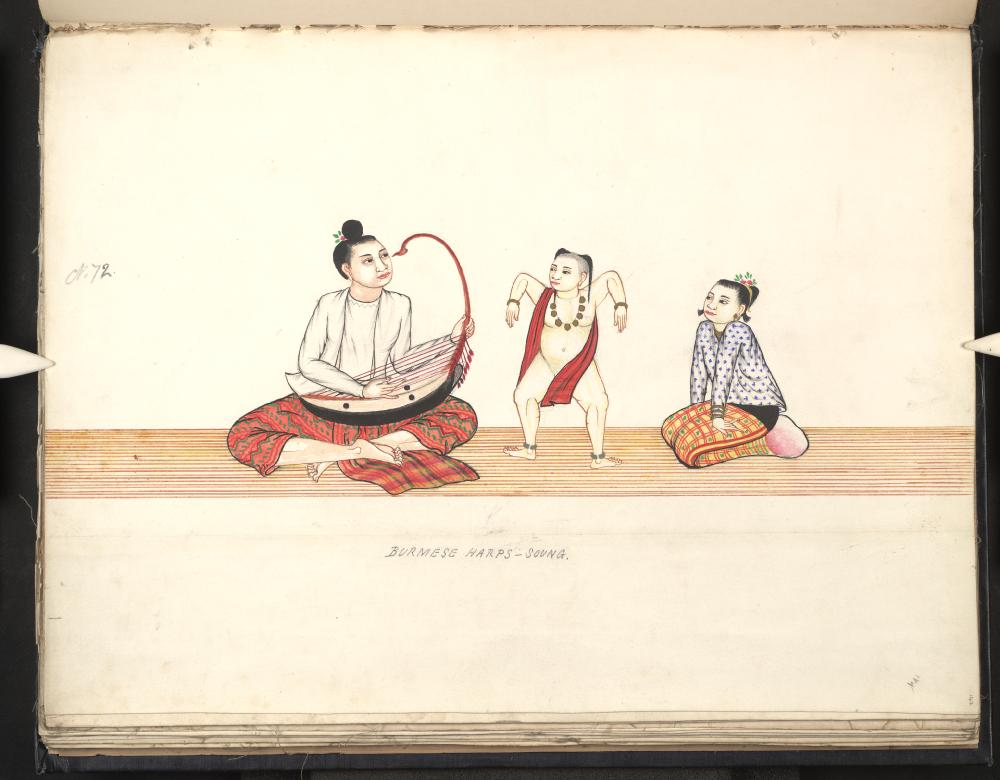
A 19th century Burmese watercolor depicting a saung musician

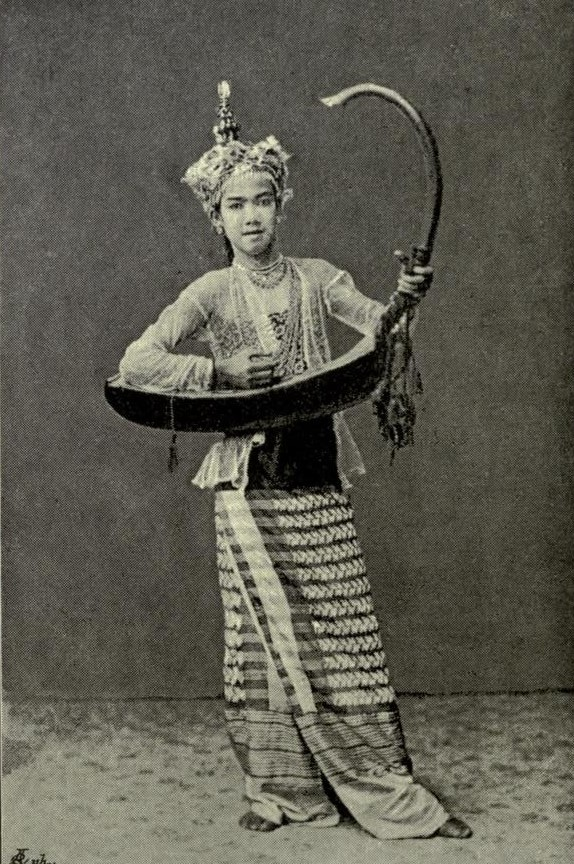
An 1894 photo depicting a Burmese maiden with the saung

== Music and musicians ==
Until the 1800s, the Burmese harp and its music were used exclusively for chamber music within the royal court, where it held status as the most prized of the court instruments. Since then, it has become popular with the general population, but is still played only in more intimate chamber settings. The instrument was built under patronage from the Kingdom of Burma. After World War II, the State School of Fine Arts received newly made harps by Burmese craftsmen.

The harp is usually accompanied by a singer, or more accurately, the singer is accompanied by the harp, with the harp adapting to the singer, who controls the time with a bell and clapper to indicate the music tempo.

The principal playing techniques in Mandalay include let-kat (လက်ကပ်), kaw (ကော့), zon-hswe-gyin (စုံဆွဲခြင်း), and tat (တပ်).

The Burmese classical music scale is tuned differently from the Western scale, and has been said to be derived from the descending cycle of fifths. The original tuning method extant from 1885 is called hnyin-lon, while musicians also use the auk-pyan, pale, and myin-zaing tuning methods. This is only approximately true, and traditionally, the harp is tuned differently for the four major different modes of Burmese classical music. Recently, due to the overriding influence of Western music, many harpists tune to the Western diatonic scale, since fewer and fewer singers feel fully comfortable with the traditional tunings.

Burmese music has not been written down with notation, only the text of the songs are recorded, and the rendition of the music has been passed down through the generations from teacher to student. The last and most well known harpist of the court was U Maung Maung Gyi (1855–1933), who was given a post at King Mindon's court at the young age of thirteen, and given the title "Dewa-Einda" ('Heavenly Musician;' devaindā), which now identifies him. He trained many musicians who became accomplished musicians in their own right. The lineage of today's harpists can be traced directly back to the Dewa-Einda and other musicians from the court of Mandalay.

With the British annexation and the fall of court of Mandalay, the Burmese court culture and traditions were still carried on for a while at the court of Saophas of Hsipaw, the Shan state closest to Mandalay culturally and geographically. The well-known harpists U Hpu Gyaung and Sao Mya Aye Kyi were from Hsipaw.

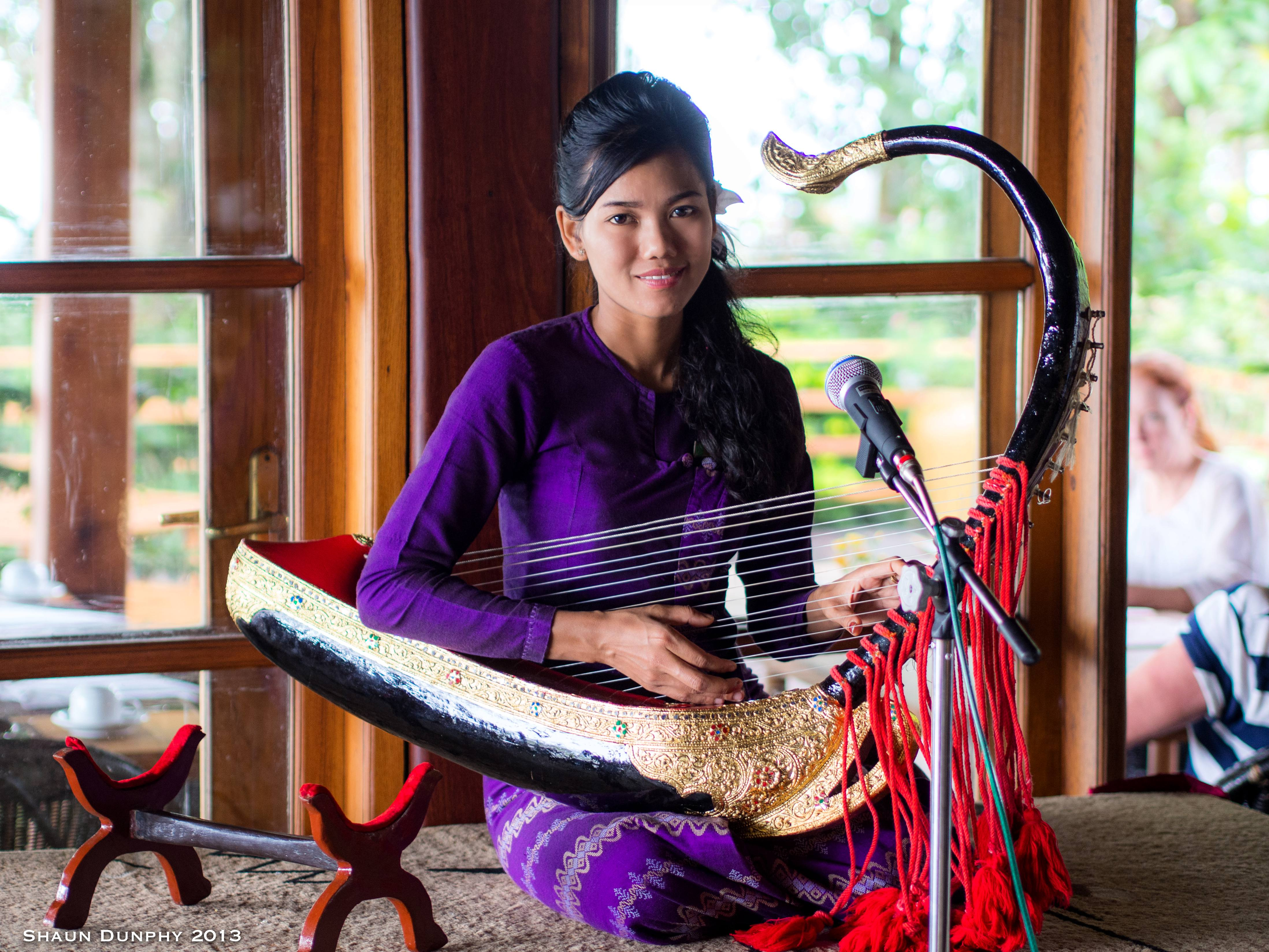
A Burmese musician playing the saung

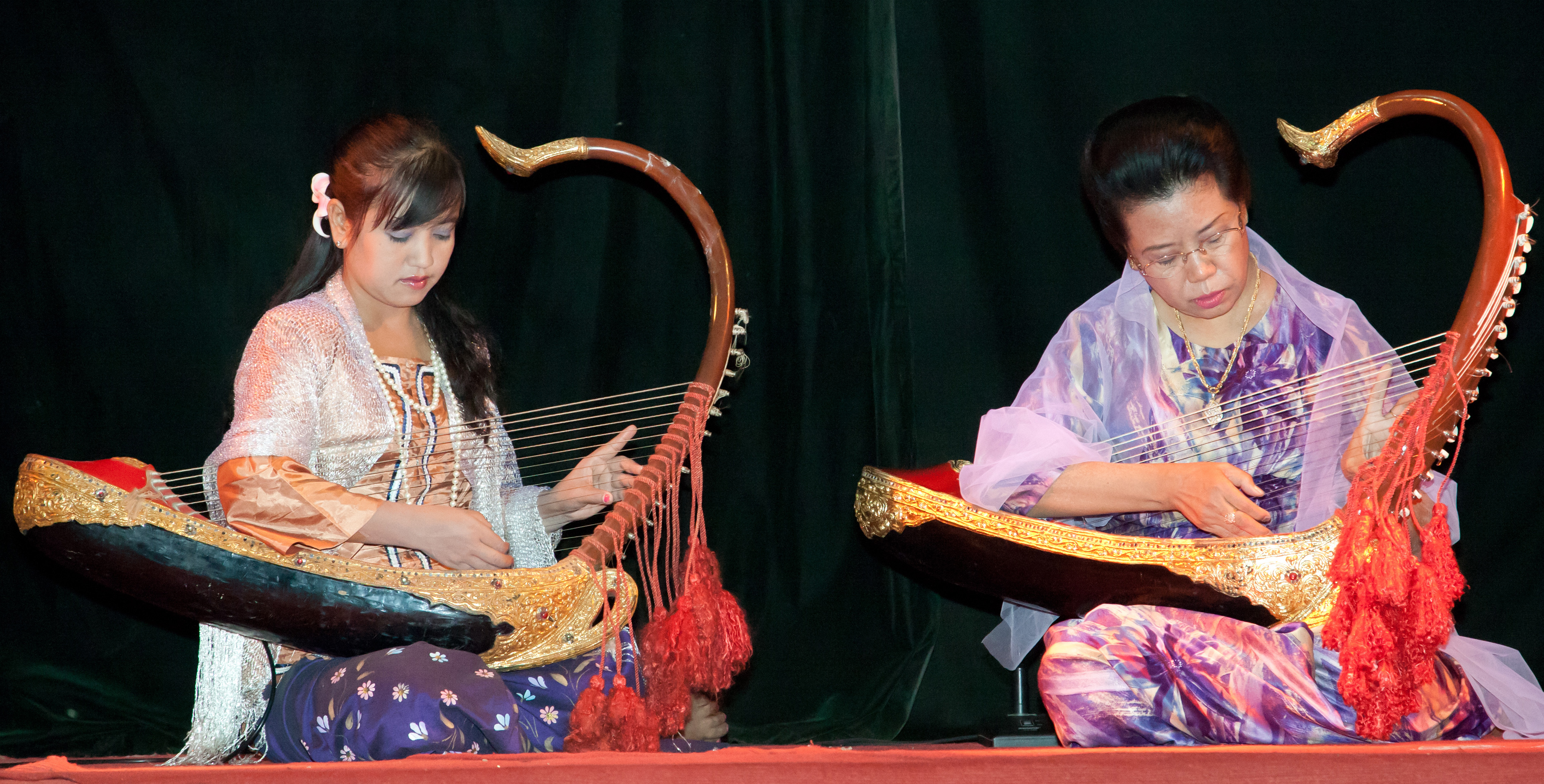
Two female musicians play the saung at a performance in Mandalay.

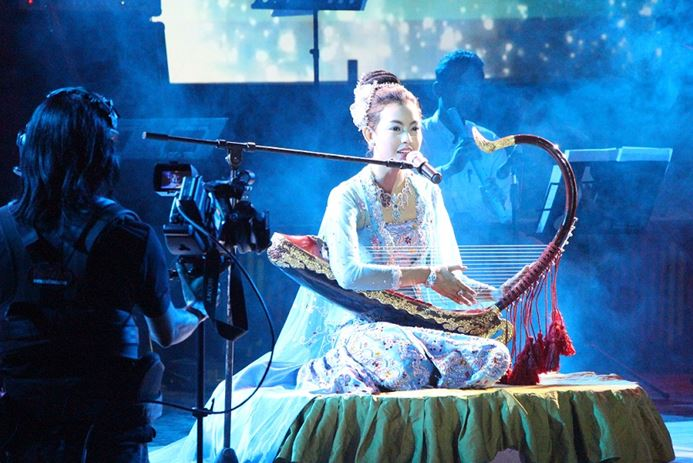
Burmese singer Wyne Lay playing the saung during a performance

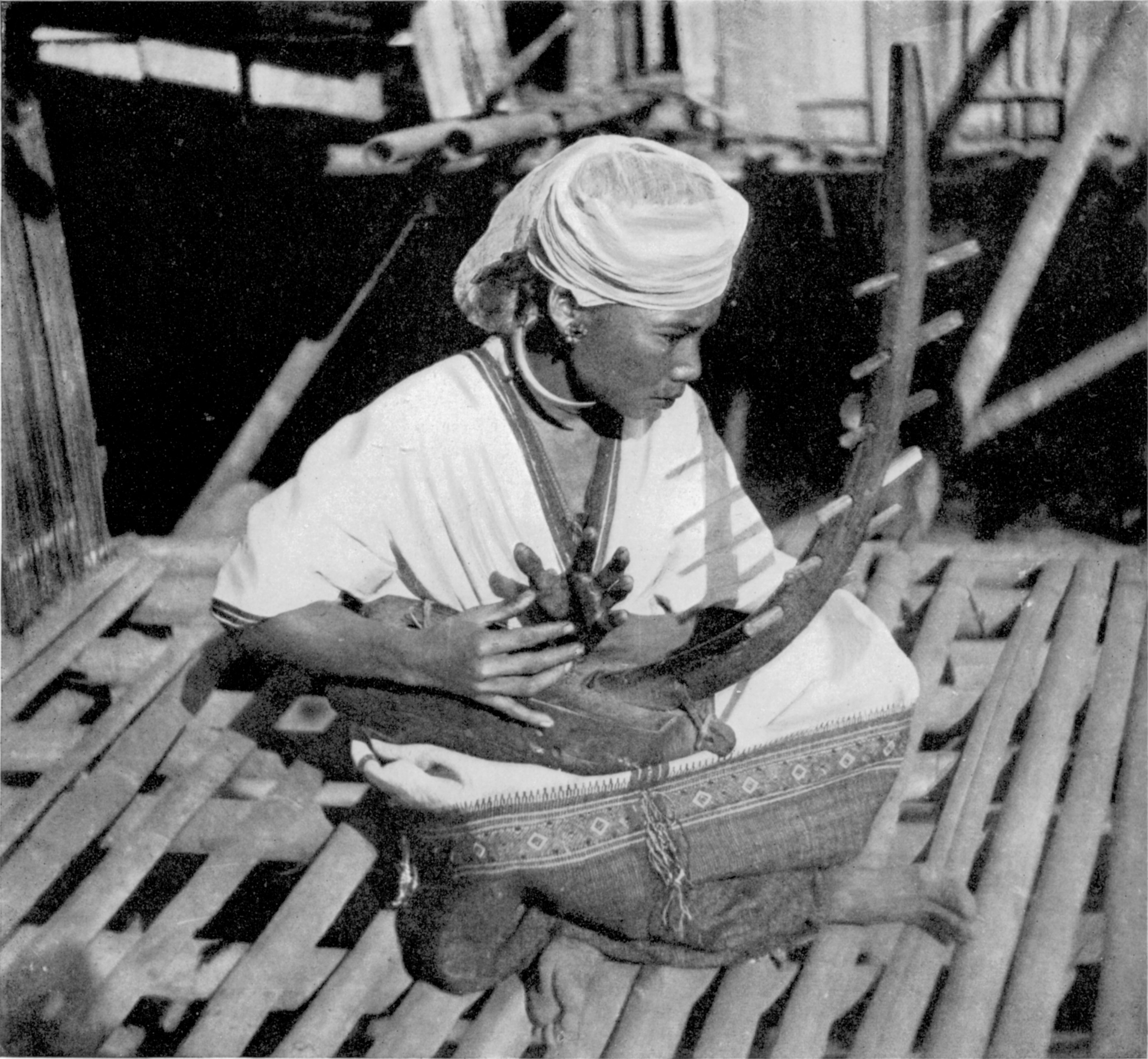
A Karen-style saung, called t'nah or na den

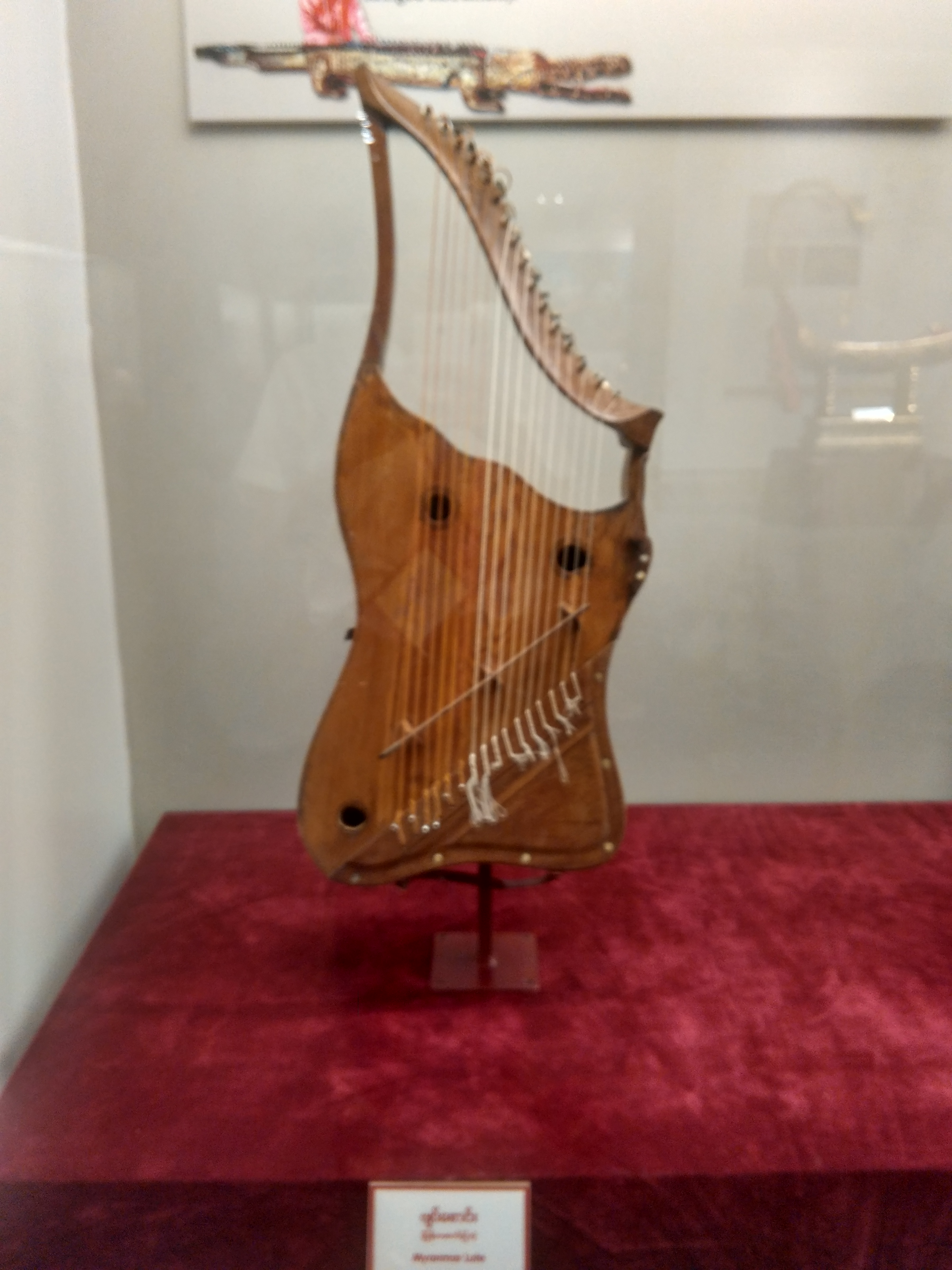
Another instrument using saung in its name, a museum display of the byat saung or byauth caungg (ဗျပ်စောင်း), the Burmese lyre

== In film ==
In 1956, the Japanese film director Kon Ichikawa made an Oscar nominated anti-war film called The Burmese Harp (Biruma no tategoto), set in Burma during World War II. The main character was a Japanese soldier who becomes a Buddhist monk due to the horrors of war. He plays the saung. However, the sound of the saung is removed from the soundtrack and replaced with an overdub of a Western classical pedal harp. Ichikawa also directed a remake of the film in 1985, which was also a major commercial and critical success.

== See also ==
- Music of Burma
