= Pin (harp) =

Cambodian harp

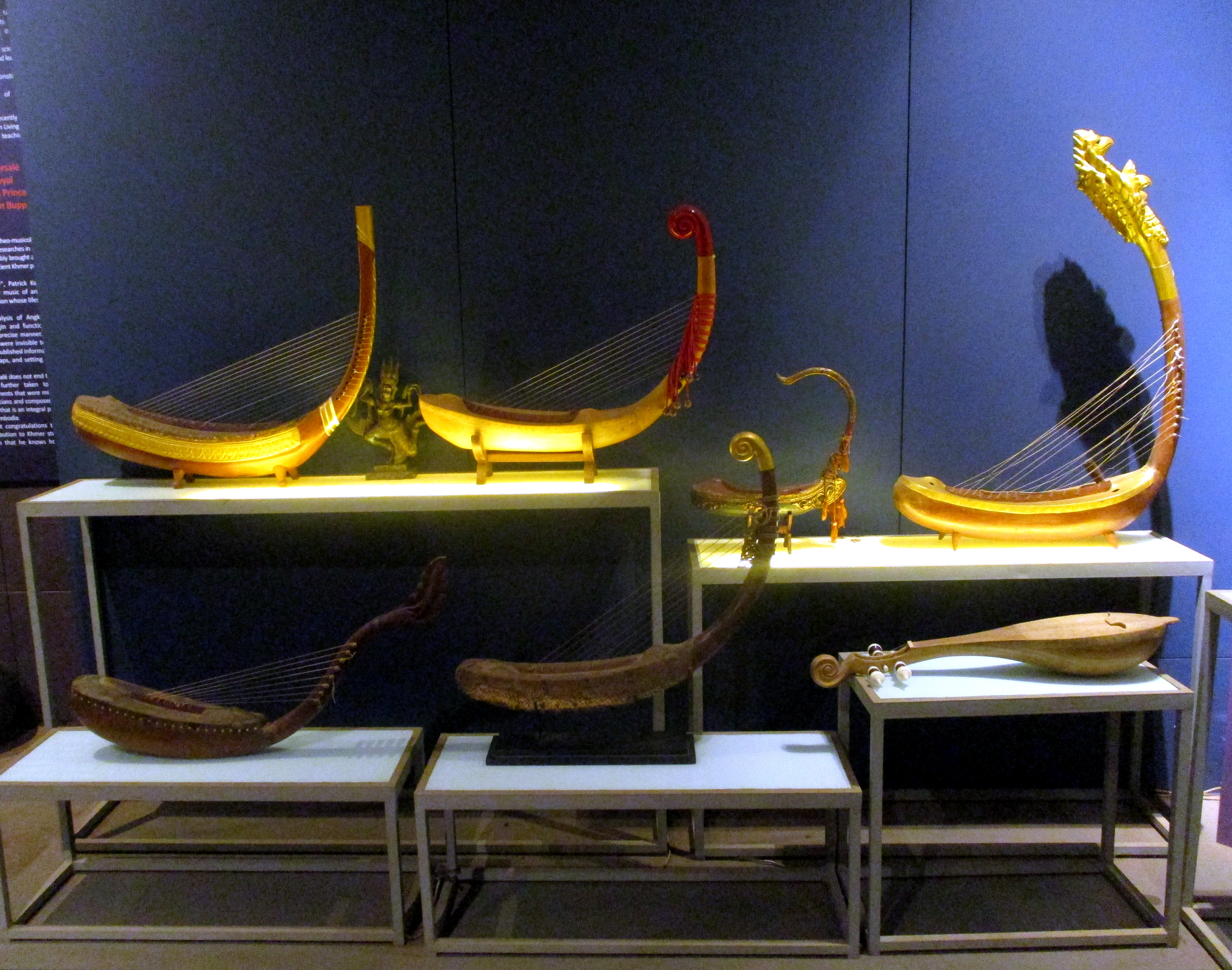
- Various pins at the Sounds of Angkor Exhibition in Theam's Gallery, Siem Reap, Cambodia.
- Classification: String instrument
- Hornbostel–Sachs classification: 322.11 (arched harp)

Related instruments
- Saung (Burmese harp)

Builders
- Patrick Kersalé

The pin (Khmer: ពិណ, pĭn [pɨn]) is a Cambodian arched harp, one of the most historically important instruments in Cambodian music. The instrument went extinct c. 16th century, and is now being restored in modern times. Its historical importance is emphasized by the very name for Cambodian classical music, pinpeat (Khmer: ពិណពាទ្យ). After the pin was no longer being used, Cambodians continued to use the instrument's name for classical music into the present era. When the pin was no longer being used, the tonal range of other instruments was expanded, possibly to compensate. Burmese saung gauk and roneats had more keys for the chromatic scale and the number of gongs in the kong von thom and kong toch "more than doubled in number since the musician depicted on the Angkorian carvings."

== Etymology ==
The word pin (ពិណ) derived from the Sanskrit word veena/ vina (वीणा). This musical instrument gave the name to Cambodian traditional musical ensemble known as pinpeat.

== History ==
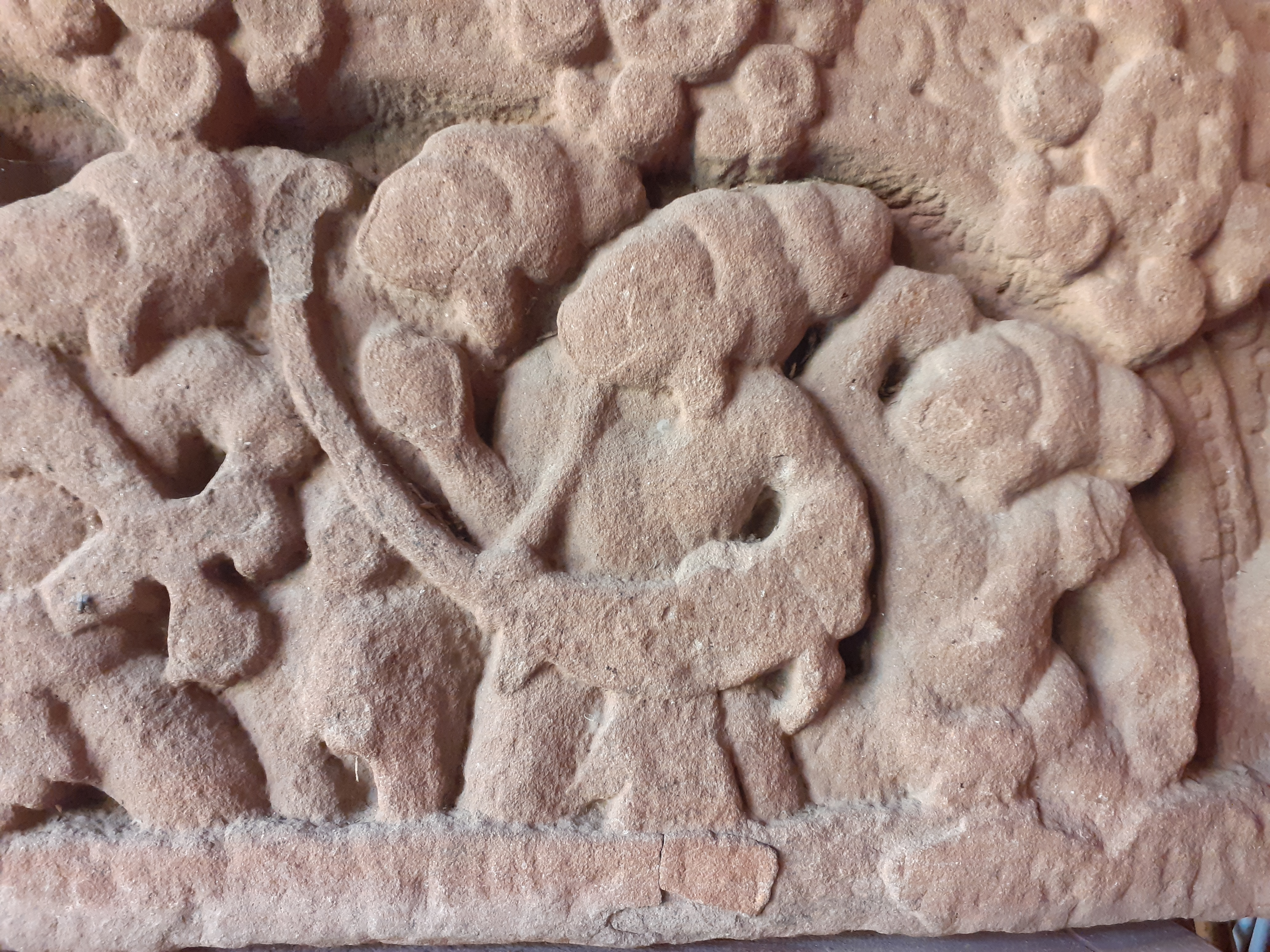
7th century Khmer depiction of harp (pin). National Museum of Cambodia

The pin may have been introduced to Cambodia since Funan period; however, the earliest surviving depiction of the pin in Cambodia is dated to the 7th century on the temple at Sambor Prey Kuk, the capital of Chenla. The instrument appeared in Hindu religious art in Khmer temples dating back between the 7th and 13th centuries A.D. The instrument was recorded in a bas-relief at Bayon, Cambodia, a Buddhist temple built in the 12th to 13th century A.D. During the Angkor era from the 9th to the 14th centuries A.D., it was still being played in the royal Khmer ensemble.

There are multiple theories for the disappearance of the instrument. "One idea is that the instrument disappeared because of the development of the melodic percussion orchestra." Another theory is that the instrument was lost in 1431 during the war that demolished the Angkor civilization. One more theory is that it was associated with Hindu religion and the instrument was left behind as the country became Buddhist.

== Recreation ==
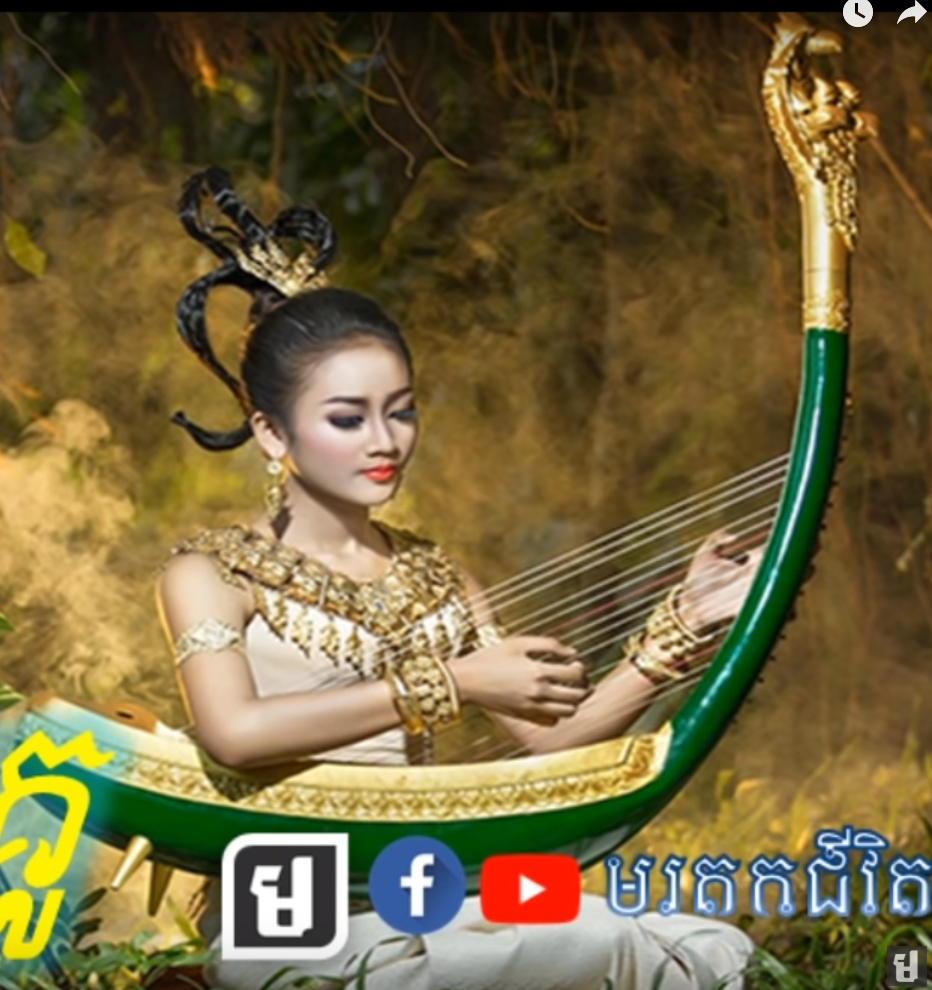
Picture of a Cambodian woman playing a modern pin.

Ethnomusicologist Patrick Kersalé, who has worked in Asia for more than 20 years, studied images left over from the past, "tracing out the shape of the harp." He looked for clues to understand how the harps were used and made. He also looked at similar instruments in the region, such as the Burmese saung gauk and harps of the Kareni people. Kersalé asked Keo Sonan Kavei (a craftsman) to help him build the harp. To help the instrument become part of active culture again, Him Sophy began to compose for it.

== See also ==
- Saung, the Burmese arched harp
- Yazh, the Tamil arched harp
- Saraswati Veena, the ancient South Indian instrument which the Pin is named after
