= Vaitheeswara Vidyalayam =

- வைத்தீஸ்வர வித்தியாலயம்

Location
- Vannarpannai; Sivan Temple North Street, Vannarponnai, Jaffna, Sri Lanka; Jaffna, Jaffna District, Northern Province; Sri Lanka
- Coordinates: 9°40′22.70″N 80°00′34.10″E

Information
- School type: Public provincial 1AB
- School district: Jaffna Education Zone
- Authority: Northern Provincial Council
- School number: 1001008
- Teaching staff: 32
- Grades: 1-13
- Gender: Mixed
- Age range: 5-18

Vaitheeswara Vidyalayam (Tamil: வைத்தீஸ்வர வித்தியாலயம் Vaittīsvara Vittiyālayam, also known as Vaidyeshwara College) is a provincial school in Jaffna, Sri Lanka.

== See also ==
- List of schools in Northern Province, Sri Lanka
