= Kafir harp =

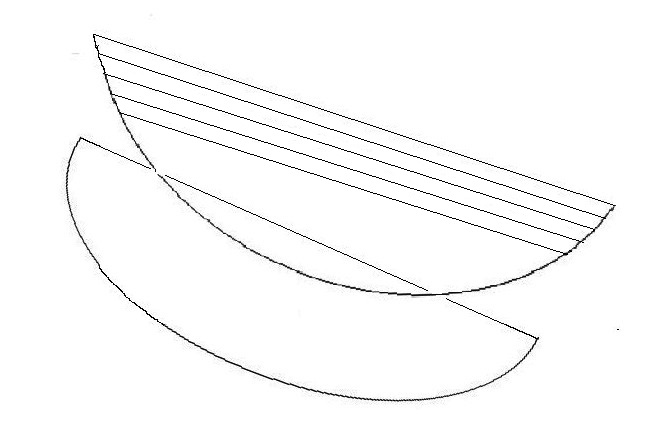
- Line drawing of a Kafir harp.

String instrument
- Other names: voč, voj, vẫć, vâj
- Classification: chordophone
- Hornbostel–Sachs classification: 311.122; 322.11 (Musical bow with several heterochord strings. Bow attached to resonator by poking through; has to be taken apart to remove the resonator. Alternatively can be called an arched harp if one considers resonator to be attached to bow.)

Related instruments
- ennanga

The Kafir harp is a traditional four- or five-stringed arched harp used by the Nuristanis native to the Nuristan Province of northeastern Afghanistan and Lower Chitral District of northwestern Pakistan. It is played during social gatherings, and to accompany epic storytelling or songs of heroic tales.

Similar harps used to be widespread in ancient times throughout Central Asia and India, and this harp possibly entered Afghanistan during the spread of Buddhism across the region but today the waji is not used in any other part of Afghanistan. It has been compared to the ennanga of Uganda and harp designs used in Sumer and ancient Egypt as far back as 3000 BC.

== Name ==
The Kafir harp is known in the Nuristani languages as Kamviri voč [ˈvot͡ʃ], Kata-vari voj [ˈβod͡ʒ], Ashkun vẫć [ˈβãt͡s], and Waigali vâj [ˈvad͡ʒ]. It has been linked to Sanskrit vā́dya, meaning "musical instrument".

== Construction and design ==
The Kafir harp is constructed of two main components, the soundbox and the stringholder. The soundbox is made from a hollowed piece of wood with a thick piece of animal skin stretched over it. The stringholder is a curved branch that sits on top of the soundbox, and up to five strings are pulled through holes created along the side of the branch. On one side of the branch, the strings are held in place with non-tuning knobs, on the other side the strings dangle off the instrument like tassels. One harp collected in an anthropological expedition in the 1950s had four strings that corresponded to the central tetrachord of the Dorian mode.

== Playing technique ==
When one plays the Kafir harp one has to balance the sound box on the left arm, leaving the strings to face up, rather than away from the musician. It is played with a plectrum in the right hand while using the left hand to mute certain strings. Stylistically, a piece of music featuring the Kafir harp may begin with an ostinato figure on the harp, underneath a soloist (who may or may not be the Kafir player himself) and/or by syncopated hand-clapping.

== Cultural importance ==
The Nuristanis, who claim a lineage back to Alexander the Great's Macedonian armies and who converted to Islam in the late 19th century, inhabit a remote mountain area in the north-east. The instruments played in Nuristan tend to be unique to the region, and there are no similar types of zithers or harps like the kafir harp to be found in other parts of Afghanistan. This harp is played predominantly by men in the region.
