= Trigonon =

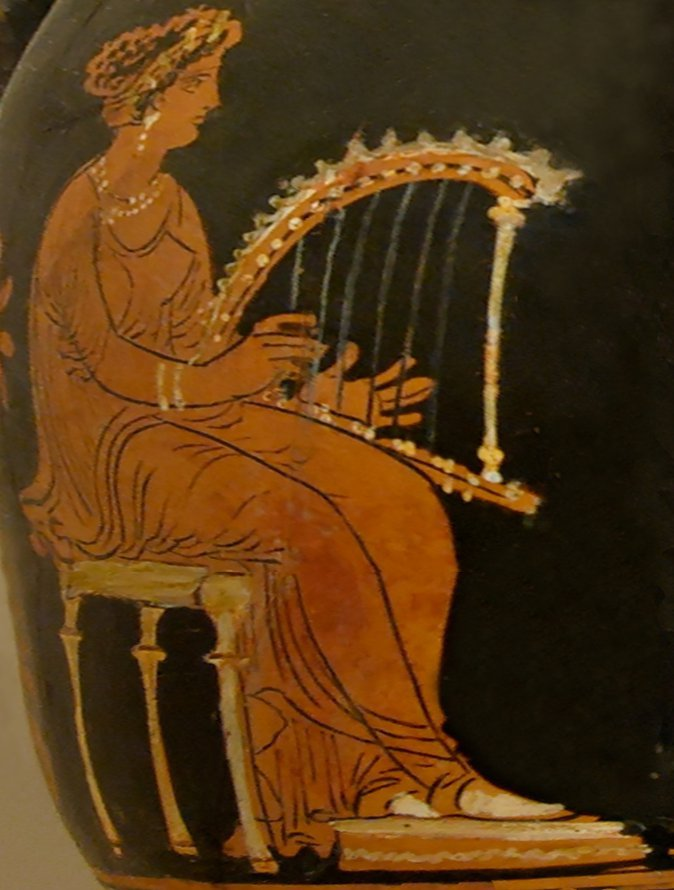
Woman with psaltērion or trigonon in red-figure pottery from Apulia, ca. 320–310 BC C. Anzi (British Museum).

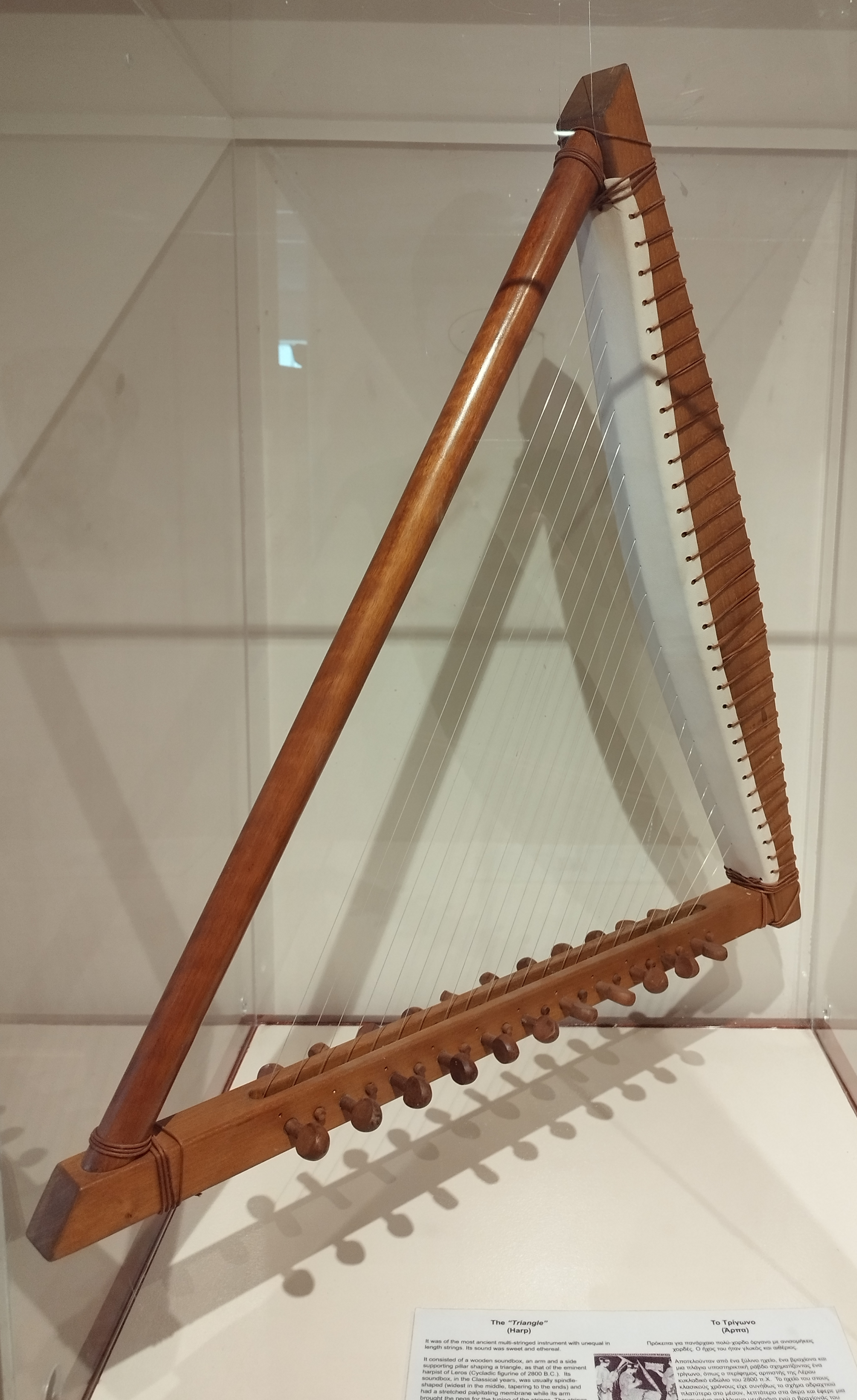
A modern reconstruction of a trigonon (or epigonion) in Kotsanas Museum of Ancient Greek Technology, Athens, Greece.

A trigonon (trígōnon, from Greek "τρίγωνον", "triangle") is a small triangular ancient Greek harp occasionally used by the ancient Greeks and probably derived from Assyria or Egypt. The trigonon is thought to be either a variety of the sambuca or identical with it.

A trigonon is represented on one of the Athenian red-figured vases from Cameiros in the island of Rhodes, dating from the 5th century BCE, which are preserved in the British Museum. The triangle is here an irregular one, consisting of a narrow base to which one end of the string was fixed, while the second side, forming a slightly obtuse angle with the base, consisted of a wide and slightly curved sound-board pierced with holes through which the other end of the strings passed, being either knotted or wound round pegs. The third side of the triangle was formed by the strings themselves, the front pillar, which in modern European harps plays such an important part, being always absent in these early Oriental instruments. A small harp of this kind having 20 strings was discovered at Thebes, Egypt in 1823.

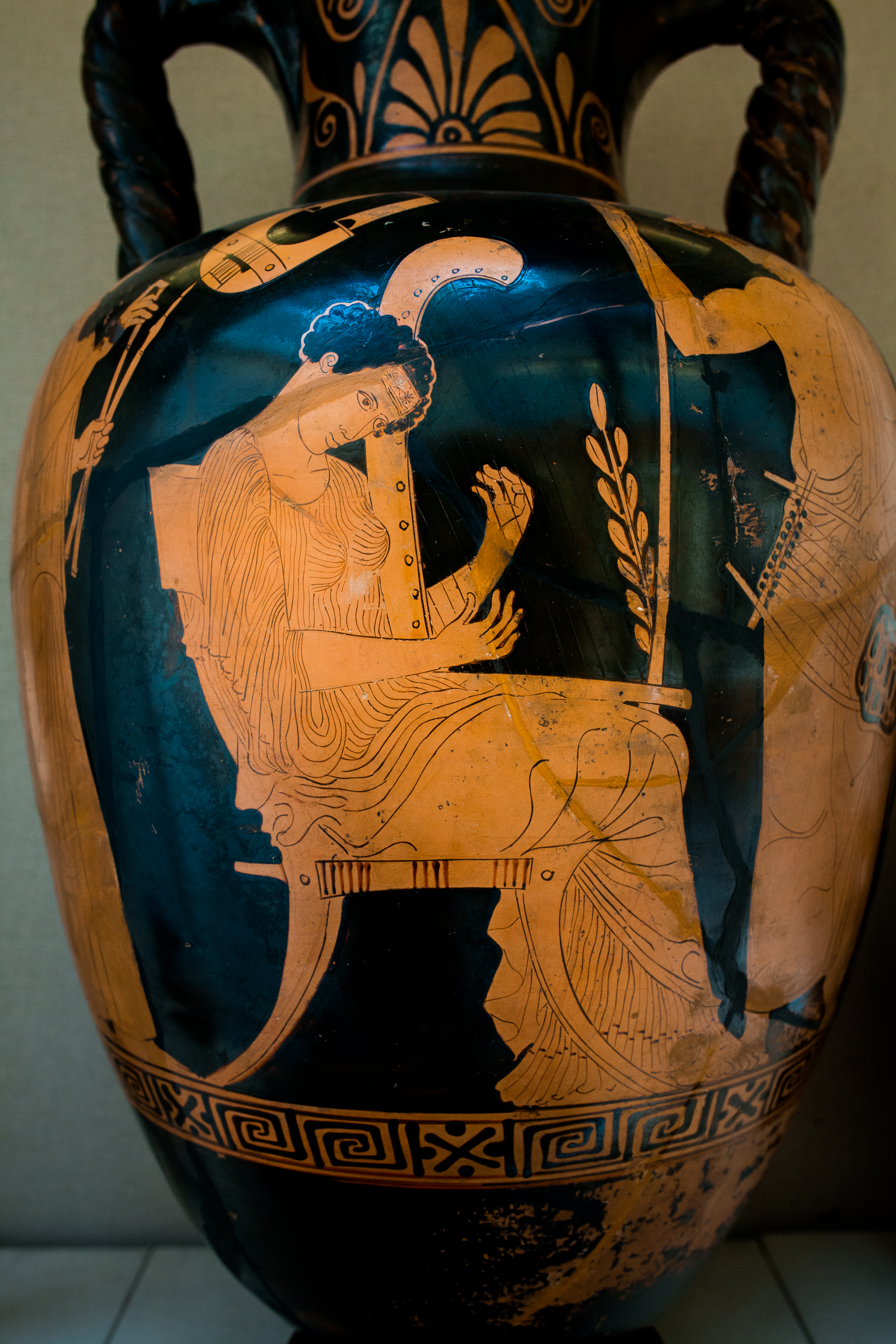
Image with harp considered possible trigonon in the Grove New Encyclopedia of Musical Instruments.

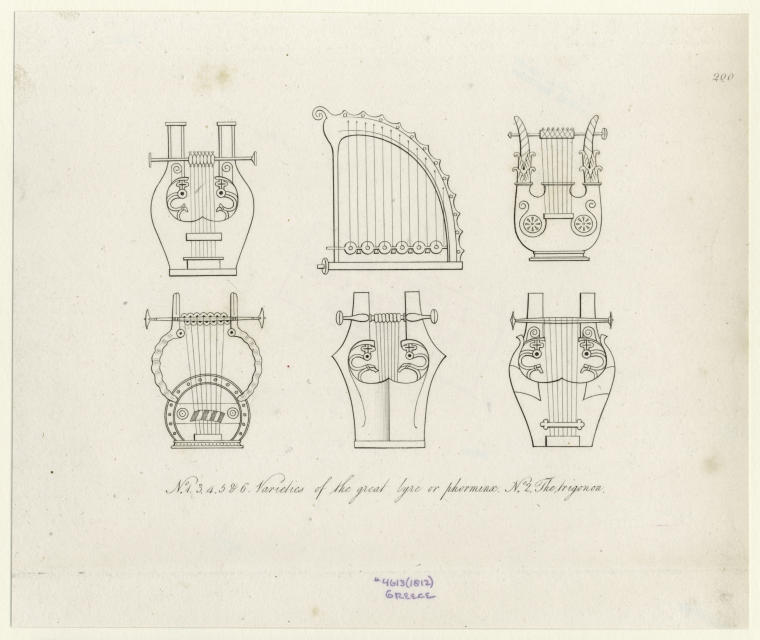
Varieties of the great lyre or phorminx; Number 2 is the trigonon. (1812). (center top) In the collection of the New York Public Library.
