= Psalterion =

Psalterion can refer to musical instruments, including:

- an Ancient Greek harp
- the medieval box zither Psaltery
