= Epigonion =

Ancient Greek harp-like instrument

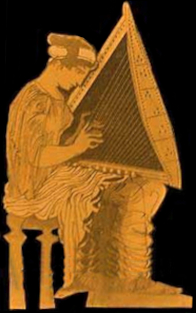
Epigonion Greek harp, circa 430 B.C. This style of harp is not named in artworks and has also been called trigonon by modern researchers.

The epigonion (Greek: ἐπιγόνιον) was an ancient stringed instrument, possibly a Greek harp mentioned in Athenaeus (183 AD), probably a psaltery.

== Description ==
The epigonion was invented, or at least introduced into Greece, by Epigonus of Ambracia, a Greek musician of Ambracia in Epirus, who was admitted to citizenship at Sicyon as a recognition of his great musical ability and of his having been the first to pluck the strings with his fingers, instead of using the plectrum. The instrument, which Epigonus named after himself, had forty strings.

It was undoubtedly a kind of harp or psaltery, since in an instrument of so many strings some must have been of different lengths, for tension and thickness only could hardly have produced forty different sounds, or even twenty, supposing that they were arranged in pairs of unisons. Strings of varying lengths require a frame like that of the harp, or of the Egyptian cithara which had one of the arms supporting the cross bar or zugon shorter than the other, or else strings stretched over harp-shaped bridges on a sound-board in the case of a psaltery.

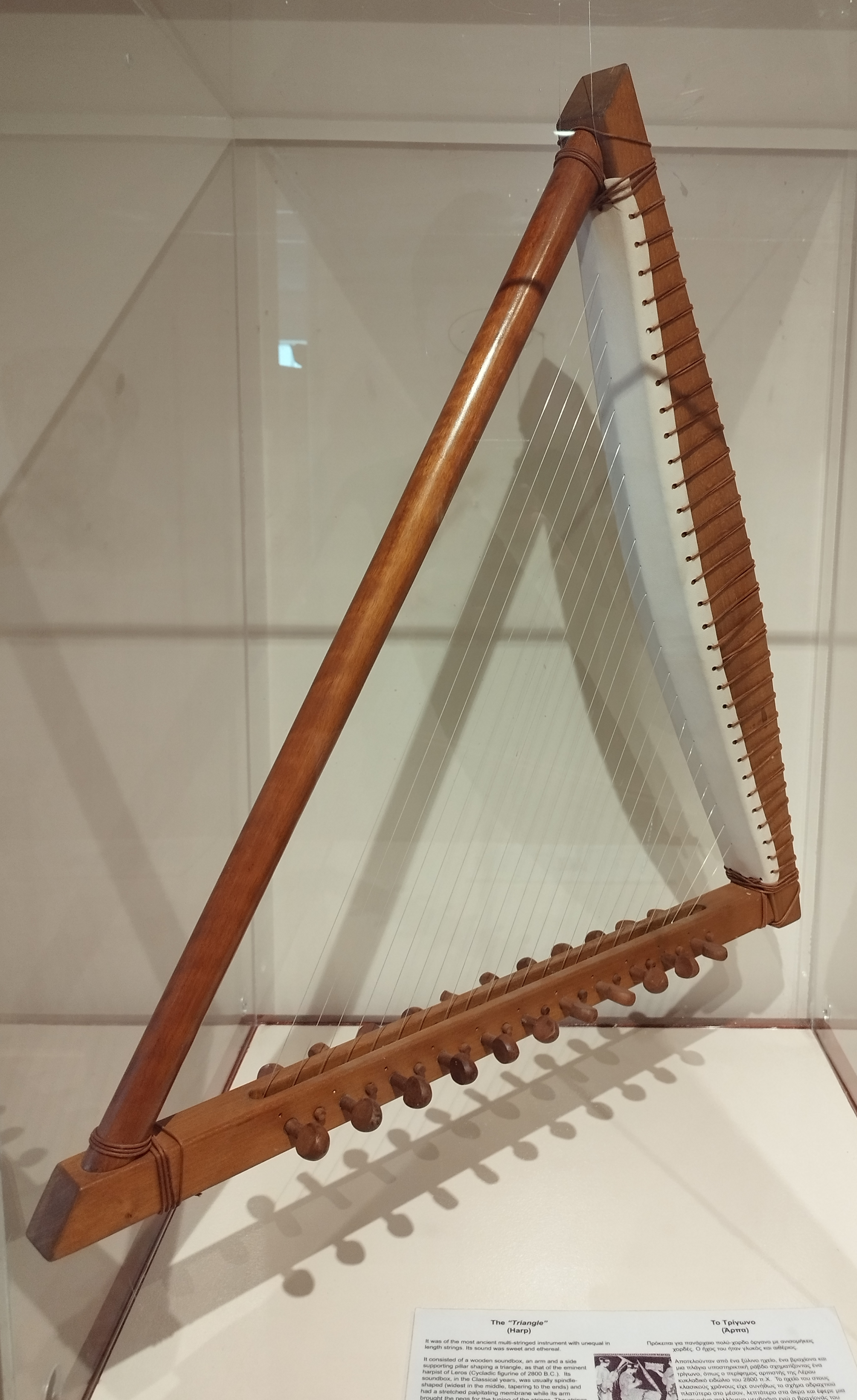
A modern reconstruction of an epigonion (trigonon), Kotsanas Museum of Ancient Greek Technology, Athens, Greece.

Juba II, king of Mauretania, who reigned from 30 BC, said that Epigonus brought the instrument from Alexandria and played upon it with the fingers of both hands, not only using it as an accompaniment to the voice, but introducing chromatic passages, and a chorus of other stringed instruments, probably citharas, to accompany the voice. Epigonus was also a skilled citharist and played with his bare hands without plectrum. Unfortunately, we have no record of when Epigonus lived. Vincenzo Galilei has given us a description of the epigonion accompanied by an illustration, representing his conception of the ancient instrument, an upright psaltery with the outline of the clavicytherium (but no keyboard).

== Virtual epigonion ==
In 2008, members of the Ancient Instruments Sound/Timbre Reconstruction Application (ASTRA) project used physical modeling synthesis to simulate the epigonion. The instrument was simulated using historical records and its audio output (music) was rendered digitally. The first digital audio rendering of the Epigonion, released by ASTRA, has a duration of one minute and 57 seconds and took about four hours to render. Due to the complexity of this process, the ASTRA project uses grid computing, to model sounds on hundreds of computers simultaneously.

The epigonion is part of the Lost Sounds Orchestra, alongside other ancient instruments which ASTRA has recreated the sounds for, including the salpinx, the aulos, the barbiton, and the syrinx.

=== Recordings ===
ASTRA describes the sound of their modelled epigonion as "metallic, crisp and bright, with a quite different timbre in the low and high range". Recordings ASTRA's reconstructed epigonion:

- Dufay recording
- Scarlatti Sonata in D Minor recording
- Scarlatti Sonata in G Major recording
