= Epigonus of Ambracia =

Epigonus of Ambracia (Ancient Greek: Ἐπίγονος Ἀμβρακιώτης; fl. 6th century BC) was a Greek musician from Ambracia in South Epirus, who was admitted to a citizenship at Sicyon, where he lived, performed and taught. The epigonion (string instrument) was invented, or at least introduced in Greece by Epigonus. He was a contemporary of Lasus of Hermione.
