= Sukkiim =

The Sukkiim (Hebrew: סֻכִּיִּים, Sukkīyyīm booth-dweller) or Sukkites were an ancient African nation, the inhabitants of Sûk. According to some theories, it would be the same Cushite people or some subgroup of the Cushite people (Kingdom of Kush). These peoples are mentioned in the Hebrew Bible in 2 Chronicles 12:3 as one of three African peoples (along with the Libyans and Ethiopians) who aided the Pharaoh Shishaq of Egypt when he invaded Judah and attacked Jerusalem. This is the only biblical reference to Sukkiim.

In the Septuagint, the Hebrew word Sukkiim is translated as Troglodytae. The Troglodytae were East Africans.

Some argue that, given the Hebrew name, they were more likely an Arab tribe. This is in part because "The Sukkiim may correspond to some one of the shepherd or wandering races mentioned on the Egyptian monuments, but we have not found any name in hieroglyphics resembling their name in the Bible, and this somewhat favors the opinion that it is a Shemitic appellation"

== See also ==
- History of Ethiopia
