= Sambuca (instrument) =

Ancient stringed instrument

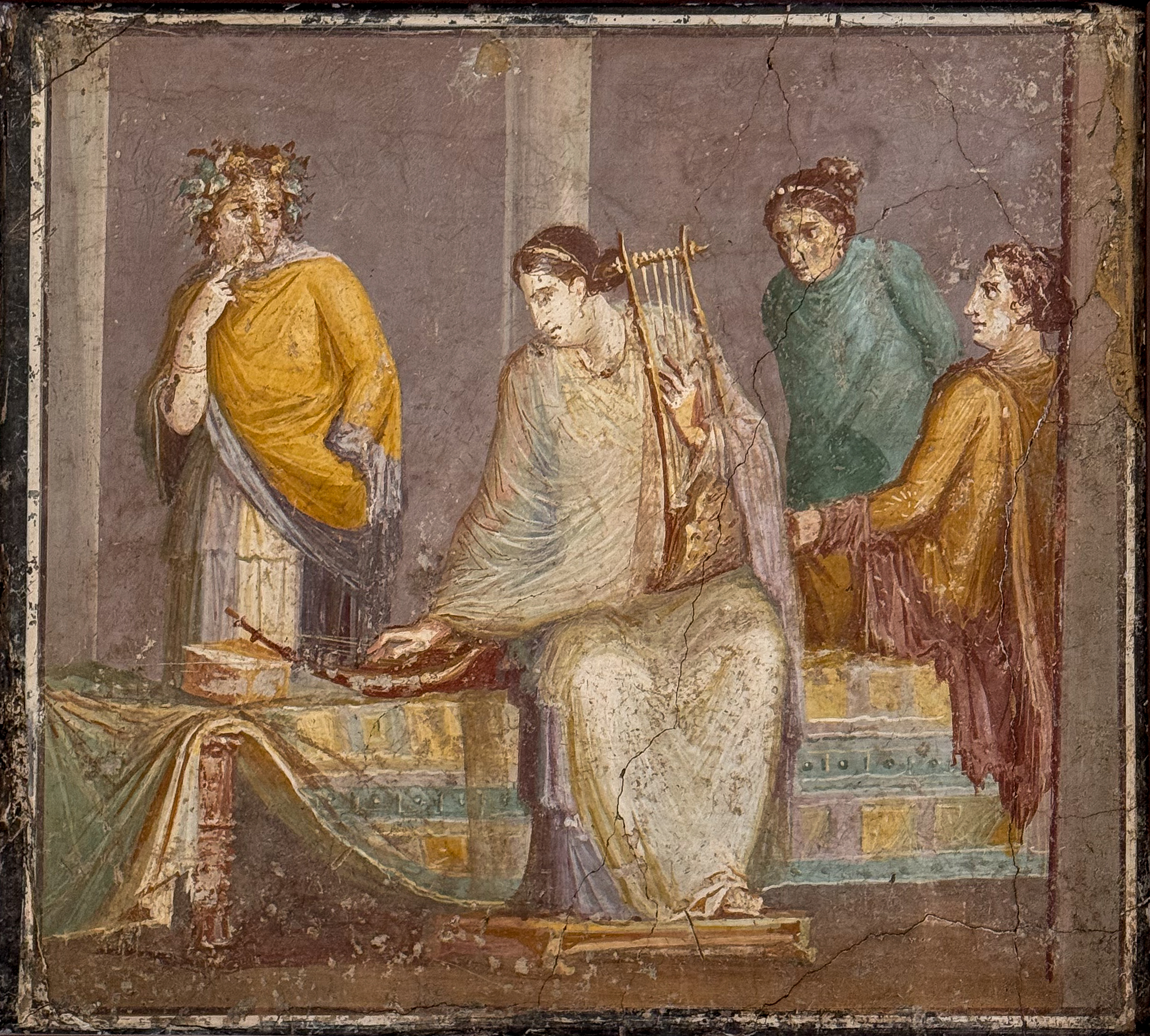
1st-century CE Roman fresco depicting women in a peristyle, listening to another woman play a kithara (on her knee) and sambuca (on the klinē). National Archaeological Museum, Naples

The sambuca (also sambute, sambiut, sambue, sambuque, or sambuke) was an ancient stringed instrument of Asiatic origin. The term sambuca is also applied to a number of other instruments.

== Original ==
The original sambuca is generally supposed to have been a small triangular ancient Greek harp of shrill tone, probably identical with Phoenician: sabecha and Imperial Aramaic: סַבְּכָא, romanized: sabbǝkhā, the Greek form being σαμβύκη or σαμβύχη or σαβύκη.

Eusebius wrote that the Troglodytae invented the sambuca, while Athenaeus wrote that the writer Semus of Delos said that the first person who used the sambuca was Sibylla, and that the instrument derives its name from a man named Sambyx who invented it. Athenaeus also wrote that Euphorion in his book on the Isthmian Games mentioned that Troglodytae used sambuca with four strings like the Parthians. He also add that the Magadis was an ancient instrument, but that in latter times it was altered, and had the name also changed to that of the sambuca.

The sambuca has been compared to the siege engine of the same name by some classical writers; Polybius likens it to a rope ladder; others describe it as boat-shaped. Among the musical instruments known, the Egyptian enanga best answers to these descriptions, which are doubtless responsible for the medieval drawings representing the sambuca as a kind of tambourine, for Isidore of Seville elsewhere defines the symphonia as a tambourine.

The sabka is mentioned in the Bible (Daniel 3 verses 5 to 15). In the King James Bible it is erroneously translated as "sackbut".

== Ancient sources ==
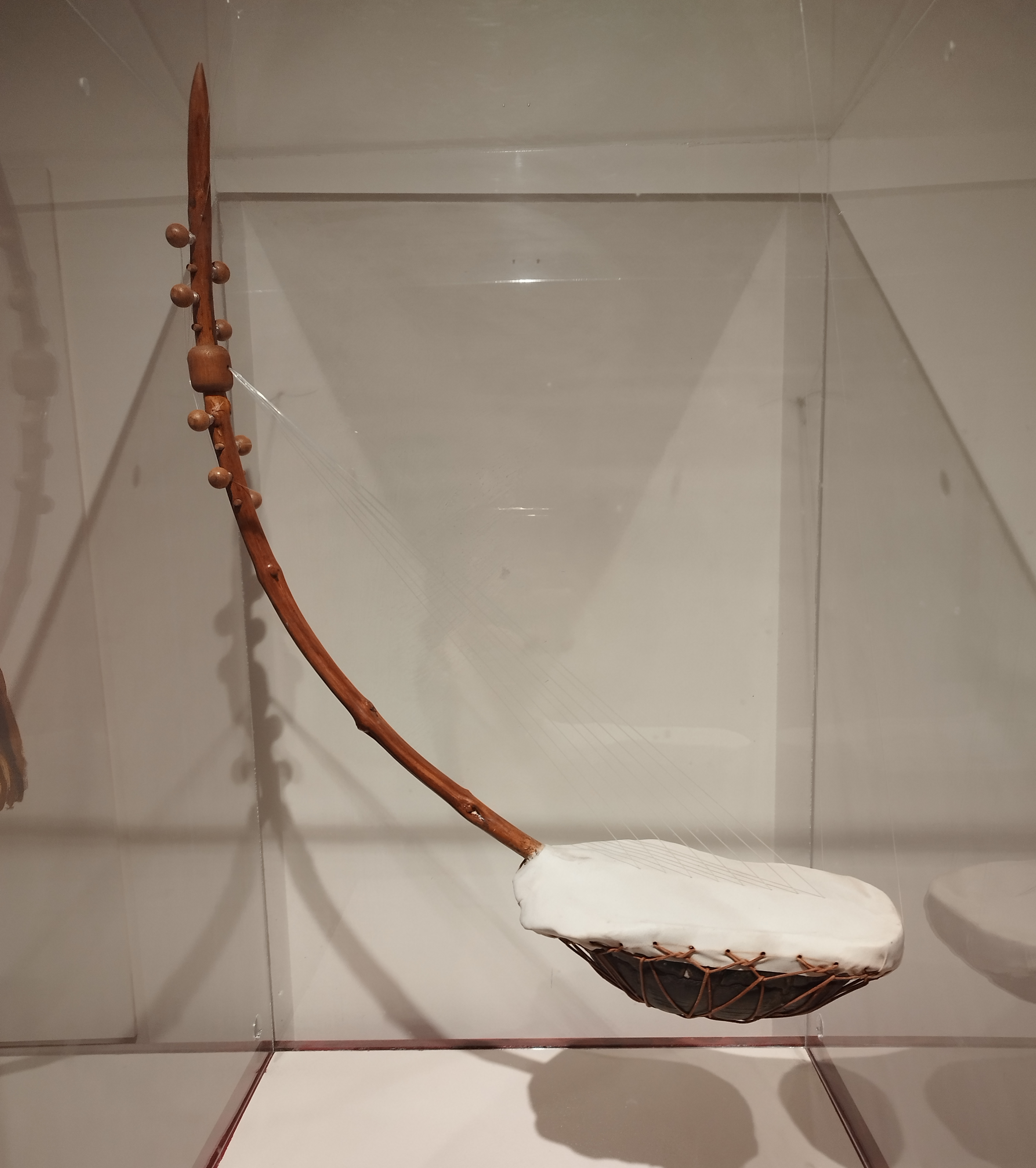
Reconstruction of a sambuca in Museum of Ancient Greek Technology, Athens, Greece

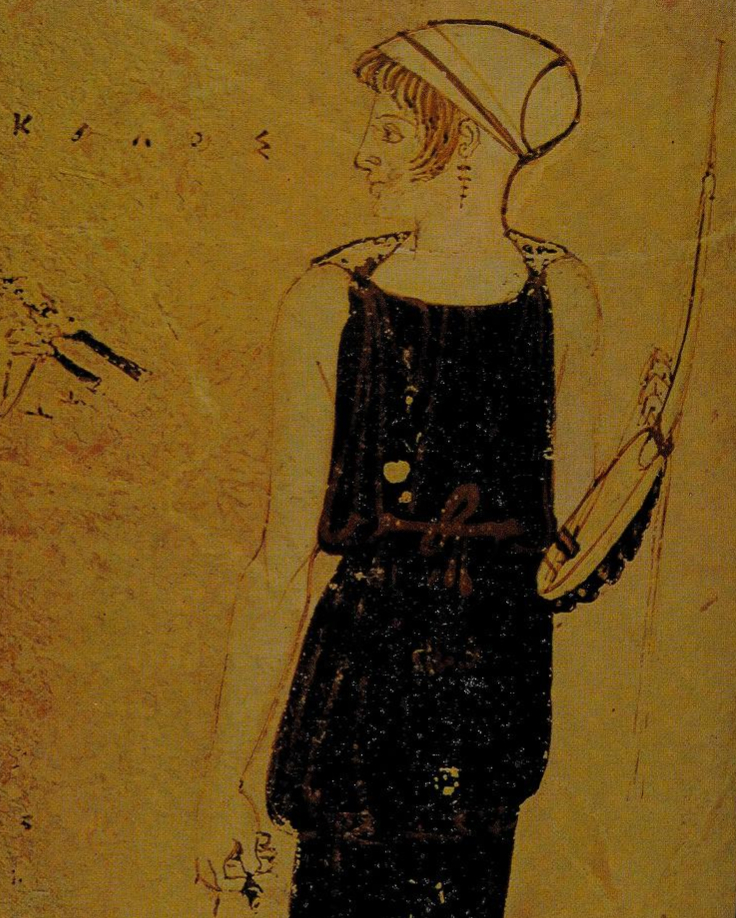
Another possible sambuca arched harp in Greek art, from the 5th century B.C.

Ancient descriptions of the sambuca survive in the works of Athenaeus, Polybius, Eusebius, and other authors. In Book XIV of the Deipnosophistae, Athenaeus records several traditions concerning the instrument's origin and configuration, citing the poet Euphorion and the philosopher Pythagoras of Rhegium:

And Masurius said that the sambuca was a musical instrument, very shrill, and that it was mentioned by Euphorion in his book on the Isthmian Games; for he says that it was used by the Parthians and by the Troglodytes, and that it had four strings. He said also that it was mentioned by Pythagoras in his treatise on the Red Sea.

— Deipnosophistae by Athenaeus, Athenaeus, Deipnosophistae 14.633–634, Translated by Charles Duke Yonge (1854)

Athenaeus further compiles conflicting accounts of its invention from Semus of Delos and church tradition:

Semus of Delos, in the first book of his Delias, says that the first person who used the sambuca was Sibylla, from whom also the instrument derived its name, as it was invented by a man named Sambyx.

— Delias by Semus of Delos, Athenaeus, Deipnosophistae 14.637, Translated by Charles Duke Yonge (1854)

Eusebius records an alternative tradition attributing its creation to African peoples: "The Troglodytae invented the sambuca, a stringed instrument." In Book IV of his Onomasticon, the 2nd-century grammarian Julius Pollux categorizes the sambuca among high-pitched stringed instruments (trigona and sambykai) of foreign provenance.

== Other instruments ==
During the Middle Ages the word "sambuca" was applied to:

1. a stringed instrument, about which little can be discovered
2. a hurdy-gurdy, a hand-cranked stringed musical instrument from the Middle Ages, sometimes called a sambuca or sambuca rotata
3. a wind instrument made from the wood of the elder tree (sambūcus).

In an old glossary article on vloyt (flute), the sambuca is said to be a kind of flute:

Sambuca vel sambucus est quaedam arbor parva et mollis, unde haec sambuca est quaedam species symphoniae qui fit de illa arbore.

Translation:

sambuca or sambucus are soft and pliant trees, and from the sambucus is named one of the symphonia family of instruments, which is made from [the wood of] these trees.

Isidore of Seville describes it in his Etymologiae as:

Sambuca in musicis species est symphoniarum. Est enim genus ligni fragilis unde et tibiae componuntur.

Translation:

The sambuca is in the symphonia family of musical instruments. It is also a kind of softwood from which these pipes are made.

In a glossary by Papias of Lombardy (c. 1053), first printed at Milan in 1476, the sambuca is described as a kithara, which in that century was generally glossed "harp": "Sambuca, cytherae rusticae" (Sambucas, simple harps).

In Tristan (lines 7563–7572) when the knight is enumerating to King Marke all the instruments upon which he can play, the sambiut is the last mentioned:

Waz ist daz, lieber mann?
– Daz veste Seitspiel daz ich kann.

Translation:

What is this now, you free man?
– It's the Seitspiel, yes, I can.

A Latin–French glossary has the equivalence Psalterium = sambue. During the later Middle Ages sambuca was often translated "sackbut" in the vocabularies, whether merely from the phonetic similarity of the two words has not yet been established.

The great Boulogne Psalter (11th century) contains many fanciful instruments which are evidently intended to illustrate the equally vague and fanciful descriptions of instruments in the apocryphal letter of Saint Jerome, ad Dardanum ("to Dardanus"). Among these is a Sambuca, which resembles a somewhat primitive sackbut without the bell joint. In the 19th century it was reproduced by Edmond de Coussemaker, Charles de la Croix and Eugène Emmanuel Viollet-le-Duc, and has given rise to endless discussions without leading to any satisfactory solution.

Fabio Colonna created the pentecontachordon, a keyboard instrument which he called a sambuca.
