= Forest Bull =

Mythological animal

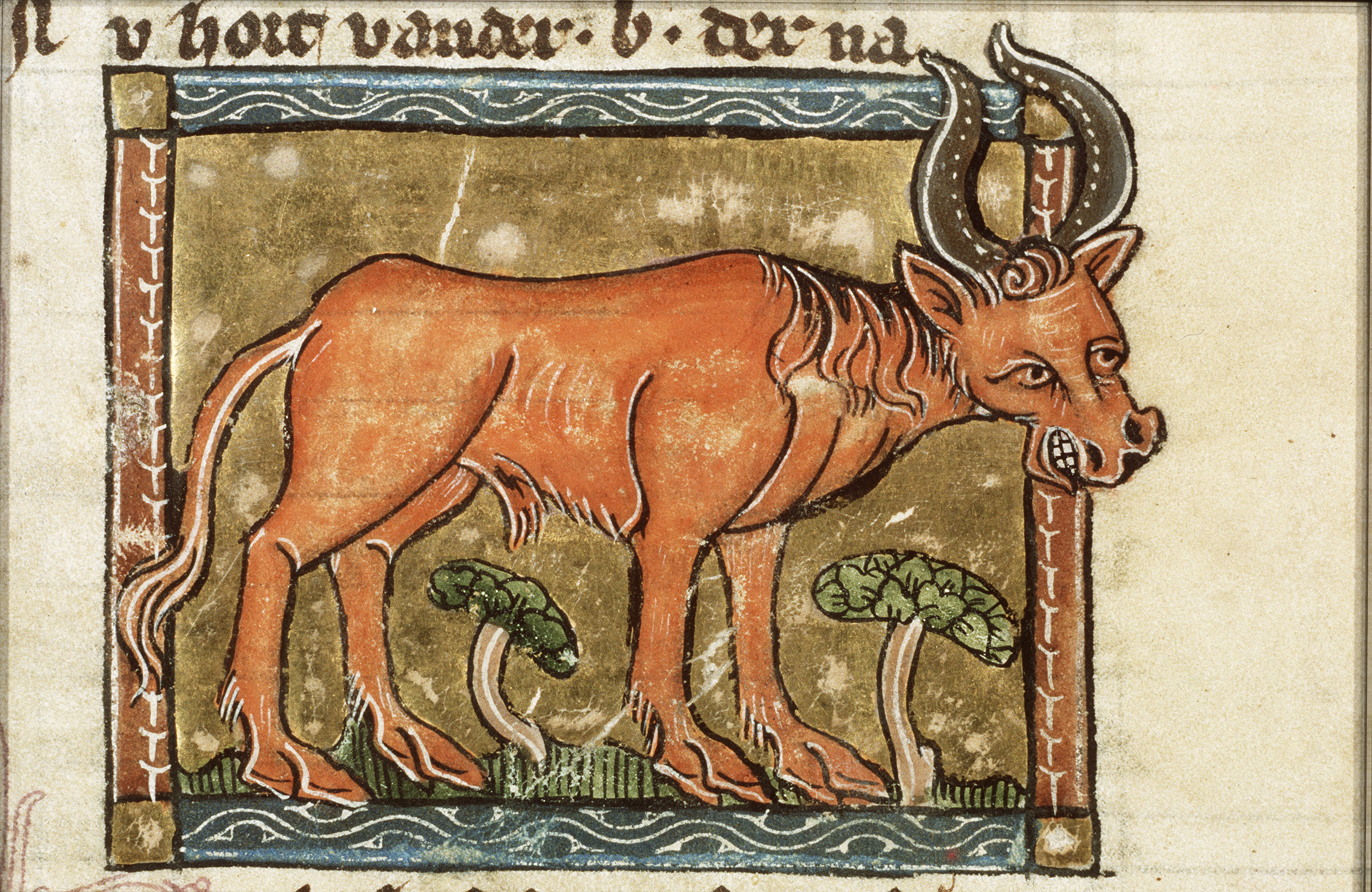
Red buffalo from Der Naturen Bloeme by Jacob van Maerlant (c. 1340s)

The Forest Bull, also known Ethiopian Bull (Ancient Greek: Ταῦρος Αἰθιοπικός) and Ethiopian Forest Bull (Latin: Taurus Aethiopicus Sylvestris), is an animal from ancient and medieval bestiaries. According to Pliny the Elder, they were a breed of ferocious, tawny cattle living in Ethiopia, with mouths gaping open to the ears. Their horns, like a Yale's, could swivel in any direction. To fight, they raised them, after which the horns remained in this position. According to Aelian, they were called "flesh eaters" and were the most ferocious and savage of all animals. They were twice the size of regular bulls and could run at great speeds. He cites their hair as being red. No weapon could physically hurt the bulls, be it spears or arrows because even iron deflected from their skin. The forest bulls hunted herds of wild animals and horses. To protect their flocks, herdsmen who lived in the area dug deep ditches, in which the bulls would fall and consequently choke on their rage. The Troglodytae (cave-dwellers), a nearby tribe, supposedly "judged [this] to be the king of beasts, and rightly so, for it possesses the courage of a lion, the speed of a horse, the strength of a bull, and is stronger than iron."

== See also ==
- Yale (mythical creature)
- African forest buffalo
