= Magadis =

String instrument

The magadis (Ancient Greek: Μάγαδις) was an ancient Greek musical instrument, possibly a Greek harp or Lyre. It is usually believed to be a stringed instrument similar to a psaltery or harp, though some earlier sources like the translated fragments of Posidonius discuss arguments that it may have been a woodwind. Modern scholars have mostly accepted the string instrument classification while noting that the evidence from ancient texts "falls well short of proving it." Scholars believe the word may be Lydian in origin.

== Background ==
Archaic writers like Alkman and Anakreon mention both magadis and pektis.

According to Aristoxenos magadis and pektis were the same instrument; if this is correct magadis would have been associated with dancing or serenades as the pektis was, however, direct literary evidence about the magadis and its role in society is lacking.

Euphorion wrote that the magadis was an ancient instrument, but that in latter times it was altered, and had the name also changed to that of the Sambuca. Adding that it was popular on Lesbos and that a sculptor named Lesbothemis (Λεσβοθέμις), about whom little else is known, depicted one of the muses holding the magadis.

Menaechmus (Μέναιχμος), in his treatise on Artists, said that the pektis (πηκτὶς), which he called identical with the magadis, was invented by Sappho.

Scholars have said it is an invention of the Lydians or Thracians.

There is a discussion in Deipnosophistae ("Sophists at Dinner") about whether the magadis is a harp-like string instrument or a woodwind similar to the aulos or kithara with those involved eventually reaching agreement that it was a string instrument. The gathered company then turn to the question of whether the instrument is of Lydian origin beginning a sharp dispute between Athenaeus and Posidonius.

== Verses ==
Anakreon's verse indicates the magadis was a plucked string instrument:

Holding the magadis I pluck its twenty strings;
But you, Leukaspis, are in the bloom of youth

According to Aristoxenos (as quoted by Athenaeus), the "twenty strings" mentioned by Anakreon would have been plucked without a plectrum. The skill of a magadis player is described in a dithyramb by Telestes:

Each man hurling forth a different sound from the others
Roused up the horn-voiced magadis
Turning his hand quickly back and forth across
Five-staved joinings of the strings
Like a runner at the turning post

Scholars have speculated whether "horn-voiced" (keratophonon) could be a reference to plucking of strings with a plectrum, or perhaps a reference to the tone of the instrument, or a structural element of the instrument. Xenophon mentions Thracian soldiers playing ox-hide trumpets (salpinyxin omoboeias) in what he calls the "manner of the magadis".
