= Troglodytae =

Legendary cave dwelling tribe in Greco-Roman historiography

The Troglodytae (Greek: Τρωγλοδύται, Trōglodytai, literally "cave goers") were people mentioned in various locations by many ancient Greek and Roman geographers and historians, including Herodotus (5th century BCE), Agatharchides (2nd century BCE), Diodorus Siculus (1st century BCE), Strabo (64/63 BCE – c. 24 CE), Pliny (1st century CE), Josephus (37 – c. 100 CE), Tacitus (c. 56 – after 117 CE), Claudius Aelianus (c. 175 CE – c. 235 CE), Porphyry (c. 234 CE – c. 305 CE).

== Greco-Roman period ==
In the Periplus of the Erythraean Sea the name Troglodytica refers to the native people in the region of Berenice Troglodytica, as "Troglodytai" or "cave dwellers". Although the name is attested by several ancient writers, the more ancient Ptolemaic inscriptions read Trogodytai, which Huntingford (1980)[6] speculated could be derived from the same root as Tuareg. It is possible that later copyists confused this name with the more common term Troglodytai.

=== In Herodotus ===
Herodotus referred to the Troglodytae in his Histories as being a people hunted by the Garamantes in Libya. He said that the Troglodytae were the swiftest runners of all humans known and that they ate snakes, lizards, and other reptiles. He also stated that their language was unlike any known to him, and sounded like the screeching of bats. Alice Werner (1913) believed (in passing) that this was a clear allusion to the early Khoisan, indigenous inhabitants of Southern Africa, because their languages contain distinctive click sounds.

=== In Aristotle ===
According to Aristotle (Hist. An. viii. 12) a dwarfish race of Troglodytes dwelt on the upper course of the Nile, who possessed horses and were in his opinion the Pygmies of fable.

=== In Diodorus ===
In ancient writing, apparently the best known of the African cave-dwellers were the inhabitants of the "Troglodyte country" (Ancient Greek: Τρωγλοδυτική) on the coast of the Red Sea, as far north as the Greek port of Berenice, of whom an account was preserved by Diodorus Siculus from Agatharchides of Cnidus, and by Artemidorus Ephesius in Strabo. They were a pastoral people, living entirely on the flesh of their herds, or, in the season of fresh pasture, on mingled milk and blood.

=== In Strabo ===
In his work Geographica, Strabo mentions a tribe of Troglodytae living along with the Crobyzi in Scythia Minor, near the Ister (Danube) and the Greek colonies of Callatis and Tomis. He also mentions tribes living in various parts of Africa from Libya to the Red Sea.

=== In Pomponius Mela ===
In his work Chorographia, Pomponius Mela mentions that they own no resources, and rather than speak, they make a high-pitched sound. They creep around deep in caves and are nurtured by serpents.

=== In Athenaeus ===
In his work Deipnosophists, Athenaeus wrote that Pythagoras who wrote about the Red Sea mentioned that they make their pandura out of the white mangrove which grows in the sea and that Euphorion in his book on the Isthmian Games mentioned that they played sambucas with four strings like the Parthians.

=== In Claudius Aelianus ===
In his work On the Characteristics of Animals, Claudius Aelianus mentions that the tribe of Troglodytae are famous and derive their name from their manner of living. He also adds that they eat snakes. Furthermore, he wrote that Troglodytes believe that the king of the beasts is the Ethiopian Bull, because it possesses the courage of a lion, the speed of a horse, the strength of a bull, and is stronger than iron.

=== In Josephus ===
Flavius Josephus alludes to a place he calls Troglodytis while discussing the account in Genesis, that after the death of Sarah, Abraham married Keturah and fathered six sons who in turn fathered many more. "Now, for all these sons and grandsons, Abraham contrived to settle them in colonies; and they took possession of Troglodytis, and the country of Arabia Felix..."

The Troglodytis Josephus refers to here is generally taken to mean both coasts of the Red Sea. However, Josephus goes on to state that the descendants of one of these grandsons, Epher, invaded Libya, and that the name of Africa was thus derived from that of Epher. The dominant modern hypothesis is that Africa stems from the Berber word ifri (plural ifran), meaning "cave", in reference to cave dwellers.

=== In Clement of Alexandria ===
Clement of Alexandria (The Stromata, Book I, chapter xvi) mentions them as inventors of the sambuca.

=== In Eusebius ===
Eusebius, citing Clement of Alexandria, also credits them with the invention of the sambuca.

== See also ==
- Afri, singular Afer – a Latin name for the inhabitants of the Africa Province
- Blemmyes – a nomadic Beja tribal kingdom (at least 600 BCE – 3rd century CE)
- Ichthyophagi – name given by ancient geographers to several coast-dwelling peoples in different parts of the world
- Midian – area in the northwest Arabian Peninsula mentioned in the Hebrew Bible and the Koran, and associated with Ptolemy's Modiana
- Zimran – the first son of Abraham and Keturah; their descendants are said by Josephus to have settled "Troglodytis" and Arabia Felix
- Hijaz – the mountains on the Arabian coast of the Red Sea identified by Josephus
- Thamud – a once-powerful nation occupying the northern tip of the Hijaz known for their cave-dwelling
- Horites – a people of the northern Hijaz with an etymology of digging a hole for a den
- Wadi Feiran – another name associated with the Hijaz and northwestern Arabia, the root "F-ˀA-R" means "mouse" and "burrowing like a mouse"
- Chimpanzee – a great ape whose scientific name, P. troglodytes comes from the Troglodytae, out of an incorrect belief they lived and slept in caverns.
- Sukkiim – some scholars assert that these peoples, referenced in 2 Chronicles 12:3, are the same peoples called Troglodytae
