= Ancient Greek harps =

Plucked instruments

Psalterion
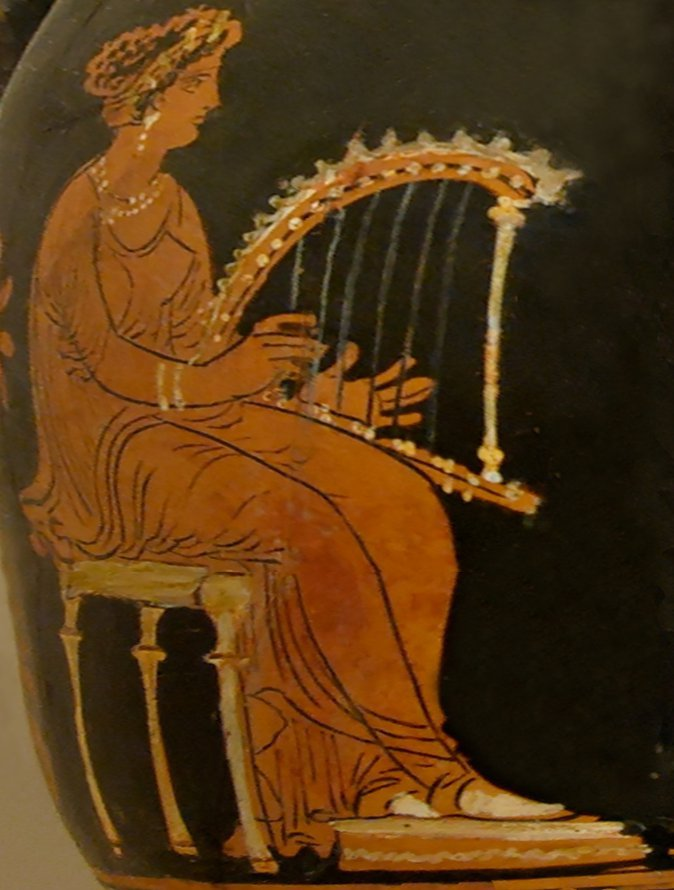
- Woman playing triangular frame-harp, a psaltērion or trigōnon, in red-figure pottery from Apulia, ca. 320–310 BC C. Anzi (British Museum).

String instrument
- Other names: Psalterion (ψαλτήριον); Trigonos (of Phrygia, Syria, or Egypt; Pektis (an angular harp of Lydia), Magadis (an angular harp of Lydia), Sambuca (an angular harp of "foreign origin"), Epigonion (ἐπιγόνειον)
- Classification: Plucked string instrument
- Hornbostel–Sachs classification: 322: 322.1 Open harps – The harp has no pillar.; 322.11 Arched harps.; 322.12 Angular harps; 322.2 Frame harps – The harp has a pillar (Harps, the plane of the strings lies perpendicular to the resonator's surface; the harp has a pillar.)
- Developed: Ancient Greece with possible input from Egypt and nearby Asia

The psalterion (Greek ψαλτήριον) is a stringed, plucked instrument, an ancient Greek harp. Psalterion was a general word for harps in the latter part of the 4th century B.C. It meant "plucking instrument".

In addition to their most important stringed instrument, the seven-stringed lyre, the Greeks also used multi-stringed, finger-plucked instruments: harps. The general name for these was the psalterion. Ancient vase paintings often depict – almost always in the hands of women – various types of harps. Names found in written sources include pektis, trigonos, magadis, sambuca, epigonion. These names could denote instruments of this type.

Unlike the lyres, the harp was rarely used in Greece. It was seen as an "outside instrument" from the Orient. It also touched on Greek social mores, being used mainly by women, both upper-class women as well as hetaerae entertainers. There was a group of women known as psaltriai, female pluckers of the instrument who could be hired for parties. Anacreon, poet of drinking and love (and infatuation, disappointment, revelry, parties, festivals, and observations of everyday people), sang of playing the Lydian harp and pektis in his works.

The "most important" harps were the psaltêrion, the mágadis and the pēktis. The Latin equivalent of the word, psalterium, has been the name of many-stringed box zithers or board zithers since the Middle Ages.

== History ==
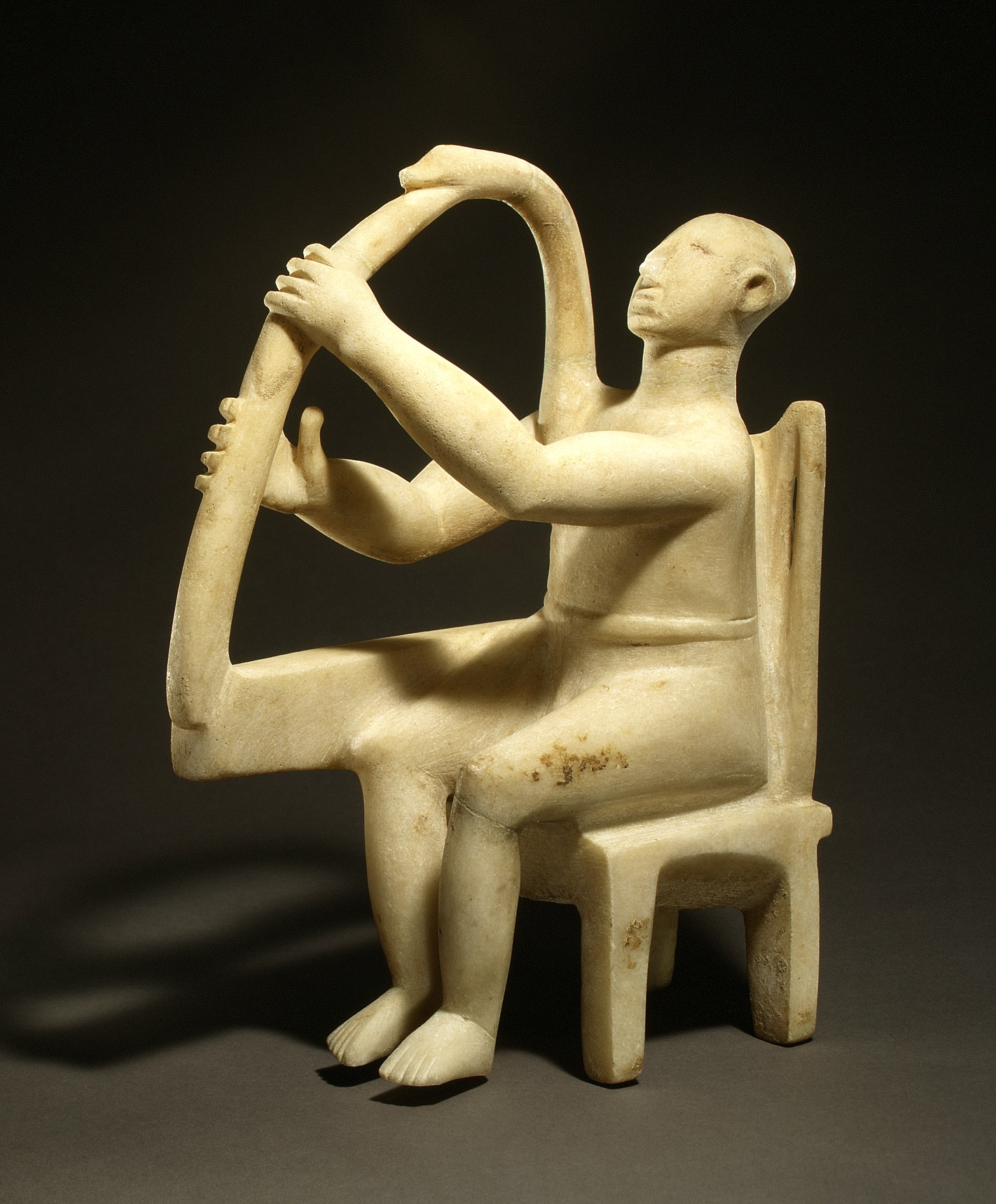
Cycladic culture harp player, 2800~2700 BCE.

Harps probably evolved from the most ancient type of stringed instrument, the musical bow. In its simplest version, the sound body of the bowed harp and its neck, which grows out as an extension, form a continuous bow similar to an up-bowed bow, with the strings connecting the ends of the bow. Such an instrument was already used by the Sumerians around 3400 BCE and the Egyptians in 2500 BCE.

In Mesopotamia around 2000 BCE, a new type of harp, the angular harp, took its place; it appeared in Egypt after a few centuries later. In the angular harp, the neck of the instrument is connected to the body at a right angle, and in later periods at an acute angle. This type is from the 2nd millennium BCE, and it also appears in Cypriot depictions.

In the Aegean Sea area, in the 3rd millennium BCE, the Cycladic culture left behind marble figurines depicting men with harps. These are the oldest representations known in the history of musical instruments in which a frame harp can be recognized. They show a harp whose body and neck are connected by a third element, a column, thereby completing the complete triangular shape of the instrument. Researchers believe that they discovered a similar instrument on some of the seal presses of the Minoan civilization from the period between 1900 and 1700 BCE.

In the following thousand years, in the Greek Bronze Age and then in the early Iron Age, there are hardly any traces of the harp in the Aegean region. The first data appears around 600 BCE, and in the Greek visual arts the harp appears from the middle of the 5th century BCE. Written sources link the harp to Asia Minor, in Lydia.

The Romans never accepted the harp, and its occurrence in iconography is exceptional. There was no word for harp in Latin. Juvenal describes it as chordæ obliquæ ("oblique strings").

The European harp of the Middle Ages, and today, can be considered to be related to the Greek psalterion based only on its musical classification; it is apparently based on a tradition radically different from the Greek tradition, and is probably of Celtic origin.

== Differences between Greek vs. modern harps ==
Compared to modern European harps, Greek angular and frame harps stand "upside down" when used. Their position is just the opposite of that which is common with today's western harps; the thin bar-shaped neck rests horizontally on the left thigh of the seated musician, while the body of the instrument connected to it is curved along the musician's upper body, stretching and widening and bending back towards the end. The strings sit vertically, the shorter, higher-tuned strings closer to the musician, the lower ones further away. At the bottom of the neck, each string is connected to a leather ring (like the tuning ring known from the Greek lyres) that enables tuning. Sometimes there is a second bar under this bar, parallel to it, perhaps taking some of the load and protecting the tuning rings from moving while playing.

== Harps in paintings and vases ==
Bow harps

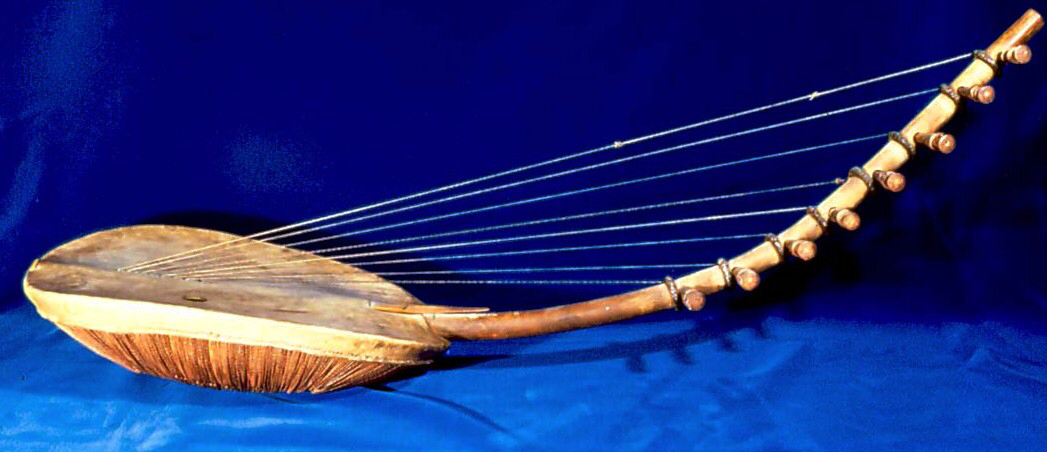
Ennanga harp, 19th century, Ganda people of Ughanda.

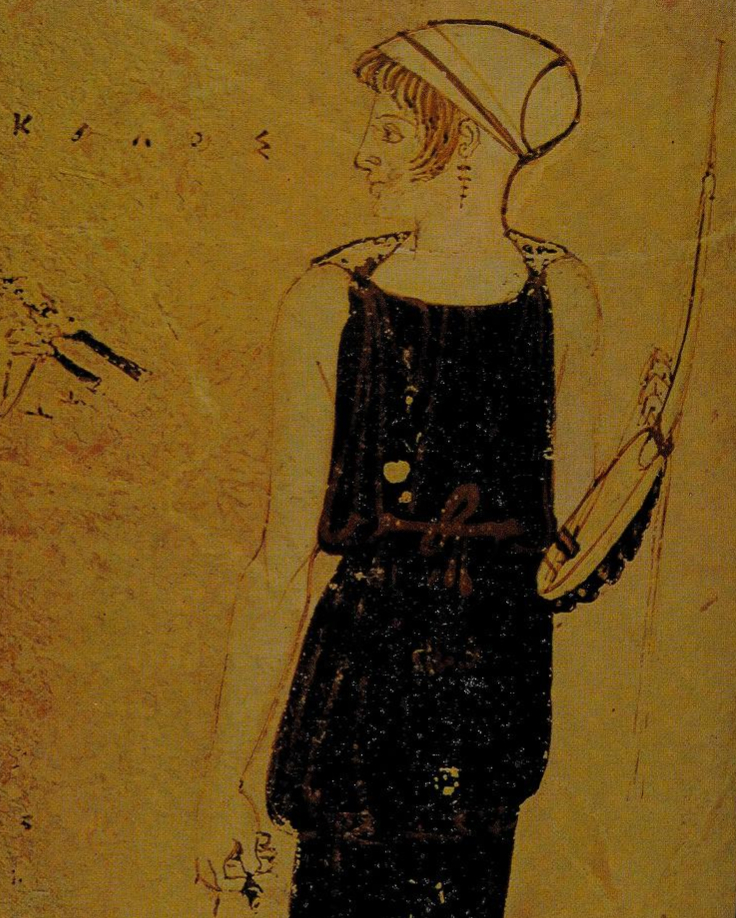
A greek bow harp from the 5th century B.C. Possible sambuca.

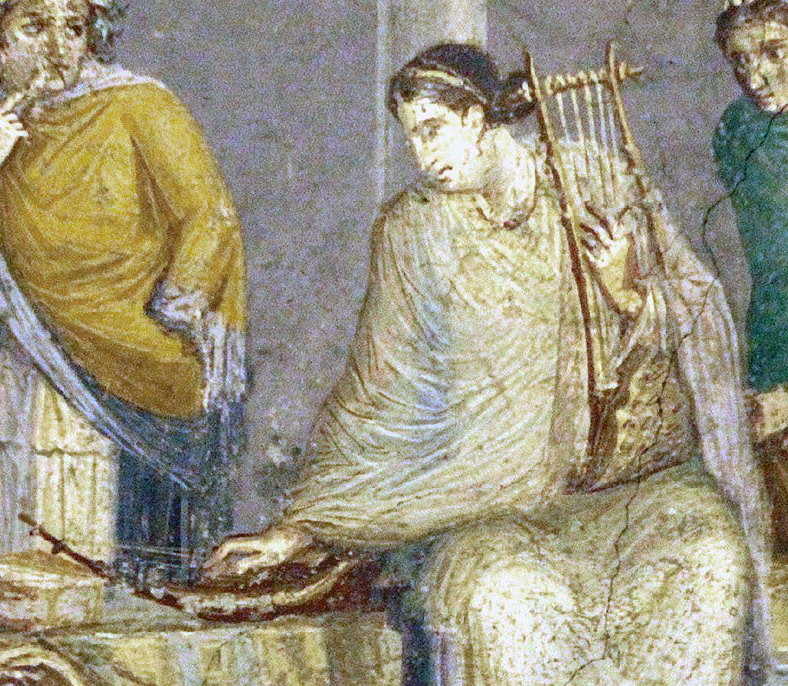
Woman with kithara (right) and sambuca (left). Roman fresco from Pompeii, 1st century CE.

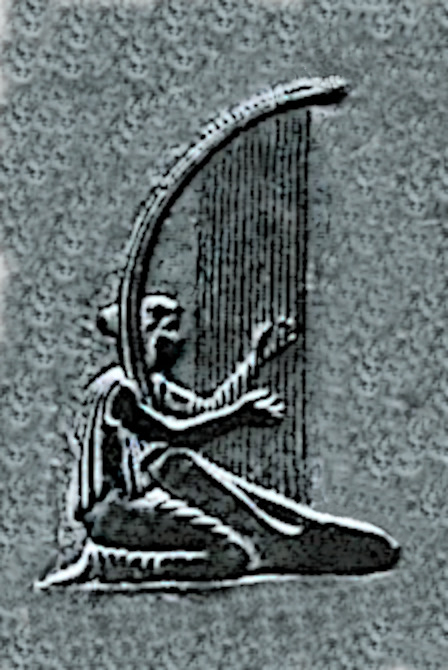
Greek vertical bow harp, c. 5th century BCE.

In the ancient Greek representations and vase paintings from the second half of the 5th century BC, harps appear in a variety of forms: there have been mentioned three distinct types: angular harps, frame harps, and spindle harps. A fourth type also existed: arched harps or bow harps.

=== Bow harps ===
Bow harps, a type of arched harp, form a half-oval or half-circle shape without sharp angles. The Egyptians had tall vertical bow harps and smaller harps held horizontally. The images of small bow harps in Greek paintings are similar to the smaller Egyptian bow harps or the modern African enanga.

The Greeks used the tall vertical bow-harp, but rarely. It has been found in a single work of art, according to Curt Sachs. An image of that harp was published in the Colour Encyclopedia of Musical Instruments by Alexander Buchner, Prague, 1980

=== Angular harps ===
Angular harps

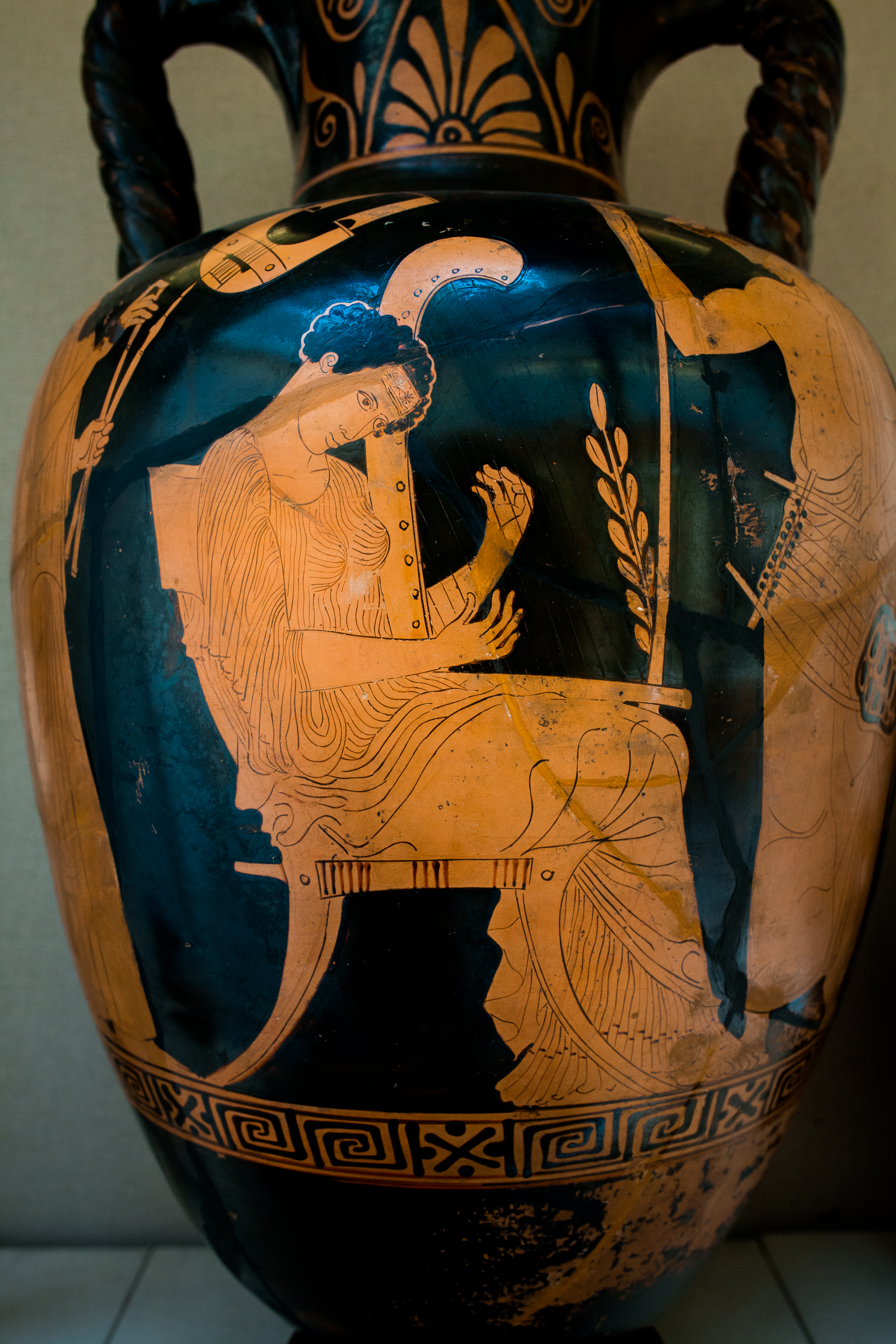
Open angular-harp. Image with open-harp considered possible trigonon in the Grove New Encyclopedia of Musical Instruments.

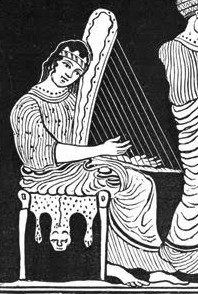
Open angular-harp. A muse with a harp. Text following image: "The trigonon consisted originally of an angular frame..."

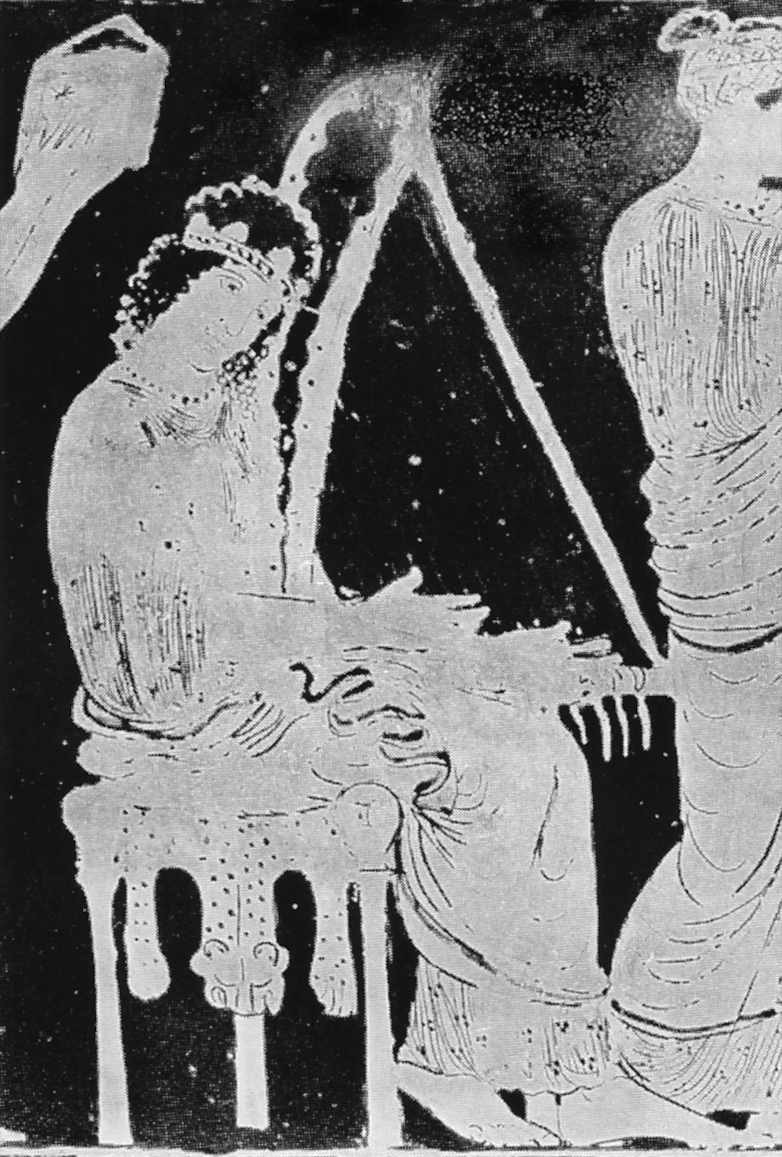
Muse with a harp. The photo of the painted vase shows that the open angular harp was a frame harp. 5th century B.C.

One type is an open angular harp, i.e., a type of harp whose neck and body form an angle with each other with no column to form the third side of the triangle. This was a typical pattern for Asian harps.

=== Frame harps ===
Another type is very similar to the previous one, but a significant difference is that it is a frame harp, so a column connects the ends of the neck and body. Such a solution enables a higher string load and, consequently, a higher volume.

==== "Spindle" Harp ====
Spindle harps

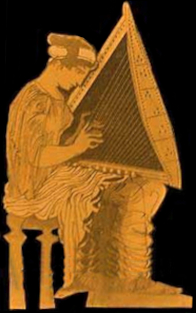
Epigonion, c. 430 B.C. This instruct has also been called the trigonon.

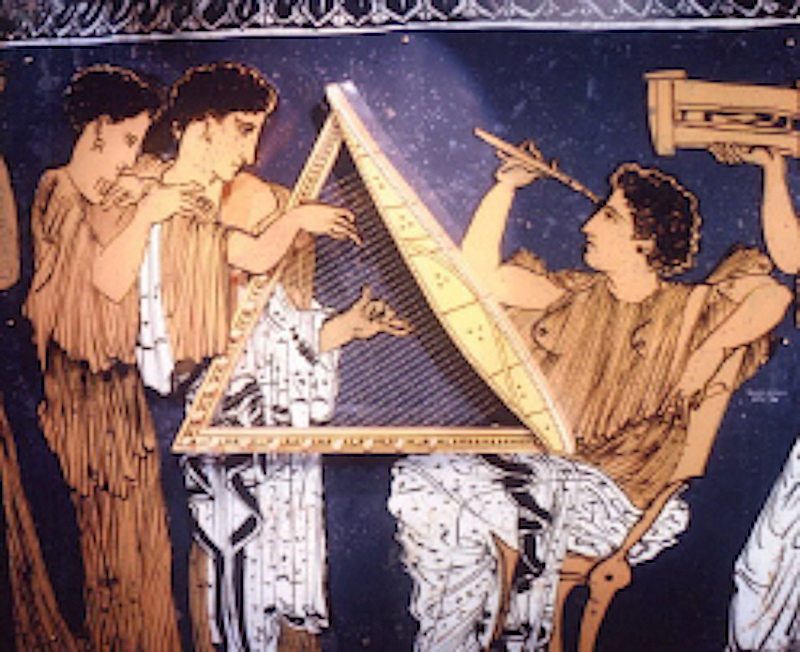
Epigonion, 430 B.C. with a symmetrical belly. From a red-figure nuptial basin by the Lautros Painter (430BC). Athens National Archaeological Museum.

A spindle harp is a frame harp shaped like an isosceles triangle. The soundboard's body is spindle-shaped, bulging in the middle and tapers at the ends. The shape may have been an awareness of acoustic properties, which are now labeled "exponential string-length distribution", used in the shape of modern concert harps.

The third type, the spindle harp, appears on vase paintings only until the end of the 5th century. Similar to the previous types, the thin, bar-like neck of the instrument is horizontal with the tuning apparatus below. Still, surprisingly here, the column is closer to the musician's body; the spindle-shaped (tapering at each end) body forms the far side of the instrument's triangle. The longer, deeper tuned strings are thus closer to the musician, the high ones further away.

In one representation of the spindle-harp, the strings are not vertical but diagonal, so that the longest string runs from the apex of the triangle, where the neck and column meet, to the center of the spindle-like body, with increasingly shorter strings running parallel to it on both sides. This could also be the painter's mistake, but it is not without a certain logic: the deepest string runs to the widest, most deeply resonating part of the body, and the others run to ever-thinning parts of the body, according to their tuning.

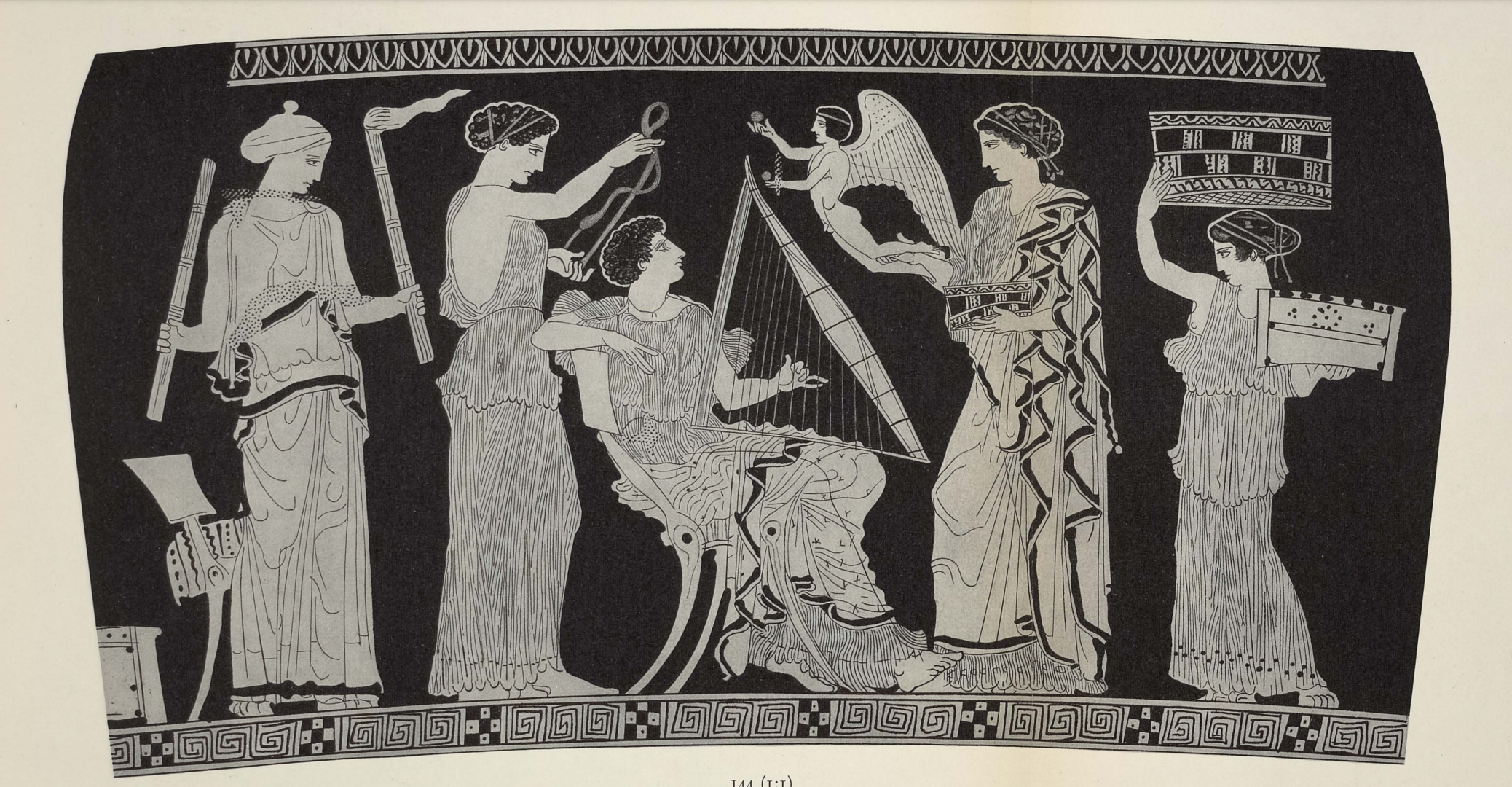
Bride plays a spindle harp, labeled "trigonon" by a researcher. Attica. Red figure, by the Bath Painter (ARV2 1126/6). New York, Metropolitan Museum, acquisition number: 16.73. Ca. 430-20

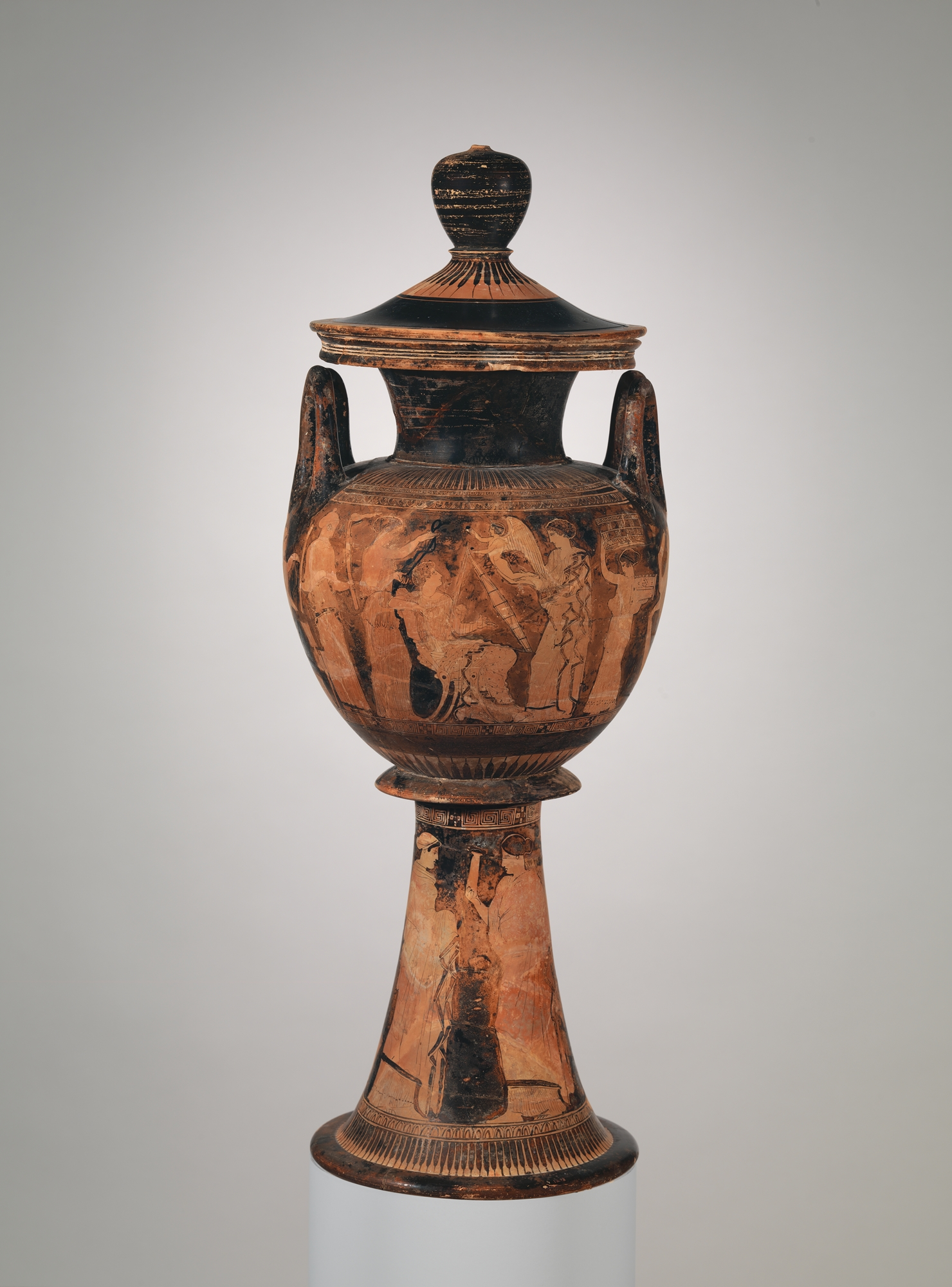

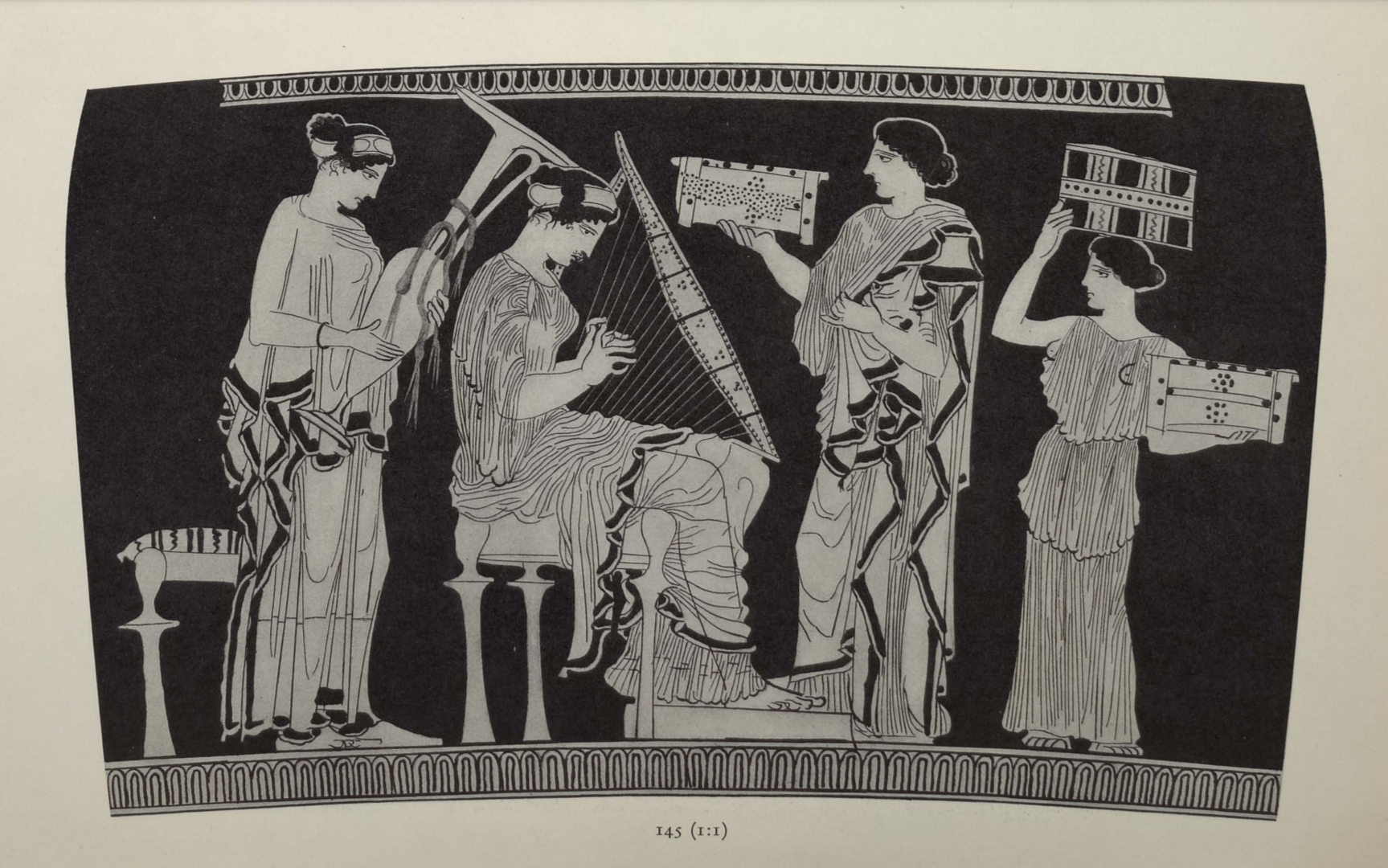
Preparations for the Wedding; bride playing a spindle harp. Attica. Red figure, by the "Bath Painter", c. 430–420

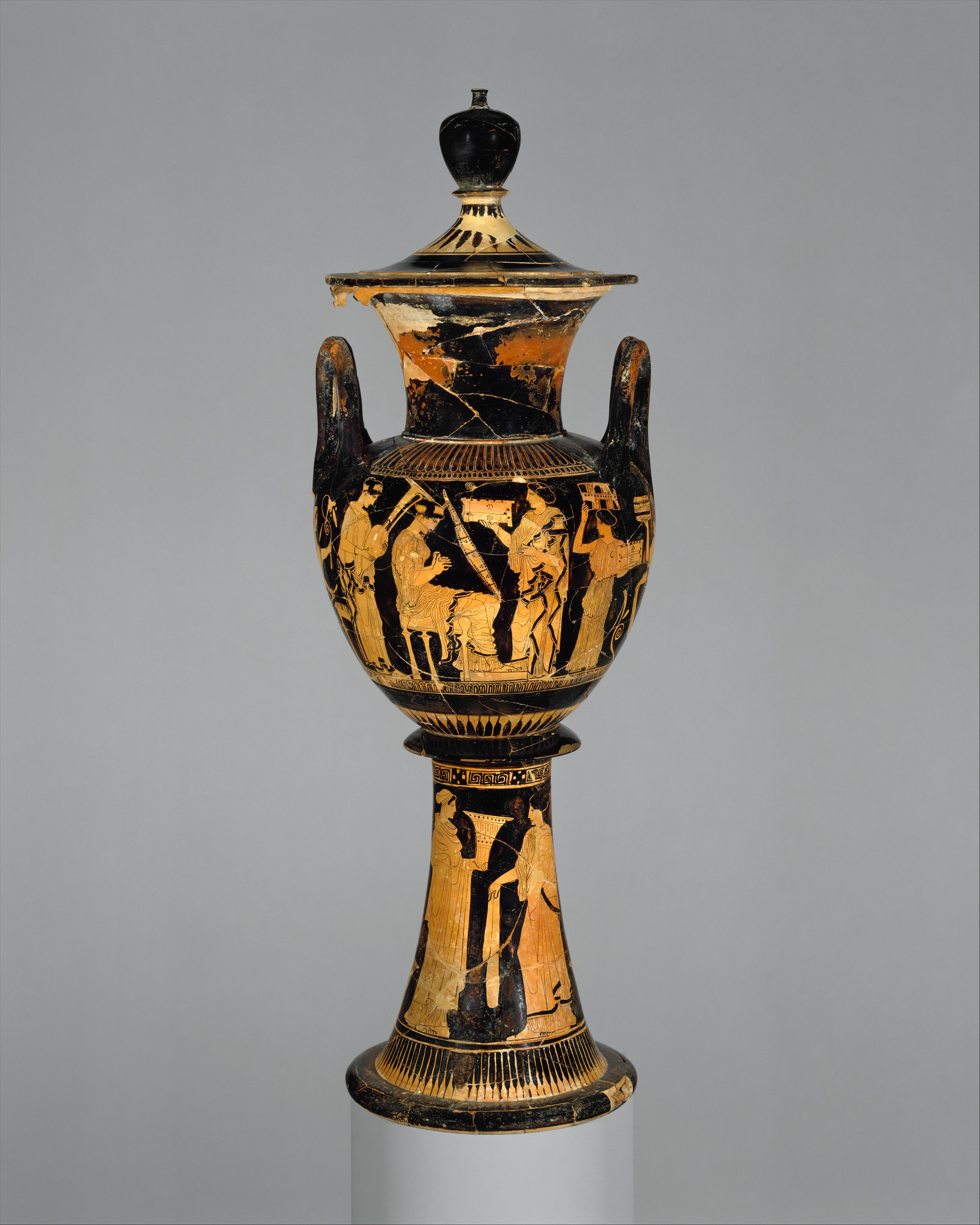

== Harps in Greek literature ==
=== Pektis, trigonus ===
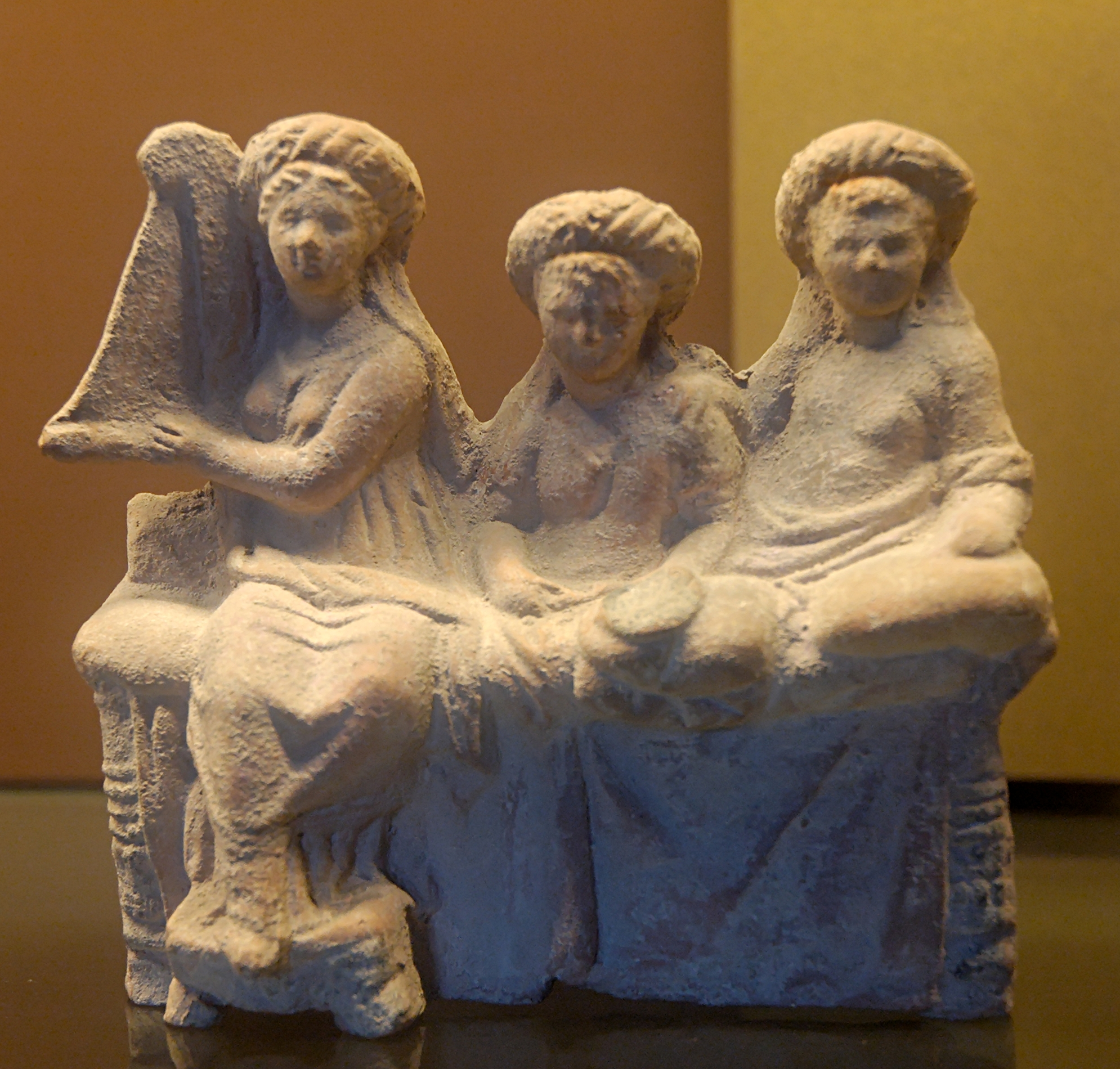
A hetaera playing an angular harp, on a klinē (couch) with two banqueters (terracotta, c. 25 BCE, from Myrina, Mysia)

In poetry, there are earlier references to the vase images: From the beginning of the 6th century BCE onwards, a musical instrument identified as a harp, called paktis or pektis (πηκτίς), appears in the works of Sappho, Alkaios, Anacreon and Pindar. Classical Greek writers described it as a hand-plucked, multi-stringed instrument of Lydian origin, characterized by playing in some kind of octave parallelism. Attic writers mention a trigon or trigonos (τρίγωνος = 'triangular'), which is considered to be different from the pektis, but similar in that it is "many-stringed;" in some places it is also called trigonon psalterion. Although there is no evidence for this, the spindle-harp with an emphatically triangular shape depicted on the vase images can perhaps be paralleled with the trigonos, and the péktis of Sappho and Alkaios can be related to the anglular harp and the frame harp; perhaps also those with a curved body shape.

=== Mágadis ===
The word Mágadis (μάγαδις) appears first in a quote by Alkman, then in a fragment of Anacreon, to cause a serious puzzle for posterity. In Anacreon's text, magadis is connected to the plucking of a twenty-stringed instrument, which is obviously a harp, but it is not at all certain that its name would be magadis. Several scholars of later antiquity identified it as the name of a musical instrument, but could not decide whether it was actually the name of a harp, kithara or aulos, and if it belonged to a harp, then whether it was the same as pektis.

Curt Sachs said that the magadis was "called ancient and of Lydian origin." He said it was mentioned in the 7th century BCE by the poet Alkman, a Lydian living in Sparta. Sachs thought it played with the fingers, a twenty-stringed instrument with its strings tuned in pairs, in octaves.

The verb magadizo (μαγαδίζω) primarily refers to a musical performance in choral singing, but perhaps also in aulos play, in which the melody is played in octave parallelism. According to this, magadis can refer to a pektis with strings made for this type of playing, possibly doubled in octaves, but it is also possible that in the fragment of Anacreón and elsewhere, the word does not refer to a separate instrument, but to this specific sound and playing technique itself. Ancient Greek music is basically vocal: the melodies, including the instruments, were mostly limited to the scope of the human voice. The melodies performed on the "many-stringed" psaltery must also have remained within these limits; the range of several octaves could be used to double the melody in octave parallels, or perhaps to echo the basic melody an octave higher or deeper.

=== Sambuke ===
The sambuke (σαμβύκη (sambýke); Latin sambuca) is often related to the trigonon and magadis in written sources, but its distinguishing features are not clearly revealed. According to some writers, it was a high-pitched harp with short strings. In the literature of the 4th century BCE and later, the term sambukistria, meaning a woman who plays the sambuke, was used for courtesans (as in general, the word psaltria, meaning a female harpist). Sambuca in Roman times was the name of a siege engine, the shape of which resembled the instrument of that name: It was a ladder or crane-like device built on the hulls of ships, with which it was possible to attack fortifications protected by moats or built on the water's edge. Even in ancient times, they could not decide whether the military equipment got its name from the musical instrument, or vice versa.

Sachs decided that the only type of instrument that corresponded to the description of the siege engine as being a boat with an upright ladder was the sambuke. "It has the narrow, boat-shaped body in a horizontal position, and an upright stringholder upon it, the lateral knobs of which give it a ladderlike appearance. Sachs also thought the instrument Mesopotamian or Iranian, corresponding to the sabka angular harp in the orchestra of Nebuchadnezzar II.

In the Middle Ages, sambuca was another name for symphonia, i.e. bagpipes and hurdy-gurdy (sambuca rotata).

=== Epigonion and simikion ===
The epigonion (ἐπιγόνειον) had an exceptionally large number of strings – as many as 40. It is said to have been named Epigonos of Sicyon, who lived in the second half of the 6th century BCE, and later it was transformed into a "vertical psalter". The simikion (σιμίκιον) is a musical instrument related to this, but only with 35 strings.

According to one hypothesis, the epigonion (and perhaps the simikion also) may have originally belonged to the board-zither family, that is, it consisted of a flat instrument body and strings stretched parallel to its plane from one side to the other. The statement that it was later used in a vertical position suggests that it was initially played horizontally, perhaps while held on the player's knees. It is conceivable that these instruments were originally not made for the purpose of musical performances, but for the study of vocal ranges and pitches.

== In the Bible ==
Among the Old Testament writings, the book of the prophet Daniel contains four passages where musical instruments were shown in the court of Nebuchadnezzar, who reigned at the beginning of the 6th century BC. (Dn 3:5, 7, 10, 15). The part is written in Aramaic, but among the names of the instruments there are some Greek foreign words, including two that mean harps in Greek writers: sabbecha and psanterín.

The sabbecha (שַׂבְּכָא or סַבְּכָא) can be related to the sambuke, but the name of the Greek instrument itself is foreign, of Middle Eastern, perhaps Phoenician origin. In the Bible commentaries of the Middle Ages, they tried to define the musical instrument in many different ways. The early Christian writer Saint Isidore of Seville, for example, classified it among wind instruments, Papias also imagined it as a "people's zither". More recently, it has been identified as a smaller vertically held harp.

The psanterin (פְּסַנְטֵרִין or פְּסַנְתֵּירִין) is a derivative of the psalterion. It is possible that it resembled a harp held horizontally and played with a beater, known from the New Assyrian Empire of the 7th century BC. The Persian santur and its variants, santir and santari, came from the same Greek word, perhaps through the mediation of the Aramaic psanterin, the name of a trapezoidal zither played with beaters, which is a relative of the cimbalom.

The Hebrew Bible in its Greek translation, the Septuagint, made around 300 BC, renders the word kinnór in some cases, and the word instrument psalterion several times, while the Latin Vulgate, made at the beginning of the 5th century AD, uses the term "psaltery".

== Use ==
In the depictions, the strings of the harp are plucked with the fingers of both hands; the use of a plectrum is exceptional. The harpist is almost always seen in a sitting position. The harpist is most often depicted as a woman, in many cases a muse. The instrument is often included in marriage ceremonies, the harpist here being the bride herself or her companion. In relatively few cases, professional female musicians can be seen on the vase images, which to some extent contradicts the written sources, the comedy writers of the classical era, who often associate the harp with adulterous and erotic female behavior.

The number of strings on the vase paintings is between nine and twenty, which is in good agreement with the data in the written sources. Triangular harps usually have many more strings than curved types. It can certainly be assumed that the sound range of such instruments was well over one octave.

Greek authors from the 4th century BC criticized the "multi-stringed" nature of certain instruments, the ability to play them in several harmonies, i.e. in different tones, and to switch from one to another. In his work Republic, Plato lists two types of psaltery, the trigonos and the péktis, among the undesirable "many-stringed" instruments. In book III (399c) of Republic, he writes: "According to this, we will not need instruments with many strings and playing in all keys in singing and melody ... We therefore do not support the makers of the trigonos, the péktis and in general instruments that play in many keys and in many keys." Aristotle, in his Politics, does not recommend certain kind of harps, like péktis, heptagonos, trigonos and sambaukes for the purpose of learning music; according to him, they are only pleasing, but not useful for virtue.

== Citations ==
=== Sources ===
- Barker, Andrew (1989). The Musician and His Art: I. Cambridge University Press. ISBN 0-521-389-119.
- Braun, Joachim; Stott, Douglas W. (2002). Music in Ancient Israel/Palestine. B. Eerdmans Publishing. ISBN 0-8028-4477-4.
- Bromiley, Geoffrey W. (1995). International Standard Bible Encyclopedia. William B. Eerdmans Publishing Company. ISBN 0-8028-3783-2.
- Bundrick, Sheramy D. (2005). Music and Image in Classical Athens. Cambridge University Press. ISBN 052-184-806-7.
- Landels, John Gray (1999). Music in Ancient Greece and Rome. Routledge. ISBN 041-516-776-0 – via Internet Archive.
- van Schaik, Marinus Jan Hendrikus (1992). The Harp in the Middle Ages: the symbolism of a musical instrument. Rodopi. ISBN 9051833679.
- Mathiesen, Thomas J. (1999). Apollo's Lyre: Greek Music and Music Theory in Antiquity and the Middle Ages. University of Nebraska Press. ISBN 080-323-079-6.
- Richter, Gisela M. A. (1936). Red Figured Athenian Vases in the Metropolitan Museum of Art. pp. 181–182.
- West, Martin Litchfield (1992). Ancient Greek Music. Oxford University Press. ISBN 019-814-975-1.
