= Museum of Ancient Greek Technology =

Coordinates: 37°38′53″N 21°18′57.2″E

Kotsanas Museum of Ancient Greek Technology
- Μουσείο Αρχαίας Ελληνικής Τεχνολογίας "Κώστας Κοτσανάς"
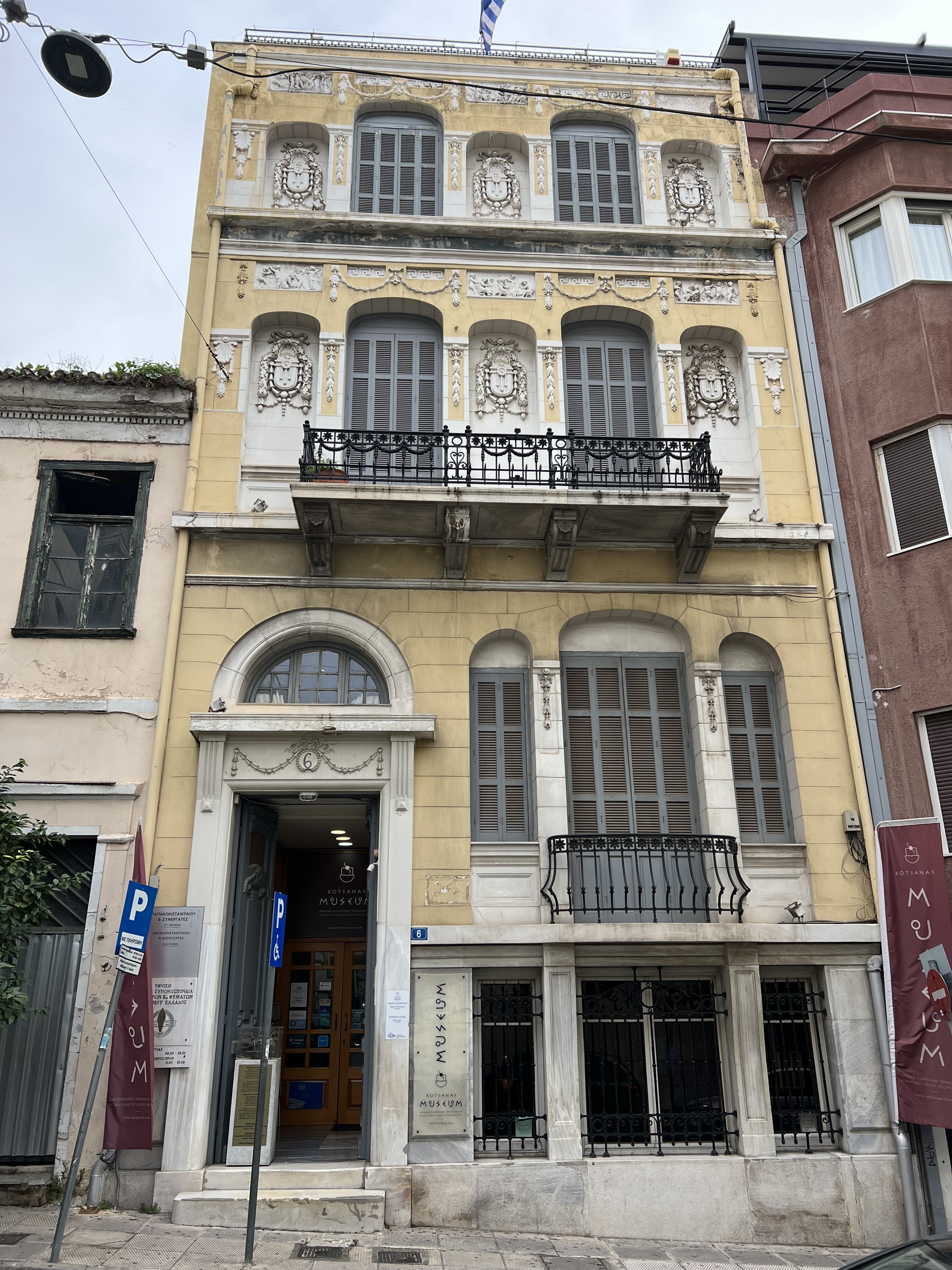
- Façade of the Kotsanas Museum of Ancient Greek Technology, Athens

- Location within Athens
- Established: 2003
- Location: Athens, Ancient Olympia, Katakolo, Heraklion
- Type: Technology museum
- Collection size: 500+
- Founder: Kostas Kotsanas
- Website: https://kotsanas.com/en/home-en/

The Museum of Ancient Greek Technology "Kostas Kotsanas" is a private museum focused on ancient Greek technology and other cultural achievements of ancient Greece. It has four permanent annexes in Athens, Ancient Olympia, Katakolo and Heraklion and it is famous for its travelling exhibitions, domestically and abroad. In 2019 it has been nominated as “European Museum of the Year” by the European Museum Forum. It is also a member of International Council of Museums (ICOM).
