= List of chordophones by Hornbostel–Sachs number =

The Hornbostel-Sachs system of musical instrument classification defines chordophones as all instruments in which sound is primarily produced by the vibration of a string or strings that are stretched between fixed points. This group includes all instruments generally called string instruments (list) in the west, as well as many (but not all) keyboard instruments, such as pianos and harpsichords.

== Chordophones (3) ==
=== Simple chordophones or zithers (31) ===
Instruments which are in essence simply a string or strings and a string bearer. These instruments may have a resonator box, but removing it should not render the instrument unplayable (although it may result in quite a different sound being produced). They include the piano therefore, as well as other kinds of zithers such as the koto, and musical bows.

==== Bar zithers (311) ====
The string bearer is bar shaped.

311.1 Musical bows - The string bearer is flexible (and curved).

311.11 Idiochord musical bows - The string is cut from the bark of the cane, remaining attached at each end.

311.111 Mono-idiochord musical bows - Containing one string only

311.112 Poly-idiochord musical bows or harp-bows - Containing several strings that pass over some type of bridge.

311.12 Heterochord musical bows - The string is of separate material from the bearer.

311.121 Mono-heterochord musical bows - The bow has one heterochord string only.

311.121.1 Without resonator.

311.121.11 Without tuning noose.

311.121.12 With tuning noose.

311.121.2 With resonator.

311.121.21 With independent resonator.

311.121.22 With resonator attached.

311.121.221 Without tuning noose.

311.121.222 With tuning noose.

311.122 Poly-heterochord musical bows - The bow has several heterochord strings.

311.122.1 Without tuning noose.

311.122.2 With tuning noose.

311.2 Stick zithers - With rigid string carrier

311.21 Musical bow/stick - The string carrier has one rigid and one flexible end.

311.211 Instrument has one resonator gourd

311.22 True stick zithers - Round sticks which happen to be hollow by chance do not belong on this account to the tube zithers, but are round-bar zithers; however, instruments in which a tubular cavity is employed as a true resonator, like the modern Mexican harpa, are tube zithers.

- Mvet (Gabon, Cameroun, Guinéea)

311.221 With one resonator gourd.

311.222 With several resonator gourds.

==== Tube zithers (312) ====
The string bearer is a vaulted surface.

312.1 Whole tube zithers - The string carrier is a complete tube

- Valiha (Madagascar)

312.11 Idiochord tube zithers.

312.12 Heterochord tube zithers.

312.121 Without extra resonator.

312.122 With extra resonator.

312.2 Half-tube zithers - The strings are stretched along the convex surface of a gutter.

- Mvet (Gabon, Cameroon, Guinea)

312.21 Idiochord half-tube zithers.

312.22 Heterochord half-tube zithers.

- Ajaeng (Korea)
- Đàn tranh (Vietnam)
- Gayageum (Korea)
- Guqin (China)
- Guzheng (China)
- Koto (Japan)

==== Raft zithers (313) ====
The string bearer is composed of canes tied together in the manner of a raft

313.1 Idiochord raft zithers.

- Adjalin (Benin)
- Kacapi (Indonesia)
- Kantele (Finlande, Karelia)

313.2 Heterochord raft zithers.

==== Board zithers (314) ====
The string bearer is a board

314.1 True board zithers.

- Cimbalom (Central and Eastern Europe)
- Harpejji (United States)
- Kacapi (Indonesia)
- Kantele (Finnish)
- Marxophone (United States)
- Moodswinger
- Pantalon (Germany)
- Psaltery (Greece)
- Qanum (Middle East)
- Santur (Iranian, India)
- Shahi Baaja (India)
- Swarmandal (India)
- Tambourine de Bearn(Basque Country)
- Tautirut (Inuit)
- Yangqin (China)

314.11 Without resonator.

314.12 With resonator.

314.121 With resonator bowl.

314.122 With resonator box - the piano is part of this subdivision.

- Autoharp (United States)
- Bandura (Ukraine)
- Bulbul tarang (Punjab)
- Dulce melos
- Dulcimer
- Épinette des Vosges (Vosges mountains)
- Gusli (Russia, Ukraine)
- Hammered dulcimer
- Piano
- Scheitholt
- Zither

314.2 Board zither variations.

314.21 Ground zithers.

314.22 Harp zithers.

==== Trough zithers (315) ====
The strings are stretched across the mouth of a trough

315.1 Without resonator.

315.2 With resonator. - Gusli

==== Frame zithers (316) ====
The strings are stretched across an open frame

316.1 Without resonator.

316.2 With resonator.

=== Composite chordophones (32) ===
Acoustic and electro-acoustic instruments which have a resonator as an integral part of the instrument, and solid-body electric chordophones. The resonators and string bearers of these instruments are physically united, and they cannot be separated without destroying the instrument. This includes most western string instruments, including lutes such as violins and guitars, and harps.

==== Lutes (321) ====
The plane of the strings runs parallel with the resonator's surface.

321.1 Bow lutes - Each string has its own flexible carrier.

321.2 Yoke lutes or lyres - The strings are attached to a yoke which lies in the same plane as the sound-table and consists of two arms and a cross-bar.

321.21 Bowl lyres.

321.22 Box lyres.

321.3 Handle lutes - The string bearer is a plain handle.

321.31 Spike lutes.

321.311 Spike bowl lutes

- Đàn tính (Vietnam)
- Kamancheh (Persian)

321.312 Spike box lutes

- Morin khuur (Mongolia)
- Sanshin (Japanese)
- Sanxian (Chinese)
- Shamisen (Japanese)

321.313 Spike tube lutes.

321.32 Necked lutes

321.321 Necked bowl lutes

- Angélique (instrument)
- Archlute
- Balalaika (Russia)
- Barbat (lute)
- Bağlama
- Biwa
- Bouzouki
- Charango
- Chitarra Italiana
- Daguangxian
- Đàn tỳ bà
- Dombra
- Domra
- Dutar
- Electric pipa
- Erhu
- Irish bouzouki
- Liuqin
- Lute
- Mandocello
- Mandola
- Mandolin
- Mandolute
- Oud
- Pandura
- Panduri
- Pipa
- Qanbus
- Rubab
- Setar
- Sitar
- Surbahar
- Tambura
- Tanpura
- Tanbur
- Tanbur (Turkish)
- Tembûr
- Theorbo
- Tiorbino
- Tiqin
- Topshur
- Tzouras
- Veena
- Zhonghu

321.322 Necked box lutes -

- Banjo
- Guitar
  - Acoustic guitar
    - Acoustic bass guitar
    - Baroque guitar
    - Classical guitar
      - Extended-range classical guitar
      - Tenor guitar
    - Flamenco guitar
    - Guitarrón mexicano
    - Harp guitar
    - Steel-string acoustic guitar
      - Archtop guitar
      - Guitar battente
      - Resonator guitar
        - Cümbüş
        - Dobro
      - Ten-string guitar
      - Twelve-string guitar
        - Bajo sexto
        - Portuguese guitar
    - Russian guitar
  - Electric guitar
    - Chambered
    - Eight-string guitar
    - Electric-acoustic guitar
    - Semi-acoustic guitar
    - Solid body
    - String-through body
  - Ukulele
- Violin family
  - Double Bass
  - Cello
  - Octobass
  - Viola
  - Violin

==== Harps (322) ====
The plane of the strings lies perpendicular to the resonator's surface.

322.1 Open harps - The harp has no pillar.

322.11 Arched harps.

322.12 Angular harps.

322.2 Frame harps - The harp has a pillar

322.21 Without tuning mechanism.

322.211 Diatonic frame harps.

322.212 Chromatic frame harps.

322.212.1 With all strings in one plane.

322.212.2 With strings in two planes crossing each other.

322.22 With tuning action.

322.221 With manual tuning action.

322.222 With pedal action.

==== Harp lutes (323) ====
The plane of the strings lies at right angles to the sound-table; a line joining the lower ends of the strings would be perpendicular to the neck. Notched bridge

- Kora
- Seperewa

=== Unclassified chordophones (33) ===
These instruments may be classified with a suffix, based on how the strings are caused to vibrate.

- 4: Hammers or beaters
- 5: Bare hands and fingers
- 6: Plectrum
- 7: Bowing
  - 71: Using a bow
  - 72: Using a wheel
  - 73: Using a ribbon
- 8: Keyboard
- 9: Using a mechanical drive
