= Hornbostel–Sachs =

Musical instrument classification system

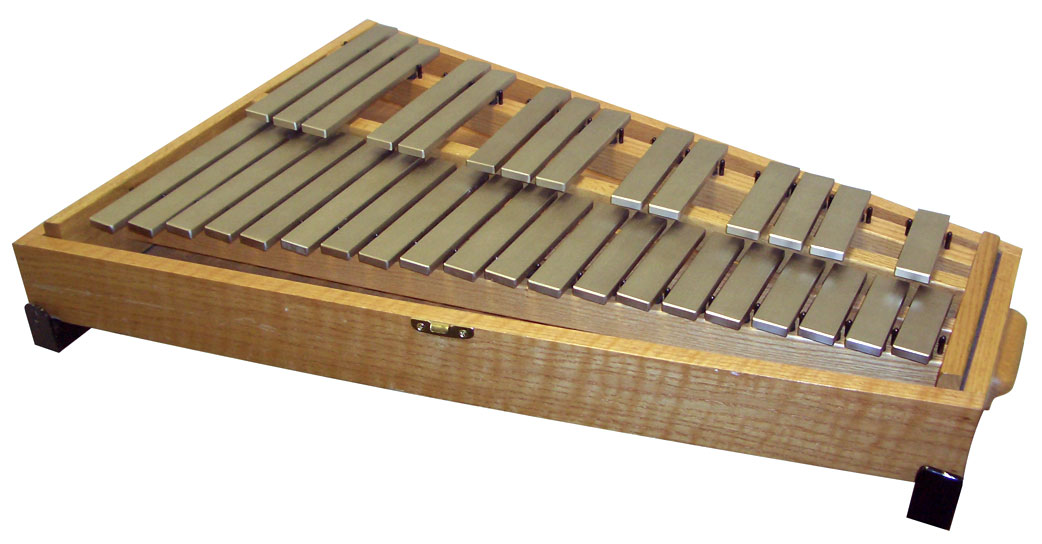
A Glockenspiel is a type of idiophone

Hornbostel–Sachs or Sachs–Hornbostel is a system of musical instrument classification devised by Erich Moritz von Hornbostel and Curt Sachs. This system was first published in the Zeitschrift für Ethnologie in 1914. An English translation was published in the Galpin Society Journal in 1961, which is the most widely used system for classifying musical instruments by ethnomusicologists and organologists (people who study musical instruments). The system was updated in 2011 as part of the work of the Musical Instrument Museums Online (MIMO) Project.

Hornbostel and Sachs based their ideas on a system devised in the late 19th century by Victor-Charles Mahillon, the curator of musical instruments at Brussels Conservatory. Mahillon divided instruments into four broad categories according to the nature of the sound-producing material: an air column; string; membrane; and body of the instrument. From this basis, Hornbostel and Sachs expanded Mahillon's system to make it possible to classify any instrument from any culture.

Formally, the Hornbostel–Sachs is modeled on the Dewey Decimal Classification for libraries. It has five top-level classifications, with several levels below those, adding up to over 300 basic categories in total.

== Idiophones (1) ==
Idiophones primarily produce their sounds by means of the actual body of the instrument vibrating, rather than a string, membrane, or column of air. In essence, this group includes all percussion instruments apart from drums, and some other instruments. In the Hornbostel–Sachs classification, idiophones are first categorized according to the method used to play the instrument. The result is four main categories: struck idiophones (11), plucked idiophones (12), friction idiophones (13) and blown idiophones (14). These groups are subsequently divided through various criteria. In many cases these sub-categories are split in singular specimens and sets of instruments. The class of idiophones includes the xylophone, the marimba, the glockenspiel, and the glass harmonica.

=== Struck idiophones (11) ===
These idiophones are set in vibration by being struck, for example cymbals or xylophones.

==== Directly struck idiophones (111) ====
The player executes the movement of striking; whether by mechanical intermediate devices, beaters, keyboards, or by pulling ropes, etc. It is definitive that the player can apply clear, exact, individual strokes, and that the instrument itself is equipped for this kind of percussion.

- 111.1 Concussion idiophones or clappers – Two or more complementary sonorous parts are struck against each other.
  - 111.11 Concussion sticks or stick clappers (clapstick).
  - 111.12 Concussion plaques or plaque clappers (paiban).
  - 111.13 Concussion troughs or trough clappers (devil chase).
  - 111.14 Concussion vessels or vessel clappers (spoons).
    - 111.141 Castanets – Natural and hollowed-out vessel clappers.
    - 111.142 Cymbals – Vessel clappers with manufactured rim.
- 111.2 Percussion idiophones – The instrument is struck either with a non-sonorous object (hand, stick, striker) or against a non-sonorous object (human body, the ground).
  - 111.21 Percussion sticks.
    - 111.211 Individual percussion sticks.
    - 111.212 Sets of percussion sticks in a range of different pitches combined into one instrument. – All xylophones, as long as their sounding components are not in two different planes.
  - 111.22 Percussion plaques.
    - 111.221 Individual percussion plaques.
    - 111.222 Sets of percussion plaques – Examples are the lithophone and also most metallophones.
  - 111.23 Percussion tubes.
    - 111.231 Individual percussion tubes.
    - 111.232 Sets of percussion tubes.
  - 111.24 Percussion vessels.
    - 111.241 Gongs – The vibration is strongest near the vertex.
      - 111.241.1 Individual gongs.
      - 111.241.2 Sets of gongs.
    - 111.242 Bells – The vibration is weakest near the vertex.
      - 111.242.1 Individual bells.
        - 111.242.11 Resting bells whose opening faces upward (for example the standing bell)
        - 111.242.12 Hanging bells suspended from the apex.
          - 111.242.121 Hanging bells without internal strikers.
          - 111.242.122 Hanging bells with internal strikers.
      - 111.242.2 Sets of bells or chimes.
        - 111.242.21 Sets of resting bells whose opening faces upward.
        - 111.242.22 Sets of hanging bells suspended from the apex.
          - 111.242.221 Sets of hanging bells without internal strikers.
          - 111.242.222 Sets of hanging bells with internal strikers.
  - 111.3 Mixed sets of directly struck idiophones

==== Indirectly struck idiophones (112) ====
The player themself does not go through the movement of striking; percussion results indirectly through some other movement by the player.

- 112.1 Shaken Idiophones or rattles – The player makes a shaking motion
  - 112.11 Suspension rattles – Perforated idiophones are mounted together, and shaken to strike against each other.
    - 112.111 Strung rattles – Rattling objects are strung in rows on a cord.
    - 112.112 Stick rattles – Rattling objects are strung on a bar or ring.
  - 112.12 Frame rattles – Rattling objects are attached to a carrier against which they strike (flexatone).
    - 112.121 Pendant rattles.
    - 112.122 Sliding rattles.
  - 112.13 Vessel rattles – Rattling objects enclosed in a vessel strike against each other or against the walls of the vessel, or usually against both.
- 112.2 Scraped Idiophones – The player causes a scraping movement directly or indirectly; a non-sonorous object moves along the notched surface of a sonorous object, to be alternately lifted off the teeth and flicked against them; or an elastic sonorous object moves along the surface of a notched non-sonorous object to cause a series of impacts. This group must not be confused with that of friction idiophones.
  - 112.21 Scraped sticks.
    - 112.211 Scraped sticks without resonator.
    - 112.212 Scraped sticks with resonator.
  - 112.22 Scraped tubes.
    - 112.221 Scraped tubes without resonator.
    - 112.222 Scraped tubes with resonator.
  - 112.23 Scraped vessels.
    - 112.231 Scraped vessels without resonator.
    - 112.232 Scraped vessels with resonator.
  - 112.24 Scraped wheels – cog rattles or Ratchet
    - 112.241 Scraped wheels without resonator.
    - 112.242 Scraped wheels with resonator.
- 112.3 Split idiophones – Instruments in the shape of two springy arms connected at one end and touching at the other: the arms are forced apart by a little stick, to jangle or vibrate on recoil.

=== Plucked idiophones (12) ===
Plucked idiophones, or lamellaphones, are idiophones set in vibration by being plucked; examples include the jaw harp or mbira. This group is sub-divided in the following two categories:

==== In the form of a frame (121) ====
The lamellae vibrate within a frame or hoop.

- 121.1 Clack idiophones or Cricri – The lamella is carved in the surface of a fruit shell, which serves as resonator.
- 121.2 Guimbardes and Jaw harps (i. e. "kissed" idiophones) – The lamella is mounted in a rod- or plaque-shaped frame and depends on the player's mouth cavity for resonance.
  - 121.21 Idioglot guimbardes – The lamella is cut through the frame of the instrument (kubing).
    - 121.211 Individual idioglot guimbardes.
    - 121.212 Sets of idioglot guimbardes
  - 121.22 Heteroglot guimbardes – The lamella is attached to the frame (Western Jew's harp, kouxian). Present-day ethnomusicologists, such as Margaret Kartomi (page 173) and Ellingson (PhD dissertation, 1979, p. 544), might support the suggestion that, in keeping with the spirit of the original Hornbostel–Sachs classification scheme, of categorization by what first produces the initial sound in the instrument, that the supposed class 412.13 should count as these instead.
    - 121.221 Individual heteroglot guimbardes.
    - 121.222 Sets of heteroglot guimbardes
  - 121.23 Mixed sets of guimbardes

==== In the form of a comb (122) ====
The lamellae are tied to a board or cut out from a board like the teeth of a comb.

- 122.1 With laced on lamellae.
  - 122.11 Without resonator.
  - 122.12 With resonator.
- 122.2 With cut-out lamellae – Musical box
  - 122.21 Without resonator.
  - 122.22 With resonator.
- 122.3 Mixed sets of combs

=== Friction idiophones (13) ===
Idiophones which are rubbed, for example the nail violin, a bowed instrument with solid pieces of metal or wood rather than strings.

==== Friction sticks (131) ====
- 131.1 Individual friction sticks.
  - 131.11 Without direct friction.
  - 131.12 With direct friction.
- 131.2 Sets of friction sticks.
  - 131.21 Without direct friction.
  - 131.22 With direct friction.
  - 131.23 Mixed

==== Friction plaques (132) ====
- 132.1 Individual friction plaques.
  - 132.11 Without direct friction.
  - 132.12 With direct friction.
- 132.2 Sets of friction plaques.
  - 132.21 Without direct friction.
  - 132.22 With direct friction.
  - 132.23 Mixed

==== Friction vessels (133) ====
- 133.1 Individual friction vessels (for example the singing bowl)
  - 133.11 Without direct friction.
  - 133.12 With direct friction.
- 133.2 Sets of friction vessels.
  - 133.21 Without direct friction.
  - 133.22 With direct friction.
  - 133.23 Mixed

Sets of Friction idiophones (134)

- 134.1 Without direct friction.
- 134.2 With direct friction.
- 134.3 Mixed

=== Blown idiophones (14) ===
Blown idiophones are those set in vibration by the movement of air, for example the Aeolsklavier, an instrument consisting of several pieces of wood which vibrate when air is blown onto them by a set of bellows. The piano chanteur features plaques.

==== Blown sticks (141) ====
- 141.1 Individual blown sticks.
- 141.2 Sets of blown sticks.
  - Aeolodion

==== Blown plaques (142) ====
- 142.1 Individual blown plaques.
- 142.2 Sets of blown plaques.

Mixed sets of blown idiophones (143)

== Membranophones (2) ==
Membranophones primarily produce their sounds by means of the vibration of a tightly stretched membrane. This group includes all drums and kazoos.

=== Struck membranophones (21) ===
Struck drums are instruments that have a struck membrane. This includes most types of drums, such as the timpani, or kettle drums, and the snare drum.

==== Directly struck membranophones (211) ====
Instruments in which the membrane is struck directly, such as through bare hands, beaters or keyboards.

- 211.1 Instruments in which the body of the drum is dish- or bowl-shaped (kettle drums)
  - 211.11 Single instruments
  - 211.12 Sets of instruments
- 211.2 Instruments in which the body is tubular (tubular drums)
  - 211.21 Instruments in which the body has the same diameter at the middle and end (cylindrical drums)
    - 211.211 Instruments which have only one usable membrane
      - 211.211.1 Instruments in which the end without a membrane is open
      - 211.211.2 Instruments in which the end without a membrane is closed
    - 211.212 Instruments which have two usable membranes
      - 211.212.1 Single instruments
      - 211.212.2 Sets of instruments
    - 211.213 Mixed sets of cylindrical drums
  - 211.22 Instruments in which the body is barrel-shaped (barrel drums)
    - 211.221 Instruments which have only one usable membrane
      - 211.221.1 Instruments in which the end without a membrane is open
      - 211.221.2 Instruments in which the end without a membrane is closed
    - 211.222 Instruments which have two usable membranes
      - 211.222.1 Single instruments
      - 211.222.2 Sets of instruments
    - 211.223 Mixed sets of barrel drums
  - 211.23 Instruments in which the body is hourglass-shaped
    - 211.231 Instruments which have only one usable membrane
      - 211.231.1 Instruments in which the end without a membrane is open
      - 211.231.2 Instruments in which the end without a membrane is closed
    - 211.232 Instruments which have two usable membranes
      - 211.232.1 Single instruments
      - 211.232.2 Sets of instruments
    - 211.233 Mixed sets of hourglass drums
  - 211.24 Instruments in which the body is conical-shaped (conical drums)
    - 211.241 Instruments which have only one usable membrane
      - 211.241.1 Instruments in which the end without a membrane is open
      - 211.241.2 Instruments in which the end without a membrane is closed
    - 211.242 Instruments which have two usable membranes
      - 211.242.1 Single instruments
      - 211.242.2 Sets of instruments
    - 211.243 Mixed sets of single-conical drums
    - 211.244 Instruments in which the body is double-conical
      - 211.244.1 Instruments which have only one usable membrane
        - 211.244.11 Instruments in which the end without a membrane is open
        - 211.244.12 Instruments in which the end without a membrane is closed
      - 211.244.2 Instruments which have two usable membranes
        - 211.244.21 Single instruments
        - 211.244.22 Sets of instruments
    - 211.245 Mixed sets of double-conical drums
    - 211.246 Mixed sets of conical drums
  - 211.25 Instruments in which the body is goblet-shaped (goblet drums)
    - 211.251 Instruments which have only one usable membrane
      - 211.251.1 Instruments in which the end without a membrane is open
      - 211.251.2 Instruments in which the end without a membrane is closed
    - 211.252 Instruments which have two usable membranes
      - 211.252.1 Single instruments
      - 211.252.2 Sets of instruments
    - 211.253 Mixed sets of goblet drums
  - 211.26 Mixed sets of tubular drums
- 211.3 Instruments in which the body depth is not greater than the radius of the membrane (frame drums).
  - 211.31 Instruments which do not have a handle
    - 211.311 Instruments which have only one usable membrane
    - 211.312 Instruments which have two usable membranes
  - 211.32 Instruments which have a handle
    - 211.321 Instruments which have only one usable membrane
    - 211.322 Instruments which have two usable membranes

==== Shaken membranophones (212) ====
Instruments that are shaken, the membrane being vibrated by objects inside the drum (rattle drums).

=== Plucked membranophones (22) ===
Instruments with a string attached to the membrane, so that when the string is plucked, the membrane vibrates (plucked drums).
Some commentators believe that instruments in this class ought instead to be regarded as chordophones (see below).

=== Friction membranophones (23) ===
Instruments in which the membrane vibrates as a result of friction. These are drums which are rubbed, rather than being struck.

==== Friction drums with stick (231) ====
Instruments in which the membrane is vibrated from a stick that is rubbed or used to rub the membrane

- 231.1 Instruments in which the stick is inserted in a hole in the membrane
  - 231.11 Instruments in which the stick can not be moved and is subject to rubbing, causing friction on the membrane
  - 231.12 Instruments in which the stick is semi-movable, and can be used to rub the membrane
  - 231.13 Instruments in which the stick is freely movable, and is used to rub the membrane
- 231.2 Instruments in which the stick is tied upright to the membrane

==== Friction drum with cord (232) ====
Instruments in which a cord, attached to the membrane, is rubbed.

- 232.1 Instruments in which the drum is held stationary while playing
  - 232.11 Instruments which have only one usable membrane
  - 232.12 Instruments which have two usable membranes
- 232.2 Instruments in which the drum is twirled by a cord, which rubs in a notch on the stick held by the player

==== Hand friction drums (233) ====
Instruments in which the membrane is rubbed by hand

=== Singing membranes (kazoos) (24) ===
This group includes kazoos, instruments which do not produce sound of their own, but modify other sounds by way of a vibrating membrane.

==== Free kazoos (241) ====
Instruments in which the membrane is vibrated by an unbroken column of wind, without a chamber

==== Tube or vessel-kazoos (242) ====
Instruments in which the membrane is placed in a box, tube or other container

== Chordophones (3) ==
Chordophones primarily produce their sounds by means of the vibration of a string or strings that are stretched between fixed points. This group includes all instruments generally called string instruments in the west, as well as many (but not all) keyboard instruments, such as pianos and harpsichords.

=== Simple chordophones or zithers (31) ===
Instruments which are in essence simply a string or strings and a string bearer. These instruments may have a resonator box, but removing it should not render the instrument unplayable, though it may result in quite a different sound being produced. They include the piano therefore, as well as other kinds of zithers such as the koto, and musical bows.

==== Bar zithers (311) ====
The string bearer is bar-shaped.

- 311.1 Musical bows – The string bearer is flexible (and curved)
  - 311.11 Idiochord musical bows – The string is cut from the bark of the cane, remaining attached at each end
    - 311.111 Mono-idiochord musical bows – Containing one string only
    - 311.112 Poly-idiochord musical bows or harp-bows – Containing several strings that pass over some type of bridge
  - 311.12 Heterochord musical bows – The string is of separate material from the bearer
    - 311.121 Mono-heterochord musical bows – The bow has one heterochord string only
      - 311.121.1 Without resonator
        - 311.121.11 Without tuning noose
        - 311.121.12 With tuning noose
      - 311.121.2 With resonator
        - 311.121.21 With independent resonator
          - 311.121.211 Without tuning noose
          - 311.121.212 With tuning noose
        - 311.121.22 With resonator attached
          - 311.121.221 Without tuning noose
          - 311.121.222 With tuning noose
    - 311.122 Poly-heterochord musical bows – The bow has several heterochord strings
      - 311.122.1 Without tuning noose
      - 311.122.2 With tuning noose
- 311.2 Stick zithers – With rigid string carrier
  - 311.21 Musical bow/stick – The string carrier has one rigid and one flexible end
    - 311.211 Instrument has one resonator gourd
    - 311.212 Instrument has several resonator gourds
  - 311.22 True stick zithers – NB Round sticks which happen to be hollow by chance do not belong on this account to the tube zithers, but are round-bar zithers; however, instruments in which a tubular cavity is employed as a true resonator, like the modern Mexican harpa, are tube zithers
    - 311.221 With one resonator gourd
    - 311.222 With several resonator gourds

==== Tube zithers (312) ====
The string bearer is a vaulted surface.

- 312.1 Whole tube zithers – The string carrier is a complete tube
  - 312.11 Idiochord tube zithers
    - 312.111 Without extra resonator
    - 312.112 With extra resonator
  - 312.12 Heterochord tube zithers
    - 312.121 Without extra resonator
    - 312.122 With extra resonator
- 312.2 Half-tube zithers – The strings are stretched along the convex surface of a gutter
  - 312.21 Idiochord half-tube zithers
    - 312.211 Without extra resonator
    - 312.212 With extra resonator
  - 312.22 Heterochord half-tube zithers
    - 312.221 Without extra resonator
    - 312.222 With extra resonator

==== Raft zithers (313) ====
The string bearer is composed of canes tied together in the manner of a raft.

- 313.1 Idiochord raft zithers
  - 313.11 Without extra resonator
  - 313.12 With extra resonator
- 313.2 Heterochord raft zithers
  - 313.21 Without extra resonator
  - 313.22 With extra resonator

==== Board zithers (314) ====
The string bearer is a board.

- 314.1 True board zithers
  - 314.11 Without resonator
  - 314.12 With resonator
    - 314.121 With resonator bowl
    - 314.122 With resonator box – the piano is part of this subdivision
    - 314.123 With resonator tube
- 314.2 Board zither variations
  - 314.21 Ground zithers
    - 314.211 Without resonator
    - 314.212 With resonator
      - 314.212.1 With resonator bowl
      - 314.212.2 With resonator box
      - 314.212.3 With resonator tube
  - 314.22 Harp zithers
    - 314.221 Without resonator
    - 314.222 With resonator
      - 314.222.1 With resonator bowl
      - 314.222.2 With resonator box
      - 314.222.3 With resonator tube

==== Trough zithers (315) ====
The strings are stretched across the mouth of a trough.

- 315.1 Without resonator
- 315.2 With resonator

==== Frame zithers (316) ====
The strings are stretched across an open frame.

- 316.1 Without resonator
- 316.2 With resonator

=== Composite chordophones (32) ===
Acoustic and electro-acoustic instruments which have a resonator as an integral part of the instrument, and solid-body electric chordophones. This includes most western string instruments, including lute-type instruments such as violins and guitars, and harps.

==== Lutes (321) ====
The plane of the strings runs parallel with the resonator's surface.

- 321.1 Bow lutes – Each string has its own flexible carrier
- 321.2 Yoke lutes or lyres – The strings are attached to a yoke which lies in the same plane as the sound-table and consists of two arms and a cross-bar
  - 321.21 Bowl lyres
  - 321.22 Box lyres
- 321.3 Handle lutes – The string bearer is a plain handle
  - 321.31 Spike lutes
    - 321.311 Spike bowl lutes
    - 321.312 Spike box lutes
    - 321.313 Spike tube lutes
    - 321.314 Spike frame lutes
  - 321.32 Necked lutes
    - 321.321 Necked bowl lute – Mandolin, Balalaika, etc.
    - 321.322 Necked box lutes – Guitar, Violin, etc.
  - 321.33 Tanged lutes or Semi-spike lutes or Half-spike lutes
    - 321.331 tanged bowl lutes
    - 321.332 tanged box lutes

==== Harps (322) ====
The plane of the strings lies perpendicular to the resonator's surface.

- 322.1 Open harps – The harp has no pillar
  - 322.11 Arched harps
  - 322.12 Angular harps
- 322.2 Frame harps – The harp has a pillar
  - 322.21 Without tuning mechanism
    - 322.211 Diatonic frame harps
      - 322.211.1 With all strings in one plane
      - 322.211.2 With strings in two planes crossing each other
    - 322.212 Chromatic frame harps
      - 322.212.1 With all strings in one plane – Inline chromatic harp
      - 322.212.2 With strings in two planes crossing each other – Cross-strung harp
  - 322.22 With tuning action.
    - 322.221 With manual tuning action – Lever harp
      - 322.221.1 With all strings in one plane
      - 322.221.2 With strings in two planes crossing each other
    - 322.222 With pedal action – Pedal harp
      - 322.222.1 With all strings in one plane
      - 322.222.2 With strings in two planes crossing each other

==== Harp lutes (323) ====
The plane of the strings lies at right angles to the sound-table; a line joining the lower ends of the strings would be perpendicular to the neck. These have notched bridges.

== Aerophones (4) ==
Aerophones primarily produce their sounds by means of vibrating air. The instrument itself does not vibrate, and there are no vibrating strings or membranes.

=== Free aerophones (41) ===
Instruments in which the vibrating air is not contained within the instrument, for example, acme sirens or the bullroarer.

==== Displacement free aerophones (411) ====
The air-stream meets a sharp edge, or a sharp edge is moved through the air. In either case, according to more recent views, a periodic displacement of air occurs to the alternate flanks of the edge. Examples are the swordblade or the whip.

==== Interruptive free aerophones (412) ====
The air-stream is interrupted periodically.

- 412.1 Idiophonic interruptive aerophones or reeds – The air-stream is directed against a lamella, setting it in periodic vibration to interrupt the stream intermittently. In this group also belong reeds with a 'cover,' i.e. a tube in which the air vibrates only in a secondary sense, not producing the sound but simply adding roundness and timbre to the sound made by the reed's vibration; generally recognizable by the absence of fingerholes though present-day ethnomusicologists, such as Margaret Kartomi (page 173) and Ellingson (PhD dissertation, 1979, p. 544), might support the suggestion that, in keeping with the spirit of the original Hornbostel–Sachs classification scheme, of categorization by what first produces the initial sound in the instrument, that such reeds should not really remain as aerophones, exiting for the lamellophones.
  - 412.11 Concussion reeds – Two lamellae make a gap which closes periodically during their vibration.
    - 412.111 Independent pairs of concussion reeds.
    - 412.112 Paired sets of concussion reeds
  - 412.12 Percussion reeds – A single lamella strikes against a frame.
    - 412.121 Independent percussion reeds.
    - 412.122 Sets of percussion reeds. – Earlier organs
  - 412.13 Free-reed instruments feature a reed which vibrates within a closely fitting slot (there may be an attached pipe, but it should only vibrate in sympathy with the reed, and not have an effect on the pitch – instruments of this class can be distinguished from 422.3 by the lack of finger-holes).
    - 412.131 Individual free reeds.
    - 412.132 Sets of free reeds – Accordion, harmonica, and reed pipes of the pipe organ.
  - 412.14 Band reed instruments – The air hits the sharp edge of a band under tension. The acoustics of this instrument have so far not been investigated.
    - 412.141 Individual band reeds.
    - 412.142 Sets of band reeds
  - 412.15 Mixed sets of reeds
- 412.2 Non-idiophonic interruptive instruments. The interruptive agent is not a reed.
  - 412.21 Rotating aerophones (interruptive agent rotates in its own plane and does not turn on its axis)- Siren disk.
    - 412.211 Independent disks.
    - 412.212 Sets of disks
  - 412.22 Whirling aerophones (interruptive agent turns on its axis) – Bullroarer, whirly tube.
    - 412.221 Independent tubes.
    - 412.222 Sets of tubes
  - 412.23 Sets of disks and tubes
- 412.3 Mixed sets of interruptive aerophones

==== Plosive aerophones (413) ====
The sound is caused by a single compression and release of air. Examples include the botija, the gharha, the ghatam, and the udu.

=== Non-free aerophones (wind instruments proper) (42) ===
The vibrating air is contained within the instrument. This group includes most of the instruments called wind instruments in the west, such as the flute or French horn, as well as many other kinds of instruments such as conch shells.

==== Edge-blown aerophones or flutes (421) ====
The player makes a ribbon-shaped flow of air with their lips (421.1), or their breath is directed through a duct against an edge (421.2).

- 421.1 Flutes without duct – The player themself creates a ribbon-shaped stream of air with their lips.
  - 421.11 End-blown flutes – The player blows against the sharp rim at the upper open end of a tube.
    - 421.111 Individual end-blown flutes.
      - 421.111.1 Open single end-blown flutes – The lower end of the flute is open.
        - 421.111.11 Without fingerholes.
        - 421.111.12 With fingerholes.
      - 421.111.2 Stopped single end-blown flutes – The lower end of the flute is closed.
        - 421.111.21 Without fingerholes.
        - 421.111.22 With fingerholes.
    - 421.112 Sets of end-blown flutes or panpipes – Several end-blown flutes of different pitch are combined to form a single instrument.
      - 421.112.1 Open panpipes.
        - 421.112.11 Open (raft) panpipes – The pipes are tied together in the form of a board, or they are made by drilling tubes *in a board.
        - 421.112.12 Open bundle (pan-) pipes – The pipes are tied together in a round bundle.
      - 421.112.2 Stopped panpipes.
        - 421.112.21 Stopped (raft) panpipes – The pipes are tied together in the form of a board, or they are made by drilling tubes *in a board.
        - 421.112.22 Stopped bundle (pan-) pipes – The pipes are tied together in a round bundle.
      - 421.112.3 Mixed open and stopped panpipes.
        - 421.112.21 Mixed (raft) panpipes – The pipes are tied together in the form of a board, or they are made by drilling tubes *in a board.
        - 421.112.22 Mixed bundle (pan-) pipes – The pipes are tied together in a round bundle.
  - 421.12 Side-blown flutes – The player blows against the sharp rim of a hole in the side of the tube.
    - 421.121 (Single) side-blown flutes.
      - 421.121.1 Open side-blown flutes.
        - 421.121.11 Without fingerholes.
        - 421.121.12 With fingerholes – Western concert flute.
      - 421.121.2 Partly stopped side-blown flutes – The lower end of the tube is a natural node of the pipe pierced by a small hole.
        - 421.121.21 Without fingerholes.
        - 421.121.22 With fingerholes
      - 421.121.3 Stopped side-blown flutes.
        - 421.121.31 Without fingerholes.
          - 421.121.311 With fixed stopped lower end – (apparently non-existent).
          - 421.121.312 With adjustable stopped lower end – piston flutes.
        - 421.121.32 With fingerholes.
          - 421.121.321 With fixed stopped lower end
          - 421.121.322 With adjustable stopped lower end
    - 421.122 Sets of side-blown flutes.
      - 421.122.1 Sets of open side-blown flutes.
      - 421.122.2 Sets of partly stopped side-blown flutes.
      - 421.122.3 Sets of stopped side-blown flutes.
        - 421.122.31 With fixed stopped lower end
        - 421.122.32 With adjustable stopped lower end
        - 421.122.33 Mixed
      - 421.122.4 Mixed sets of stopped side-blown flutes.
  - 421.13 Vessel flutes (without distinct beak) The body of the pipe is not tubular but vessel-shaped – Xun.
- 421.2 Flutes with duct or duct flutes – A narrow duct directs the air-stream against the sharp edge of a lateral orifice.
  - 421.21 Flutes with external duct – The duct is outside the wall of the flute; this group includes flutes with the duct chamfered in the wall under a ring-like sleeve and other similar arrangements.
    - 421.211 (Single) flutes with external duct.
      - 421.211.1 Open flutes with external duct.
        - 421.211.11 Without fingerholes.
        - 421.211.12 With fingerholes.
      - 421.211.2 Partly stopped flutes with external duct.
        - 421.211.21 Without fingerholes.
        - 421.211.22 With fingerholes.
      - 421.211.3 Stopped flutes with external duct.
        - 421.211.31 Without fingerholes.
        - 421.211.32 With fingerholes.
    - 421.212 Sets of flutes with external duct.
  - 421.22 Flutes with internal duct – The duct is inside the tube. This group includes flutes with the duct formed by an internal baffle (natural node, block of resin) and an exterior tied-on cover (cane, wood, hide).
    - 421.221 (Single) flutes with internal duct.
      - 421.221.1 Open flutes with internal duct.
        - 421.221.11 Without fingerholes – Whistle
        - 421.221.12 With fingerholes – Recorder
      - 421.221.2 Partly stopped flute with internal duct.
      - 421.221.3 Stopped flutes with internal duct.
        - 421.221.31 Without fingerholes.
          - 421.221.311 With fixed stopped lower end.
          - 421.221.312 With adjustable stopped lower end.
      - 421.221.4 Vessel flutes with duct.
        - 421.221.41 Without fingerholes.
        - 421.221.42 With fingerholes – Ocarina.
    - 421.222 Sets of flutes with internal duct.
      - 421.222.1 Sets of open flutes with internal duct.
        - 421.222.11 Without fingerholes – Open flue pipes of the pipe organ.
        - 421.222.12 With fingerholes – Double flageolet.
      - 421.222.2 Sets of partly stopped flutes with internal duct.
      - 421.222.3 Sets of stopped flutes with internal duct.
- 421.3 Mixed sets of flutes

==== Reed aerophones (422) ====
The player's breath is directed against a lamella or pair of lamellae which periodically interrupt the airflow and cause the air to be set in motion.

- 422.1 Double reed instruments – There are two lamellae which beat against one another.
  - 422.11 (Single) oboes.
    - 422.111 With regular bore.
      - 422.111.1 Without fingerholes.
      - 422.111.2 With fingerholes. – Oboe, bassoon.
    - (422.112 With irregular bore.)
  - 422.12 Sets of oboes.
    - 422.121 With regular bore.
      - 422.121.1 Without fingerholes.
      - 422.121.2 With fingerholes.
    - (422.122 With irregular bore.)
    - (422.123 With mixed bores.)
- 422.2 Single reed instruments – The pipe has a single 'reed' consisting of a percussion lamella.
  - 422.21 (Single) clarinets.
    - 422.211 With regular bore.
      - 422.211.1 Without fingerholes.
      - 422.211.2 With fingerholes – Western clarinet.
    - 422.212 With irregular bore – Saxophone.
  - 422.22 Sets of clarinets.
    - 422.221 With regular bore.
      - 422.221.1 Without fingerholes.
      - 422.221.2 With fingerholes.
    - (422.222 With irregular bore.)
    - (422.223 With mixed bores.)
- 422.3 Reedpipes with free reeds – The reed vibrates through [at] a closely fitted frame. There must be fingerholes, otherwise the instrument belongs to the free reeds 412.13.
  - 422.31 Single pipes with free reeds. – (Bawu).
  - 422.32 Double pipes with free reeds. – (Hulusi).
- (422.4 Reedpipes with band reeds – Though the precise acoustics of 412.14 are as yet unknown, wherefore it is as yet unknown whether the instrument must be fingerholed in order to belong to this class rather than 412.14, nevertheless it should be physically possible to put a band reed in a pipe.)
- 422.5 Mixed sets of reedpipes
- 422.6 Non-idiophonic interruptor pipes. The interruptive agent is not a reed.
  - 422.61 Rotating aerophones (interruptive agent rotates in its own plane and does not turn on its axis)- Siren diskpipes.
    - 422.611 (Single) diskpipes
      - 422.611.1 With regular bore
        - 422.611.11 Without fingerholes.
          - 422.611.111 With independent disks.
          - 422.611.112 With sets of disks
        - 422.611.12 With fingerholes
          - 422.611.121 With independent disks.
          - 422.611.122 With sets of disks
      - 422.611.2 With irregular bore
        - 422.611.21 Without fingerholes.
          - 422.611.211 With independent disks.
          - 422.611.212 With sets of disks
        - 422.611.22 With fingerholes
          - 422.611.221 With independent disks.
          - 422.611.222 With sets of disks
    - 422.612 Sets of diskpipes
      - 422.612.1 With regular bore
        - 422.612.11 Without fingerholes.
          - 422.612.111 With independent disks.
          - 422.612.112 With sets of disks
        - 422.612.12 With fingerholes
          - 422.612.121 With independent disks.
          - 422.612.122 With sets of disks
      - 422.612.2 With irregular bore
        - 422.612.21 Without fingerholes.
          - 422.612.211 With independent disks.
          - 422.612.212 With sets of disks
        - 422.612.22 With fingerholes
          - 422.612.221 With independent disks.
          - 422.612.222 With sets of disks
      - 422.612.3 With mixed bores
        - 422.612.31 Without fingerholes.
          - 422.612.311 With independent disks.
          - 422.612.312 With sets of disks
        - 422.612.32 With fingerholes
          - 422.612.321 With independent disks.
          - 422.612.322 With sets of disks
  - 422.62 Whirling aerophones (interruptive agent turns on its axis) – Bullroarerpipes, Matryoshka tubes.
    - 422.621 Bullroarerpipes
      - 422.621.1 Independent singly nested tubes.
        - 422.621.11 With same bore
          - 422.621.111 Without fingerholes.
          - 422.621.112 With fingerholes
        - 422.621.12 With opposite bores
          - 422.621.121 Without fingerholes.
          - 422.621.122 With fingerholes
      - 422.621.2 Sets of singly nested tubes
        - 422.621.21 With same bore
          - 422.621.211 Without fingerholes.
          - 422.621.212 With fingerholes
        - 422.621.22 With opposite bores
          - 422.621.221 Without fingerholes.
          - 422.621.222 With fingerholes
    - 422.622 Multiply nested (Matryoshka) tubes
      - 422.622.1 With same bores
        - 422.622.11 Without fingerholes.
        - 422.622.12 With fingerholes
      - 422.622.2 With opposite bores
        - 422.622.21 Without fingerholes.
        - 422.622.22 With fingerholes
  - 422.63 Sets of diskpipes and Matryoshka tubes
- 422.7 Mixed sets of interruptor pipes

==== Trumpets (423) ====
The player's vibrating lips set the air in motion.

- 423.1 Natural trumpets – There are no means of changing the pitch apart from the player's lips. Examples include the bugle, didgeridoo, natural horn, and the shofar.
  - 423.11 Conches – A conch shell serves as trumpet.
    - 423.111 End-blown.
      - 423.111.1 Without mouthpiece.
      - 423.111.2 With mouthpiece.
    - 423.112 Side-blown.
      - 423.112.1 Without mouthpiece.
      - 423.112.2 With mouthpiece.
    - 423.113 Sets of conches
      - 423.113.1 End-blown.
      - 423.113.2 Side-blown.
      - 423.113.3 Mixed.
  - 423.12 Tubular trumpets.
    - 423.121 End-blown trumpets – The mouth-hole faces the axis of the trumpet.
      - 423.121.1 End-blown straight trumpets – The tube is neither curved nor folded.
        - 423.121.11 Without mouthpiece.
        - 423.121.12 With mouthpiece.
      - 423.121.2 End-blown horns – The tube is curved or folded.
        - 423.121.21 Without mouthpiece.
        - 423.121.22 With mouthpiece.
      - 423.121.3 Sets of End-blown trumpets
        - 423.121.31 Straight trumpets
        - 423.121.32 End-blown horns
        - 423.121.33 Mixed
    - 423.122 Side blown trumpets.
      - 423.122.1 Without mouthpiece.
      - 423.122.2 With mouthpiece
      - 423.122.3 Sets of side blown trumpets
- 423.2 Chromatic trumpets – The pitch of the instrument can be altered mechanically
  - 423.21 Keyed trumpets – Ophicleide.
    - 423.211 Regular bore
    - (423.212 Irregular bore)
    - 423.213 Sets of keyed trumpets
      - 423.213.1 Regular bore
      - (423.213.2 Irregular bore)
      - (423.213.3 Mixed bores)
  - 423.22 Slide trumpets – Trombone, bazooka
    - 423.221 Regular bore
    - (423.222 Irregular bore)
    - 423.223 Sets of slide trumpets
      - 423.223.1 Regular bore
      - (423.223.2 Irregular bore)
      - (423.223.3 Mixed bores)
  - 423.23 Valved trumpets – French horn, euphonium, baritone horn, trumpet, tuba, and other members of the saxhorn family.
    - 423.231 Regular bore
    - (423.232 Irregular bore)
    - 423.233 Sets of slide trumpets
      - 423.233.1 Regular bore
      - (423.233.2 Irregular bore)
      - (423.233.3 Mixed bores)
  - 423.24 Mixed sets of chromatic trumpets
- 423.3 Mixed sets of trumpets

== Electrophones (5) ==
- 51. Instruments having electric action (e.g. pipe organ with electrically controlled solenoid air valves);
- 52. Instruments having electrical amplification, such as the Neo-Bechstein piano of 1931, which had 18 microphones built into it;
- 53. Radioelectric instruments: instruments in which sound is produced by electrical means.

The fifth top-level group, the electrophones category, was added by Sachs in 1940, to describe instruments involving electricity. Sachs broke down his 5th category into 3 subcategories: 51=electrically actuated acoustic instruments; 52=electrically amplified acoustic instruments; 53= instruments which make sound primarily by way of electrically driven oscillators, such as theremins or synthesizers, which he called radioelectric instruments. Francis William Galpin provided such a group in his own classification system, which is closer to Mahillon than Sachs–Hornbostel. For example, in Galpin's 1937 book A Textbook of European Musical Instruments, he lists electrophones with three second-level divisions for sound generation ("by oscillation", "electro-magnetic", and "electro-static"), as well as third-level and fourth-level categories based on the control method. Sachs himself proposed subcategories 51, 52, and 53, on pages 447–467 of his 1940 book The History of Musical Instruments.

Present-day ethnomusicologists, such as Margaret Kartomi and Ellingson (PhD dissertation, 1979, p. 544), suggest that, in keeping with the spirit of the original Hornbostel–Sachs classification scheme, of categorization by what first produces the initial sound in the instrument, that only subcategory 53 should remain in the electrophones category. Thus it has been more recently proposed that, for example, the pipe organ (even if it uses electric key action to control solenoid valves) remain in the aerophones category, and that the electric guitar remain in the chordophones category, etc.

== Application of the system ==
Beyond the top three groups are several further levels of classification, so that the xylophone, for example, is in the group labeled 111.212 (periods are usually added after every third digit to make long numbers easier to read). A long classification number does not necessarily indicate the instrument is a complicated one. The valveless bugle, for instance, has the classification number 423.121.22, even though it is generally regarded as a relatively simple instrument. The numbers in the bugle's classification indicate the following:

- 4 – an aerophone
- 42 – the vibrating air is enclosed within the instrument
- 423 – the player's lips cause the air to vibrate directly (as opposed to an instrument with a reed like a clarinet, or an edge-blown instrument, like a flute)
- 423.1 – the player's lips are the only means of changing the instrument's pitch (that is, there are no valves as on a trumpet)
- 423.12 – the instrument is tubular, rather than being a conch-type instrument
- 423.121 – the player blows into the end of the tube, as opposed to the side of the tube
- 423.121.2 – the tube is bent or folded, as opposed to straight
- 423.121.22 – the instrument has a mouthpiece

423.121.22 does not uniquely identify the bugle, but rather identifies the bugle as a certain kind of instrument which has much in common with other instruments in the same class. Another instrument classified as 423.121.22 is the bronze lur, an instrument dating back to the Bronze Age.

== Suffixes and composite instruments ==
After the number described above, a number of suffixes may be appended. An 8 indicates that the instrument has a keyboard attached, while a 9 indicates the instrument is mechanically driven. In addition to these, there are a number of suffixes unique to each of the top-level groups indicating details not considered crucial to the fundamental nature of the instrument. In the membranophone class, for instance, suffixes can indicate whether the skin of a drum is glued, nailed or tied to its body; in the chordophone class, suffixes can indicate whether the strings are plucked with fingers or plectrum, or played with a bow.

There are ways to classify instruments with this system even if they have elements from more than one group. Such instruments may have particularly long classification numbers with colons and hyphens used as well as numbers. Hornbostel and Sachs themselves cite the case of various bagpipes where some of the pipes are single reed (like a clarinet) and others are double reed (like the oboe). A number of similar composite instruments exist.

== See also ==
- List of musical instruments by Hornbostel–Sachs number
