= List of musical instruments by Hornbostel–Sachs number: 311.121.222 =

This is a list of instruments by Hornbostel-Sachs number, covering those instruments that are classified under 311.121.222 under that system. These instruments are single-stringed heterochord musical bows with an attached resonator and a tuning noose.

3: Instruments in which sound is produced by one or more vibrating strings (chordophones, string instruments).

31: Instruments which consist solely of a string bearer or a string bearer with a resonator that is not integral to the instrument

311: Instruments with a string bearer shaped like a bar, or consisting of a sideways board (bar zithers)

311.1: Instruments with a flexible or curved string bearer

311.12: Instruments with string made from a different material than the string bearer

311.121: Instruments with only one heterochord string

311.121.2: Instrument has a resonator

311.121.22: Instrument has a resonator that is attached

311.121.222: Instrument does have a tuning noose

These instruments may be classified with a suffix, based on how the strings are caused to vibrate.

- 4: Hammers or beaters
- 5: Bare hands and fingers
- 6: Plectrum
- 7: Bowing
  - 71: Using a bow
  - 72: Using a wheel
  - 73: Using a ribbon
- 8: Keyboard
- 9: Using a mechanical drive

Instrument	Tradition	Hornbostel–Sachs classification	Description
goura	Khoikhoi	311.121.222	Single stringed instrument, blown rather than plucked or strummed, with the string attached to a coconut shell resonator and with a tension noose wrapped around the string to adjust the pitch
lesiba	Basotho	311.121.222	Stringed instrument, blown rather than plucked or strummed, with a single string and tuning noose attached both to a bow and a feather quill, with a frame made from a coconut shell
