= List of musical instruments by Hornbostel–Sachs number: 311.222 =

This is a list of instruments by Hornbostel-Sachs number, covering those instruments that are classified under 311.222 under that system. It includes instruments with a resonator that is not physically integral to the instrument, with more than one string stretched between the ends of a curved and inflexible stick. Anthropologist Thomas Alvad has concluded that instruments of this type are an intermediate stage in the development of the simple musical bow into an arched harp.

3: Instruments in which sound is produced by one or more vibrating strings (chordophones, string instruments).

31: Instruments which consist solely of a string bearer or a string bearer with a resonator that is not integral to the instrument

311: Instruments with a string bearer shaped like a bar, or consisting of a sideways board (bar zithers)

311.2: Instrument has a rigid and inflexible string carrier (stick zither)

311.22: Instrument has no curved or flexible end (true stick zither)

311.222: Instrument has more than one resonator gourds

These instruments may be classified with a suffix, based on how the strings are caused to vibrate.

- 4: Hammers or beaters
- 5: Bare hands and fingers
- 6: Plectrum
- 7: Bowing
  - 71: Using a bow
  - 72: Using a wheel
  - 73: Using a ribbon
- 8: Keyboard
- 9: Using a mechanical drive

== List ==
Instrument	Tradition	Hornbostel–Sachs classification	Description
waj	Nuristan, Afghanistan	{{{Number}}}	Curved stick with strings stretched from end to end and a boat-shaped resonator
