= List of musical instruments by Hornbostel–Sachs number: 312.22 =

This is a list of instruments by Hornbostel-Sachs number, covering those instruments that are classified under 312.22 under that system. These instruments are single-stringed heterochord musical bows with an attached resonator and a tuning noose.

3: Instruments in which sound is produced by one or more vibrating strings (chordophones, string instruments).

31: Instruments which consist solely of a string bearer or a string bearer with a resonator that is not integral to the instrument

312: Instrument has a string bearer made of a vaulted surface (tube zithers)

312.2: Instrument has strings that are stretched across a convex gutter (half-tube zithers)

312.22: Instrument is a heterochord

These instruments may be classified with a suffix, based on how the strings are caused to vibrate.

- 4: Hammers or beaters
- 5: Bare hands and fingers
- 6: Plectrum
- 7: Bowing
  - 71: Using a bow
  - 72: Using a wheel
  - 73: Using a ribbon
- 8: Keyboard
- 9: Using a mechanical drive

Instrument	Tradition	Hornbostel–Sachs classification	Description
ajaeng 아쟁, 牙箏	Korea	312.22	Half-tube zither with seven silk strings, played with a piece of forsythia wood
Đàn tranh 檀箏	Vietnam	312.22	Wooden-bodied and steel-stringed zither
gayageum kayagum, kayago, kayagŭm, 가야금, 伽倻琴	Korea	312.22-5	zither-like string instrument, with 12 strings.
geomungo komungo, kŏmun'go, hyeongeum, hyongum, hyŏn'gŭm	Korea	312.22	Fretted zither
guqin	China	312.22	
guzheng zheng, gu-zheng	China	312.22-5	Half-tube zither, rectangular with three sound holes on the bottom, now with twenty-one strings most typically, pentatonic tuning, strings are plucked by hand
koto	Japan	312.22-6	Long and hollow thirteen-stringed instrument
koto, 17-string	Japan	312.22	17-stringed koto
se	China	312.22	Ancient plucked instrument
yazheng ya zheng, ya cheng	China	312.22	
yatga ятга, ᠶᠠᠲᠤᠭ᠎ᠠ	Mongolia	312.22-5	Zither with 21 or 13 strings, plucked by hand
