= List of musical instruments by Hornbostel–Sachs number: 311.211 =

This is a list of instruments by Hornbostel-Sachs number, covering those instruments that are classified under 311.211 under that system. It includes instruments that are Stick zithers, musical bow cum stick, with rigid string carrier, curved flexible end, one attached resonator gourd.

3: Instruments in which sound is produced by one or more vibrating strings (chordophones, string instruments).

31: Instruments which consist solely of a string bearer or a string bearer with a resonator that is not integral to the instrument

311: Instruments with a string bearer shaped like a bar, or consisting of a sideways board (bar zithers)

311.2: Instrument has a rigid and inflexible string carrier (stick zither)

311.21: Instrument has a string carrier with one curved, flexible end (musical bow)

311.211: Instrument has one resonator gourd

These instruments may be classified with a suffix, based on how the strings are caused to vibrate.

- 4: Hammers or beaters
- 5: Bare hands and fingers
- 6: Plectrum
- 7: Bowing
  - 71: Using a bow
  - 72: Using a wheel
  - 73: Using a ribbon
- 8: Keyboard
- 9: Using a mechanical drive

== List ==
Instrument	Tradition	Hornbostel–Sachs classification	Description
Kse diev Khsae muoy	Cambodia	311.211	Stick zithers, musical bow cum stick, with rigid string carrier, curved flexible end, one attached resonator gourd
Phin namtao	Lanna (Northern Thailand)	311.211	Chest-resonated stick zither with one string, equivalent to Kse diev
Phin pia Pin pia	Lanna (Northern Thailand)	311.211	Chest-resonated stick zither with two to five strings
