= Mvet =

Stringed musical instrument of the Fang people of Central Africa

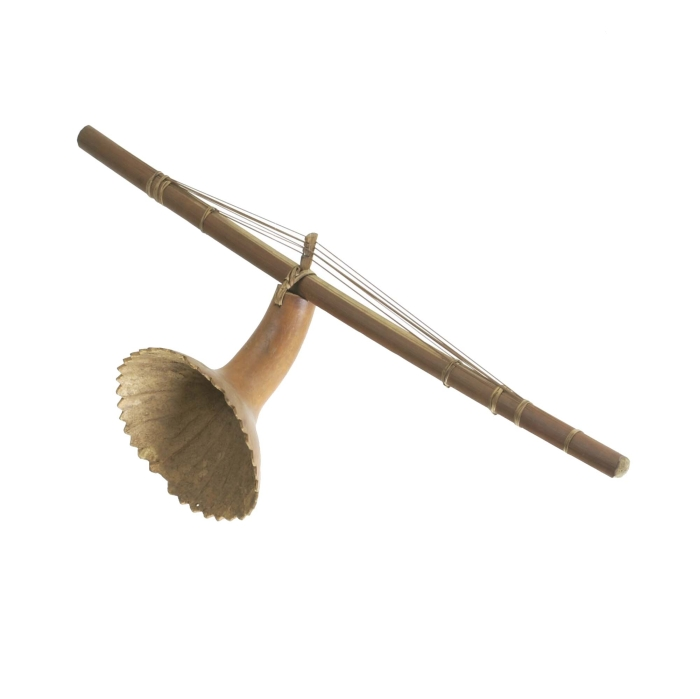
A short mvet with four strings and a single central resonator

The mvet or mvett is a stringed musical instrument, a type of stick zither, Hornbostel-Sachs (311) of the Fang people of Gabon, Cameroon, Democratic Republic of the Congo, São Tomé and Equatorial Guinea.

Somewhat resembling the Mande kora, but larger and simpler, it consists of a tubular stick of palm-raffia or bamboo, between one and two metres long, with usually three calabash resonators. A central vertical bridge divides four or five gut or metal strings, played both sides of the bridge.

== Origin ==
The instrument is held horizontally on the chest to close or open the central resonator with a movement of the arms. It may be played solo or may accompany song or poetry that includes epics, battle-songs, ritual, philosophy and knowledge of the world.

Mvet also refers to the tradition of epic song singers, which is extremely rich in its thematic and stylistic diversity, in which the mythological stories and historical events of the Fang and related ethnic groups are described. For the Fang, the mvet tradition is of outstanding importance and includes multiple forms of cultural expression.

In the late twentieth century the mvet became a key instrument of bikutsi music.

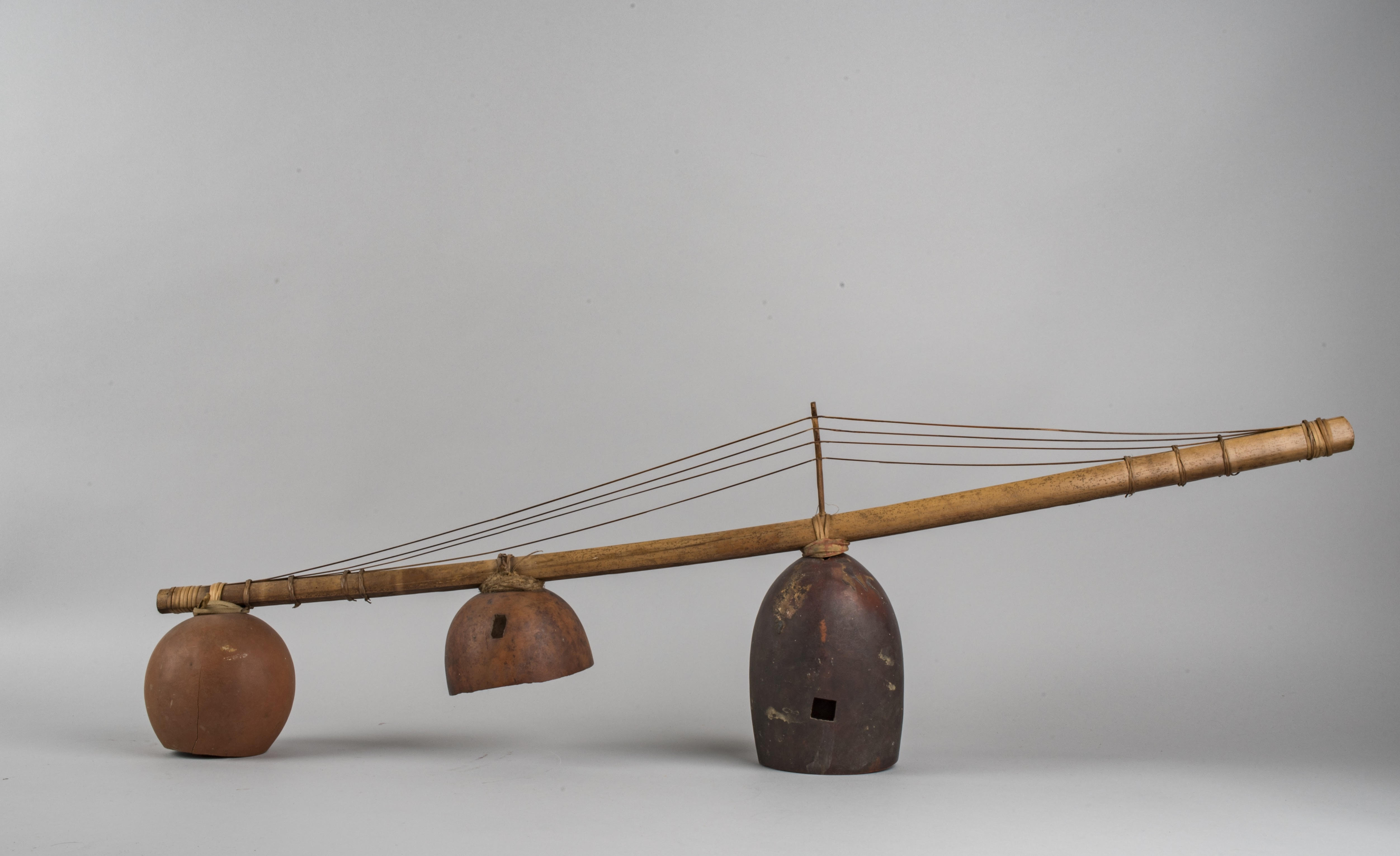
Mvet with multiple gourd resonators

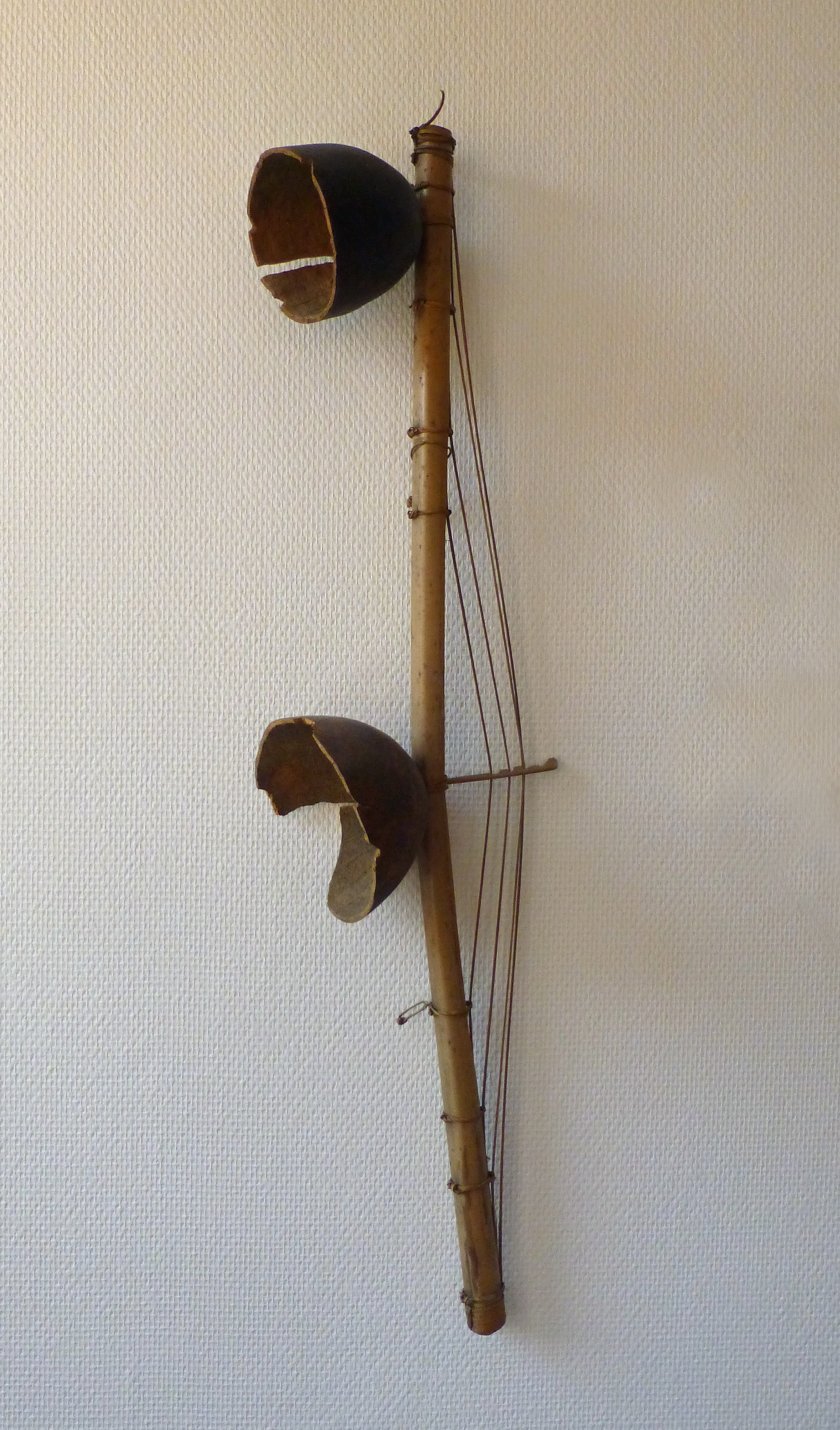

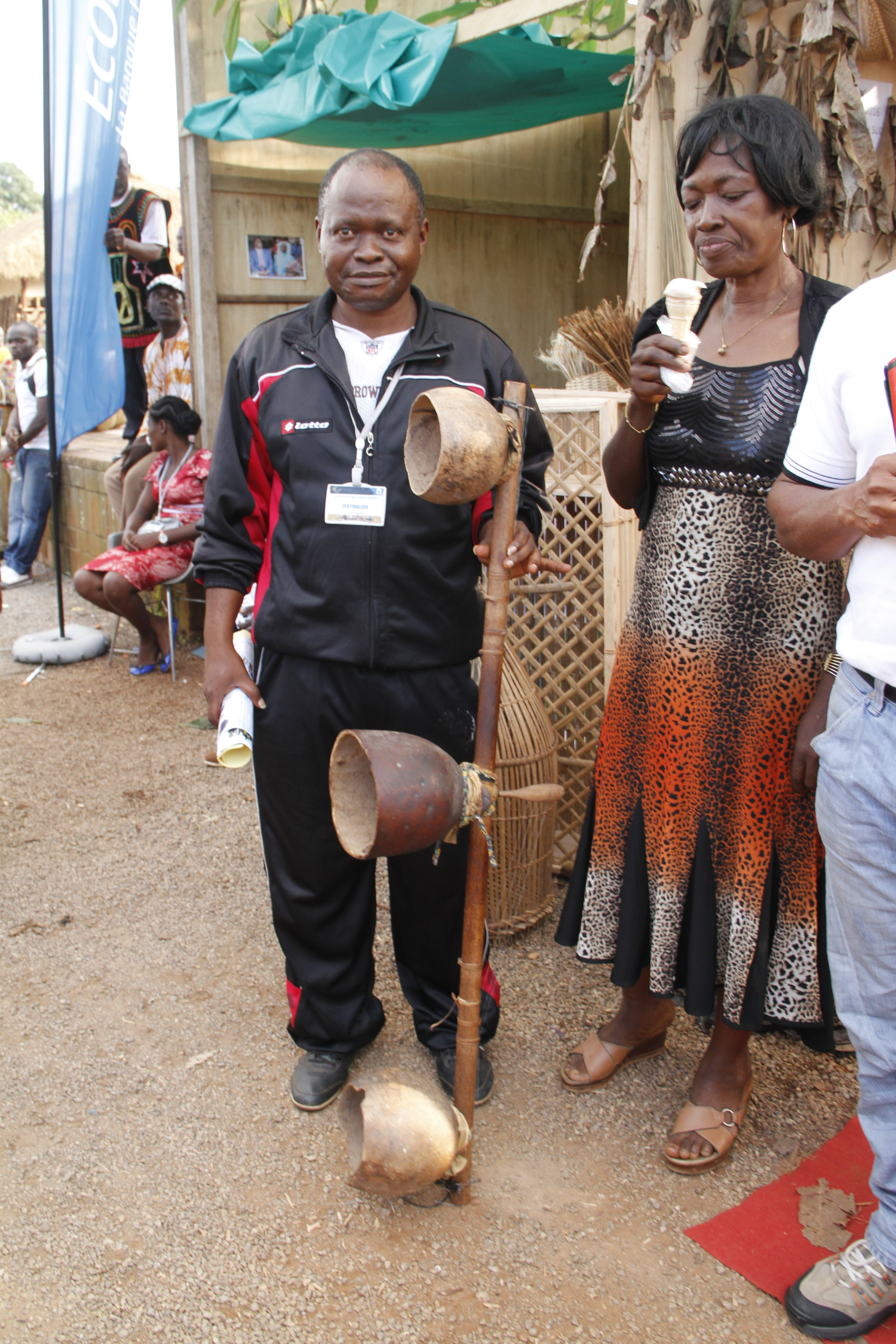

== Legend ==
According to legend, the creation of Mvett is due to a powerful warrior named Oyono Ada Ngone, whose mythology is linked to the migration of the Fang-Béti-Bulu. They were often the target of murderous attacks from the tribes they encountered on their way.

Some of these attackers were identified as belonging to the Mvéle people and the Bassa people, by historians such as Joseph Ki-Zerbo, Pierre Alexandre or Tsira Ndong Ndoutoume.

Tsira Ndong Ndoutoume, in his book Le Mvett : épopée fang, wrote:

"During their escape, one of them, Oyono Ada Ngone, a great musician and warrior, suddenly fainted. His lifeless body was carried for a week. After his coma, Oyono came back to life and announced to the fugitives that he had just discovered a sure way to give himself courage."

Oyono gathered his people and told them that they would take revenge by leading military expeditions against the populations they encountered on their way. He specifies that during his coma he was in contact with a higher entity, named Eyo, who incarnates in the Mvett. Eyo is seen as a “Spirit” who gave him a musical instrument: a chordophone called Mvett. Eyo also transmitted to him the song and the stories of the great deeds of the Ekang which would revive hope among the population.

Upon waking, Oyono Ada Ngone recounted what he had seen and heard. Then he set about making the musical instrument.

== See also ==
- Bwiti
- List of musical instruments of Cameroon
- Kinnari vina, an Indian tube zither that shares features with the Mvet, including its vertical bridge
