= Devil chaser =

Percussion Instrument

Devil Chaser
Percussion
- Other names: balingbing, bunkaka, devil chaser
- Classification: Struck idiophone
- Hornbostel–Sachs classification: 111.13 (Bamboo trough clapper)

The devil chaser is a percussion instrument originating in Southern Asia and commonly found in India and the Philippines. It is an idiophone made from a bamboo stalk split for about half of its length, and the resulting fork vibrates when struck against the hand. Rich humming noises are produced from the natural cracks in the bamboo, and a musician can place their thumb over the tuning hole at one end of the instrument to control the air to flow in and out while striking it, adding a characteristic buzzing sound. The sound ranges from a hum to a roar, depending on size and playing technique. This noise was used by early villagers to ward off the devil and evil spirits, thus giving it its name.
