= List of musical instruments by Hornbostel–Sachs number: 31 =

This is a list of instruments by Hornbostel-Sachs number, covering those instruments that are classified under 31 under that system. This category includes all instruments consisting of a simple string bearer and strings. An additional resonator may be present, but it is not integral, so removing it should not destroy the instrument - the resonator must not be supporting the strings.

3: Instruments in which sound is produced by one or more vibrating strings (chordophones, string instruments).

31: Instruments which consist solely of a string bearer or a string bearer with a resonator that is not integral to the instrument

311: Instruments with a string bearer shaped like a bar, or consisting of a sideways board (bar zithers)

311.1: Instruments with a flexible or curved string bearer

311.12: Instruments with string made from a different material than the string bearer

311.121: Instruments with only one heterochord string

311.121.2: Instrument has a resonator

311.121.22: Instrument has a resonator that is attached

311.121.221: Instrument does not have a tuning noose
311.121.222: Instrument does have a tuning noose

311.2: Instrument has a rigid and inflexible string carrier (stick zither)

311.21: Instrument has a string carrier with one curved, flexible end (musical bow)

311.211: Instrument has one resonator gourd

311.22: Instrument has no curved or flexible end (true stick zither)

311.221: Instrument has one resonator gourd

312: Instrument has a string bearer made of a vaulted surface (tube zithers)
313: Instrument has a string bearer made from canes tied together like a raft (raft zithers)
314: Instrument uses a string bearer that is shaped like a board, or is the ground (board zithers)
315: Instrument with strings stretched across the mouth of a trough (trough zithers)
316: Instrument uses strings stretched across an open frame (frame zither)

This category includes musical bows, zithers and some keyboard instruments like the piano and harpsichord.

These instruments may be classified with a suffix, based on how the strings are caused to vibrate.

- 4: Hammers or beaters
- 5: Bare hands and fingers
- 6: Plectrum
- 7: Bowing
  - 71: Using a bow
  - 72: Using a wheel
  - 73: Using a ribbon
- 8: Keyboard
- 9: Using a mechanical drive

== List ==
- Clavichord
- Harpsichord
- Musical bow
  - Carimba
- Piano
- Zither
  - Gayageum
  - Overtone zither
- Aeolian harp
- Koto
- Cymbalom
- Hammered dulcimer
