= Adjalin =

Zither native to Benin

The adjalin is a type of zither native to Benin. It consists of a rectangular form constructed of bamboo branches, tied together with raffia.

It is used in the traditional music of Benin, particularly in public festivals and rituals.
