= Frame zither =

Class of musical instruments

Jacqke/Frame zither
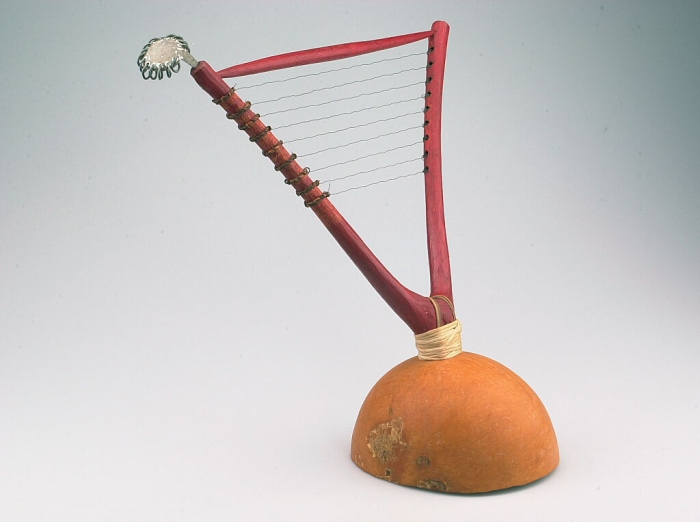
- Liberian zither with calabash resonator. Called a "harp" by its collector; however, on a harp the "plane of the strings lies perpendicular to the resonator's surface." The strings running parallel to the gourd resonator make this a frame zither under Hornbostel-Sachs.

String instrument
- Other names: belly harp
- Classification: String instrument Chordophone Plucked string instrument
- Hornbostel–Sachs classification: 316: 316.1 Without resonator.; 316.2 With resonator. (Instruments which are in essence simply a string or strings and a string bearer. The strings are stretched across an open frame)
- Inventor: folk instrument

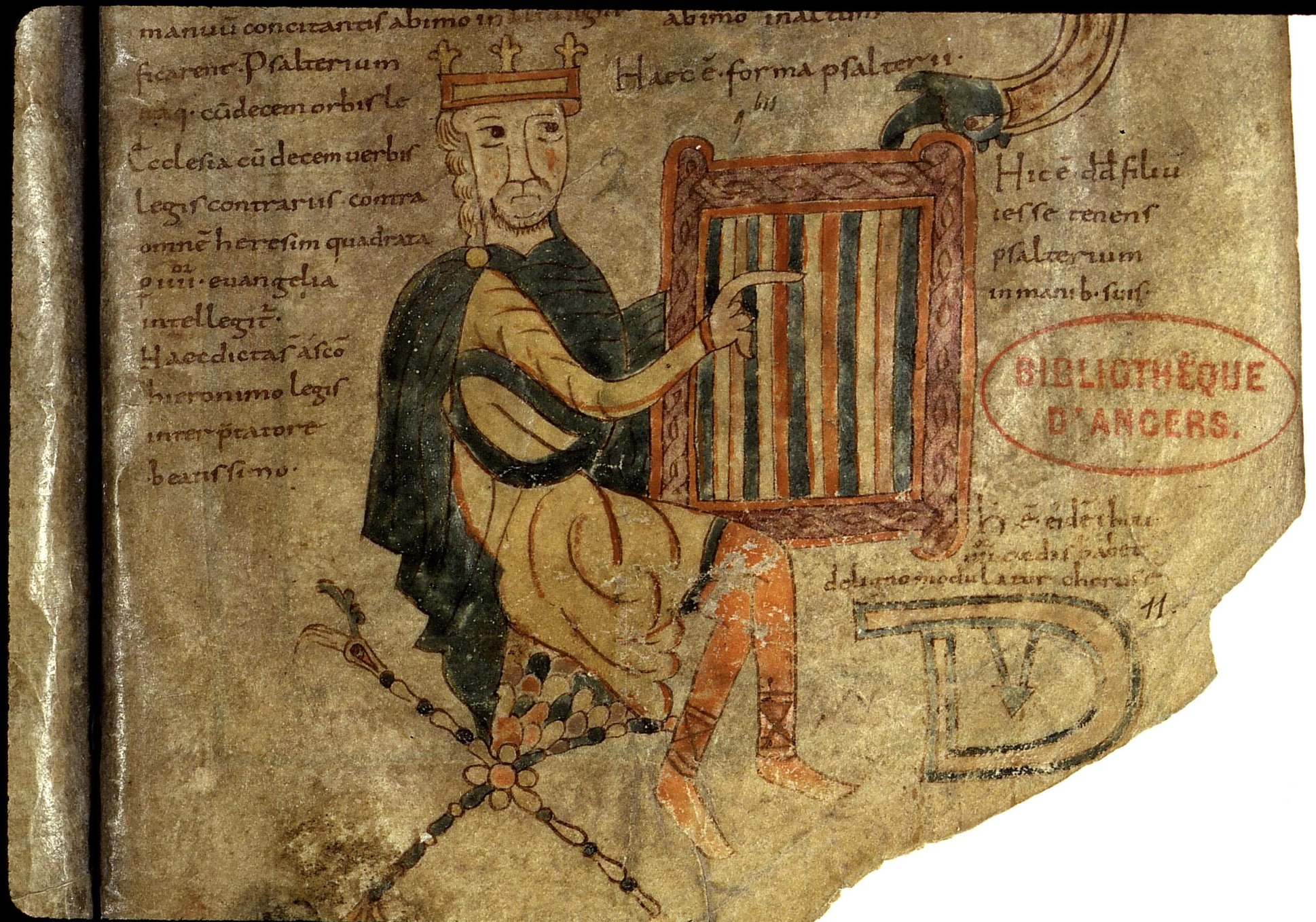
Stylized drawing in a medieval manuscript shows a man playing an instrument with strings stretched across a frame. Text reveals it is a psaltery, which means it would have a board behind the strings and not be a frame zither.

Frame zither is a class of musical instrument (subset of zither) within the Hornbostel-Sachs classification system for a type of simple chordophone (stringed instrument), in which the body of the instrument is made from a frame.

Frame zithers are musical instruments in which strings are strung across an open frame. They could be similar to harps and psalteries which can also have strings stretched across frames. However, in harps the strings run from the frame to a resonating table embedded into the frame on the frame's other end. Psalteries may also have a frame, but behind the strings (parallel to them) is a board, the top of a box which acts as a resonator.

Musicians may add a resonator as is done with a bow harp; they can attach or put the instrument into a calabash gourd or a ceramic pot.

Under the Hornbostel-Sachs system of musical instrument classification, any frame with strings stretched across, and without a built in resonator, would count as a frame zither. In musical instrument encyclopedias, however, there are few or no examples of frame zithers except those found in Africa. Potential examples include medieval European illustrations; these however are not clear and could equally illustrate forms of harps or psalteries.

== Africa ==
=== Triangular ===
African frame zithers are made with frames of three "arms" forming a triangle, or a round frame made of wood. Two of the arms are inserted into a calabash gourd base, with the base of the gourd cut away. The gourd acts as a resonator. The instrument is played by holding the opening in the resonator against the player's chest or stomach, with the instrument being within reach of their arms.

The main known example are instruments of the Kru people of Liberia. They may also be seen in Sierra Leone and Guinea.

=== Round ===
Another form of African frame zither uses a round frame or hoop, with the strings stretched across it. Women of the Nuba people of Sudan make round frame-zithers, by bending a stick into a hoop, spanned 3 or four times by a single string (forming individual lengths to play). The instrument is placed on top of a gourd for resonance.

=== Recordings ===
- Belly Harp. Folk Music of Liberia, Folkways FE 4465 (Side ll, band 3)
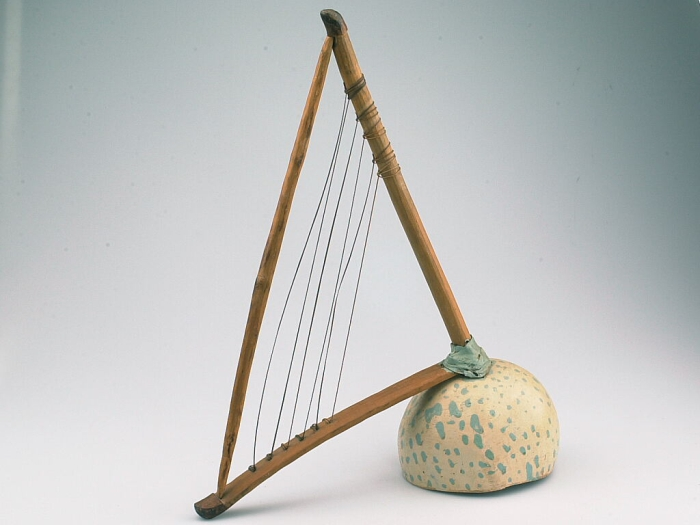
A loma belly harp, played by the Crau, Crau, Krao, Krawi, Kru, Nana peoples of West Africa.

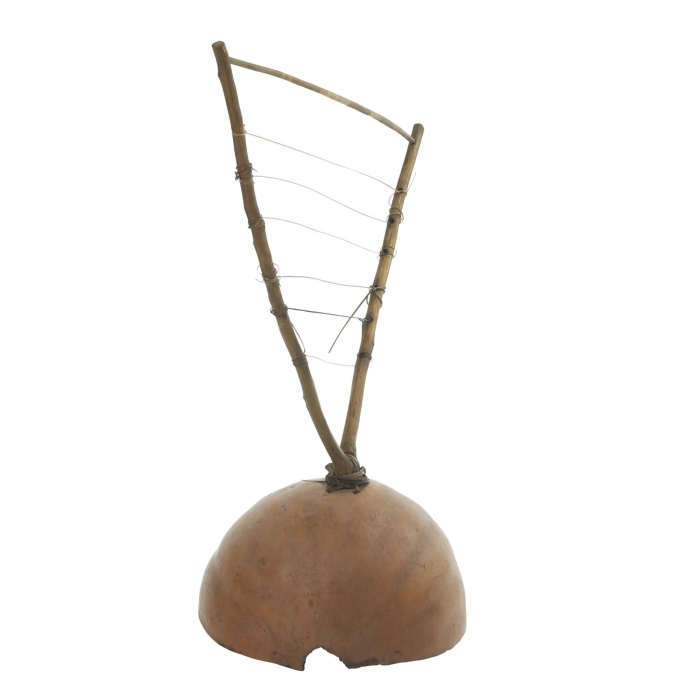
