= Siren disk =

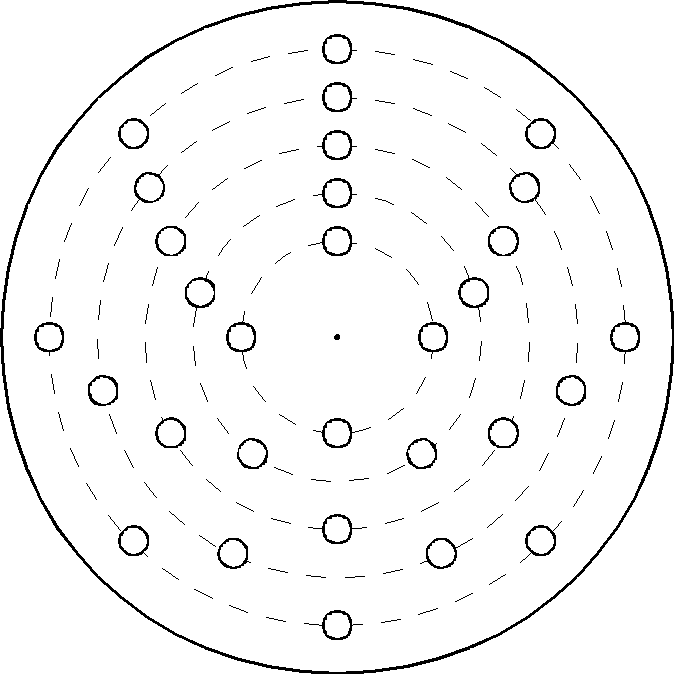
Hypothetical siren disk with five concentric circles, each with a different number (4, 5, 6, 7 & 8) of equally spaced holes.

A siren disk is used in pneumatic sirens and has holes which are variously spaced apart. When the disk is spun in front of a jet of air, the holes modulate the air-jet which produces a sound. The pitch of a siren is produced by "the frequency of the impulses of compressed air passing through the openings in a rotating disk." The pitch is therefore determined by the speed at which the disk rotates, the number of holes which air passes through, the size of the holes and their spacing apart.

== Typical usages of siren disks ==
Siren disks were once used as the active element of sirens, but the majority of siren disks currently manufactured are used as instructional aids in teaching the mechanics of sound and music. For example, the Ontario Science Centre has a metal siren disk set up as an interactive teaching exhibit for children.

== Siren disk hole spacing ==
=== The harmonic portion of the siren disk ===
Most siren disks include multiple concentric circles of spaced holes, so that an air-jet can be directed at different radii to get different effects. For example, the outermost eight circles of holes include uniformly spaced holes, in which the number of holes increases along a harmonic series, so that the eight notes of a musical scale can be played by directing an air jet sequentially at each circle.

=== The non-harmonic portion of the siren disk ===
Typically there are further holes nearer the disk's centre with various non-uniform patterns, such as random spacing or arpeggios, etc.

== Typical numbers of holes in siren disks ==
Unlike the hypothetical disk discussed above having just 5 concentric rings of equally space holes, a more typical disk might have 16 concentric rings instead. For the example shown below then the hole configurations need to be 8, 10, 12 and 16 then a space followed by 24, 27, 30, 32, 36, 40, 45, 48, which will give the four-note F-major arpeggio followed by the higher C-major scale:

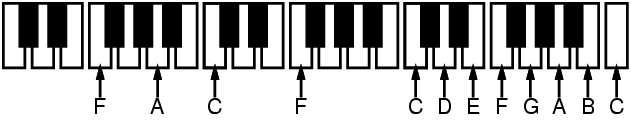
The 12 pitches of the most common kind of siren disk.

The last eight circles of holes give the following temperament of a major (Ionian mode) musical scale (divide each of the above number of holes by 24): 1, 9/8, 5/4, 4/3, 3/2, 5/3, 15/8, 2 (Ptolemy's intense diatonic scale).

A similarly generated minor scale can be made by making a siren disk with the following ratios of hole numbers: 1, 9/8, 6/5, 4/3, 3/2, 8/5, 9/5, 2. (just minor scale).

== Typical siren disk setup ==
The typical siren disk setup consists of a motor, pulleys, belt, and air jet.

The setup at the Ontario Science Centre, for example, includes organ-style keys so that children can play music on the siren disk by pressing the keys to open and close a series of eight valves that direct the air selectively at the eight harmonic circles of uniformly spaced holes of the siren disk.

Dutch inventor Dr. A. R. Naber created "the magic flute", a siren whose pitch is varied not by the number of holes in a circle on the disk, but by the speed at which the disk rotates. During operation the cord connecting the spindle and the flexible drive belt is held between the fingers and moved up and down a tapered shaft of the spindle to vary the rotation and thus pitch.
