= Bar zither =

Musical instrument

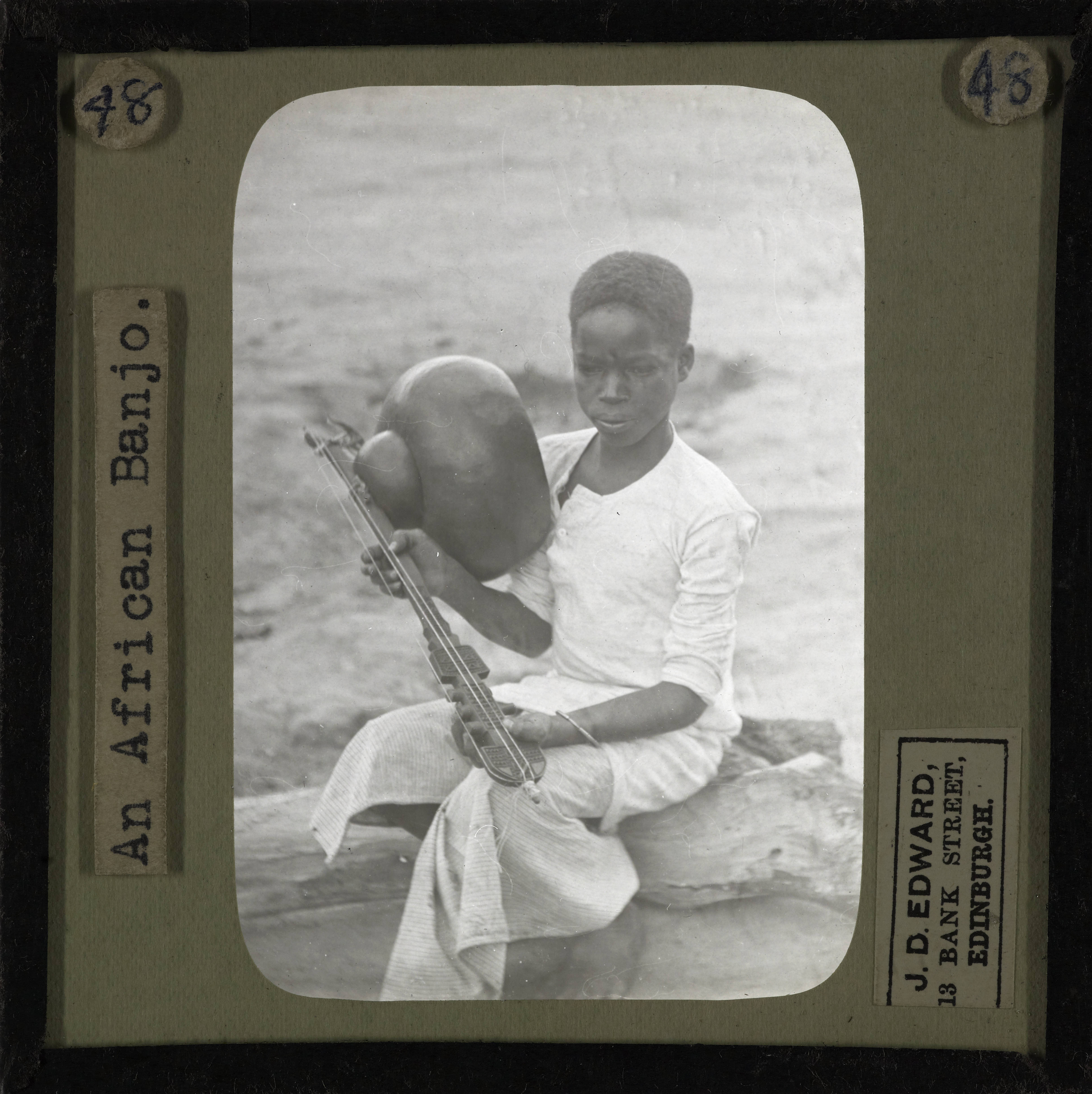
Zambia. Rod zither with calabash amplifier.

Bar zither is class of musical instruments (subset of zither) within the Hornbostel-Sachs classification system for a type of chordophone (stringed instrument), in which the body of the instrument is shaped like a bar.

In the system, bar zithers are made up of musical bows and stick zithers. Musical bows have flexible ends, stick zithers are rigid or have only one flexed end. Bar zithers, whether musical bow or stick zithers, often have some form of resonator. Examples of resonators include the player's mouth, an attached gourd or an inflated balloon or bladder.

According to Sachs,

A stick-zither has a stick in place of a resonating body and always needs an additional resonator, generally a gourd, sometimes the mouth of the player.

Instruments may be monochords (single stringed) or polychords (multiple stinged). They may also be idiochords (string made from the bar or stick) or heterochords (string made of a separate substance than the bar or stick.

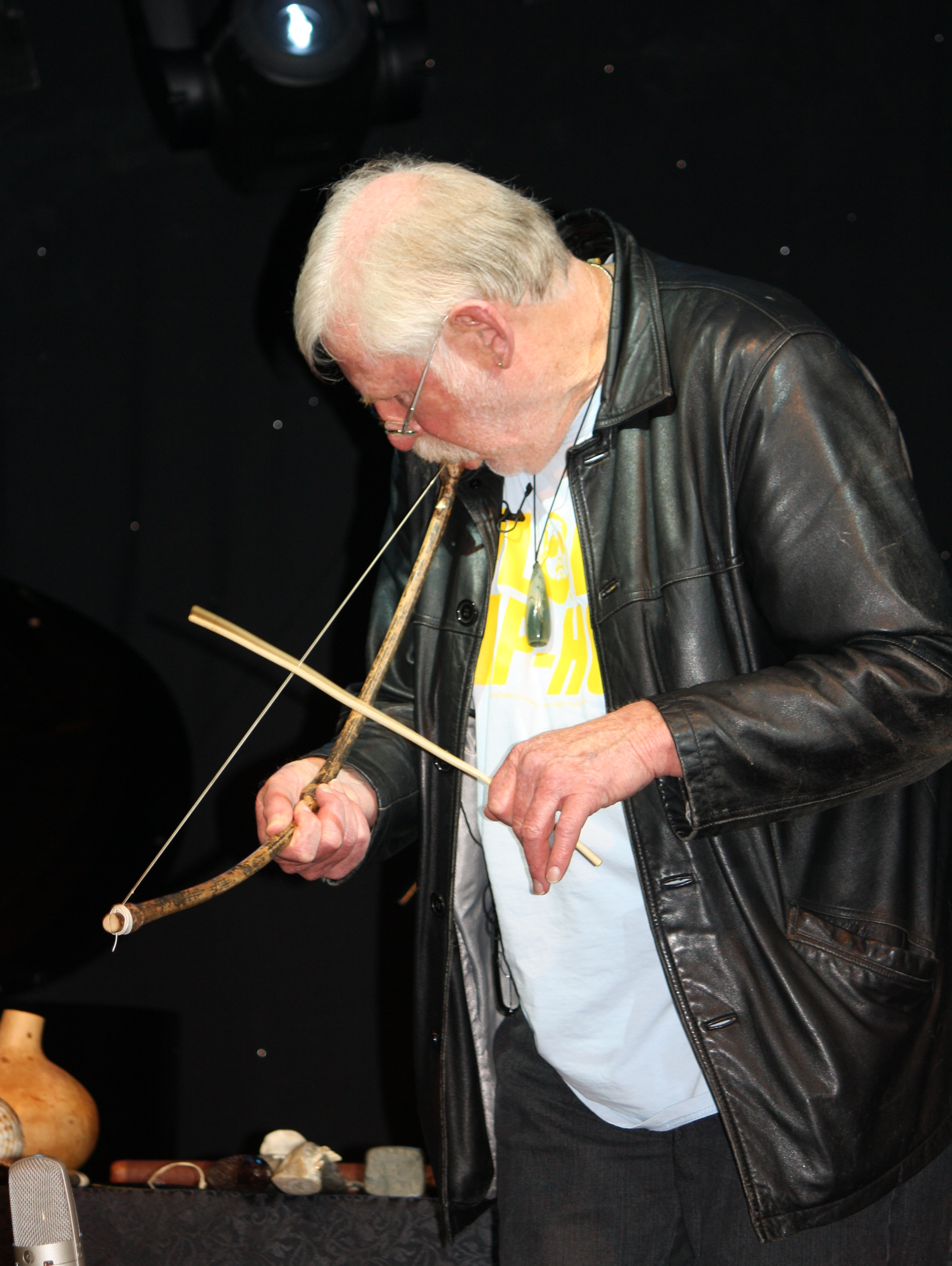
Man playing a heterochord musical bow, using his mouth for a resonator. Heterochords have strings made of a different material than the rigid part of the bow.

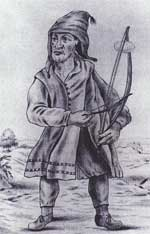
Flanders, 16th century. European heterochord musical bow, using a bladder for a resonator. Bladder fiddle.

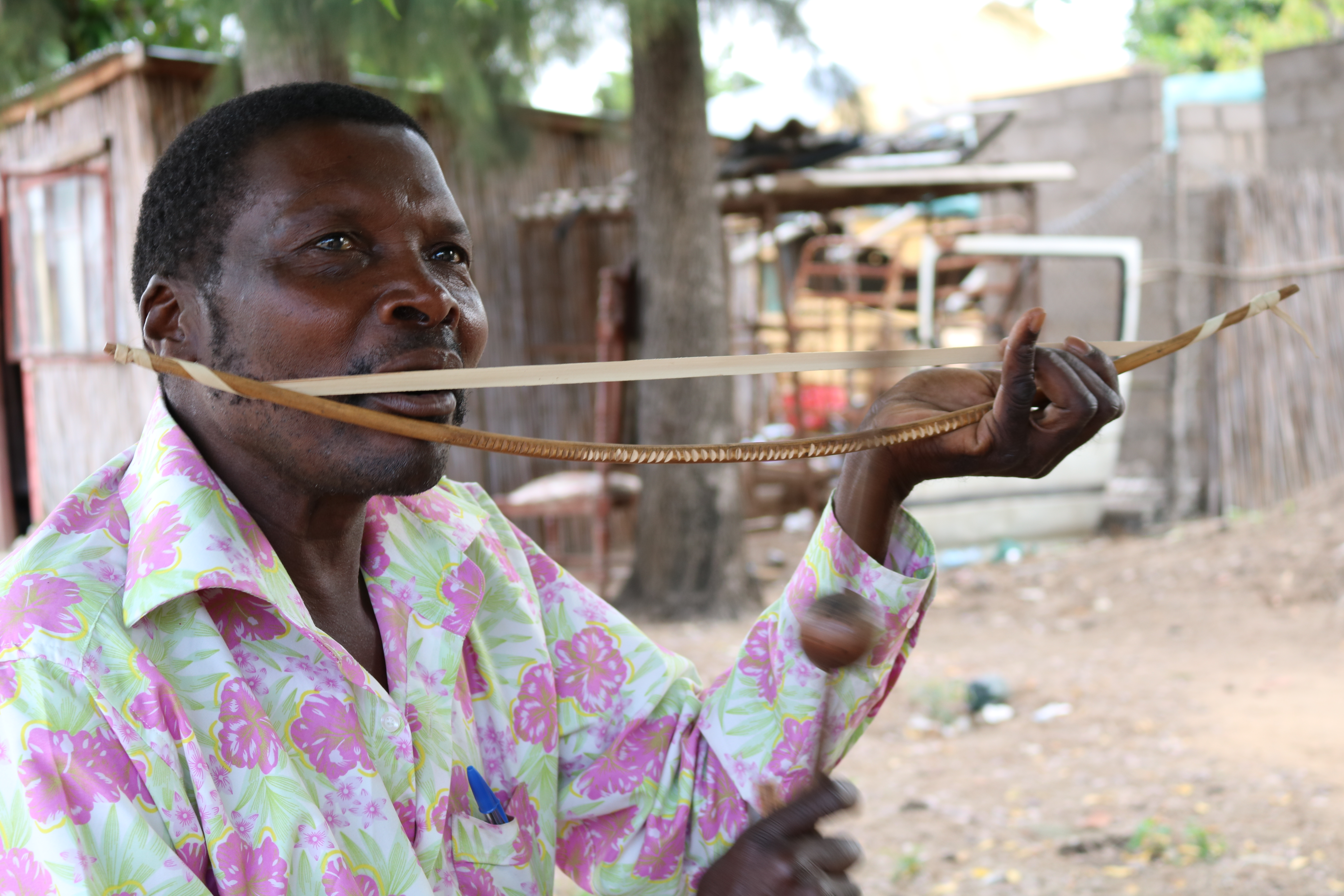
Mozambique, 21st century. Man playing a heterochord musical bow, using his mouth for a resonator.

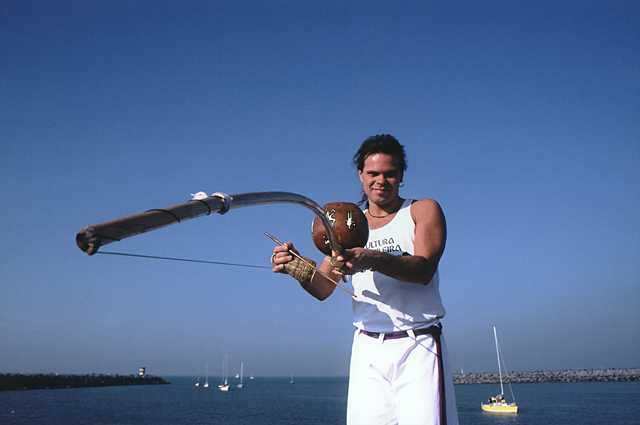
Brazil. Berimbau musical bow with gourd resonator. Tapped with stick to play. String also vibrates caxixi wrattle.

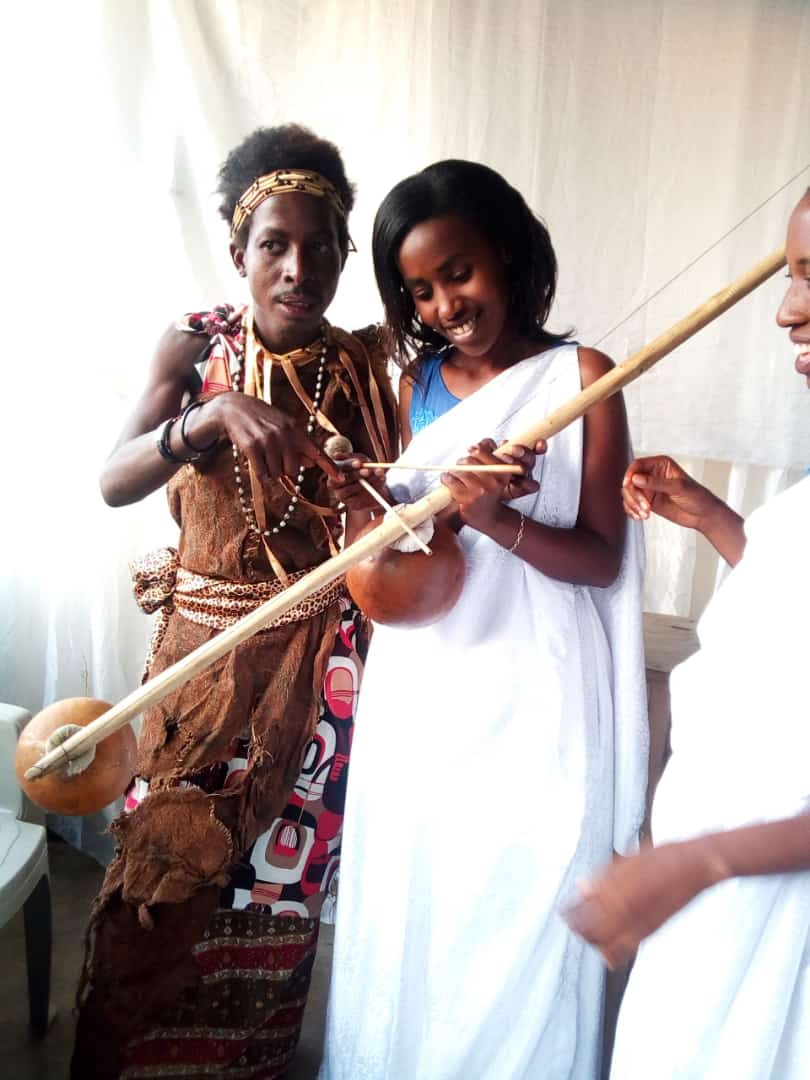
Burundi. Umuduri musical bow.

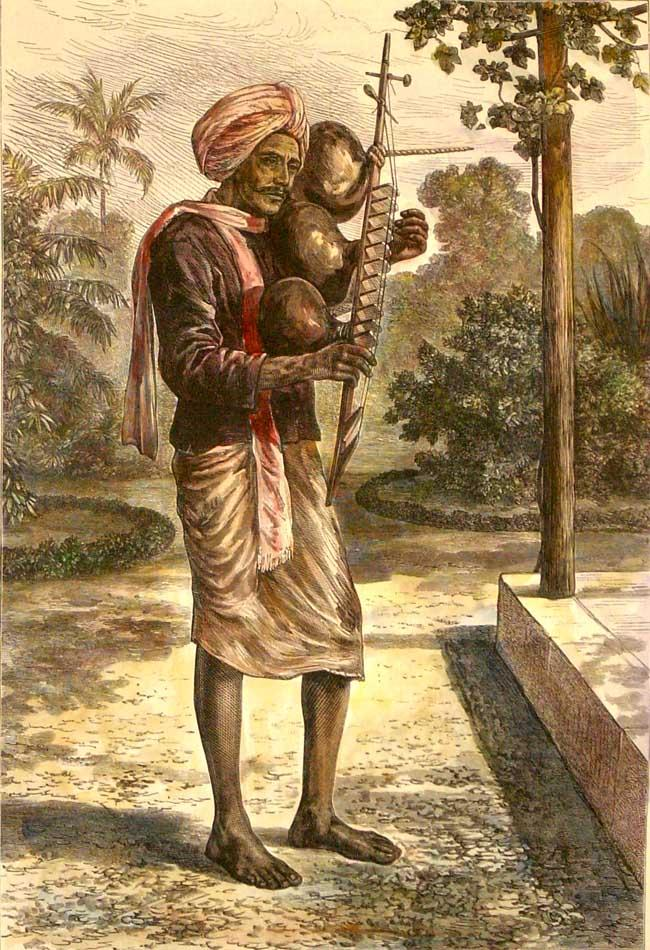
India, 19th century. Heterochord stick zither called a Tingadee, using gourds for resonators.

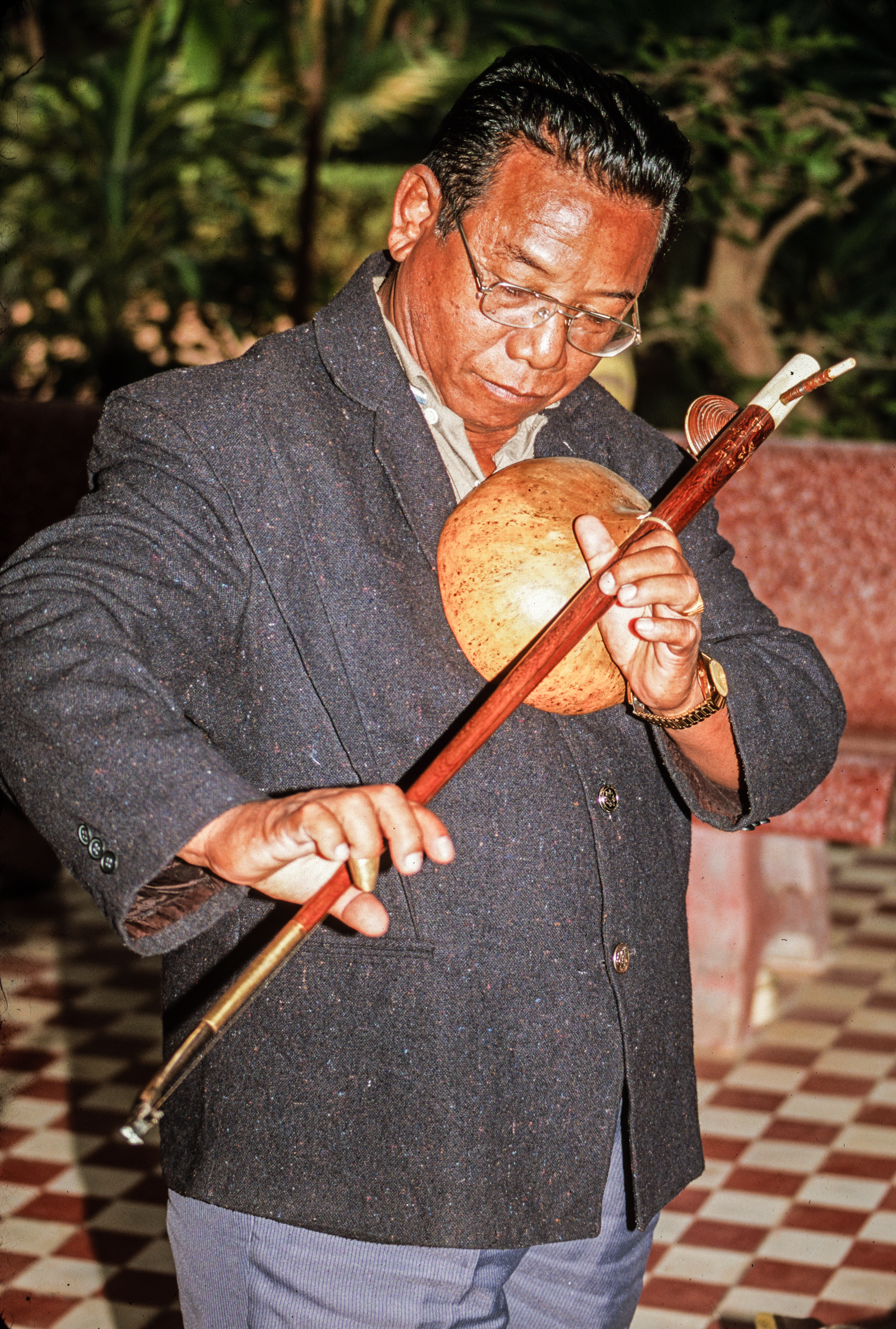
Cambodia, 21st century. Yoeun Mek plays a Kse diev heterochord stick zither, which uses a gourd for a resonator.

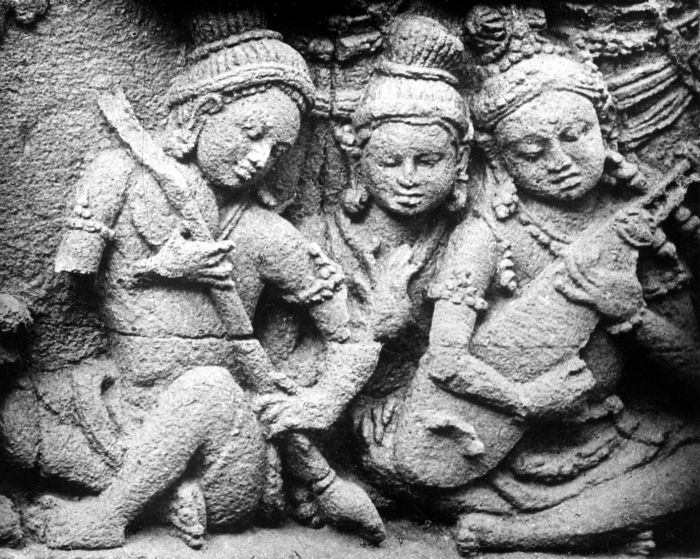
Borobudur, 9th century C.E. Stone relief showing girls playing stick zither and lute.

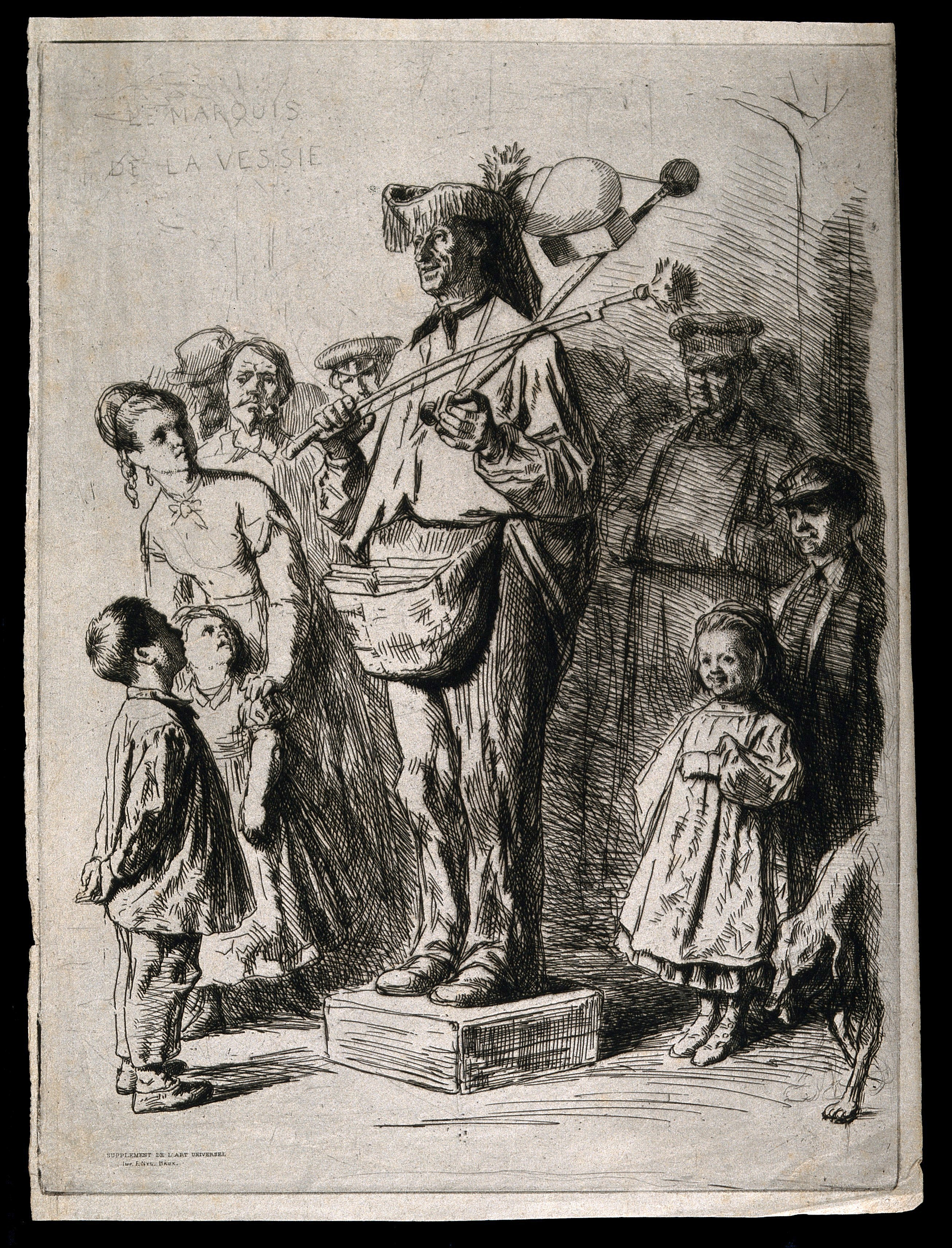
Belgium, 19th century. Heterochord stick zither using a bladder for a resonator.

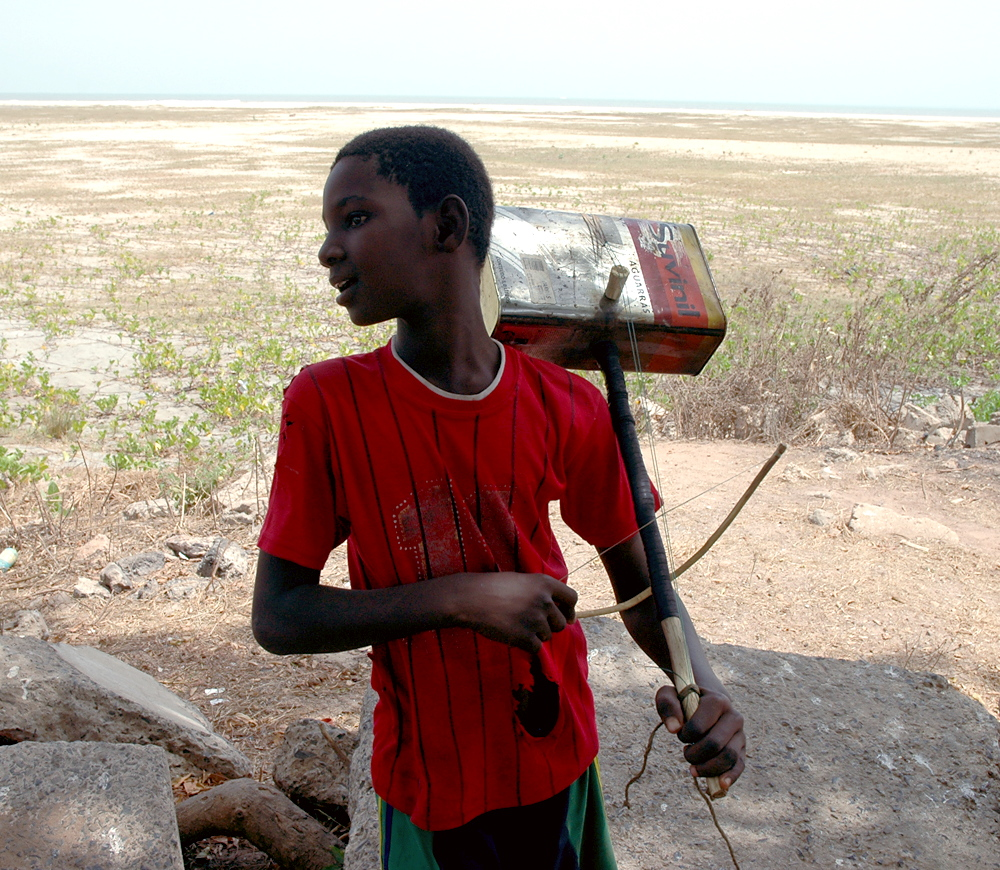
Banjul, Gambia. Heterochord stick zither using a tin can for a resonator. Called a cora.

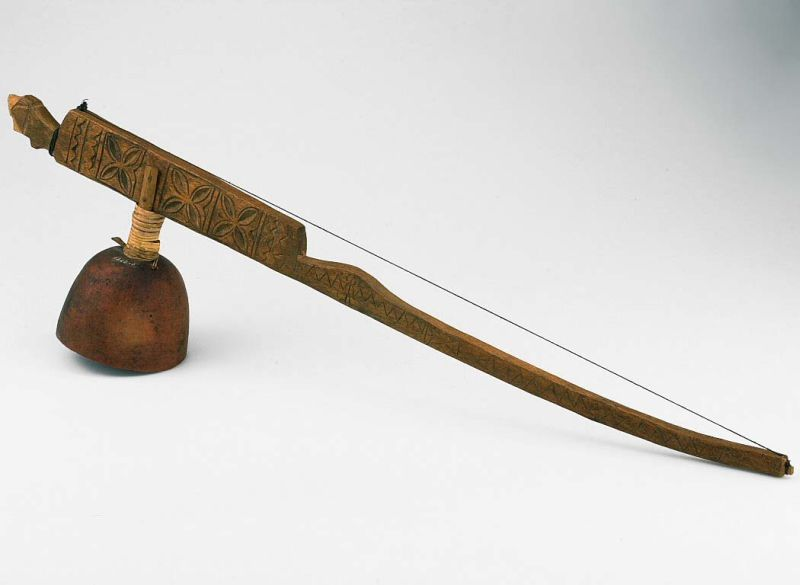
Indonesia, 20th century. Heterchord stick zither, using a gourd resonator. Example of a vertical board being use instead of a bar, called a lath-zither. Still considered bar zither.

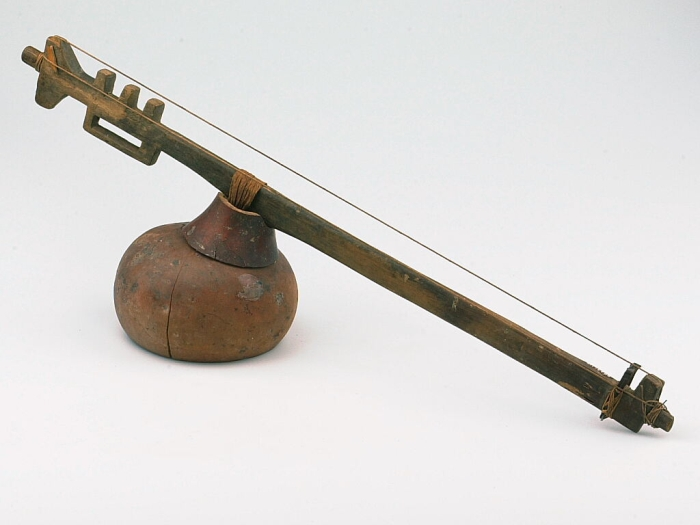
Belgian Congo 20th century. Stick zither, gourd resonator, heterochord.

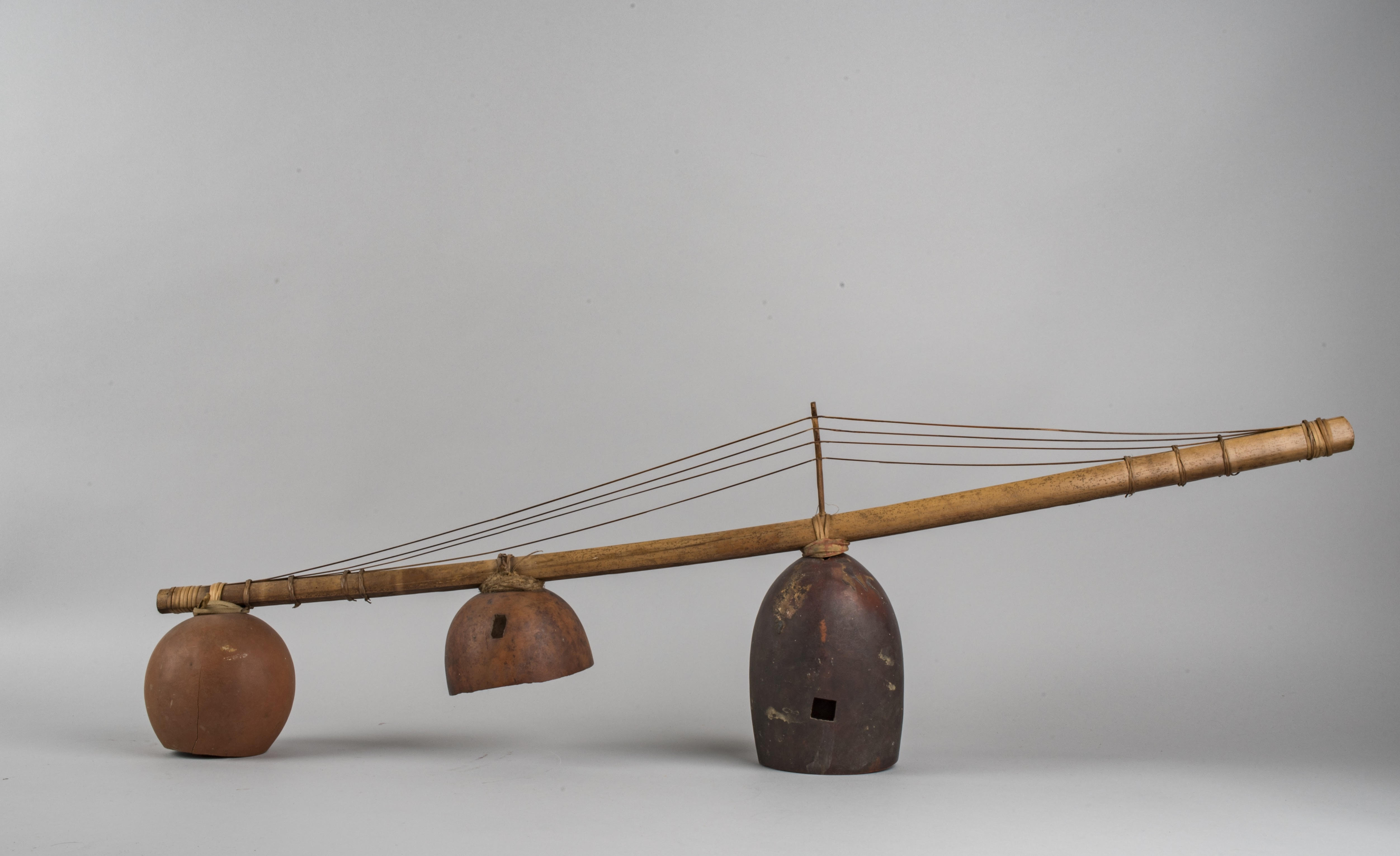
Africa. Mvet, a stick zither from Africa. Hornbostel-Sachs didn't consider a mulitiple-string bar zither (or poly-heterochord bar zither).

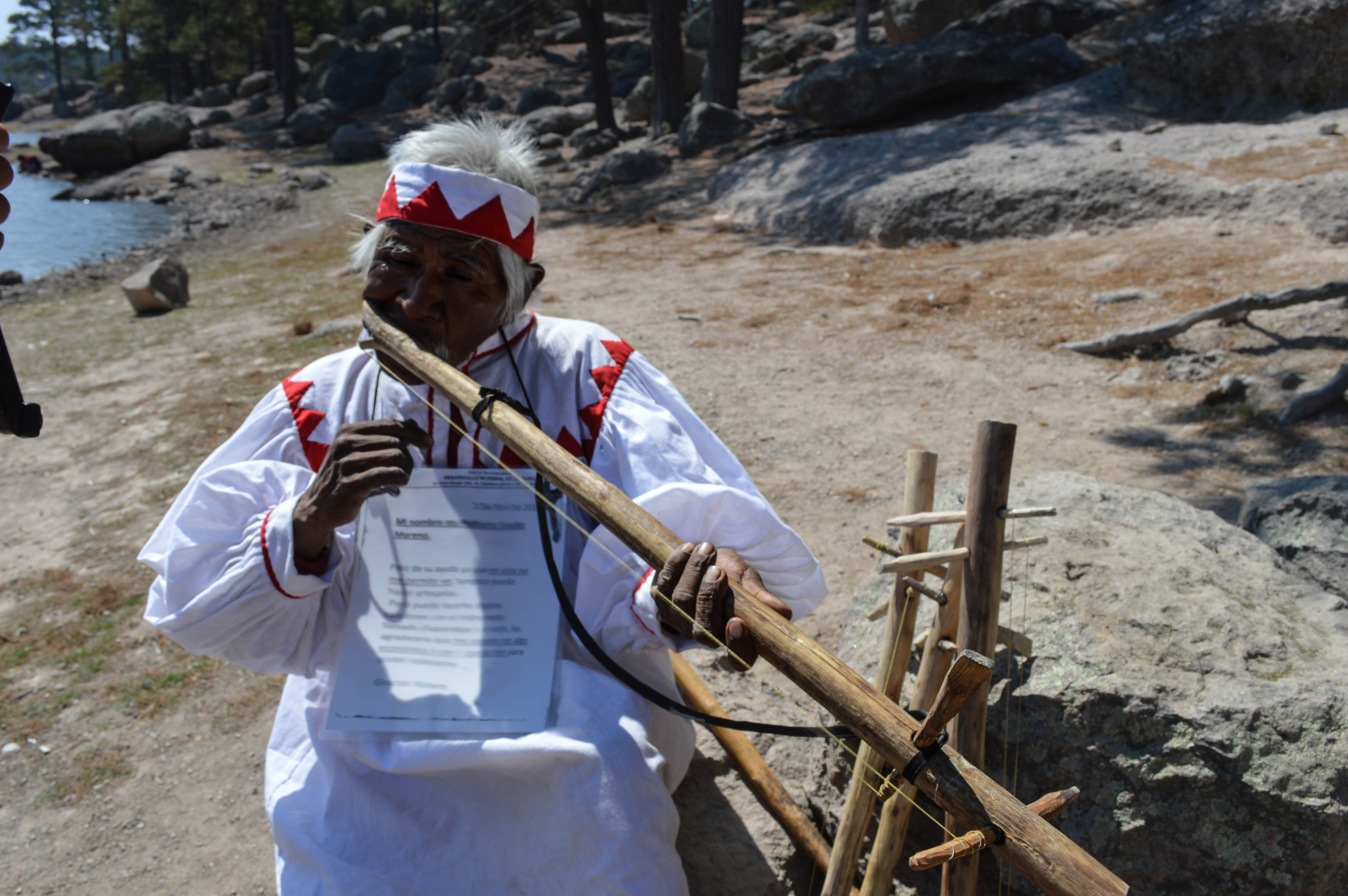
Lake Arereco in Chihuahua, Mexico, 21st century. Stick zither called a "chapareque", Native American instrument. Heterochord bar zither, using mouth for resonator.

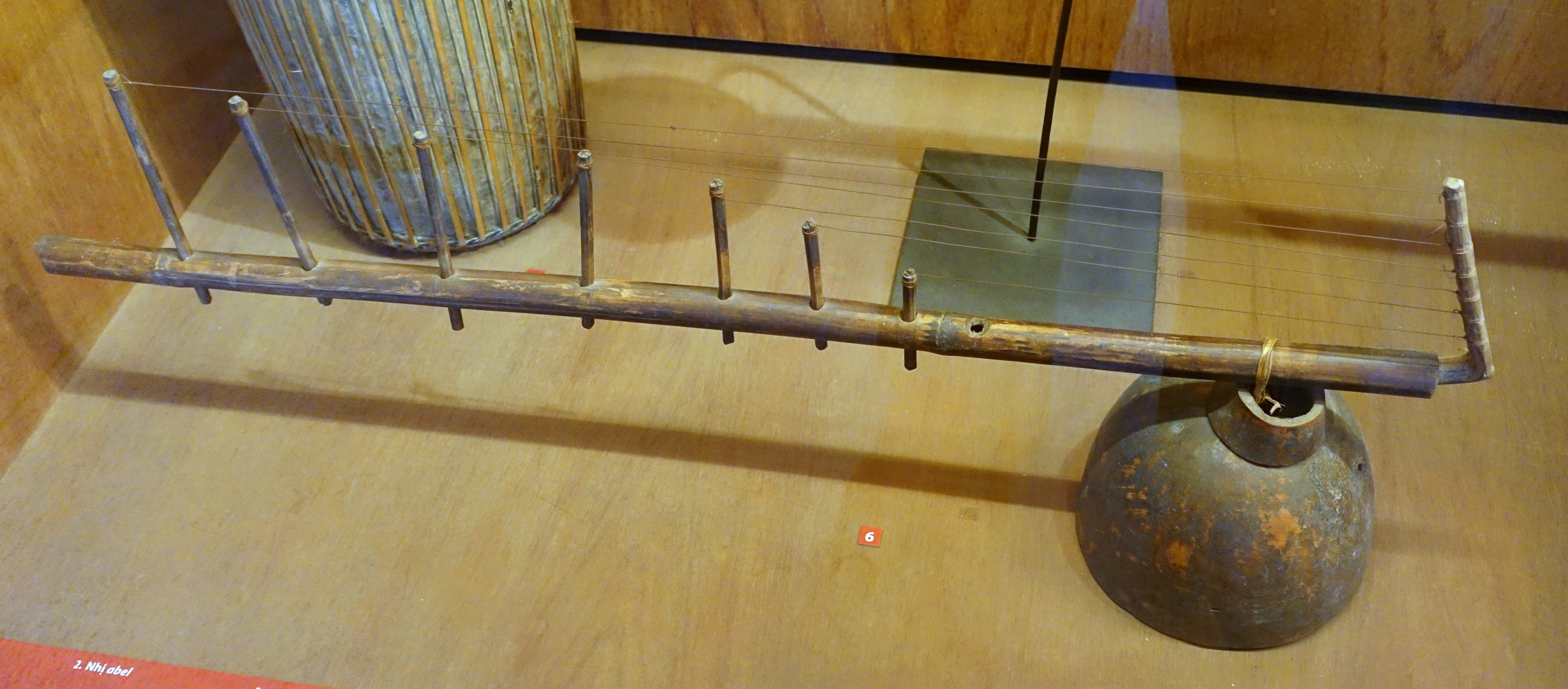
Vietnam. Goong stick zither

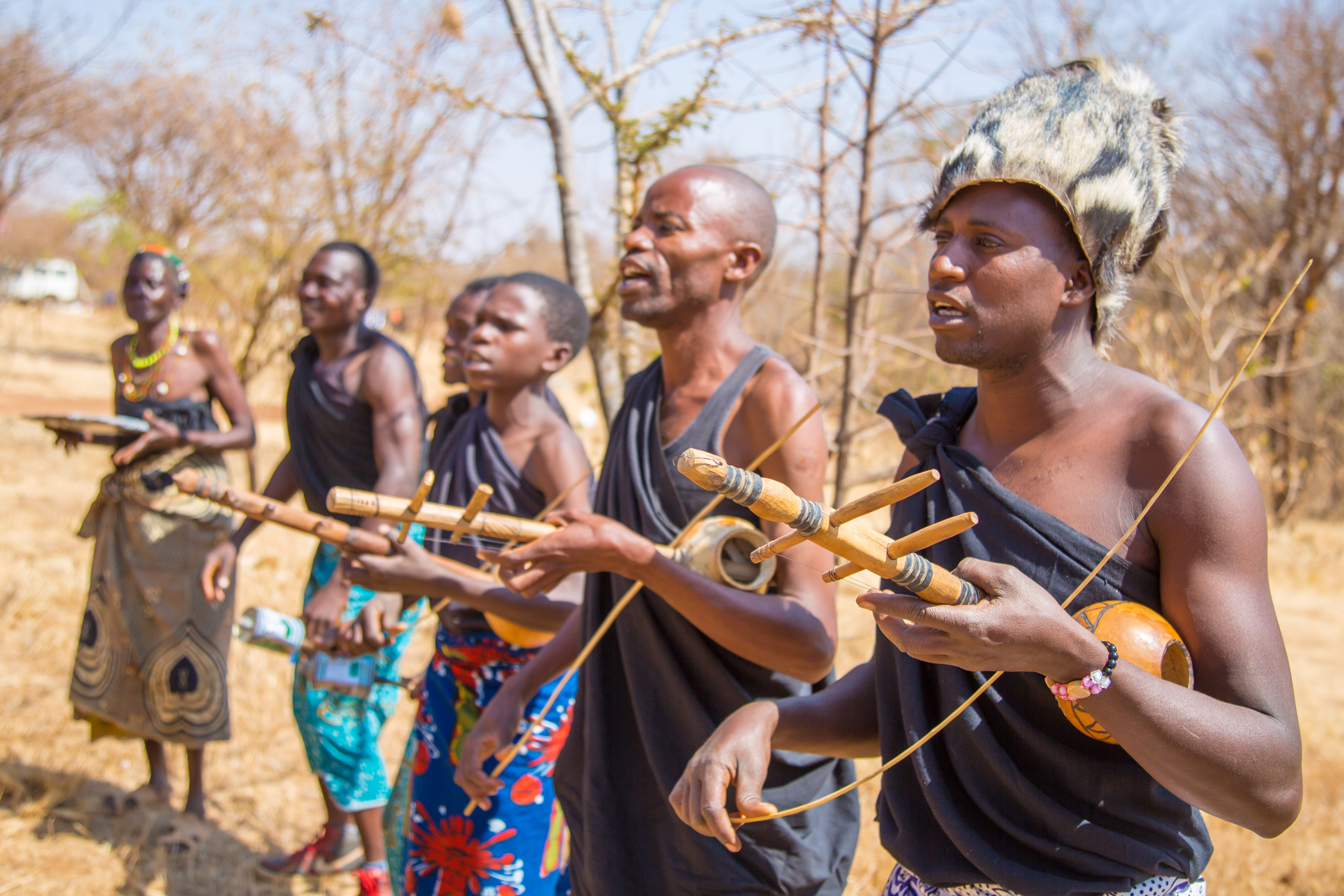
Tanzania. Zeze, a bowed stick zither played here by Gogo musicians

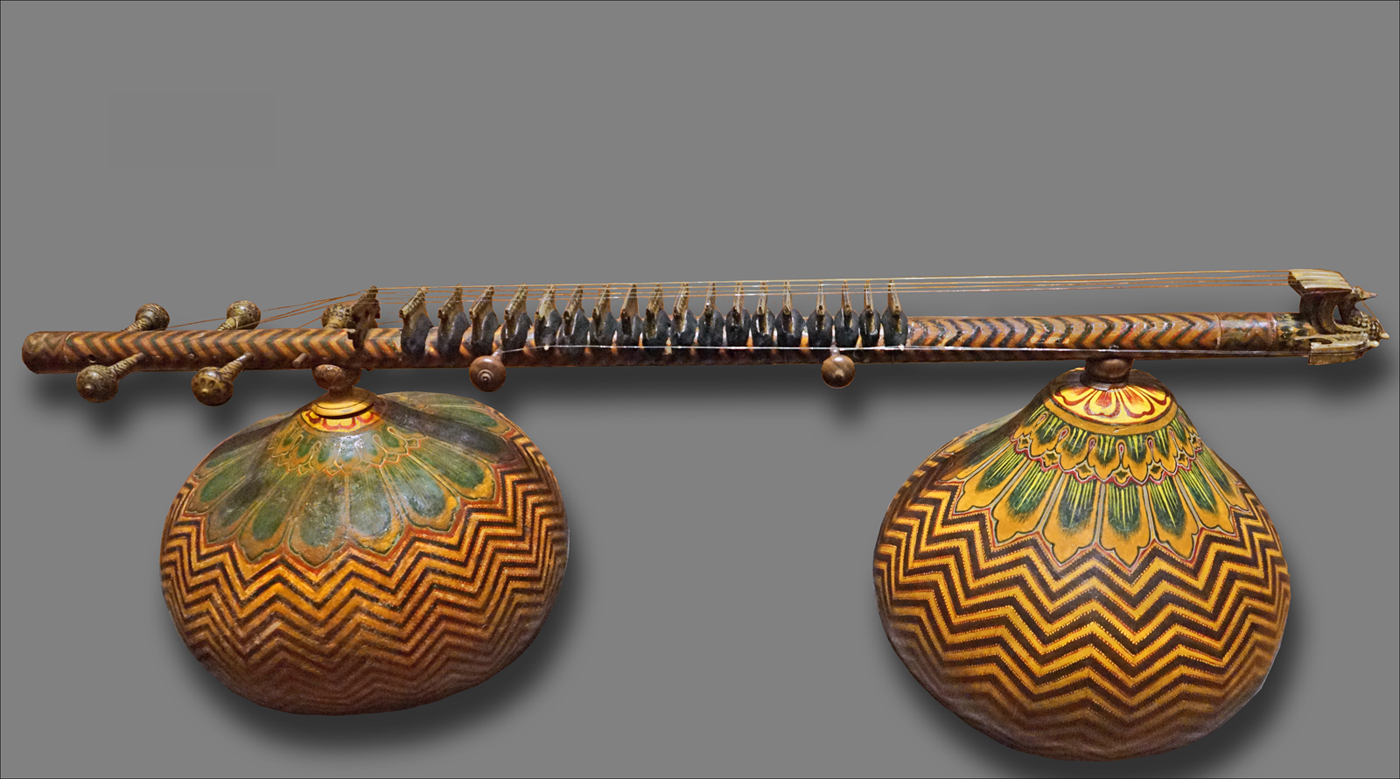
Rudra vina has frets.

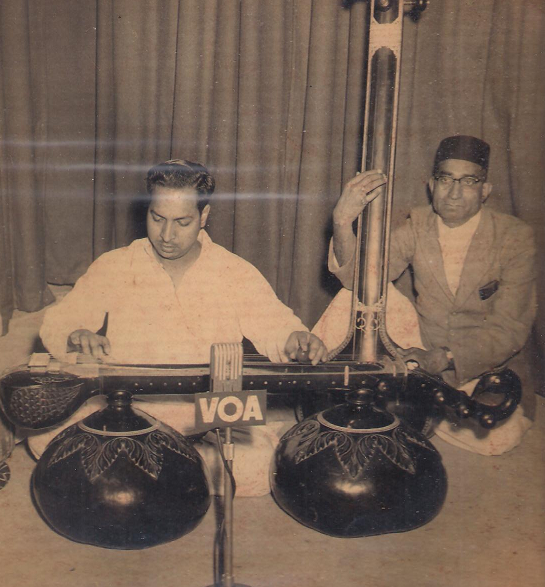
Indian Vichitra veena has no frets.

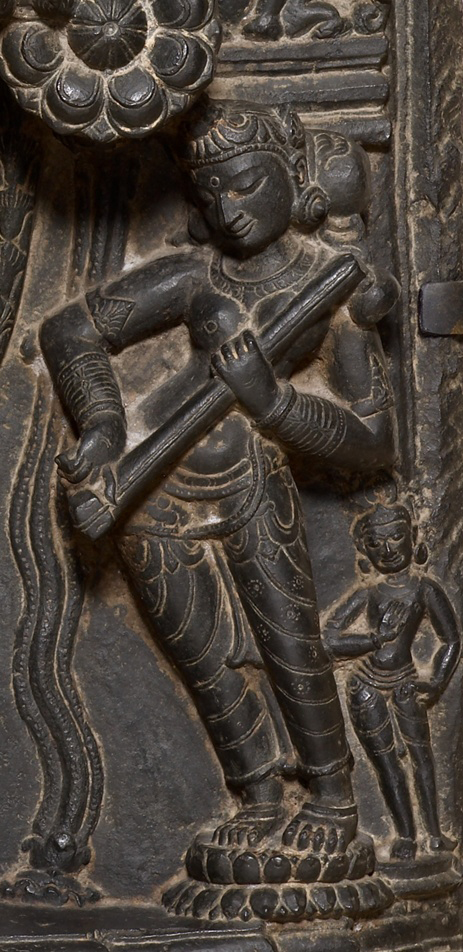
Bangladesh, 10th - 12th century C.E. Saraswati with an ālāpiṇī vīṇā. This was a one-string tube zither or stick zither form of the veena, possibly related to the modern rudra veena.

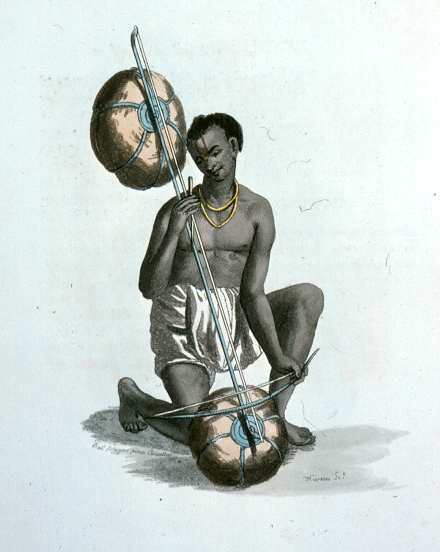
India, 1807. Pinak, a bowed. stick zither.

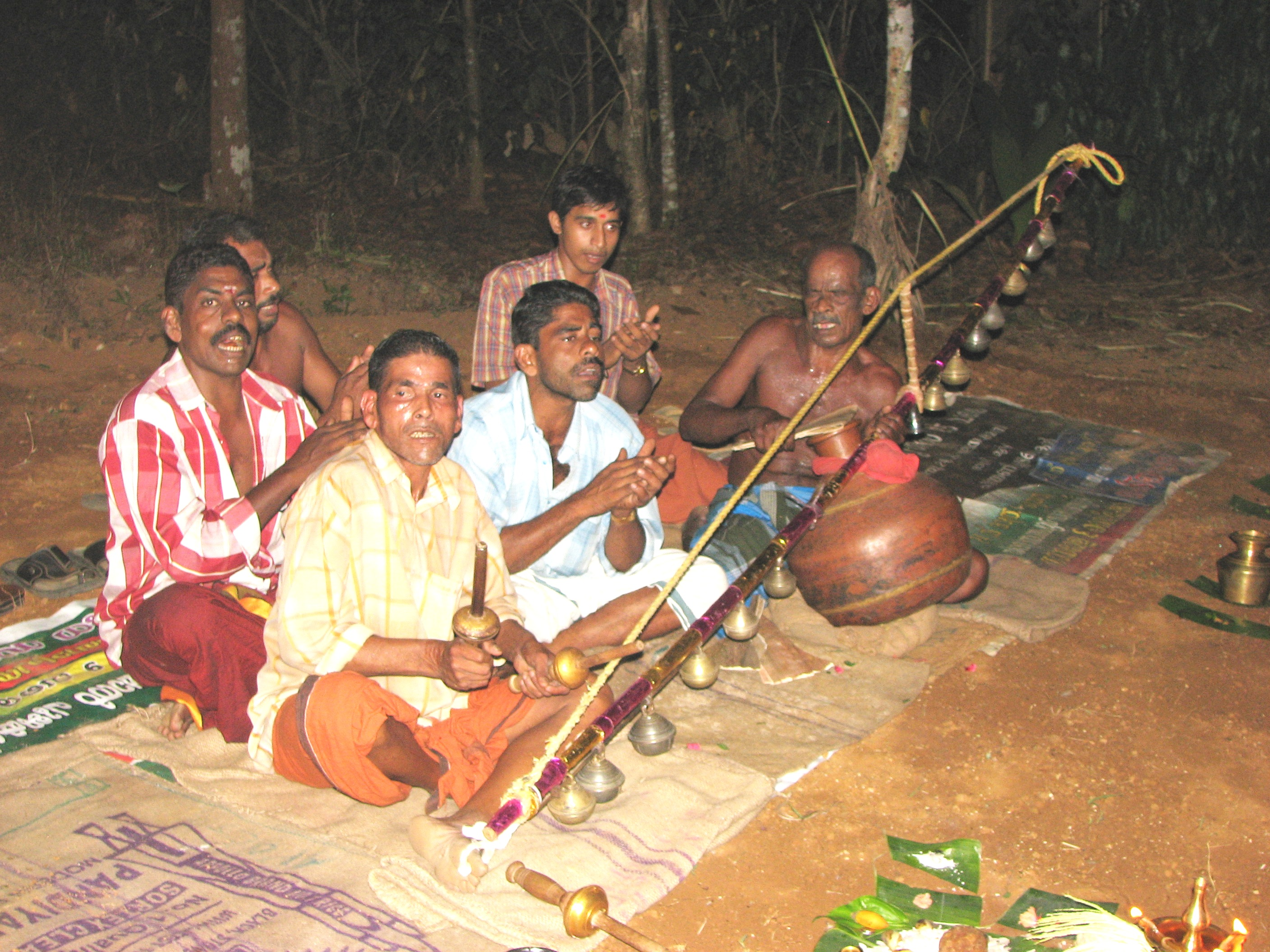
India. An Onavillu or Villu percussion bow

== See also ==
- List of chordophones by Hornbostel–Sachs number
