= Zeze (instrument) =

African stringed instrument

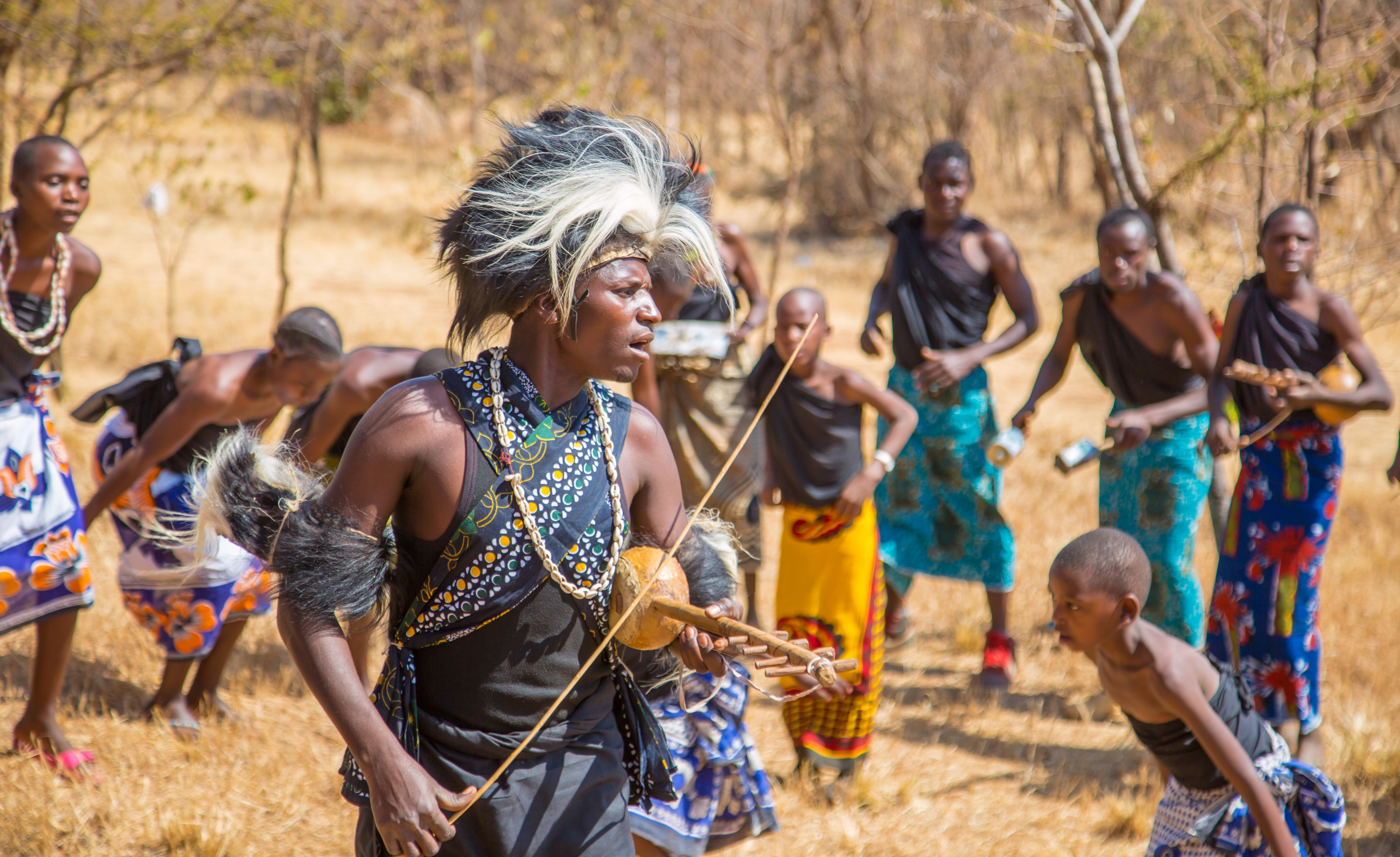
- A man of the Gogo people playing a zeze in Tanzania

String instrument
- Other names: izeze, tzetze, dzendze
- Classification: String instrument
- Hornbostel–Sachs classification: (Composite chordophone)

The zeze, also known as izeze, tzetze, or dzendze (plural: mazeze) is a bowed spike fiddle of the Gogo (Wagogo) people of the Dodoma Region of central Tanzania. It has between one and 14 strings that are made of steel wire or plant fiber, and can be played with a convex bow made of wood and baobab fiber. The number of strings affects how the instrument is played, instruments with fewer strings are generally bowed, while the other with more strings can be bowed or plucked. It can be performed alone, with singers, or as part of a larger ensemble, and can be played at ceremonies, festivals, community gatherings or just for fun.

Across Tanzania, zeze is associated with several ethic groups, and its form different from one region to another, including the Wagogo of Dodoma and the Waha of Kigoma. The Wagogo tradition has received particular attention through Hukwa Zawose, a musician and teacher who learned Wagogo music and later spread it by performing and teaching around the world. Among the Waha of the Kigoma region, near Lake Tanganyika, have a traditional of playing one-stringed zeze, also known as izeze. In both communities, playing zeze was mainly associated with men, at the same time women took part in other musical activities, such as dancing and playing mheme drum. However, women can learn how to play zeze as well.

These traditions are becoming less common today due to the increasing use of Western instruments. The Zeze was traditionally used as a form of entertainment by shepherds, but there are so many other activities nowadays.

Similar instruments include the jejy voatavo (also called lokanga voatavo or herrauou) of Madagascar and the dzendzé ya shitsuva of the Comoros, which are all plucked fretted tube zithers. These plucked instruments are similar to the ekatantri veena and kinnari veena of India, as well as to the bro played by ethnic minority groups in Vietnam's Central Highlands. It is also distantly related to the Indian alapini veena, the Thai phin pia and phin namtao, and the Khmer kse diev, which are all unfretted stick zithers.
