= Đàn brố =

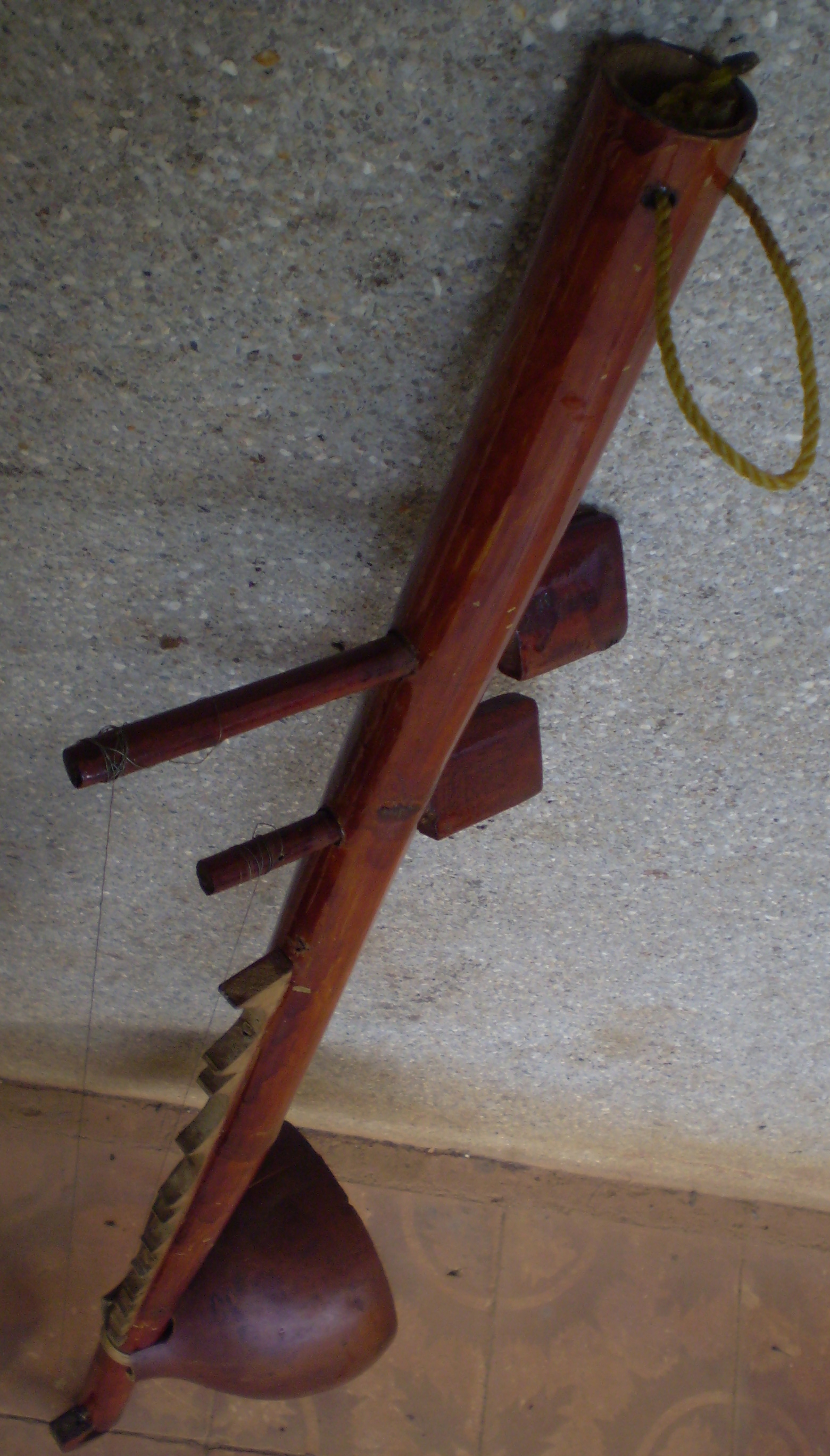
A bro

The bro is a traditional fretted tube zither of the Bahnar, Sedang, Rhađe, Jarai, and Giẻ Xtiêng peoples of the Central Vietnam Highlands.

== Similar instruments ==
The bro is constructed and played in a similar manner to the Malagasy jejy vaotavo (also called lokanga voatavo or herrauou) and the dzendzé ya shitsuva of the Comoros, and both probably share a common origin in the ekatantri veena and kinnari veena (fretted tube zithers) of India. It is also distantly related to the Indian alapini veena, the Thai phin pia and phin namtao, and the Khmer kse diev, which are all unfretted stick zithers.
