= Bharatiya Sangeet Vadya =

Nonfiction book on Indian musical instruments

Cover - Bharatiya Sangeet Vadya (भारतीय संगीत वाद्य), 2002

Bharatiya Sangeet Vadya (Indian Musical Instruments) is a book (ISBN 81-263-0727-7) written by Lalmani Misra. It was published under the Lokodya Granthmala series (Granthak / Volume No.: 346) of Bharatiya Jnanpith, New Delhi. The first edition was published in 1973, the second in 2002. The book was written in Hindi. It was described in a 1974 review in Ethnomusicology, the journal of the Society for Ethnomusicology, as "the most complete, authoritative work ever published on the history of Indian musical instruments."

The book carries an exhaustive documentation of musical instruments, right from the ancient to modern times, with an emphasis on establishing that modern Indian instruments have their origins in ancient Indian, rather than in Muslim and Western, culture. The book has always been in great demand by scholars and musicians for it also gives insight into fundamentals of playing instruments and traces the development in content along with that of the instrument.

== Chapters ==
The book has fourteen chapters:

1. The first deals with discussion of music; its elemental essence; its relation to life and theories of its evolution.
2. The second chapter examines the primary elements of singing, instrument and dance and categorizes the musical instruments.
3. Third chapter describes in detail the Tat-Vadya or string instruments from Analambi, Alapini, Ektantri Veena to Kand, Kinnari, Ghoshvati, Rudra, Saraswati and Vichitra Veena. Almost fifty different veenas have been individually taken up apart from some minor instruments.
4. Avanaddh Vadya (literally Sound on striking) or percussion instruments of all types belonging to ancient and middle period are described and their playing style discussed in fifth chapter.
5. Fifth chapter deals with Sushir Vadya (wind instruments) of ancient and medieval period.
6. Ghan Vadya(Idiophonic or stroke-based instruments) in India have taken various forms—wood on wood, metal on metal and possible combinations. These are discussed in sixth chapter.
7. Musical instruments that are not mentioned in classical texts like Jal tarang, Ghunghru Tarang, Kans Tarang etc. having evolved in medieval to modern period, are documented in the seventh chapter.
8. A comparative study is made of ancient, medieval and modern instruments in eighth chapter.
9. The structure of instruments in their modern evolution is discussed in the ninth chapter, with ample details for building them from scratch despite there being meager details available in ancient texts. This chapter discusses several modern instruments like Vichitra Veena, Rudra Veena, Sarod, Dilruba, Santoor, Sitar etc.
10. The Tenth chapter contains a discussion on availability and evolution of the content for instruments.
11. The Eleventh chapter examines the genre of folk-music and evaluates the role of folk-instruments.
12. A modern scientific classification of instruments based on intensity, pitch, range etc. has been envisaged in the twelfth chapter.
13. Iconic and aesthetic elements of instruments have been discussed in the thirteenth chapter. Instruments are a vehicle conveying essential nature of others to the artiste while transporting his emotions to listeners.
14. The concluding chapter rearranges the whole gamut of Indian musical instruments highlighting the interdependence of evolution of instruments with texts mentioning them. The curve of development being successive, often provided a method to arrange two texts. Finally it established the ancient principles of Indian music in the light of reason rather than tradition or mere convention.
