= Ragini =

Ragini may refer to:

== People ==
- Ragini (actress) (1937–1976), Indian film actress, one of the Travancore sisters
- Ragini (Telugu actress), Telugu comedic actress
- Ragini Dwivedi (born 1990), Indian film actress and model
- Ragini Khanna, Indian Hindi film and television actress
- Ragini Nandwani (born 1989), Indian film and television actress
- Ragini Shah (born 1958), Indian film, stage and television actress
- Ragini Shankar, Indian violinist
- Ragini Trivedi (born 1960), Indian classical musician

== Music ==
- Rāgini, the feminine counterpart of a raga, a melodic mode in Indian classical music

== Films ==
- Ragini (film), a 1968 Indian Malayalam-language film
- Raagini (film), a Hindi film of 1958
