= Ekatantri veena =

Musical instrument

Eka-tantrī vīṇā

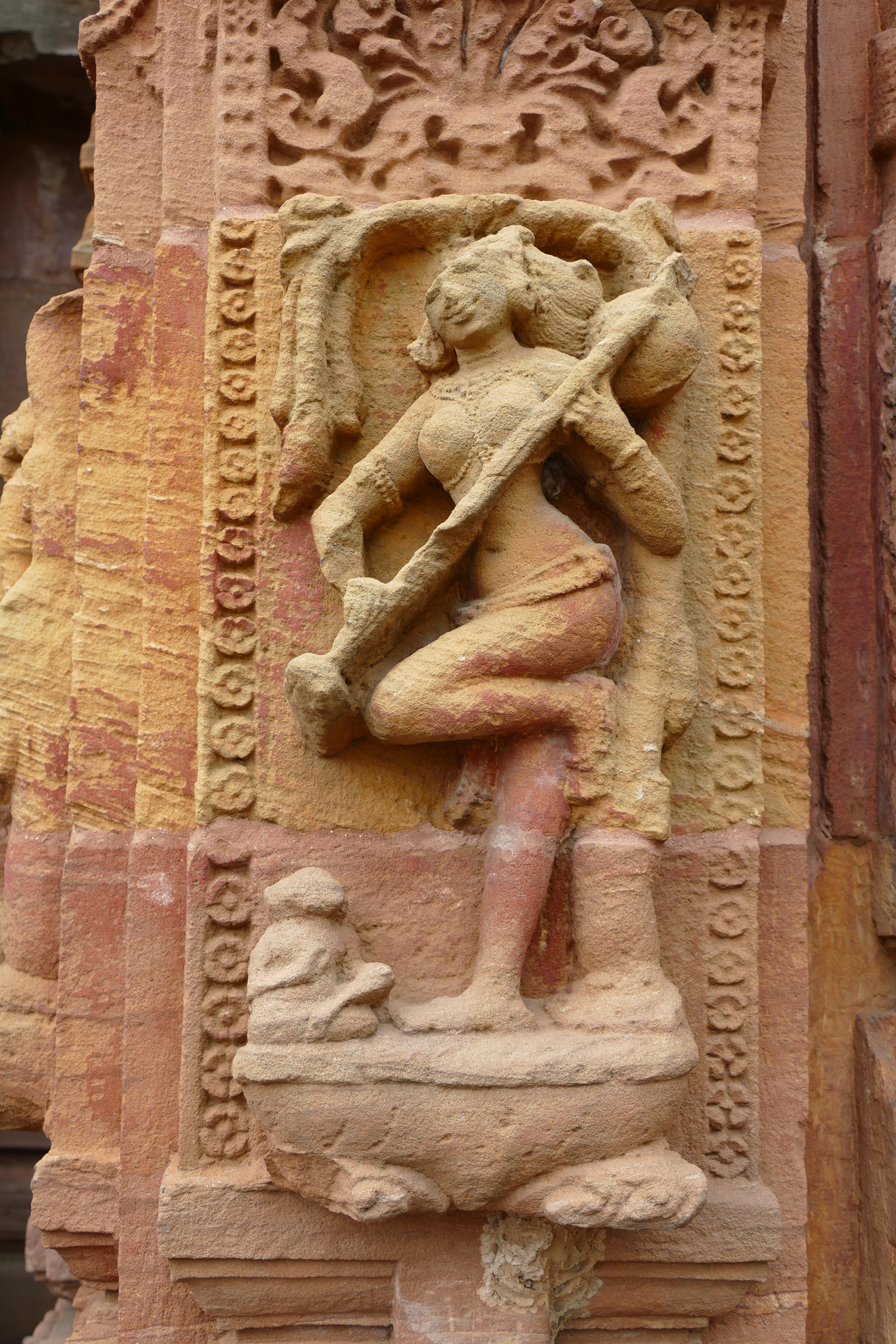
Eka-tantrī vīṇā at Mukteshvara Temple of Bhubaneswar, ca. 10th century C.E.

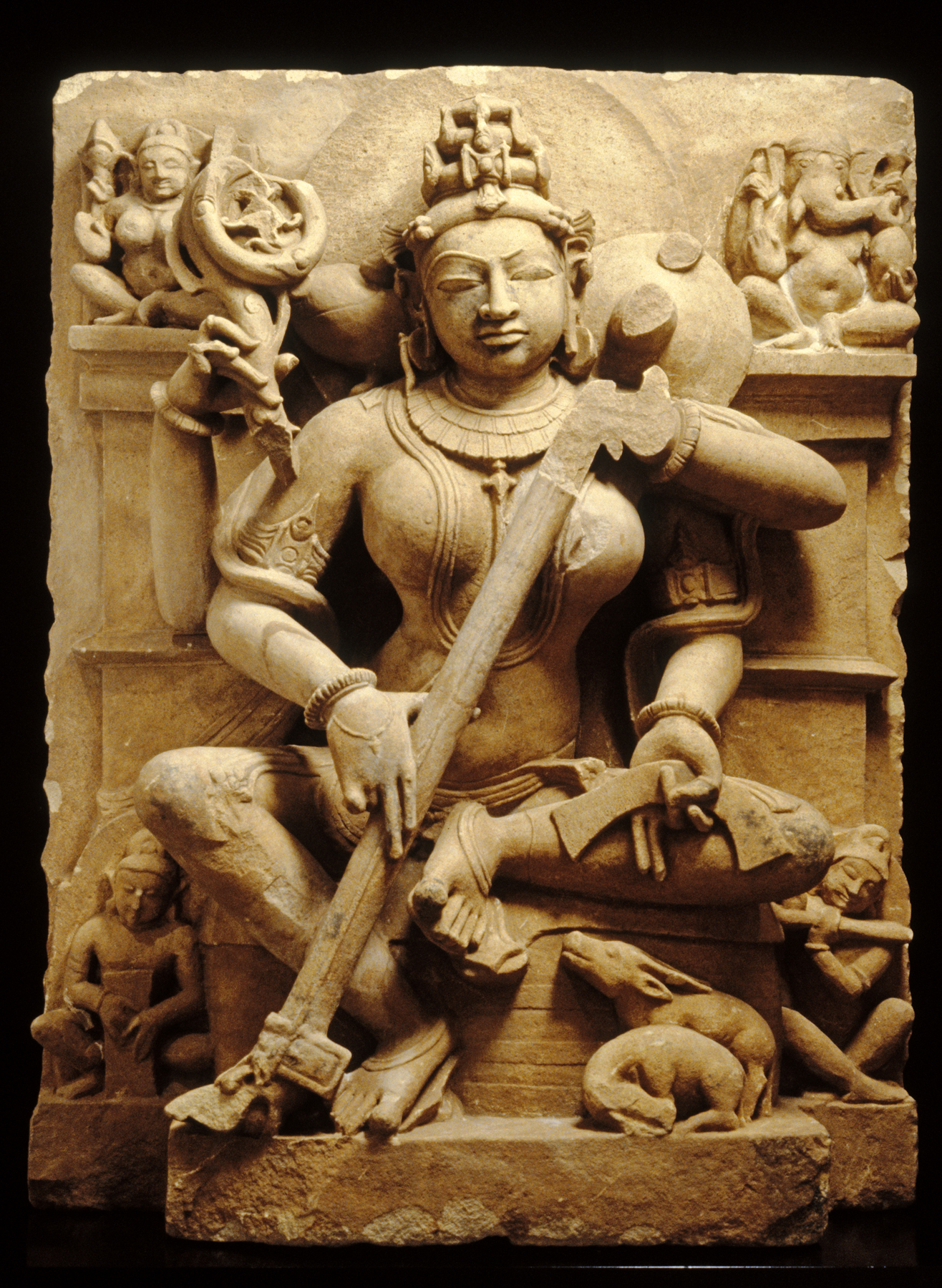
India, 10th century C.E. Image of Saraswati holding an eka-tantri vina, a type of tube zither.

The far-right image shows many details missing from depictions of the eka-tantri vina: the longer length of the instrument, thick tube, the large gourd at the top, the playing style over the shoulder, the stylized mouth at the bottom of the instrument, a bridge on the rectangle just above the mouth.

The eka-tantrī vīṇā was a medieval tube-zither veena in India, with a single string and one or more gourd resonators. The instrument became prominent in Indian music in about the 10th century C.E. as instruments of court music. Alongside the alapini vina and kinnari vina it replaced the harp-style veenas and lute-style veenas in sculpture. It was possibly a forerunner of the rudra vina. It shares its name with the modern single-string drone lute, the ektara.

The instrument is very closely related to the one-stringed alapini vina, an instrument which started out a stick zither but became a tube zither like the eka-tantri vina.

Although the tube zithers and stick zithers are very similar, it is possible that they have different origins. Early paintings of stick zithers in India date back at least to the 5th century C.E. The earliest currently known stick zither is in the Caves of Ajanta at the end of the 5th century. After a period of assuming that tube zithers spread from India to Southeast Asia, modern scholars have been trying to decide if the tube zithers might have originated in Southeast Asia and spread to India. Whatever the origins, Indian influence on musical culture in Southeast Asia is recorded in the archaeological remains of past civilizations.

== Parts of the eka-tantri vina ==
Parts of the vinas from Sarnga Deva's Ratnakara:

- Biradaalu, anchoring point for string at the top of the instrument
- Dandam or dandi the body or tube
- Kakubham, hollow box at bottom end, top curved slightly, bridge sits on
- Naagapaasam, anchoring point for string at the kakubham
- Patrika, bridge
- Tumba, resonator
- Yali or dorika, carved figure on bottom end
- Kramica, shall stick held against string by musician. Sometimes replaced in sculpture by one or two fingers held straight.

== Identifying the eka-tantrī vīṇā ==
Development of fretted instrument

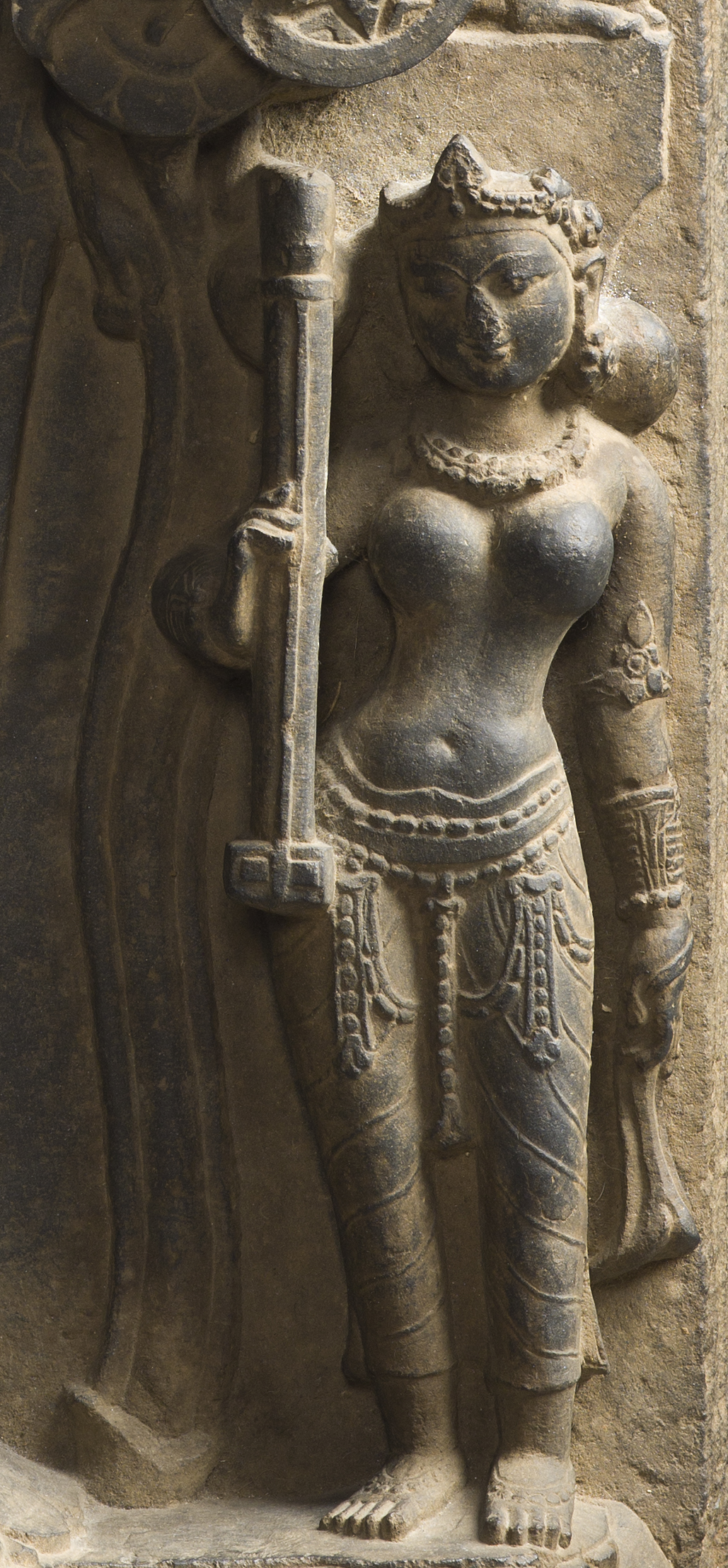
Saraswati holding an eka-tantri vina, ca. 1000 C.E. This image clearly shows the bridge (bottom of instrument) which would sustain the string's note and create a buzzing quality.

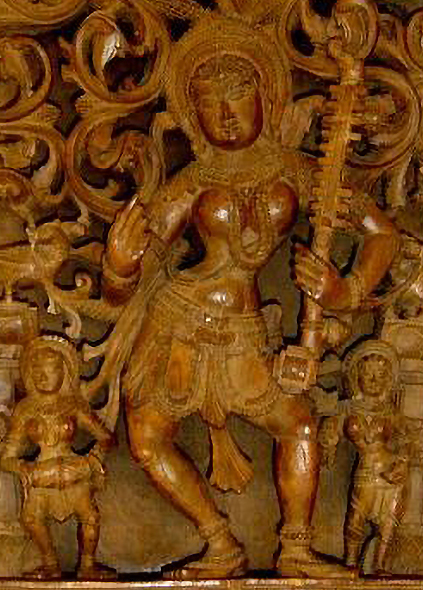
Sarasvati with a fretted kinnari vina, with an apparent makara or yali on the top. Fretted tube-zither vinas are mentioned in literature by 800 C.E., coexisting with the non-fretted vinas. The rudra veena descends from the kinnari veena. The square at the bottom of the instrument is a stylized version of the bridge from the eka-tantri vina.

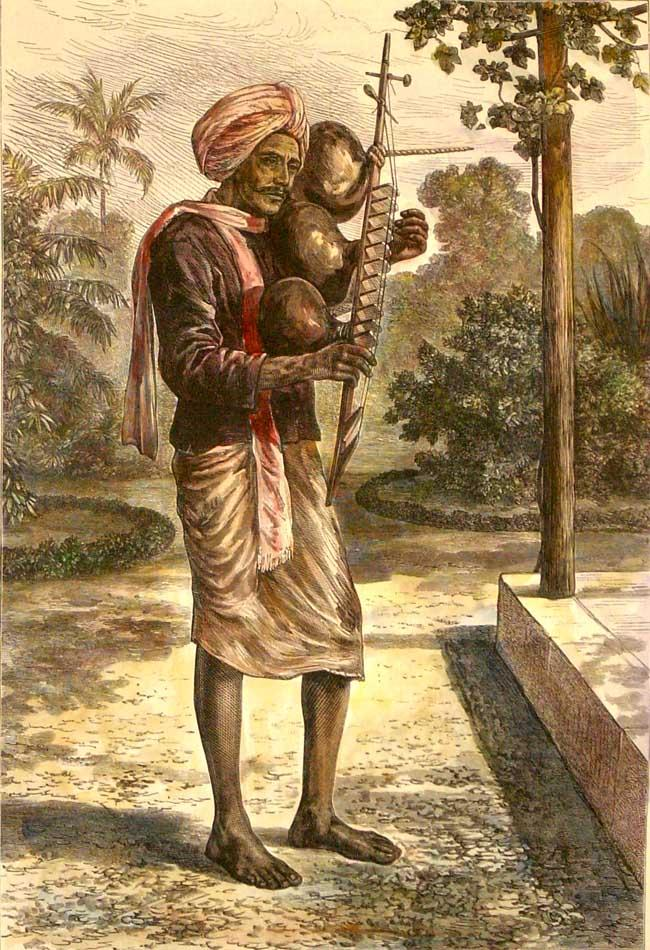
Madras, 1876. Kinnari vina labeled "tingadee." The spike is a bridge, directing string energy to resonator. In later kinnari vinas a third gourd was added in the center, which was pressed into the chest, similar to the alapini vina.

The ālāpiṇī vīṇā, eka-tantri vina and kinnari vina were all mentioned in the 12th-13th century book Sangita Ratnakara by Śārṅgadeva. The 19th-century kinnari vina appears to have traits of both the alapini vina and the eka-tantri vina. The gourd of the kinnari vina pressed into the musician's chest is similar to the alapini vina. The gourd high enough to go over the shoulder is a trait of the eka-tantri vina. Eka-tantri means single string. The alapini vina may have developed into a multi-stringed instrument. The kinnari veena had two strings in the early to mid-19th century; the early 20th century kinnari vina in the Metropolitan Museum of Art has two main strings, and like the rudra veena that came from it, three side strings. The kinnari vina had waxed on frets, and the alapini vina may also have developed frets.

Instruments in paintings and sculpture are not generally labeled, and researchers have had to apply the name eka-tantrī vīṇā (one-string vina) to different instruments. Iconography can't show whether the rods or bodies are hollow, and researchers have had to look for clues in literature.

Instruments in surviving images that are labeled eka-tantrī vīṇā are generally tube zithers with wide tubes and a gourd attached to the top, the gourd held over the musician's shoulder and the other end past their hip, with a single string and no frets. Musician's are shown sliding the straightened fingers of their upper hand on the string, or holding a stick to slide on the string, and plucking with their lower hand.

The instruments are fretless, the depictions showing a single string. The later instruments labeled kinnari vina we're fretted and show traits of both the ekatantri vina and the alapini vina, with gourds that are pressed into the chest and also rise above the shoulder.

In medieval artwork, a second lower gourd has been seen on both stick zithers and tube zithers. Artwork for the eka-tantri vina commonly shows a second carved resonator or gourd resonator near the instrument's lower end.

While the eka-tantri vina had only one string (the meaning of its name), it may have been modified to add additional strings and frets, moving toward the development of the rudra veena. The manner of holding the instrument is similar too. The kinnari veena with its multiple strings and frets also may also be related in the development of the rudra veena, although this instrument was held vertically in artwork, different from the manner the rudra veena was held.

=== The instruments in literature ===
Based on definitions from Indian literature, the unifying criterion is that both have a single string and a gourd resonator. The literature includes the Nāṭyaśāstra (written sometime between 2nd century B.C.E. - 3rd century C.E.) by Bharata Muni and the Sangita Ratnakara (written 1210 - 1247 AD) by Śārṅgadeva.

==== According to Śārṅgadeva ====
In the 13th century, the Sangita Ratnakara placed vinas into three categories: fretless (into which the eka-tanktri vina was placed), harps, and fretted vinas (which included the alapini vina and the kinnari vina). Frets were possibly introduced as a reaction to the invention of the 12-string scale, ca. 700–800. In 1400, the frets on the kinnari vina were attributed to Matanga (800 A.D.) the author of Brhad-desi.

For the eka-tantri vina Śārṅgadeva described an instrument made of Khadirah wood, less than a yard long (alternative translation says 3 arm lengths long), with a dandam "a stetched palm" (about 5-8 inches) in circumference, and 1.5 inches narrower on the bottom where a yali might be carved.

In comparison, the alapini vina Śārṅgadeva described was an instrument 36 inches long, the red sandalwood or Khadirah wood or bamboo rod 2 inches in circumference. The cup (tumba) was made from coconut, and its string was reportedly made of silk, producing a delicate sound.

==== Modern researchers ====
Researchers Piyal Bhattacharya and Shreetama Chowdhury described the eka-tantrī vīṇā as being a larger instrument, with a "bigger tube" and bigger gourd, compared to the ālāpiṇī vīṇā, which they described as a stick zither. The researchers looked at where the instrument's gourd was placed while playing; they indicated instruments with the gourd over the shoulder were eka-tantrī vīṇās and those pressed against the chest were ālāpiṇī vīṇās.

Patrick Kersale applied the label ekatantri to a 10th-century tube zither from the Pala Empire, a long instrument with a squared base and raised bridge-like piece (that lengthened the time the string would sound). Like on the modern pinaka vina a stick was slid on the string to determine the notes. With the kse diev, the gourd is pressed with different pressures into the player's, and the ring finger of the right hand plucks, while the left hand applies pressure on the string at the players chest. The purpose of the bridge may also have been to create a "buzzing" quality to the note (known in Indian classical music as jivari.

The writers for the vīnā entry in the New Grove Dictionary of Musical Instruments called the ālāpiṇī vīṇā a stick zither, in which the stick might be a bamboo or wooden tube. They focused on how the vinas were played. The gourd on the ālāpiṇī vīṇā was cut to form a cup or bowl, the opening of which could be placed against the musician's body while playing, creating a "closed resonance chamber". On the eka-tantrī vīṇā and later Kinarri vina the gourd (bottom intact) used for the resonance chamber rested over the musician's shoulder. These latter two might have a second or third gourd added further down, creating the modern kinarri vina and rudra veena

In his book Bharatiya Sangeet Vadya, Lalmani Misra used Śārṅgadeva's work to describe the Eka-tantri. The body of the instrument, was 3 arm-lengths long and a hand's breadth wide, hollowed out to form a tube, with a bore of 1.5 forefinger widths. A borehole (perpendicular to the instrument's bore) allows the resonating sound in the tube to pass into each gourd resonator; the perpendicular bores are 2 forefingers or 3 pinky-fingers wide. The gourds are secured to the eka-tantri's wooden stem using gut cord, passing through holes made in the stem, down through a hole in the top of the gourd; the thread goes through a pair of holes in the top of a coconut, set inside the gourd (with the rounded side, pressing against the sides of the gourd and toward the stem). On the instrument's lower end, the bridge (kakubh) is attached, its surface not flat but rounded like a tortoise shell. On top of the bridge a patuli (metal plate forming a spike) was placed in the center.

=== Symbolism ===
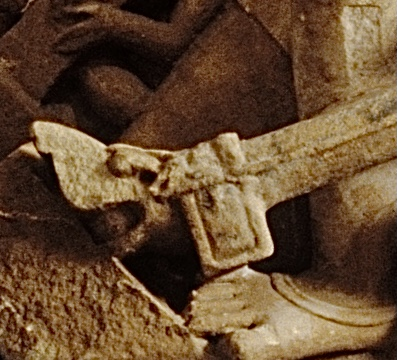
Ca. 10th century C.E. Makara or yali on an Eka-tantri vina.

Different symbolism appears on the instruments over time. In Hinduism, the instruments have been associated with the gods Shiva, Saraswati, and Nataraja. Shiva has been portrayed playing it romantically for Paravati, and as an ascetic, Natajara in his form as the divine dancer. Saraswati is a goddess of flowing things, including water, wisdom and music. Much less frequently, Krishna has also been portrayed playing the vina and dancing; the instrument is not iconically associated with him, as his instrument is the flute.

The instrument has been portrayed in Buddhist temple art in the hands of humans, as well as celestial kinnaras, half human, half bird figures.

Some kinnari vinas in museums seem to have bird-related carvings and feathers on the ends. Some alapini vinas and eka-tantri vinas have very styled ends that resemble the heads of monsters, similar to the Makara water monster's or the Yali's. Both monsters had forms that included an elephant's trunk, a feature found on some kinnari vinas.

== Similar instruments in other cultures ==
Similar plucked fretted tube zithers, which may derive from theekatantri veena, include the đàn brố or bro of Vietnam's Central Highlands, the jejy vaotavo (also called lokanga voatavo or herrauou) of Madagascar, and the dzendzé ya shitsuva of the Comoros.

== Eka-tantri vinas ==
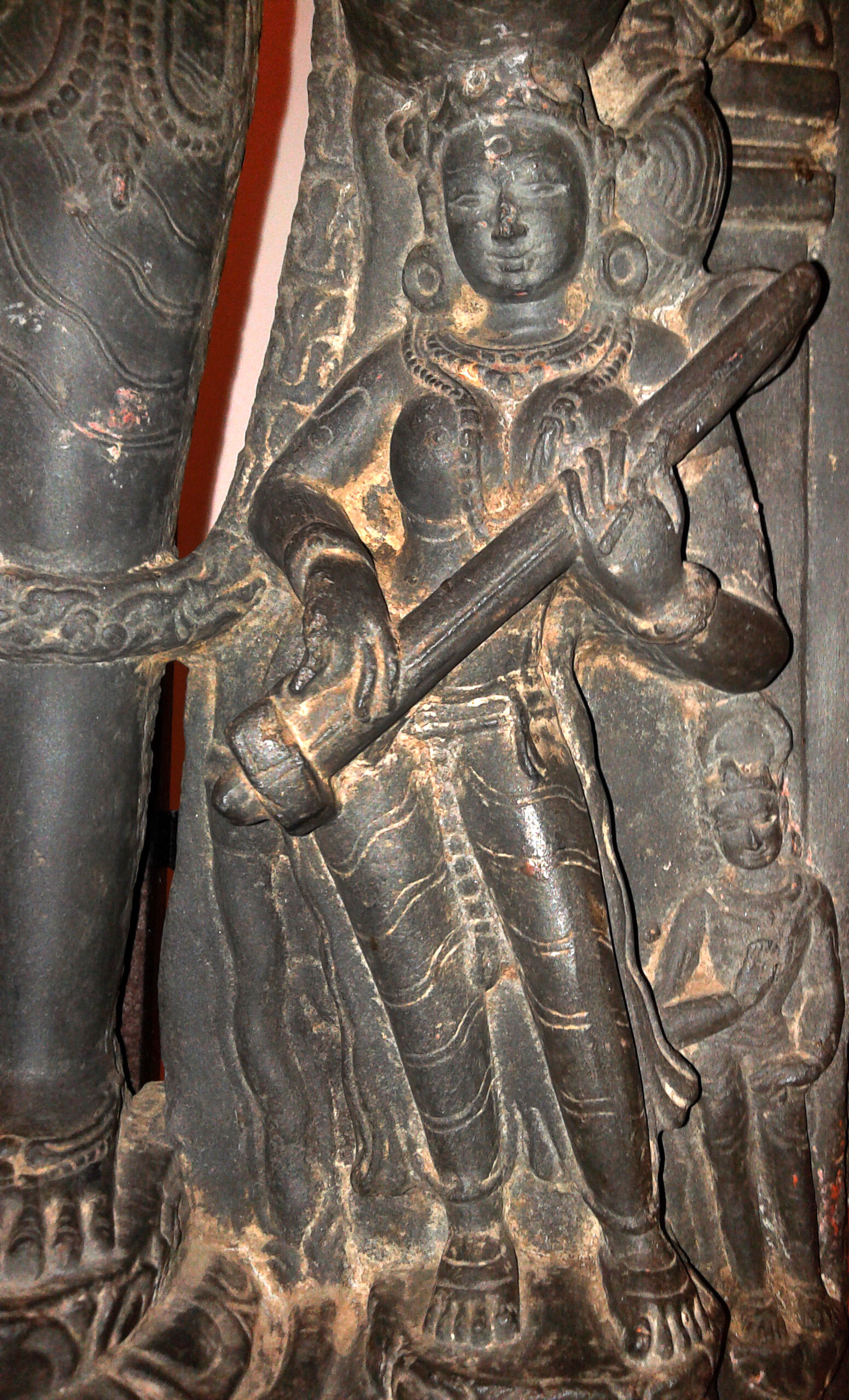
Bengal, India. 11th century C.E. Saraswati playing Eka-tantri vina. Her left hand is holding a stick, which may be like the slide on a Pinaka veena. That stick is not uncommon in the Pala Empire made sculptures. The gourd is resting over her shoulder.

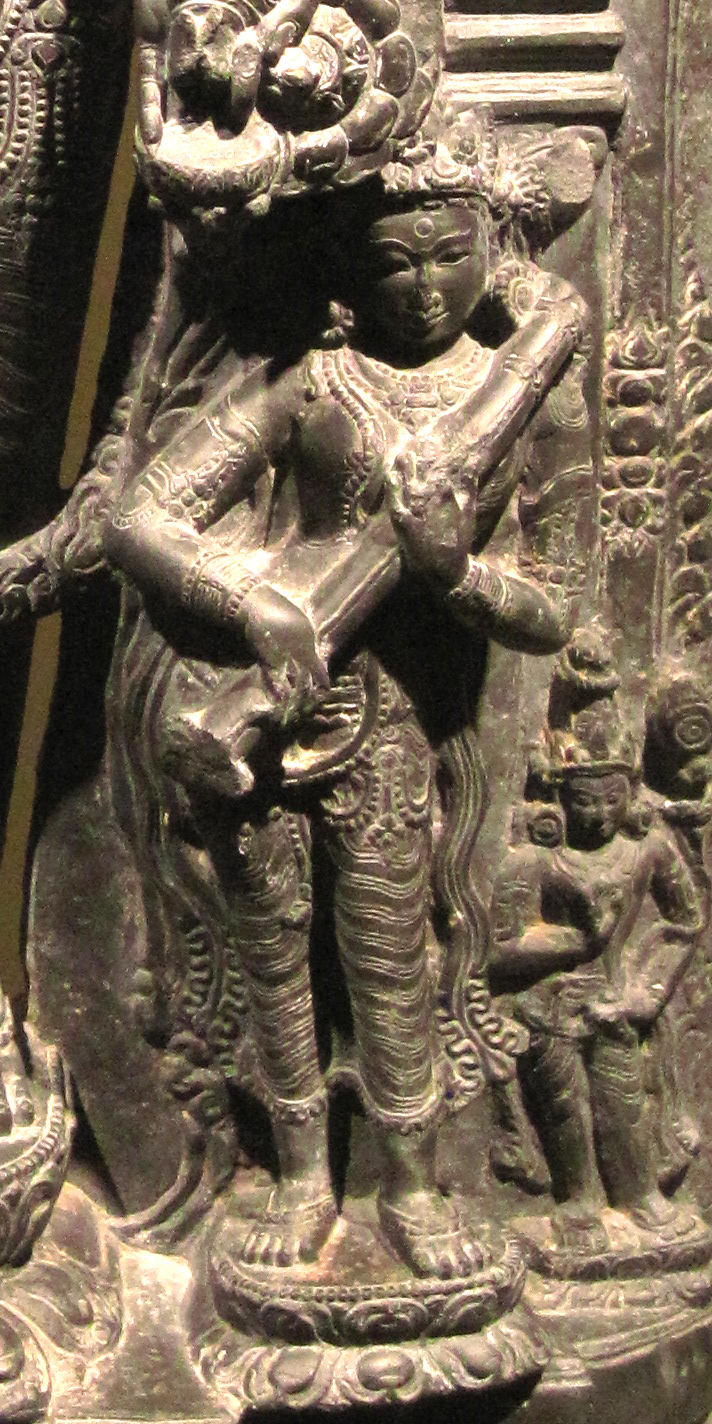
Saraswati with alapini vina or eka-tantri vina, 12th century.

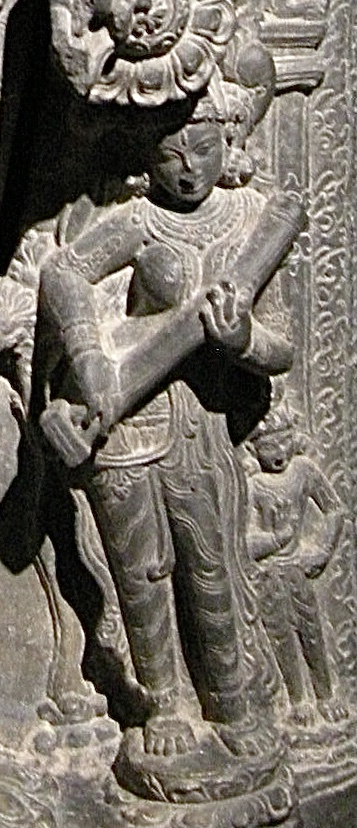
Saraswati with an alapini vina or possibly eka-tantri vina. The instrument has no apparent resonator except the thick tube of the body. Alapini vinas tended to have narrower tubes. 12th century C.E.

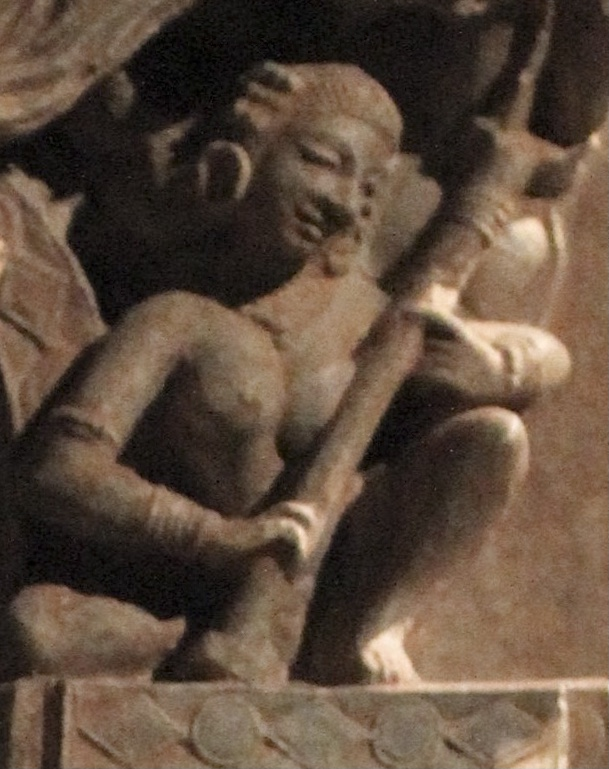
Eka-tantri vina, from sculpture "Guardians of the eight directions"

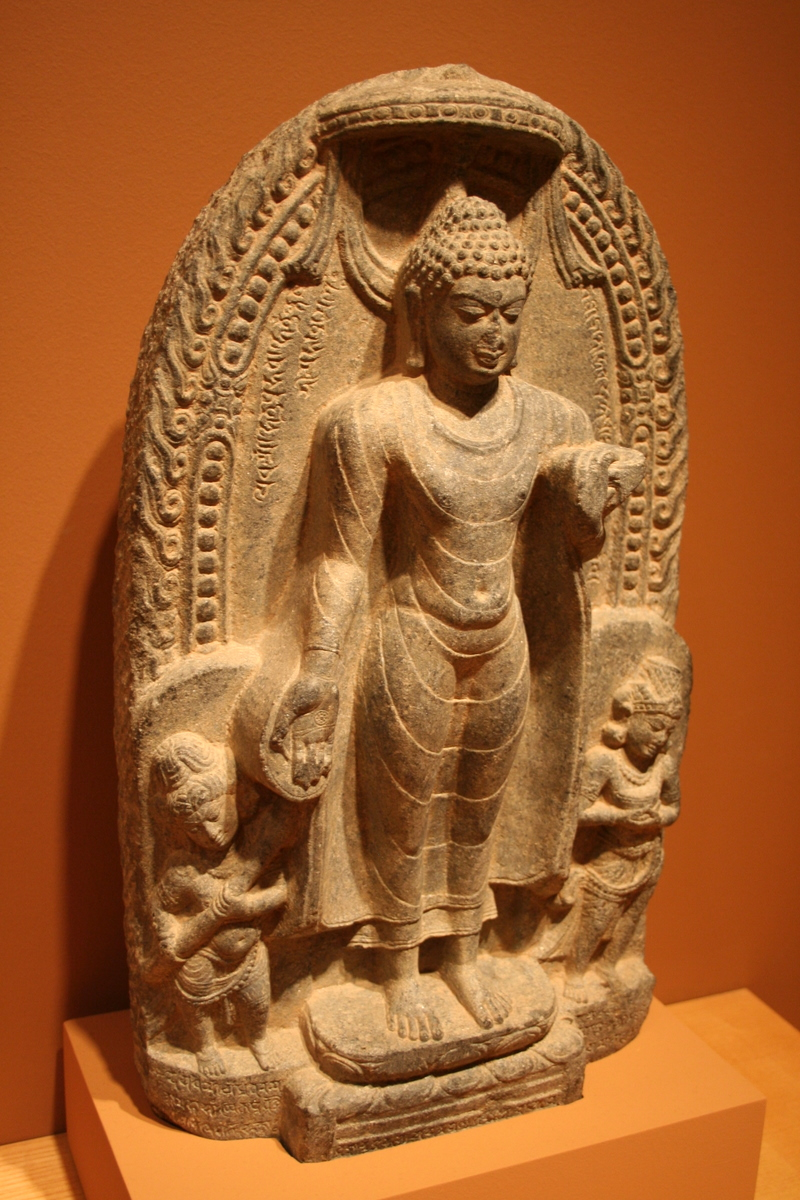
A Buddhist artwork with a person playing eka-tantri vina (far left).

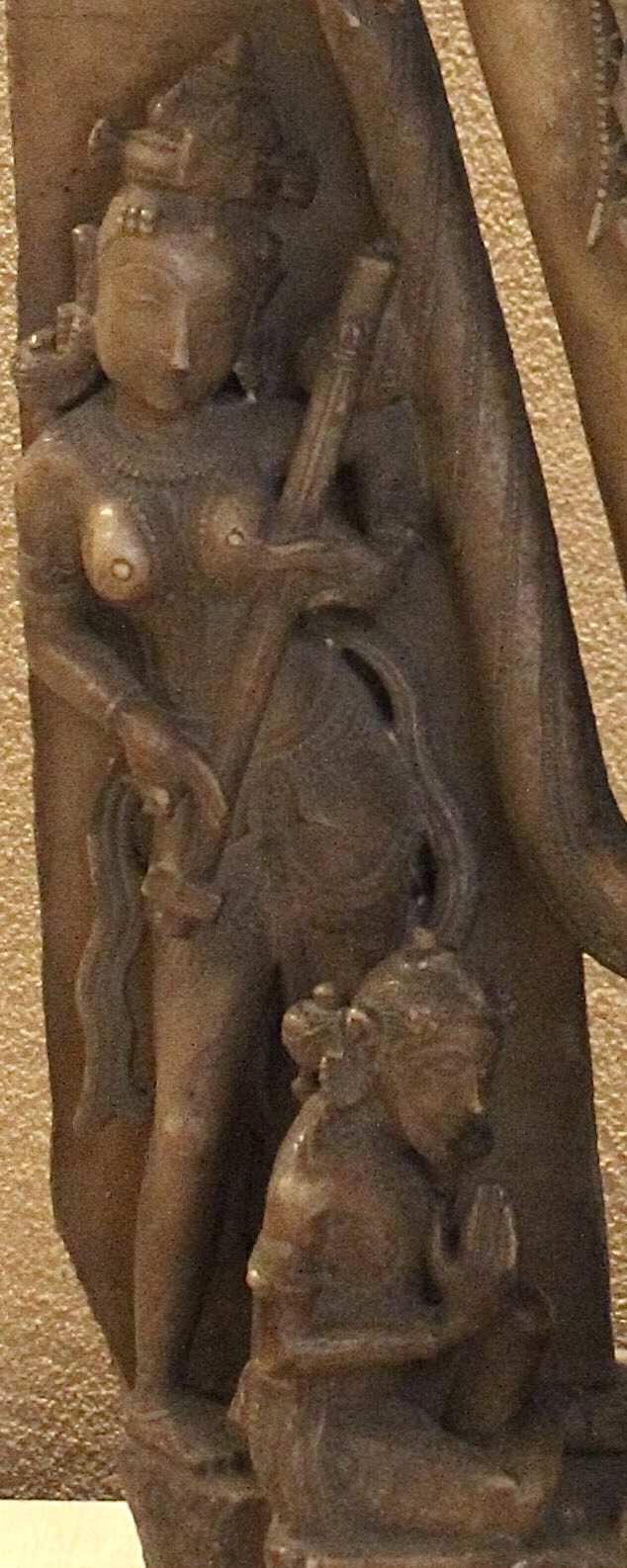
Eka-tantri vina, from the feet (left side) of the Stone Made Parvati from Rajasthan, displayed at National Museum, New Delhi

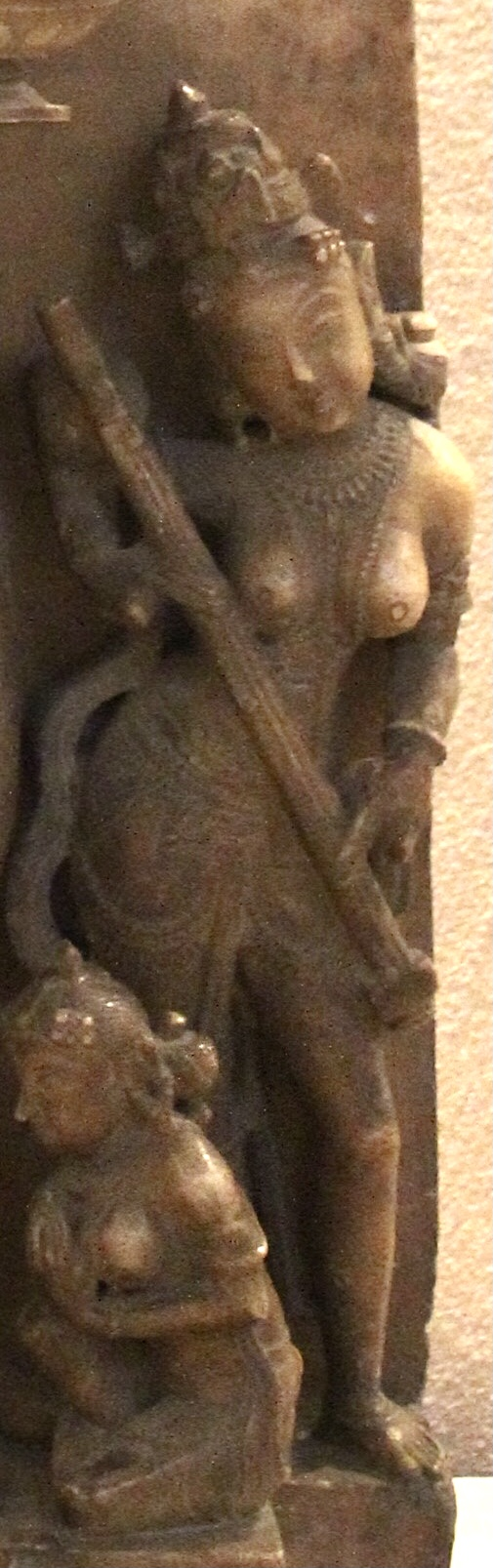
Eka-tantri vina, from the feet (right side) of the Stone Made Parvati, from Rajasthan, displayed at National Museum, New Delhi

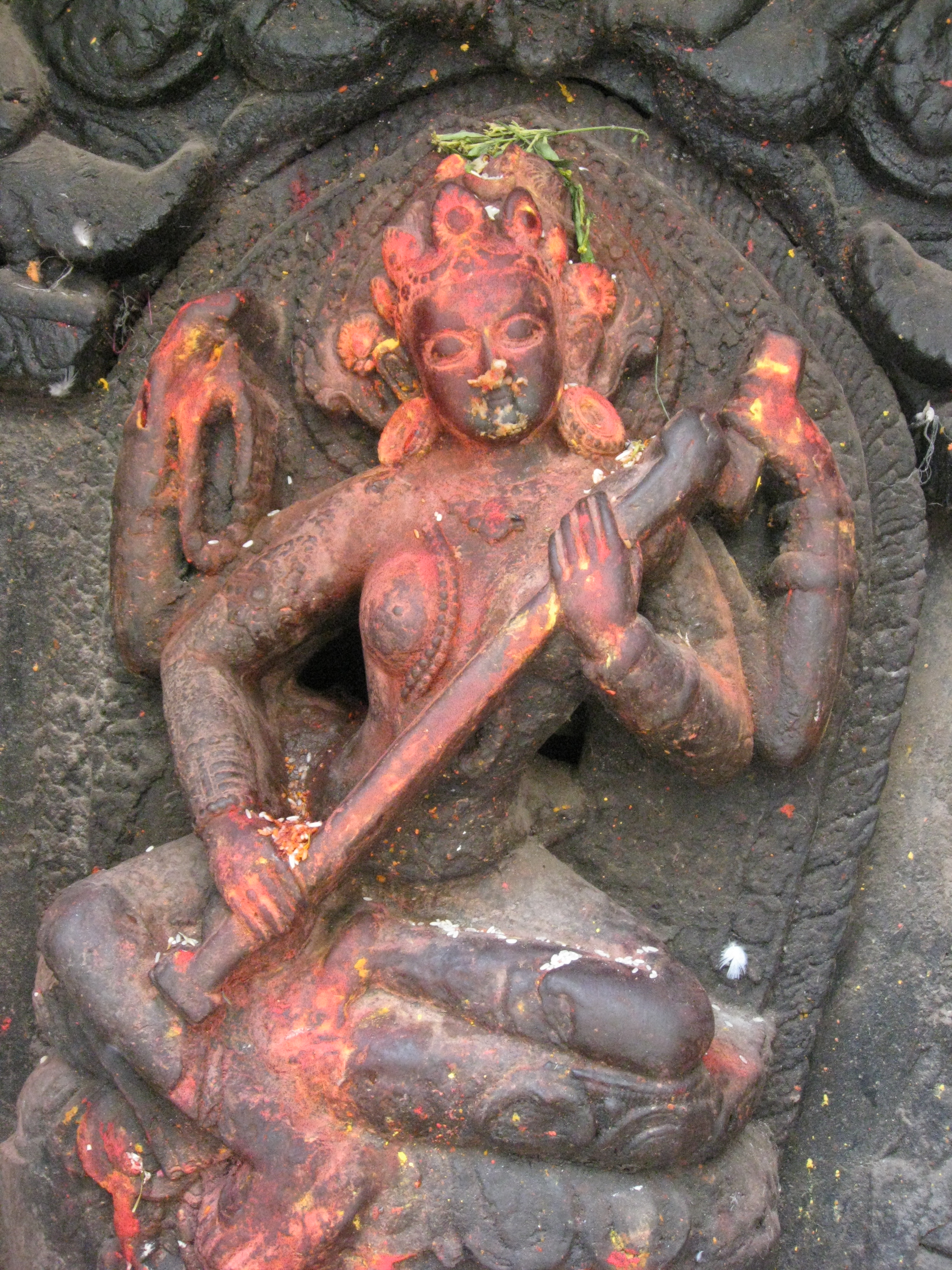
Date unknown. Saraswati playing an eka-tantri vina in Kathmandu, Nepal. The resonator depicted is not a gourd but carved (possibly wood].

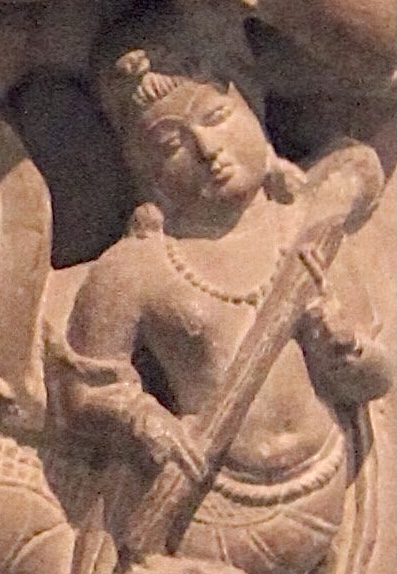
Musician with body of snake playing eka-tantri vina, from Parsvanatha

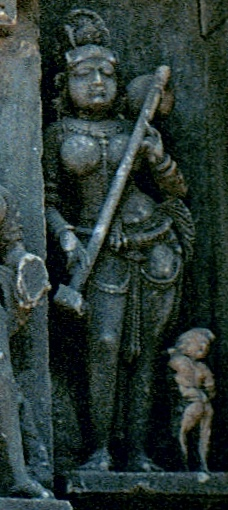
Woman playing Eka-tantri vina at Ambika Mata Temple.

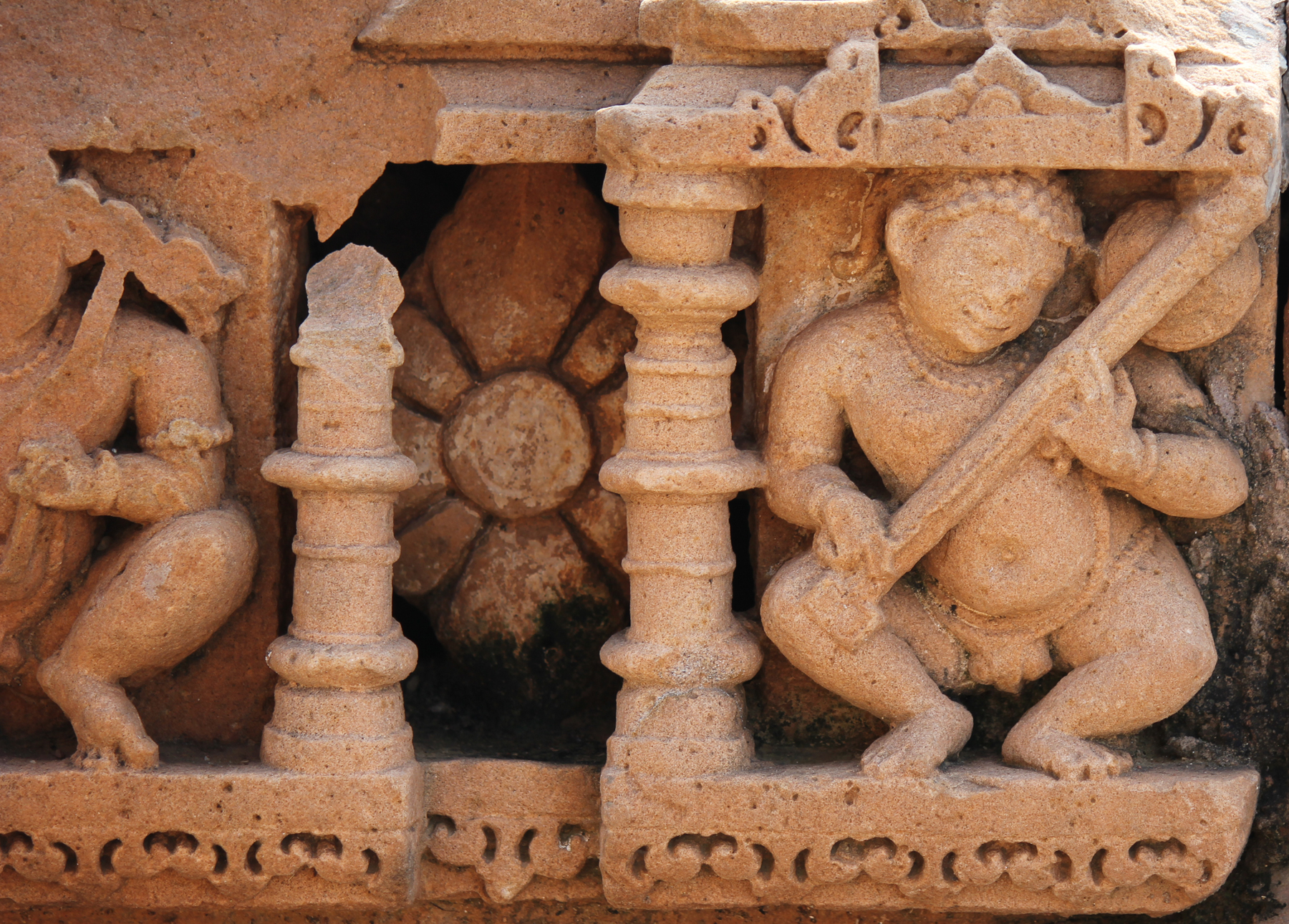
Image from the Harshnath Temple

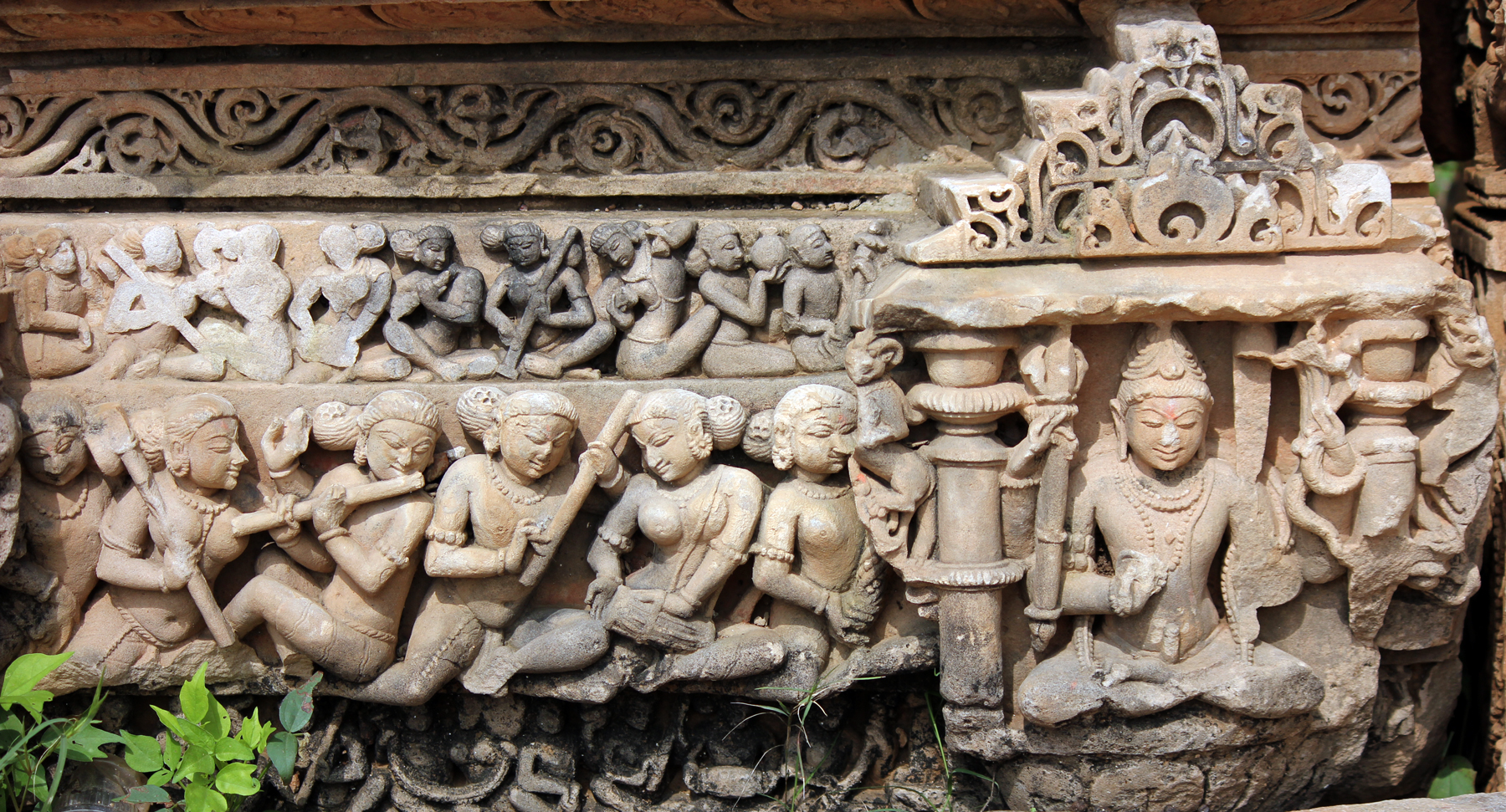
Image from the Harshnath Temple with side view of the eka-tantri vina's resonator

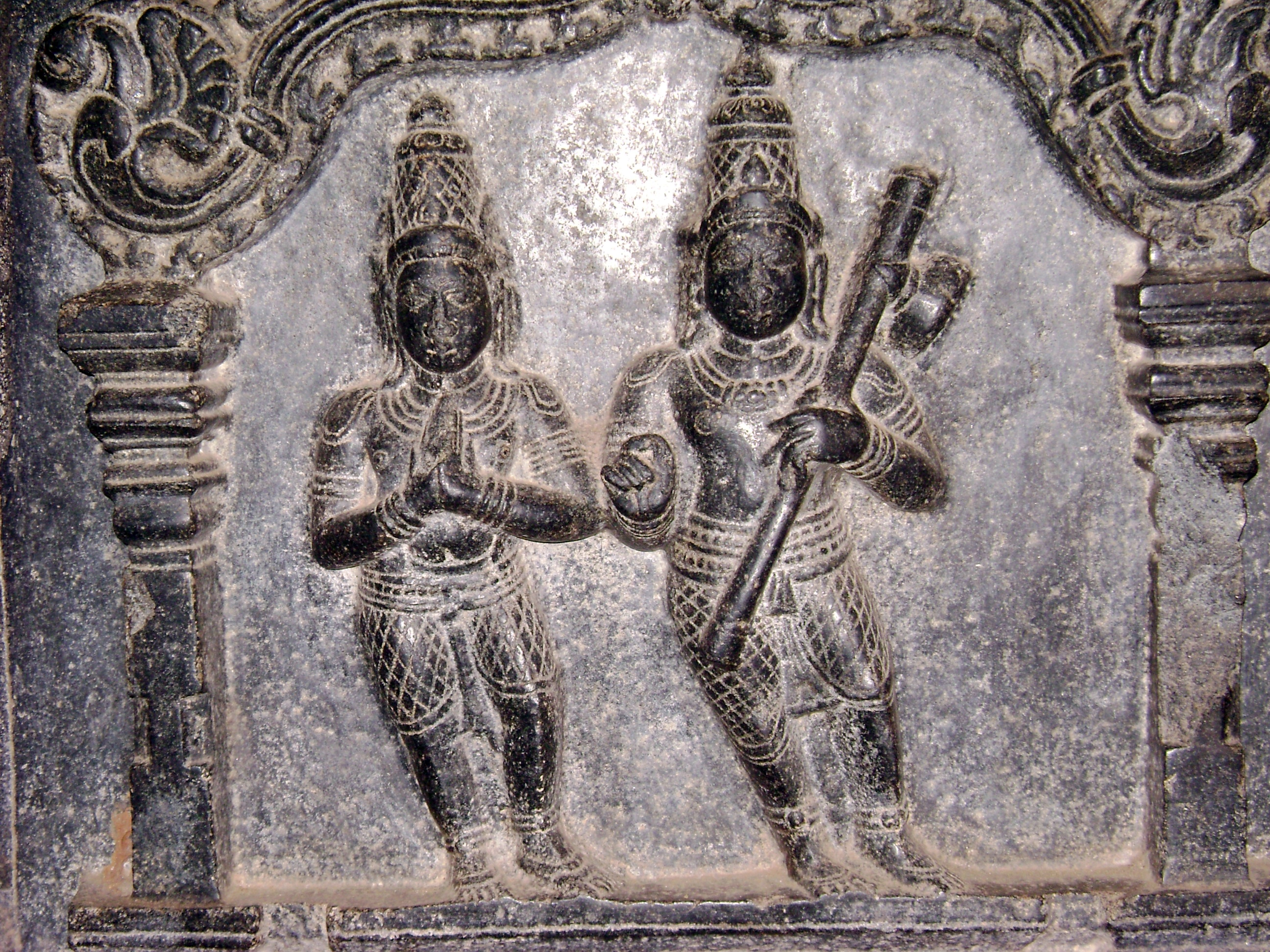
Side view of an eka-tantri vina at the Hazara Rama temple at Hampi. Circa early 15th century C.E.
