= Ragini Trivedi =

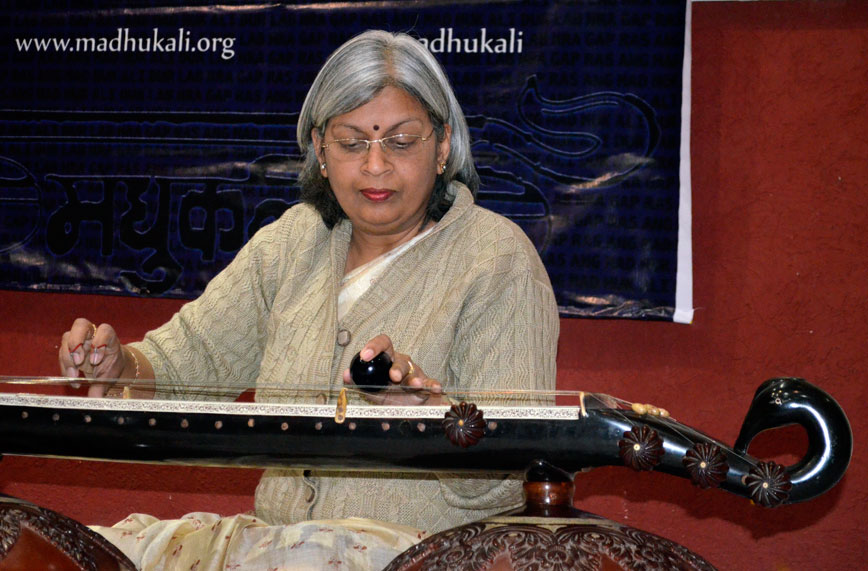
- Ragini Trivedi in 2012

Background information
- Born: Ragini Misra; 22 March 1960 (age 66); Kanpur, Uttar Pradesh, India
- Genres: Indian classical music
- Occupations: Academic, musician, writer, composer
- Instruments: Vichitra veena, sitar, jal tarang

Ragini Trivedi (born 22 March 1960) is an Indian classical musician performing on vichitra veena, sitar and jal tarang. Daughter of the vichitra veena player and musicologist Lalmani Misra, she is an exponent of Misrabani and is the creator of a digital music notation system called Ome Swarlipi.

== Personal life ==
Ragini was born in Kanpur, India. Her father Lalmani Misra and mother Padma instilled understanding and love for music in Ragini and brother Gopal Shankar.

The music lessons explaining nuances of Raga-s, recorded for Gopal Shankar and Ragini by father Lalmani Misra, still serve as resource for learners of Indian music. A versatile student, Ragini participated in sports and loved playing basketball and table-tennis; she was interested in dramatics and extension activities. Her natural excellence influenced her teachers to guide her towards playing musical instruments. Her music teacher, Shobha Parvatkar encouraged Ragini to play Jaltarang.

Ragini lost her mother on 9 April 1977, and father on 17 July 1979. She and her brother Gopal, drew strength from their inheritance of music practice and scholarship. Ragini continued her pursuit of music, getting gold medal in M.Mus. (1980) from Banaras Hindu University and completing D. Mus. under her guide, K. C. Gangrade in 1983. For some time she taught at Banaras Hindu University and later taught Sitar in government colleges at Hoshangabad, Rewa and Indore.

== Musician ==
Of the three instruments, Jal tarang recital was first to be broadcast. First on-stage sitar recital was at Suprabha, an event organised under the mentorship of Kishan Maharaj. Vichitra Veena was first presented at Bharat Bhawan, Bhopal.

As exponent of Misrabani, Ragini has worked towards understanding and practice of technique and style involving a new form of Gatkari (rhythmic stroke patterns) in Vilambit Jhoomara Tal, Vilambit Jhap Tal and Madhya-laya Ada Char Tal. In this new style, Dr. Misra had introduced Mizrab Bol DA RDA -R DA. Especially, in Vilambit pace, the oblique rhythm patterns – Da Rda -R Da— manifest a new dimension of Raga. Enabled by three decades of practice, Ragini creates and plays complex Misrabani compositions on all three instruments in Audav, Shadav and Sampoorna Raga-s. Ragini has designed and conducted various workshops on teaching this style at Jaipur, Pune and Bhopal.

Ragini developed a new notation system, Ome Swarlipi, based on amalgamation of Bhatkhande and Paluskar notation systems. It incorporates several features suitable for digital adaptation and features symbols to annotate complex Misrabani compositions. She also developed digital tools to illustrate inter-relationship of notes, shruti-s, Bharat Chatuh Sarana to serve as a teaching-aid.

Ragini writes on theory, practice and innovation in music. She has collaborated in the creation of compendium and anthologies, in the capacity of contributor and editor. She has worked with subsequent editions of her father's seminal book on Indian musical instruments Bharatiya Sangeet Vadya adding a chapter on electronic Indian musical instruments created since the 1970s. A volume elaborating over 150 Misrabani compositions in 14 Raga-s, that Ragini has prepared from the notes written by her father, is under publication.

== Publications ==
- Raga Vibodh: Misrabani. Hindi Madhyam Karyanvaya Nideshalaya: Delhi. 2010.
- Sitar Compositions in Ome Swarlipi. ISBN 978-0557705962. 2011
- Raga Vibodh: Misrabani Vol. 2. Hindi Madhyam Karyanvaya Nideshalaya: Delhi. 2013.

Ragini's discussions with musicians, Moinuddin Khan, Rajshekhar Mansur, Sharada Velankar, Pushpraj Koshthi and Kamala Shankar, on individual practice and traditional style, have been presented as documentary films by Educational Multimedia Research Center, Indore.

== Sources ==
1. Kaur, Gurupreet. Bhāratīya Saṅgīta ke Anamola Maṇi: Lalmani Misra. Kanishka Publishers & Distributors: New Delhi, 2004.
2. Jal Tarang Guru Guru Shishya Parampara Scheme, South Central Zone Cultural Center, Nagpur
3. Jal Tarang: The Tinkle that Enchants Interview based article on Dr. Ragini Trivedi and Jal Tarang.
4. Report on Sitar workshop
5. Book Release: Commitment to Hindi and Knowledge
6. Raga-Rupanjali. Ratna Publications: Varanasi. 2007. A collection of Compositions of Sangeetendu Dr. Lalmani Misra by Dr. Pushpa Basu.
7. Sharma, S.D. "Women maestros"
8. Brahaspati, Saubhagyvardhan in “4th Brahaspati Sangeet Samaroh at Chandigarh”
9. The Great Master of Hindustani Classical Music: Dr (Baba) Allauddin Khan (1881–1972). Dr Sarita McKenzie-McHarg.Pothi.com: Bangalore.2015
10. Sangeet Pravah Chirantan.Pathak, Santosh. Ed. NavjeevanPublication:Jaipur.2017
