= Brahm Sarup Singh =

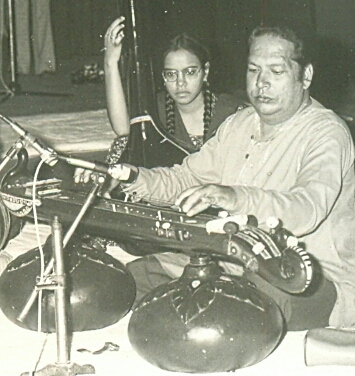
- Brahm Sarup Singh playing vichitra veena

Background information
- Born: 18 August 1940
- Died: 19 January 1998 (aged 57)
- Genres: Indian classical music
- Instrument: Vichitra veena

Brahm Sarup Singh (18 August 1940 – 19 January 1998) was a player of vichitra veena born in the city of Amritsar, India to the Late Shri Harnam Singh who was a disciple of Ustad Abdul Aziz Khan.

At an early age Brahm Sarup Singh was trained by his father in music. He had participated in several music conferences in the North and his Vichitra Veena recital has been broadcasting from All India Radio, Jalandhar since 1958.

== Early life and career ==
Brahm Sarup Singh started his training in vocal music, then moving to sitar and further to Vichitra Veena. He was also a vocalist and played several other musical instruments such as sitar, guitar and tabla.

He did Sangeet Bhaskar (M. Mus) in sitar, Sangeet Praveen (M. Mus) in vichitra veena, Sangeet Visharad (B. Mus) in vocal classical, and Sangeet Prabhakar (B. Mus) in vichitra veena. In the year 1970, Brahm joined the Pracheen Kala Kendra, Chandigarh as a Head of the Department of instrumental music. Later, in 1984 he joined All India Radio (AIR), New Delhi, broadcasting his Vichitra Veena recital.

He participated in several national programmes and music conferences organized by All India Radio and Doordarshan. He was honoured with "Abhinandan Patra" by Navrang Kala Sangam, Patiala. Gayaki Ang was the main feature of his vichitra veena recital.

== Disciples ==
Amongst his disciples in India, Anurag Singh (son and disciple) Vichitra Veena Player, Pt. Keshav Talegaonker (Guitar), Jasbir Kaur (Vocal), Tilak Diwakar Bhatt (Vocal), Monita Mehta (Sitar), Balwant Kaur (Sitar), Ram Krishan (Guitar), Neeru Bala (Vocal), Meena Aggarwal (Sitar), Raj Rani (Vocal), Kuldeep Singh (Tabla), Dr. Abha Bhatnagar (Tabla), Umesh Sharma (Vocal).

== Awards ==
- He was honoured with the title of "Abhinandan Patra" by the Navrang Kala Sangam, Patiala.
