= Vichitra veena =

Plucked string instrument

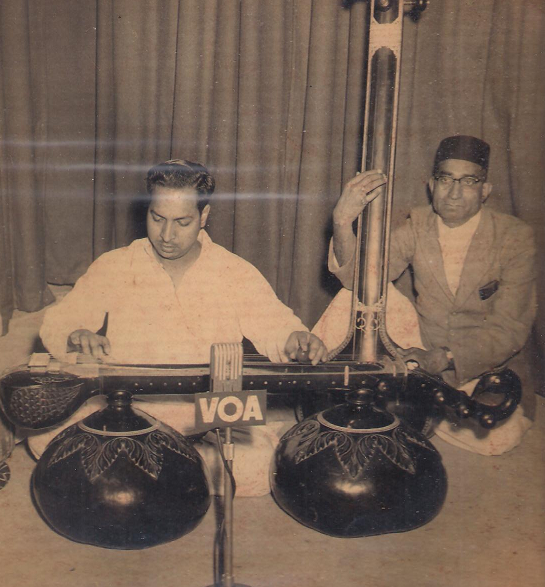
Gopal Krishan on vichitra veena

The vichitra veena (Sanskrit: विचित्र वीणा) is a stick zither, a plucked string instrument used in Hindustani music. Similar to the Carnatic gottuvadhyam (chitra vina) it has no frets and is played with a slide.

== The structure ==
The Vichitra Veena is the modern form of ancient Ekatantri Veena. It is made of a broad, fretless, horizontal arm or crossbar (dand) around three feet long and six inches wide, with two large resonating gourds (tumba), which are inlaid with ivory and attached underneath at either end. The narrow ends of the instrument are fashioned into peacock heads.

== The strings ==
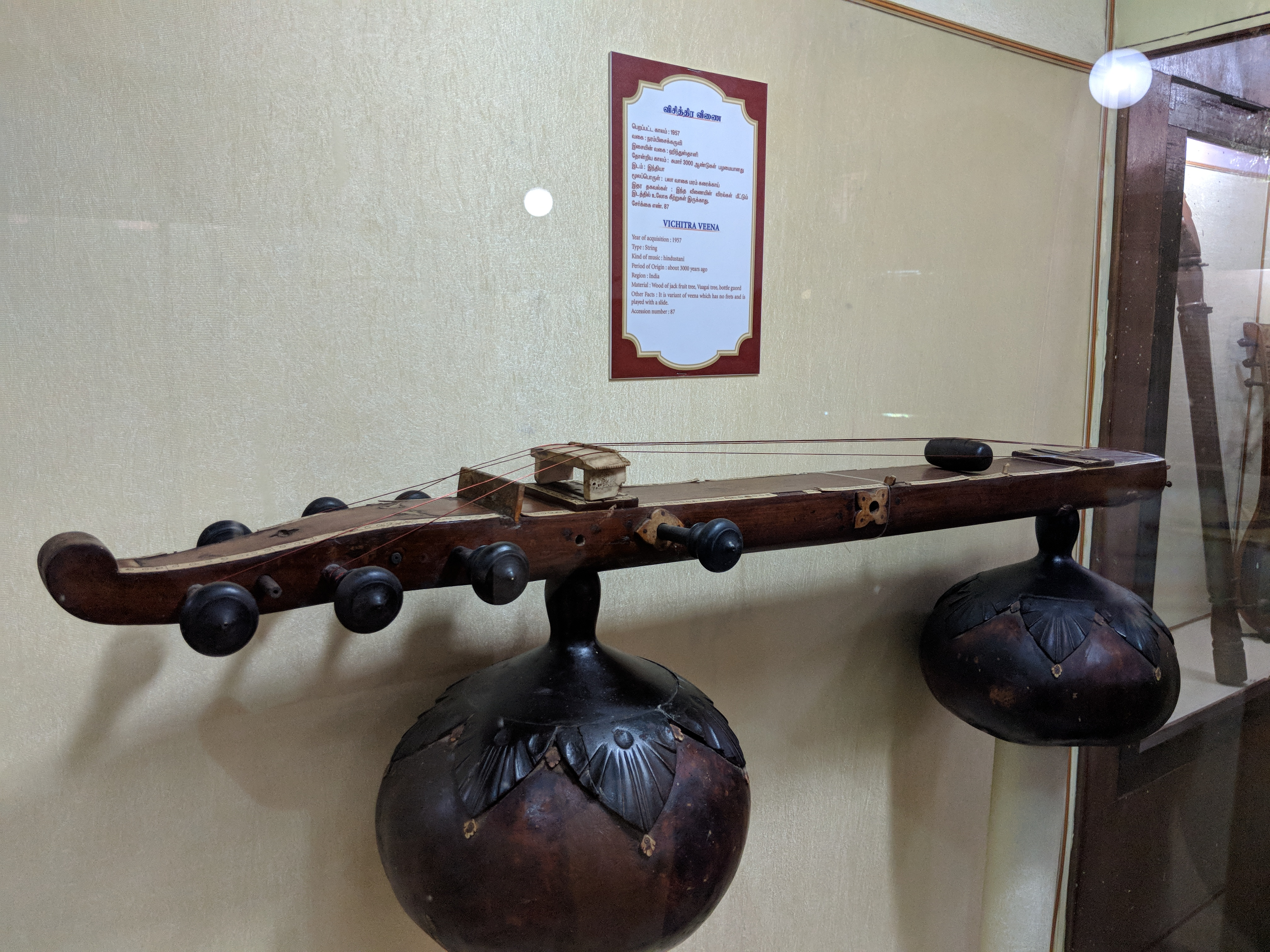
Vichitra veena, mid 20th century. From the exhibition titled "Iyal Isai Museum", January 2018 at the Government Museum, Egmore, Chennai (Madras), Tamil Nadu.

There are four main playing strings and five secondary strings (chikaris), which are played openly with the little finger for a drone effect. Underneath them are 13 sympathetic strings tuned to the notes of the appropriate raag. The veena has a five-octave range. Two plectrums (mizrab) identical to those used for sitar are worn on the middle and index fingers of the right hand to pluck the strings, and a glass ball (batta) is moved with the left across the main strings to create melody (there can be a distance of up to two inches between notes). Coconut oil is put on the strings to minimize the friction of the sliding hand holding the batta.

The veena was often used to accompany the Dhrupad style of singing and this did not allow for much intricacy or embellishment around the notes. It was rescued from oblivion by Lalmani Misra who developed technique of playing and created Misrabani compositions; his son Gopal Shankar Misra made the repertoire universal.

== Artists ==
- Gopal Krishan, (1926 - 2004) disciple of Nand Kishore Sharma. A deep understanding of the raga and a depth presentation by weaving of various intricate musical patterns and its rhythmic synchronisation is his speciality. He specialised in a technique called "Jhala" (very difficult to play on this instrument), which gives a climactic effect to the performance for the grand finale.
- Lalmani Misra, (1924 - 1979) A perfectionist, he modified the instrument for better quality of renditions of Khayals and Thumris. He even played Dadras on the Veena. He created numerous Ragas, Madhukali being the most famous. He was inspired by Ustad Abdul Aziz Khan.
- Gopal Shankar Misra, (1957 - 1999) Son and student of Lalmani Mishra.
- Ragini Trivedi (b. 1960)
- Brahm Sarup Singh, (1940 - 1998) was a renowned player of vichitra veena. In his early age Brahm Sarup Singh was trained by his father Shri Harnam Singh in music. He had participated in several music conferences in the North and his Vichitra Veena recital has been broadcasting from All India Radio, Jalandhar since 1958.
- Anurag Singh (b. 1966) is a renowned player of vichitra veena. He was born in the city of Amritsar, India to the Late Shri Brahm Sarup Singh. He has given numerous public concerts at Hissar, Kurukshetra, Yamunanagar, Ambala, Gujarat, Panchkula, Gurgaon, Kolkata, Lucknow, Jamshedpur and Patna.
- Radhika Veena Sadhika, known as world's first woman vichitra veena player.
- Pandit Shiv Dayal Batish of Patiala
- Keshav Batish, grandson of Pandit Shiv Dayal Batish. See link below.
