= Madhukali =

- Time of day: Evening

Madhukali is a Hindustani classical raga.

== Theory ==
=== Arohana and Avarohana ===
Arohana: Sa komalGa teevraMa Pa Ni Sa

Avarohana: S2 Ni komal Dha Pa, teevra Ma Pa komal Dha komal Ni komal Dha Pa, teevraMa komal Ga Re Sa

=== Vadi and Samavadi ===
Sa Sonant

Pa Consonant

=== Pakad or Chalan ===
This Raga is Pentatonic while ascending and Heptatonic in descending.

=== Organization & Relationships ===
Madhukali is a Raga created by Dr. Lalmani Misra, who played Vichitra Veena, on basis of classical principles of consonance (The Raga Guide: A Survey of 74 Hindustani Ragas, 1999). It blends Madhuvanti, Multani and Ramkali (Raga Rupanjali, 2007 p. 304).

Thaat: It belongs to the category of Raga-s that can be classified under any thaat.

== Behavior ==
This Raga makes use of all seven notes. However, while ascending, the second and the sixth notes are skipped. It comprises third and sixth flat with sharp fourth. The seventh note is both, natural and flat. A special use of this seventh is indicative of Ramkali.

=== Samay (Time) ===
Evening.

=== Seasonality ===
Madhukali has no seasonal associations.

=== Rasa ===
Karun (Pathos)

== Historical Information ==
Created in late sixties.
