= Yoeun Mek =

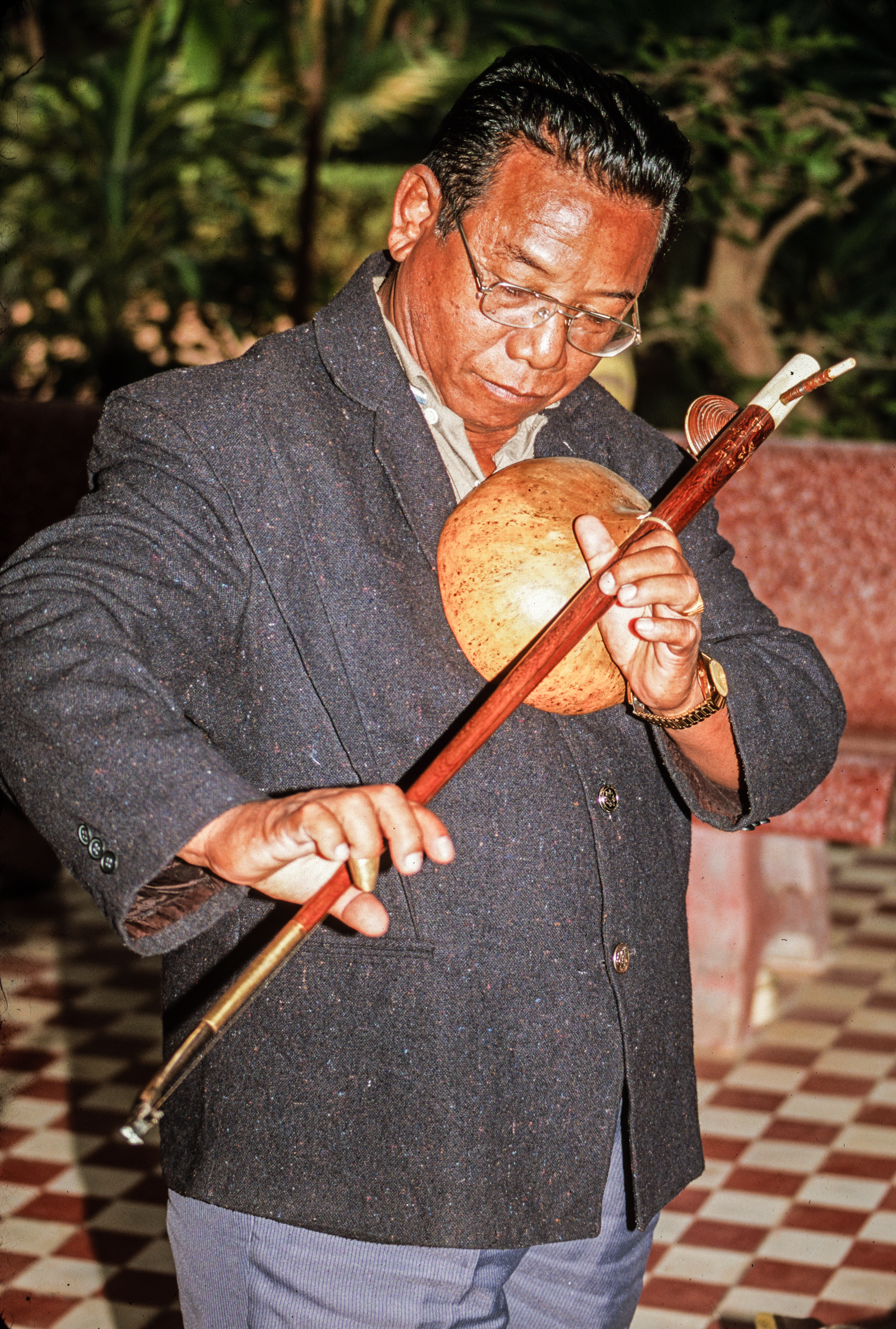
Wat Bo, Siem Reap, Cambodia. November 2001. Khmer Master Musician Yoeun Mek tries to play the one-stringed kse diev instrument for the first time. Mek met Sok Duch, who was the only surviving master of that instrument, teaching at Wat Bo in 2001.

Yoeun Mek (1939 - 2014) was a Cambodian musician who joined the Cambodian Master Performers Program (now Cambodian Living Arts) in 1999, an organization founded by his friend Arn Chorn-Pond to preserve Cambodian music, arts and rituals and keep traditional instruments from going extinct. The program, in its quest to preserve Khmer music, sought out Cambodia's "nearly extinct instruments and the people who can make and play them." 80-90% of the musicians of the country were "purged" by the Khmer Rouge from 1975 to 1979. Out of the people who could play the traditional instruments to a high level, the Cambodian Master Performers Program estimated that only 100 to 200 musicians had survived the executions, which targeted almost everyone with an education, those who understood a foreign language, and many artists (including musicians, writers, and filmmakers).

Yoeun, who had made his first tro sor when he was 15, was a "master" of the tro family of instruments, especially the tro sau thom and tro u. He also knew enough about the khim, takhay, drums and chheng to include them in his teaching traditional wedding songs.

In 1975, when the Khmer Rouge took over the capitol at Phnom Penh, he would have been about 36. His friend Arn would have been 9-years old that year. Both Yoeun and Arn were in the same Khmer Rouge work camp together; working in the fields by day, and playing music for the soldiers in the evening. His friend may have saved his life by begging the soldiers to let Yoeun play with the small group that entertained them. Rather than play traditional Cambodian music, Yoeun was permitted to play revolutionary music with communist themes: "the dances depict hardworking people, farmers working together, people digging canals and people laboring in the sun to fix railroad and so on." Separately from the soldiers, Yoeun taught his friend traditional music that was forbidden by their government.

After the fall of the Khmer Rouge in 1979, Yoeun worked for his country's new government, in the State Department of Art and Culture until he retired. He set up a barbershop and was found by his friend Arn, who hired him to teach his instrument at the Cambodian Master Performers Program.
