= Radhika Veena Sadhika =

Indian vichitra veena artist

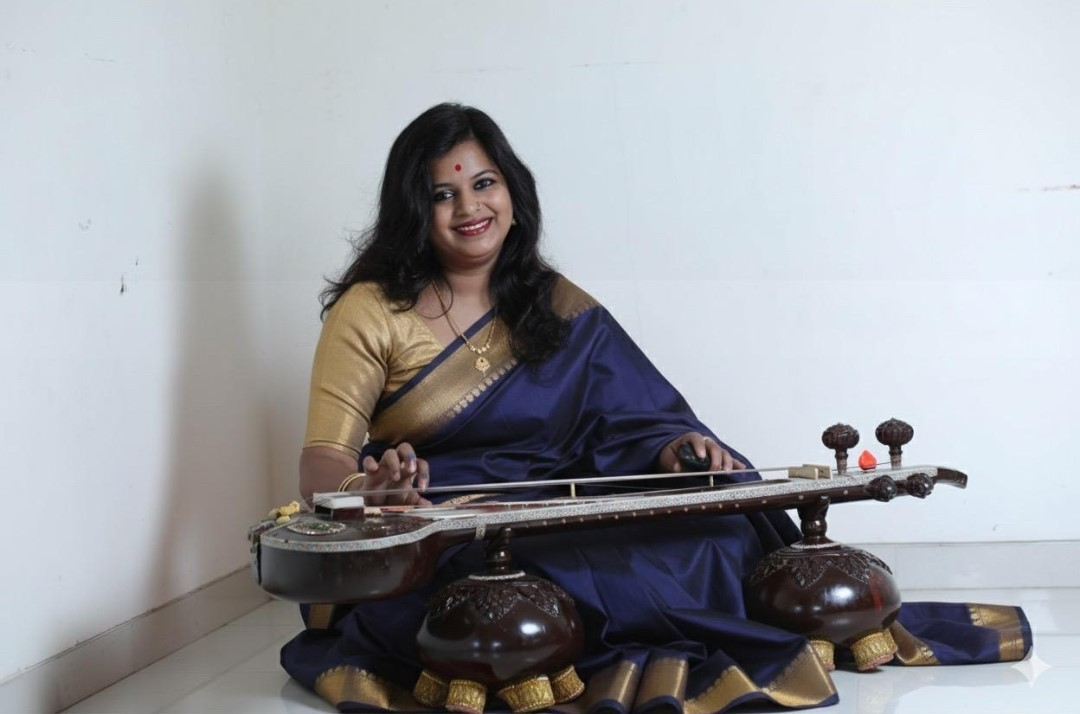
- Born: Radhika Umdekar Budhkar; 1982 (age 43–44); Gwalior, Madhya Pradesh, India
- Occupations: Vichitra Veena and Sitar Player
- Parent(s): Shriram Umdekar and Smruti Umdekar
- Musical career
- Genres: Indian classical music
- Instrument: Vichitra veena
- Website: www.veenavenuartfoundation.com

Radhika Umdekar Budhkar also known as Radhika Veena Sadhika is a vichitra veena player and veena teacher from Madhya Pradesh, India. She is the world's first woman vichitra veena player.

== Biography ==
Sadhika comes from a family of musicians who migrated to Gwalior in Madhya Pradesh several generations ago. Her grandfather Balabhau Umdekar was a trained vocalist in Gwalior Gharana. He was also the court musician of Scindias, the rulers of the then princely state of Gwalior. Similarly, her father Shriram Umdekar who is a sitar and rudra veena player, used to play and teach sitar, surbahar and rudra veena. Radhika started learning music from her father. Her first vocal performance was as a child. She first studied classical vocal and sitar. By the time she was 12, she began to be known as a sitar player, earning a double MA and several gold medals. After much research, she and her father got to know about the Vichitra Veena and she began to play the instrument. Because of the size and weight of the Veena many did not learn how to play the instrument. Later, she trained under mohan veena maestro Vishwa Mohan Bhatt. Currently she resides in Navi Mumbai, where she runs her Institute Veena Venu Art Foundation.

== Musical career ==
Sadhika started her music education by studying classical vocals and sitar and later started focusing on vichitra veena in her early teens. She is recognized as the world's first woman vichitra veena player. She performed at the Saaz-e-Bahar at NCPA, an annual instrumental music festival organized by the National Center for the Performing Arts (NCPA). She introduced a lighter and improvised version of the instrument. While the traditional vichitra veena is 5 feet long and weighs 5 kg, Radhika's version is only 48 inches long and weighs 2 kg.

Sadhika has won several fellowships and scholarships and has performed at many music festivals in India. Besides performances, she also teach veena at the Veena Venu Art Foundation at Navi Mumbai.
