= Anurag Singh (musician) =

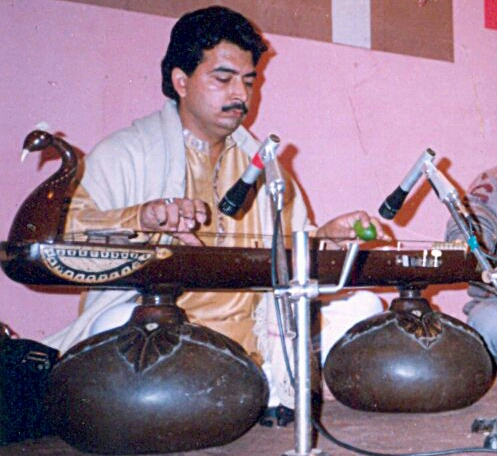
- Anurag Singh playing vichitra veena

Background information
- Born: 2 September 1966
- Genres: Indian classical music
- Occupation: Vichitra Veena Player
- Instrument: Vichitra veena
- Years active: 1977–present

Anurag Singh (born 2 September 1966) is a player of vichitra veena. He has received various awards, scholarships and junior fellowship in vichitra veena. He was born in the city of Amritsar, India to the Late Shri Brahm Sarup Singh. Anurag Singh belongs to the family of musicians. He has received many awards and scholarships, including a junior fellowship in vichitra veena.

== Early life and career ==
Anurag Singh was trained in Vocal Classical music by his father. He later received training in sitar and further in vichitra veena. He did Sangeet Bhaskar (M.Mus.) in Vocal Classical Music, Sangeet Visharad (B.Mus.) in Vichitra Veena, Sangeet Visharad (B.Mus.) in Sitar, Sangeet Bhushan (Senior Diploma) in Guitar and Sangeet Prabhakar (B.Mus.) in Tabla. He was honored by Delhi Sanskrit Academy Award on 9 August 2014, for composing Sanskrit Shlokas and Qawwali.

He has been working as a Music Teacher in DAV public school, Delhi Since 1989.

== Awards ==
- He was honoured with National Award in Vichitra Veena Recital in the year 1997.
- He was honoured with National Award in Vichitra Veena Recital in the year 2002.
- He was honoured with National Award in Vichitra Veena Recital in the year 2004.
- He was honoured with National Award in Vichitra Veena Recital in the year 2006.
