= Gopal Shankar Misra =

Gopal Shankar Mishra (13 August 1957 – 1999) was an Indian musician and music teacher, who played the vichitra veena.

== Early career ==
Mishra was invited to join the 1998 UK touring and Real World recording project made by State of Bengal and Ananda Shankar, Uday Shankar's son.

== Growing up ==
Gopal was born in Kanpur, India in 1957. His sister, Ragini, was born some years later. His mother was called Padma. Surrounded by and growing up with a naturally musical culture, his interest deepened following an international tour with his father. He had studied vocal music and sitar since the age of four and was interested in cricket and other sports.

At the age of 15 his interest in music turned serious. His father introduced him to the industry in 1975 at Varanasi. Chhotelal Mishra, disciple of Pandit Anokhelal Mishra accompanied Gopal who performed a rendering of Marwa, with Chandrakauns and Pahadi on the sitar.

== Sources ==
1. Jacket note by Alan James, Out of Stillness Real World Compact Disc, April 2000
