= Kinnari veena =

Musical instrument

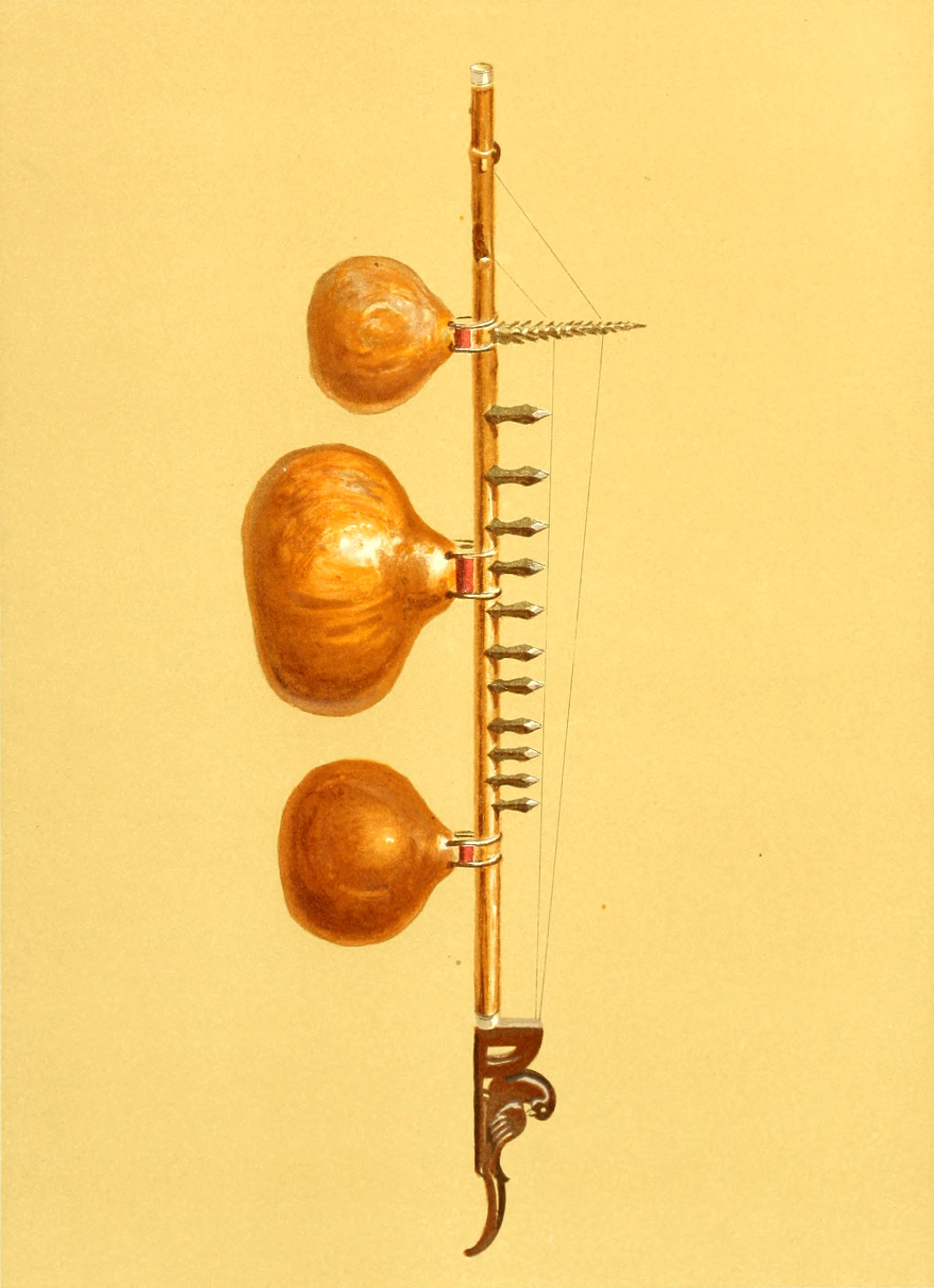
Kinnari Vina, late 19th century. The bird is supposed to represent a kite. The instrument's body was a hollowed out stick, forming a tube.

The kinnari vina (Sanskrit: किन्नरी वीणा) is a historical veena, a tube zither with gourds attached to act as resonators and frets. It was played in India into the late 19th century and was documented by two European artists. The instrument dates back into medieval times (documented in the 13th century) and possibly as far back as 500 C.E. It is closely related to the Alapini Vina and Eka-tantri Vina, the instruments having coexisted in medieval times.

Along with the alapini vina and eka-tantri vina, the kinnari vina was mentioned by Śārṅgadeva in his Sangita Ratnakara (written 1210 - 1247 C.E.) By the late 19th century, the kinnari vina survived as a "folk instrument," in South Kanara and Mysore, India, and in the modern bīn or rudra vina.

The instrument shares its name with the kinnara, Buddhist and Hindu mythological creatures that are pictured playing stick zithers or tube zithers. The kinnari vina is traditionally carved with a bird emblem on one end.

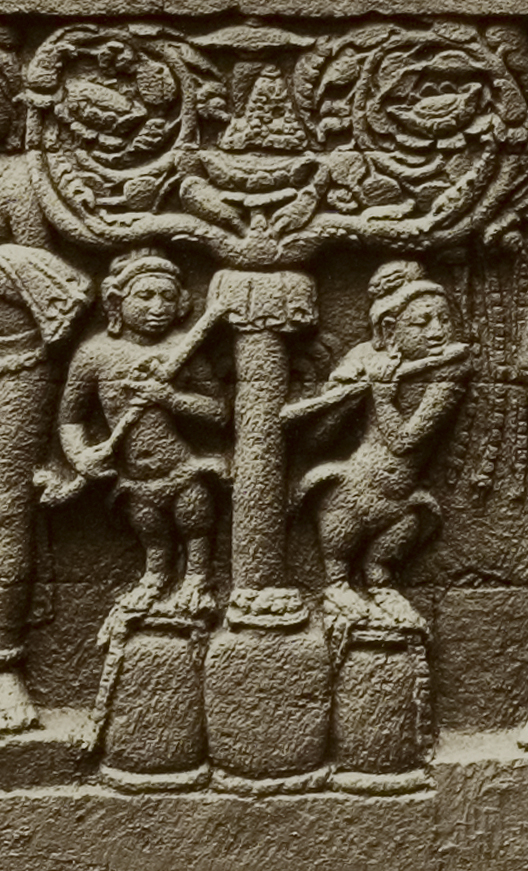
9th century C.E. Stick zither and flute played by kinnaras, from the relief of the hidden base of Borobudur - 1890-1891. The kinnara is pressing the gourd resonator into his chest. The end of the stick zither resembles a bird.

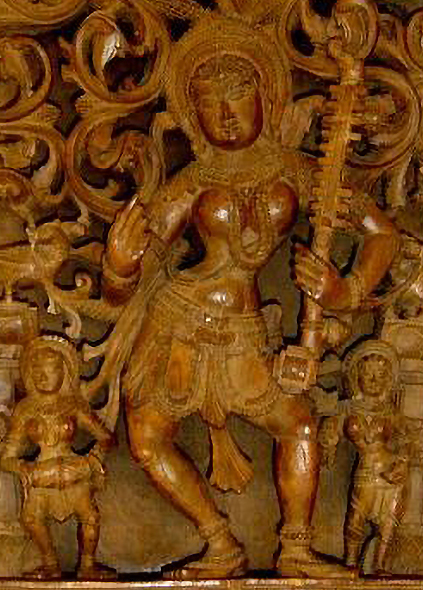
Sarasvati with a fretted kinnari vina, with an apparent makara or yali on the top. Fretted tube-zither vinas are mentioned in literature by 800 C.E., coexisting with the non-fretted vinas. The rudra veena descends from the kinnari veena.

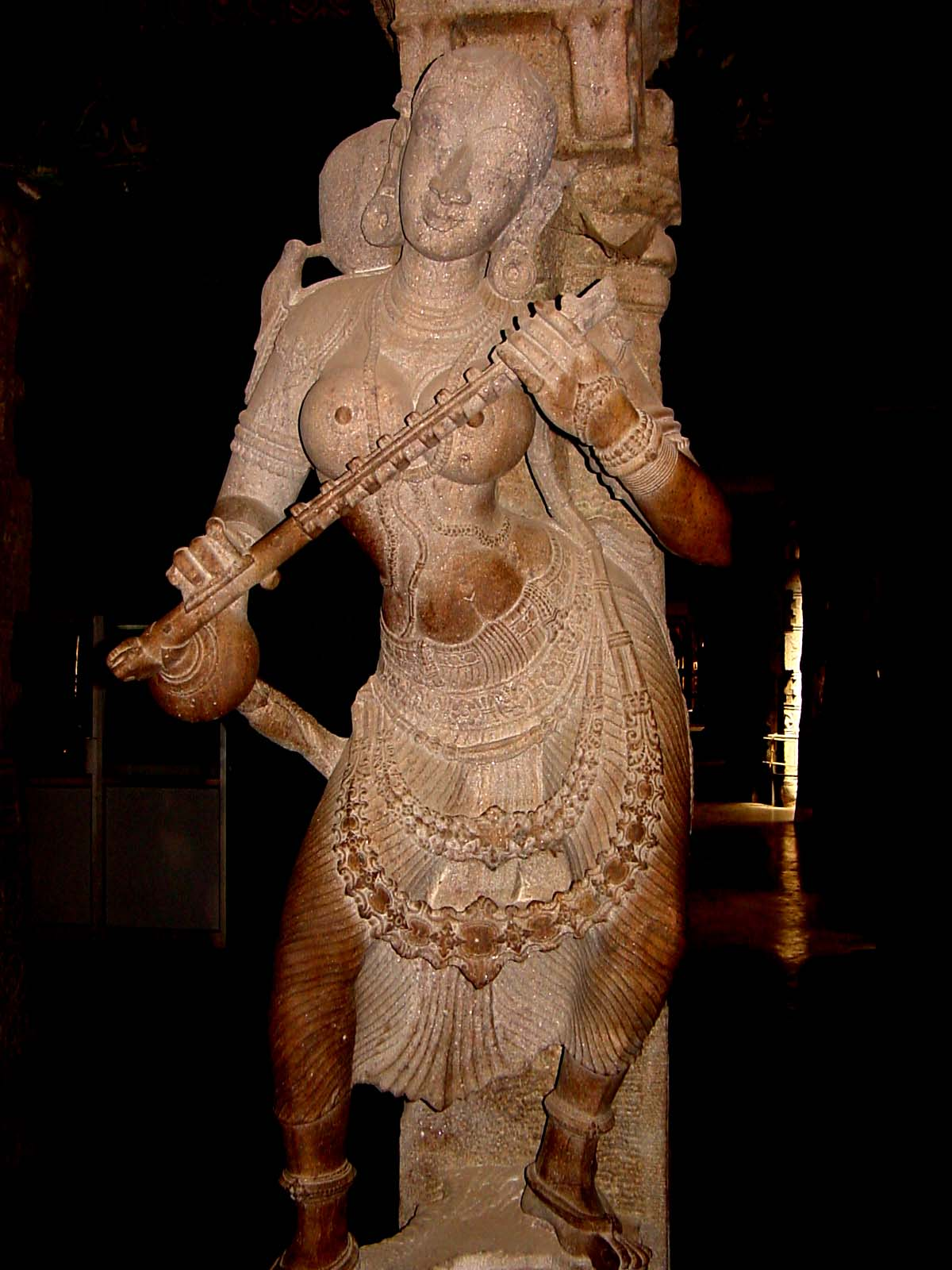
Statue of a musician playing a kinnari vina at the Airakkal Mandapa (Thousand Pillar Hall) in the Meenakshi Temple, Madurai.

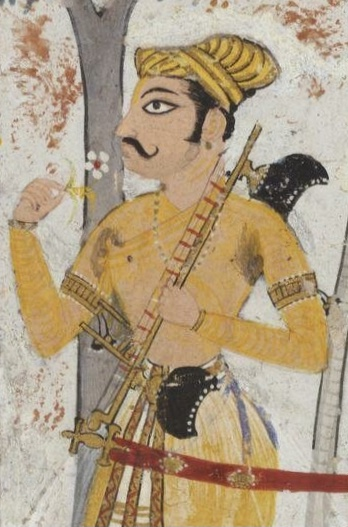
Mewar, ca. 1630-1640 C.E. A kinnari vina played by a prince

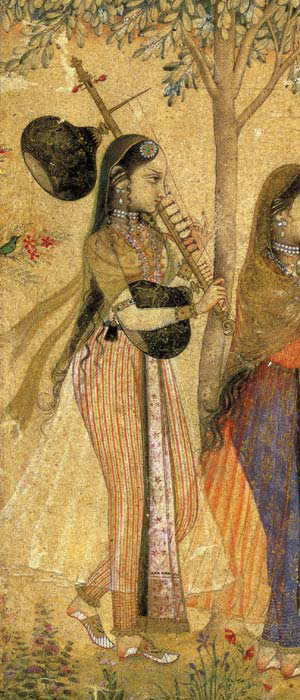
Woman playing kinnari vina, from painting by Rahim Deccani, late 17th century C.E.

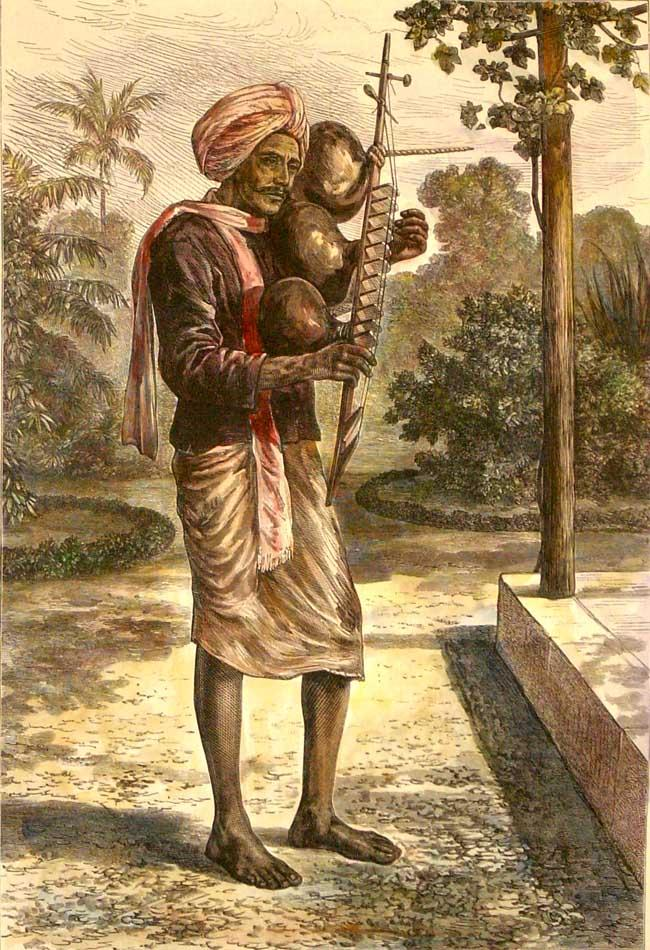
Madras, 1876. Kinnari vina labeled "tingadee." The spike is a bridge, directing string energy to resonator.

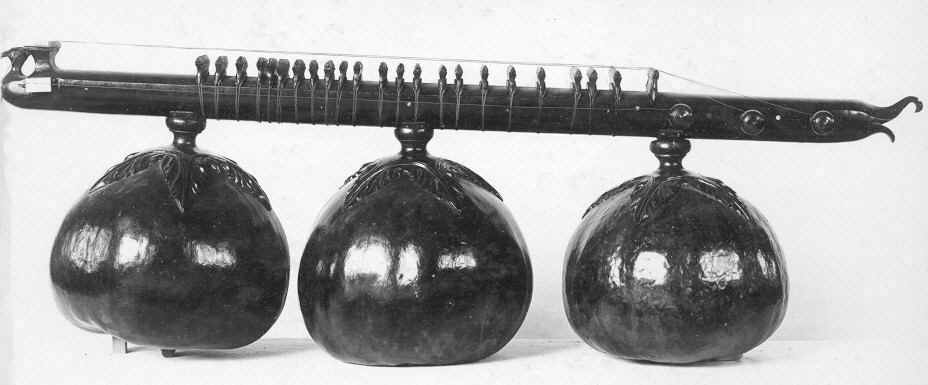
Kinnari vina, 19th century C.E., from the Metropolitan Museum of Art. Instrument has a bird (left) and an animal (right).

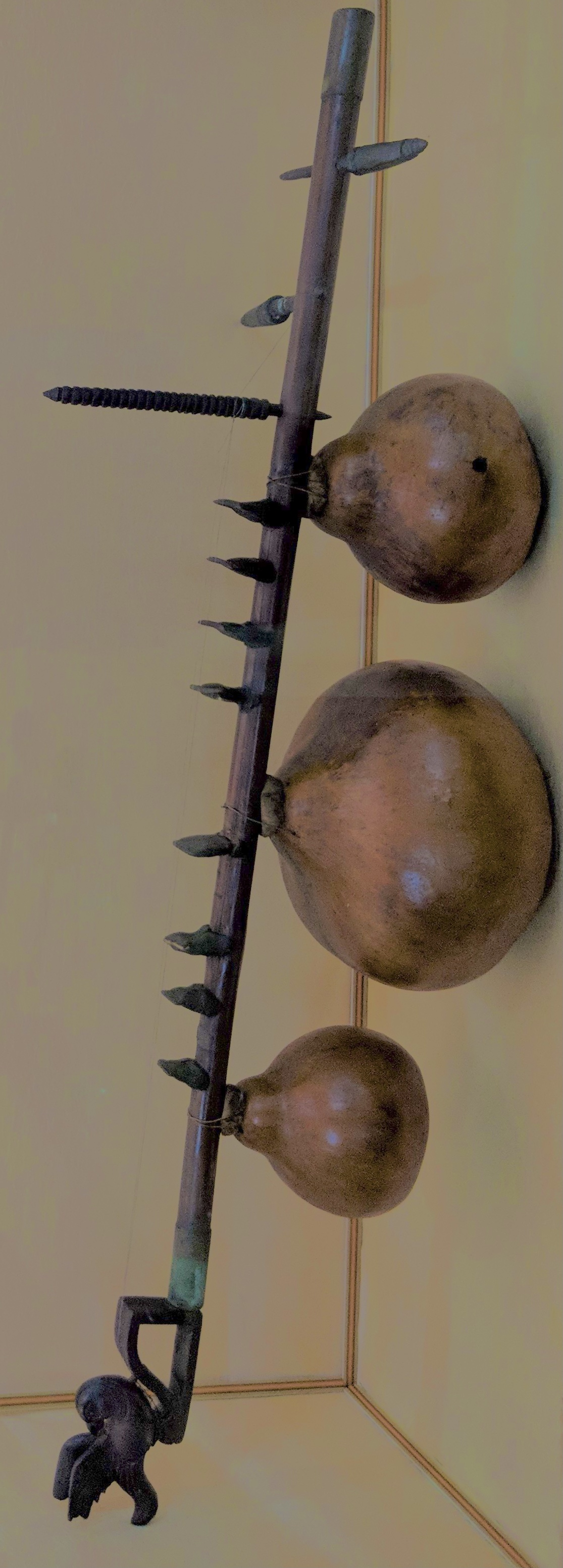
Kinnari vina, 1903.

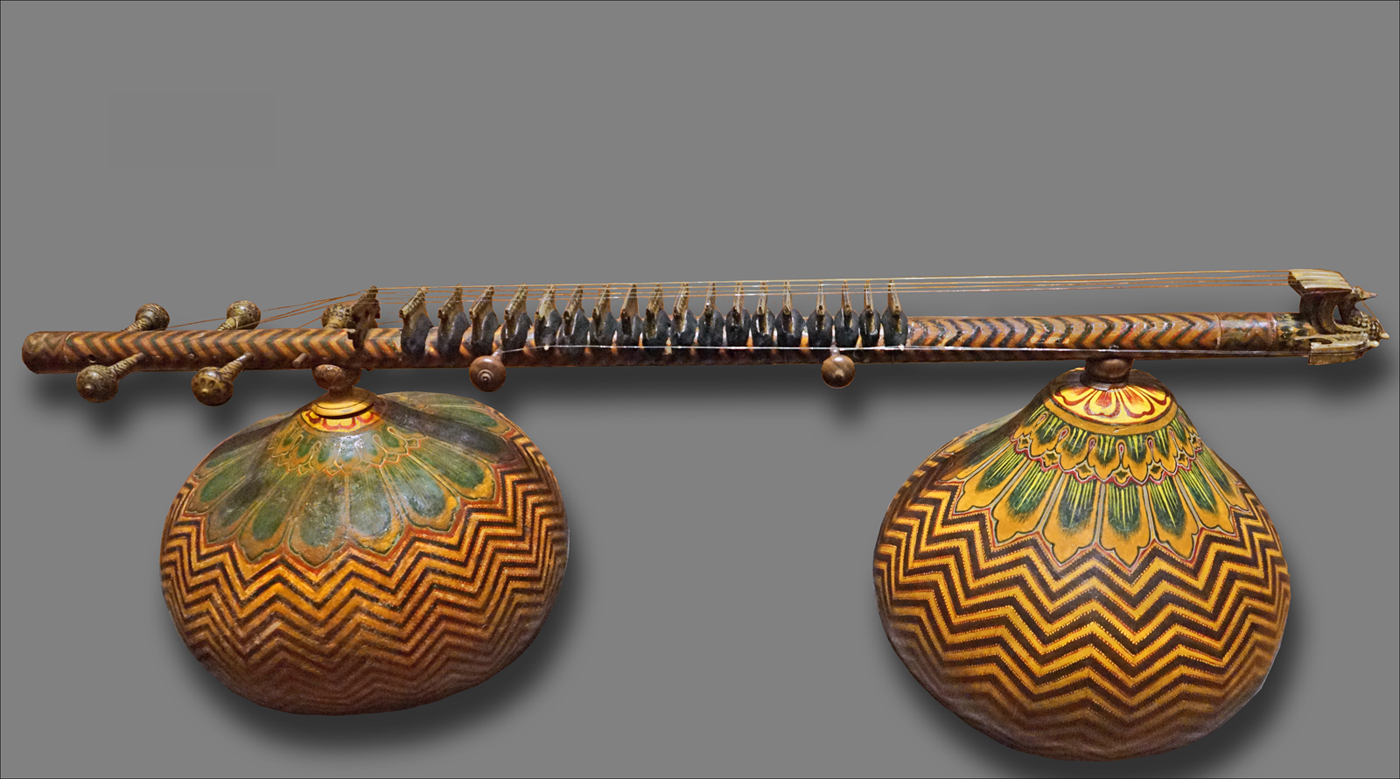
Bīn or rudra veena, Musée de la Musique (Paris). Instrument has a bird (right side).

== Comparison of kinnari, alapini and eka-tantri vinas ==
The center gourd on a three gourd kinnari vina had the bottom cut off, which was pressed into the musician's chest while the instrument was being played. This created a "closed resonance chamber". The instrument shared this feature with the ālāpiṇī vīṇā stick zither and tube zither. The alapini vina had a single gourd, while the eka-tantri vina and kinnari vina might have a second gourd. The kinnari vina often had a third resonance gourd.

As music developed in India to include a 12-tone scale, ca. 700-800, the tube zithers developed frets. Pictures show both long (eka-tantri-style) and short (alapini-style) tube zithers. Some of these may also be called kinnari vinas. In 1400, the frets on the kinnari vina were attributed to Matanga (800 A.D.) the author of Brhad-desi.

In the early Mughal Empire, the kinarri vina had two strings, the bīn had three and the yantra or jantar had 5 or 6.

The instrument in modern times has a notched or carved stick mounted vertically on the tube, similar to the African mvet zither. On that instrument, the stick allows a musician to make quick minor modifications to the string's pitch, raising and lowering the pitch as it is placed higher and lower on the stick. In Indian music, this would help the musician switch quickly between tunings for different songs.

== Medieval kinnari vina ==
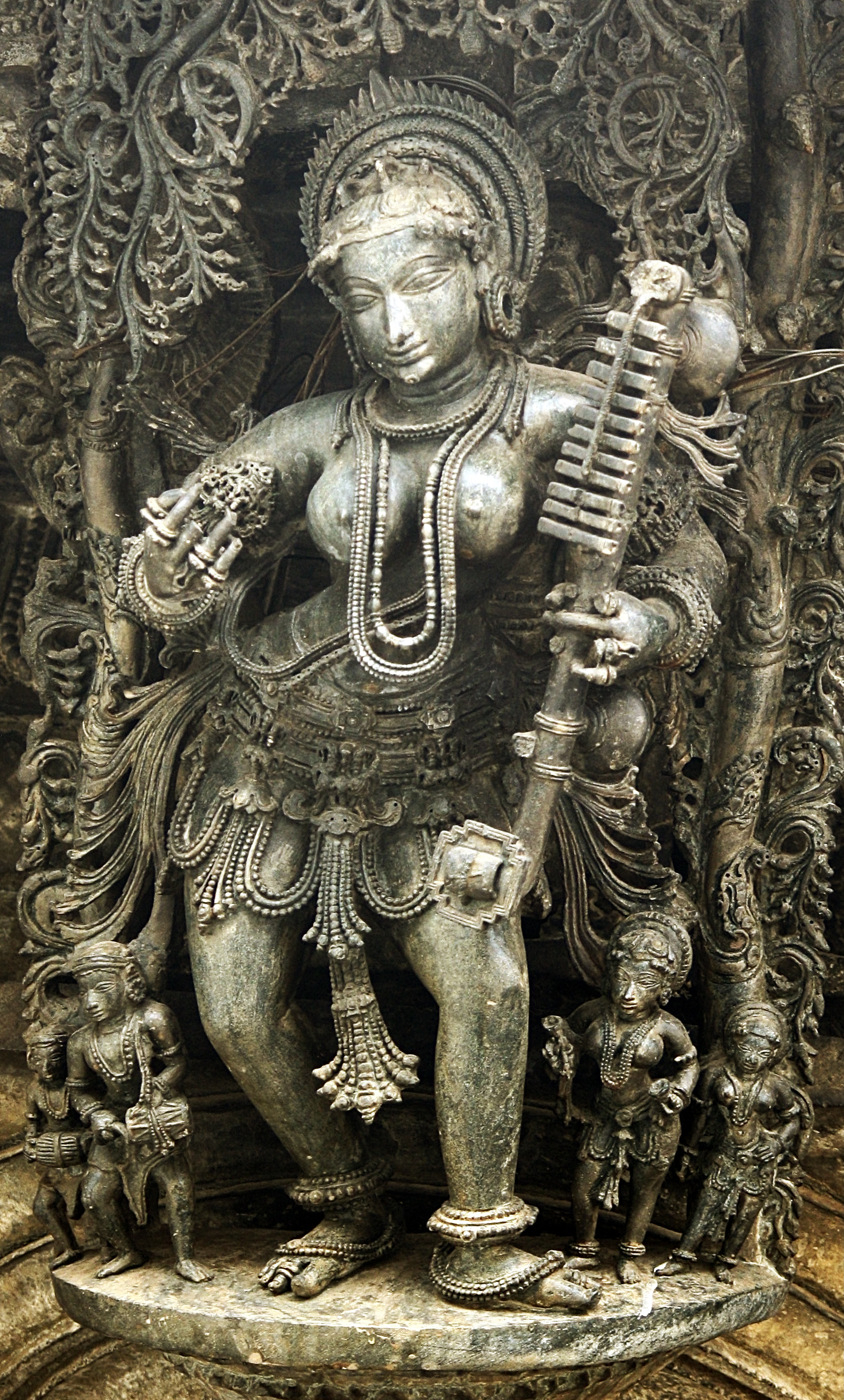
Ca, 12th century C.E. Musician playing Kinnari vina at the Chennakeshava Temple, Belur. The squared circle on the instrument's bottom is a platform for the stringholder and bridge. It connects to the tube, delivering vibrations to tube and gourd resonators.

The kinnari vina was documented by Śārṅgadeva (1175-1247). Versions of the Kinnara vina, according to him, included the Bruhati kinnara, Madhyama kinnara, and Laghvee Kinnara.

The differences were in the length of the dandum (tube), and its thickness. The tubes evidently were not round, as a basic kinnari could be 2.5 inches tall and 5.5 inches wide. The height increased with the addition of frets.

According to Sarngadeva, the bruhati kinnari vina had a dandam 50 inches long, with a width of 6.5 inches. The madhyama kinnara vina had a dandam is 43 inches, with a width "in proportion." The laghvi kinnari vina was 35 inches in length, with a width of 5 inches.

== Ancient Tamil kinnari (kinnaram | கின்னாரம் ) ==
The kinnaram is a version of the kinnari found in Tamil. The Tamil instrument is a one-stringed pierced-lute, made from a calabash or sorakkai gourd. The gourd is pierced with a bamboo rod so that it sticks out on both sides of the calabash and forms a neck. Traditionally, it was strung with fiber from the Saccharum spontaneum plant, but in recent years, metal stings have been used. The instrument may be on the edge of extinction, as a news article has reported that only one experienced player is now living.

== Similar instruments ==
Similar plucked fretted tube zithers, which may derive from thekinnari veena, include the đàn brố or bro of Vietnam's Central Highlands, the jejy vaotavo (also called lokanga voatavo or herrauou) of Madagascar, and the dzendzé ya shitsuva of the Comoros.
