= Śārṅgadeva =

Indian musicologist (1175–1247)

Śārṅgadeva (1175–1247), also spelled Sharngadeva or Sarnga Deva, was a 13th-century Indian musicologist who authored Sangita Ratnakara – a Sanskrit text on music and drama. It is considered to be the authoritative treatise on Indian classical music by both the Hindustani and Carnatic music traditions.

Śārṅgadeva was born in a Brahmin family of Kashmir. In an era of Islamic invasion of the northwest regions of the Indian subcontinent and the start of Delhi Sultanate, his family migrated south and settled in the Hindu kingdom in the Deccan region ruled by the Yadava dynasty near Ellora Caves (Maharashtra). Śārṅgadeva worked as an accountant with freedom to pursue his music interests in the court of King Simhana (r. 1210–1247).

== Ideas ==
Śārṅgadeva presented his ideas on music and dance in seven chapters of Sangita Ratnakara, but integrated it with philosophical context. He systematically presented his ideas on the nature of sound, register, the smallest distinct sounds that humans can hear and musical instruments can produce (shruti), musical scales and modes, 264 ragas, beats and role of time (tala), prosody (chhandas), relation between performance arts and human emotions and sentiments, musical and vocal ornaments, the composition of drama and songs, and the limitless opportunities available to the artist to express and affect her audience.

According to Peter Fletcher – a professor of Music and Drama, Śārṅgadeva states in Sangita Ratnakara that "the composer was expected to be a competent performer, but he also made clear that the composer was expected to know his audience, and how their minds work, rising above his own likes and dislikes, in order to bring delight to everyone". Śārṅgadeva's views on music, states Fletcher, exemplified ideas in the Bhagavad Gita relating to non-attachment.

== Influence ==
Śārṅgadeva is one of the most influential medieval era music theorists of the Indian subcontinent, and his book has been called "the first modern book on Indian classical music". The book is considered by some to be as significant as Bharata's Natya Shastra. According to Don Randel, a professor of musicology, Śārṅgadeva's text is the most comprehensive treatise that interprets the Natya Shastra and Brihaddeshi of the ancient Indian music tradition.

== See also ==
- Purandara Dasa
- Raga
- Tala
- Tansen
