= Phin pia =

Musical instrument

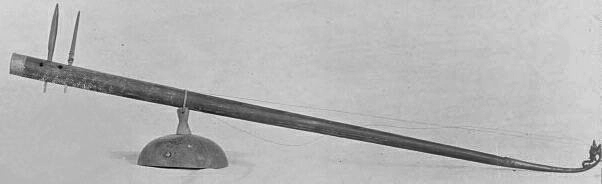
Phin phia, Thailand, 19th century. This is a multiple string phin phia.

The phin pia is a chest-resonated stick zither with two to five strings. It is considered the national instrument of Northern Thailand. Tuning for phin pia: G3, B3, C4 and F4. The one-stringed version (equivalent to the Cambodian kse diev) is called phin namtao.
