= Kse diev =

Cambodian musical bow

Kse diev ខ្សែដៀវ
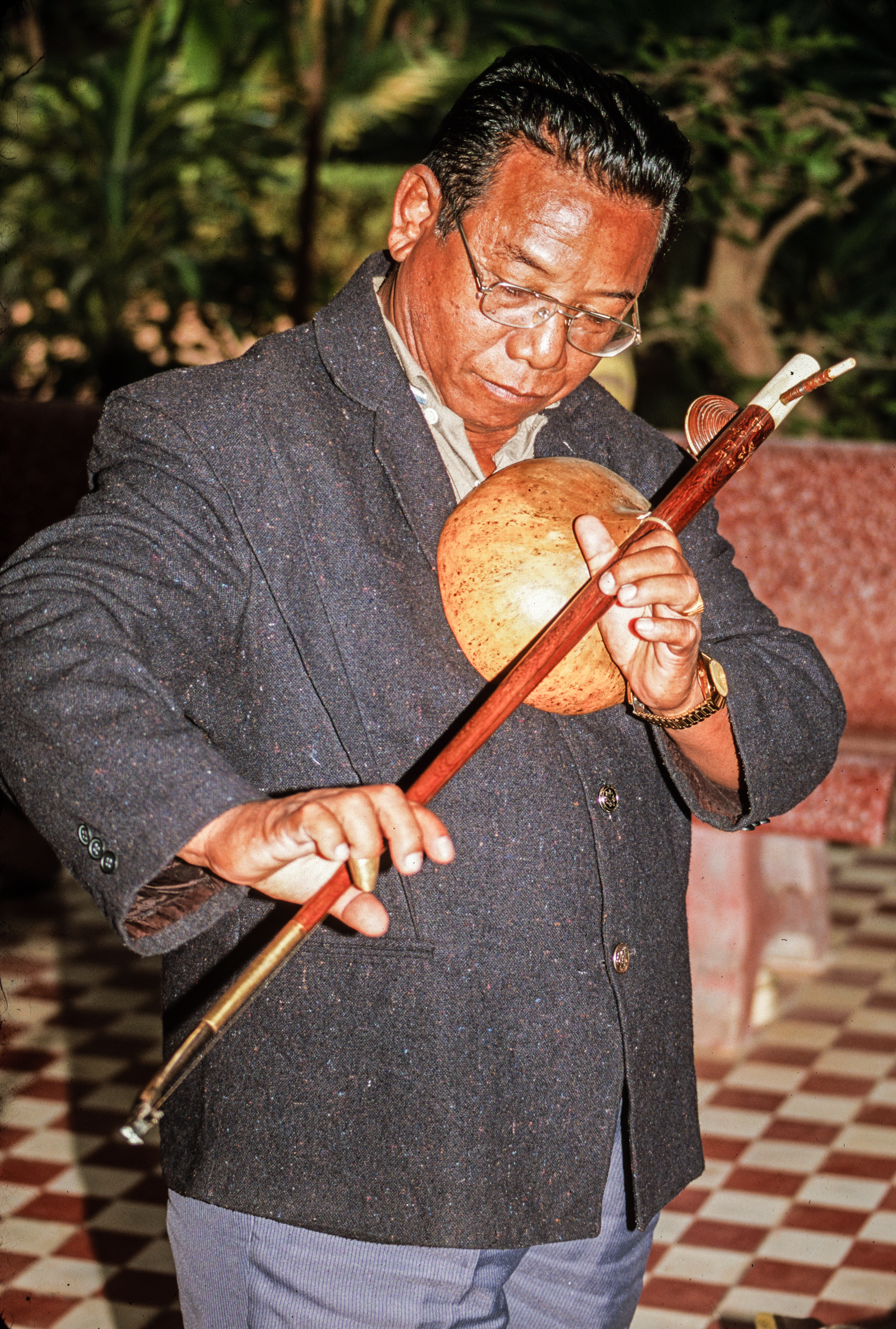
- Khmer musician Yoeun Mek, a master of the tro u fiddle, experiments with a one-stringed kse diev. Mek met kse diev master, Sok Duch, at Wat Bo in 2001.

String instrument
- Other names: ksae diev, say diev, sa diev, khsae muoy, khse muoy
- Classification: String instrument Plucked string instrument
- Hornbostel–Sachs classification: 311.211 ("Musical bow cum stick" (subeset of stick zithers, further subset of bar zithers), musical bow cum stick, with rigid string carrier, curved flexible end, one attached resonator gourd.)

Related instruments
- Phin pia; Phin namtao; Đàn bầu

The kse diev (Khmer: ខ្សែដៀវ) or khse mhoy (Khmer: ខ្សែមួយ) is a Cambodian stick zither with a single copper or brass string and a gourd resonator. The resonator is held to the bow with a nylon cord and is open at the other end. The nylon cord holds on the resonator and acts as a loop around the copper string, bringing it to the stick. The nylon loop acts as the nut on a guitar, the place below which the string vibrates and sound begins.

To play the instrument, the musician holds the open end of the gourd against their chest and plucks the copper string with a "tubular" plectrum of copper or plastic, worn on the fourth finger. The musician controls the pitch of the notes by applying pressure on the string near the gourd with the first finger, moving up and down on the string. Pressure is applied and released to let the note sound; pressure and release are tools the musician can use to bend sound or control the way the sound falls off at the end of a pitch. Harmonics may be adjusted with the left hand by moving it to open and close the seal of the gourd against the player's chest. The tuning is A2 or G2. A twelve-note range is normal. The kse dieve is often a solo instrument, but it may be played as well in the aareak orchestra, the traditional wedding orchestra (plenh kar boran) and the plenh areak ("magic healing orchestra").

When the United Nations helped Cambodia to assess its cultural heritage, the kse diev was considered to be the country's oldest musical instrument. Whether or not it was the oldest, the instrument was played in the Angkor court of the Khmer Empire, and the instrument appeared in a bas-relief carving from the 12 or 13th century at the Bayon temple. According to ethnomusicologist, Patrick Kersalé, "the first iconography [of the kse diev] in Cambodia dates back from the 7th c. in Sambor Prei Kuk."

Very few kse diev players survived the Khmer Rouge in the 1970s and the instrument almost disappeared from Cambodia. The instrument has been saved by the remaining "master of the kse diev", Sok Duch (សុខ ឌុច), teaching others his instrument. Since 1979, Sok Duch and now some of his students have been adding new players to the country's pool of musicians. With a group of players in existence to keep the kse diev from becoming extinct, the instrument and its traditional repertoire face the same big challenges that other traditional instruments face, the competition posed by modern music. Musicians are working now to make the instrument more popular.

The kse muoy is a variant of the instrument, having an extra gourd on the bottom.

Kan Tom Ruy (កន្ទុំរុយ), a Cambodian, playing an amplified kse diev
