= Lalmani Misra =

Indian classical musician (1924–1979)

- Born: August 11, 1924; Kanpur, India
- Died: July 17, 1979 (age 54)
- Genres: Indian classical music
- Instruments: Sitar, vichitra veena

Lalmani Misra (August 11, 1924) was an Indian musician and musicologist known for his contribution to Hindustani classical music. He played instruments such as the sitar and the vichitra veena. Michael Mondezie of Trinidad Express Newspapers noted that Misra worked on the playing techniques of the vichitra veena and on a system of musical notation in Indian classical music.

== Biography ==
Misra received training in Dhrupad and Dhamar under Shankar Bhatt and Munshi Bhrigunath Lal. He studied Khyal singing with Ustad Mehndi Hussain Khan. In addition to these vocal styles, Misra trained in various instruments, studying sitar under Shri Shukdev Roy and tabla under Swami Pramodanand.

At the age of 12, Misra began working as the assistant music director at Shehanshahi Recording Company in Kolkata, where he lived for two years.

Misra returned to Kanpur in 1940, following his father's death. He established music schools for children in Kanpur, called "Bal Sangeet Vidyalaya," and founded the institution "Bharatiya Sangeet Parishad," as well as a music college, "Gandhi Sangeet Mahavidyalaya." He developed syllabi for both formal academic and informal learning environments. Around this time, he also founded an orchestral society.

== Works ==
Dr. Pushpa Basu documented the following ragas in her book:

1. Madhu Bhairava: Hexatonic Raga of Bhairava Ang performed early in the morning.
2. Shyam Bihag: Penta-heptatonic Raga of Kalyan Thaat and Ang, performed late evening.
3. Madhukali: Penta-heptatonic Raga blending Madhuvanti, Multani, and Ramkali, played early in the evening.
4. Sameshwari: Penta-heptatonic Raga blending Rageshri and Kalavati, played early in the evening.
5. Baleshwari: Hexa-hexatonic Raga blending Bageshwari and Bilaskhani Todi, played before noon.
6. Jog Todi: Hexa-heptatonic Raga blending Jog and Todi, played any time due to its light nature.
7. Anand Bhairavai: Revived through research; a type of Bhairavi called Madhyam-Pradhan (subdominant centric), which shuns Rishabh (supertonic).

== General references and external links ==
- Nada Rupa, Sharma, Dr. (Miss) Premlata, Ed. College of Fine Arts, B.H.U., Varanasi: 1961. Special Issue with Supplement, Vol I, No. 1, January 1961.
- Sangeetendu Pandit Lalmani Ji Misra: Ek Pratibhavan Sangeetagya, Tewari, Laxmi Ganesh. Swar Sadhana, California, 1996.
- Shruti Aur Smriti: Mahan Sangeetagya Pandit Lalmani Misra, Chourasiya, Omprakash, Ed. Madhukali Prakashan, Bhopal, August 1999.
- Sangeetendu Acharya Lalmani Misra. Vidushi Premlata Sharma
- Sindura on Vichitra Veena, a short movie clip on Online Music Education
- Celestial Music of Pandit Lalmani Misra. DVD. Santa Rosa, California: Svar Sadhana, 2007.
- Raga-Rupanjali. Ratna Publications: Varanasi. 2007. A collection of Compositions of Sangeetendu Dr. Lalmani Misra by Dr. Pushpa Basu.
- Raga Vibodh: Misrabani. Dr. Ragini Trivedi. Hindi Madhyam Karyanvaya Nideshalaya: Delhi. 2010.
- Sitar Compositions in Ome Swarlipi. Dr. Ragini Trivedi. 2010.
- Links to musical pieces
- Madhukali – Organization in memory of Sangeetendu Dr. Lalmani Misra
