= Veena =

Various chordophone instruments from the Indian subcontinent

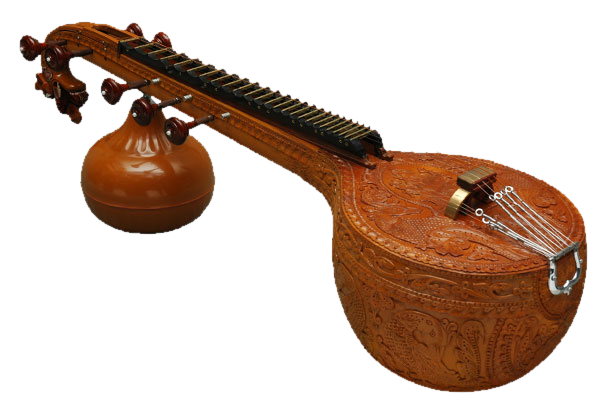
- A Saraswati Veena

String instrument
- Other names: Vina
- Classification: String instruments
- Developed: Veena has applied to stringed instruments in Indian written records since at least 1000 BCE. Instruments using the name have included forms of arched harp and musical bow, lutes, medieval stick zithers and tube zithers, bowed chordophones, fretless lutes, the Rudra bīn and Sarasvati veena.

Related instruments
- Chitra veena, Harp-style veena, Mohan veena, Rudra veena, Saraswati veena, Vichitra veena, Sarod, Sitar, Surbahar, Sursingar, Tambouras, Tambura,

Sound sample
- A veena improvisation (2004) A veena kushree

The veena, also spelled vina (Sanskrit: वीणा IAST: vīṇā), is any of various chordophone instruments from the Indian subcontinent. Ancient musical instruments evolved into many variations, such as lutes, zithers and arched harps. The many regional designs have different names such as the Rudra veena, the Saraswati veena, the Vichitra veena and others.

The North Indian rudra veena, used in Hindustani classical music, is a stick zither. About 3.5 to 4 feet (1 to 1.2 meters) long to fit the measurements of the musician, it has a hollow body and two large resonating gourds, one under each end. It has four main strings which are melodic, and three auxiliary drone strings. To play, the musician plucks the melody strings downward with a plectrum worn on the first and second fingers, while the drone strings are strummed with the little finger of the playing hand. The musician stops the resonating strings, when so desired, with the fingers of the free hand. In modern times the veena has been generally replaced with the sitar in North Indian performances.

The South Indian Saraswati veena, used in Carnatic classical music, is a lute. It is a long-necked, pear-shaped lute, but instead of the lower gourd of the North Indian design, it has a pear-shaped wooden piece. However it, too, has 24 frets, four melody strings, and three drone strings, and is played similarly. It remains an important and popular string instrument in classical Carnatic music.

As a fretted, plucked lute, the veena can produce pitches in a full three-octave range. The long, hollow neck design of these Indian instruments allows portamento effects and legato ornaments found in Indian ragas. It has been a popular instrument in Indian classical music, and one revered in the Indian culture by its inclusion in the iconography of Saraswati, the Hindu goddess of arts and learning.

== Etymology and history ==
See: Ancient veena :See: History of lute-family instruments

Historical vinas, harp, lute and stick zither

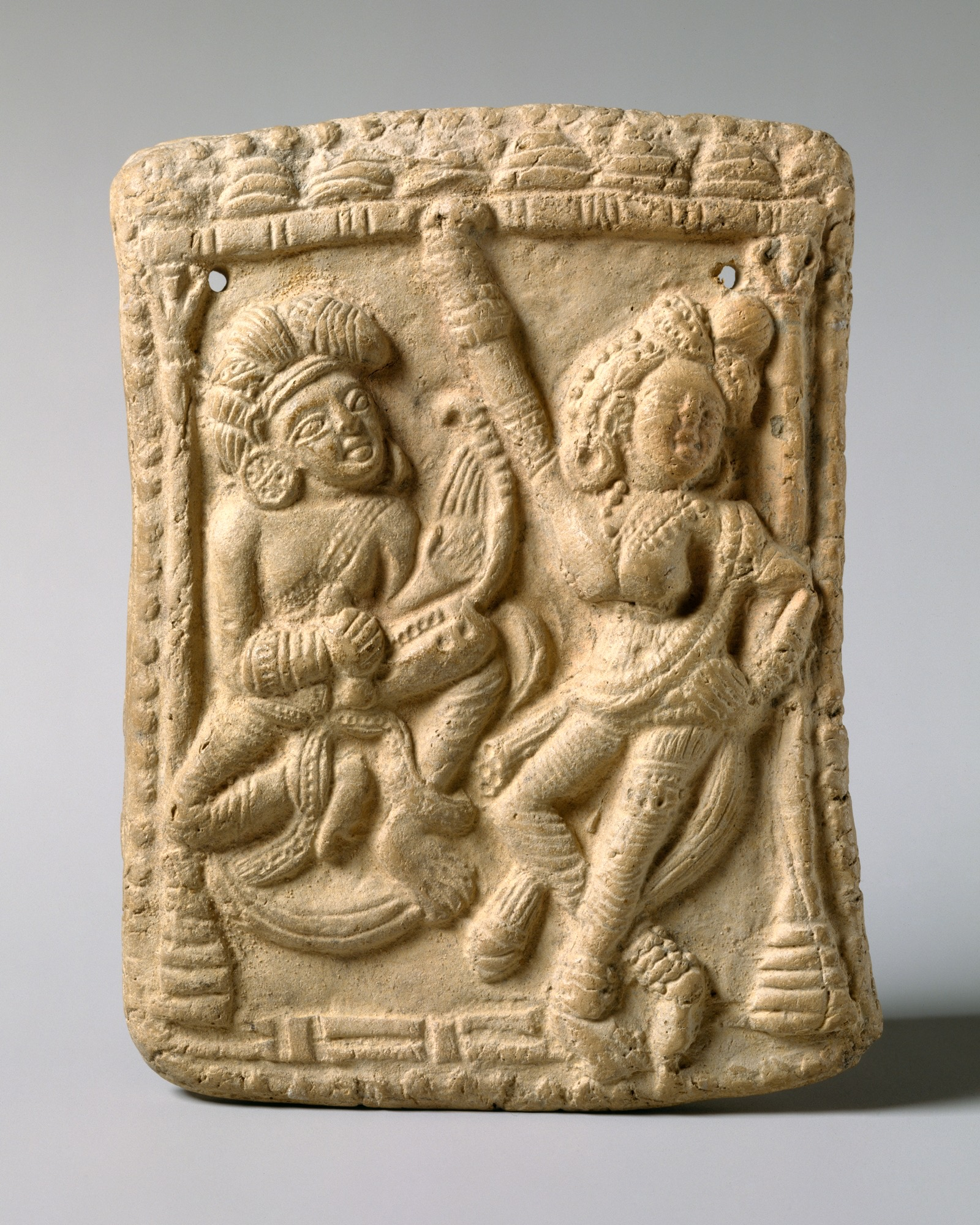
Plaque with a dancer and a veena (harp) player 1st century B.C.

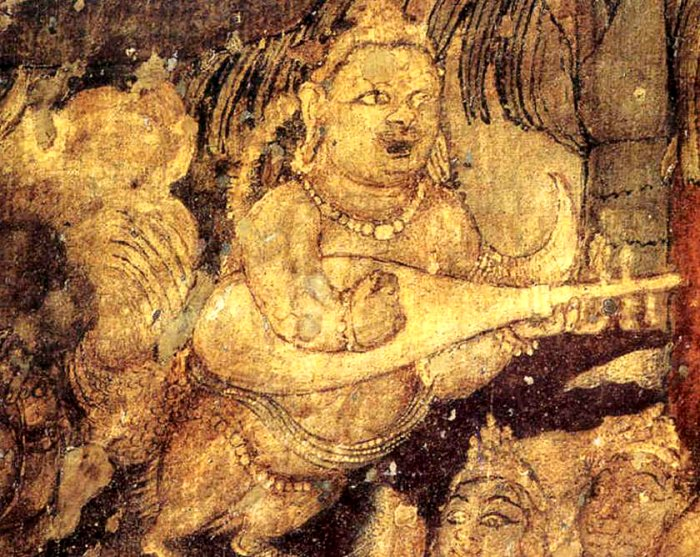
India, ca. 450-490 CE, Ajanta Caves. A Kinnara holding a lute-type veena, possibly a kacchapī veena (Sanskrit for "tortoise veena"). No description survives to go with name.

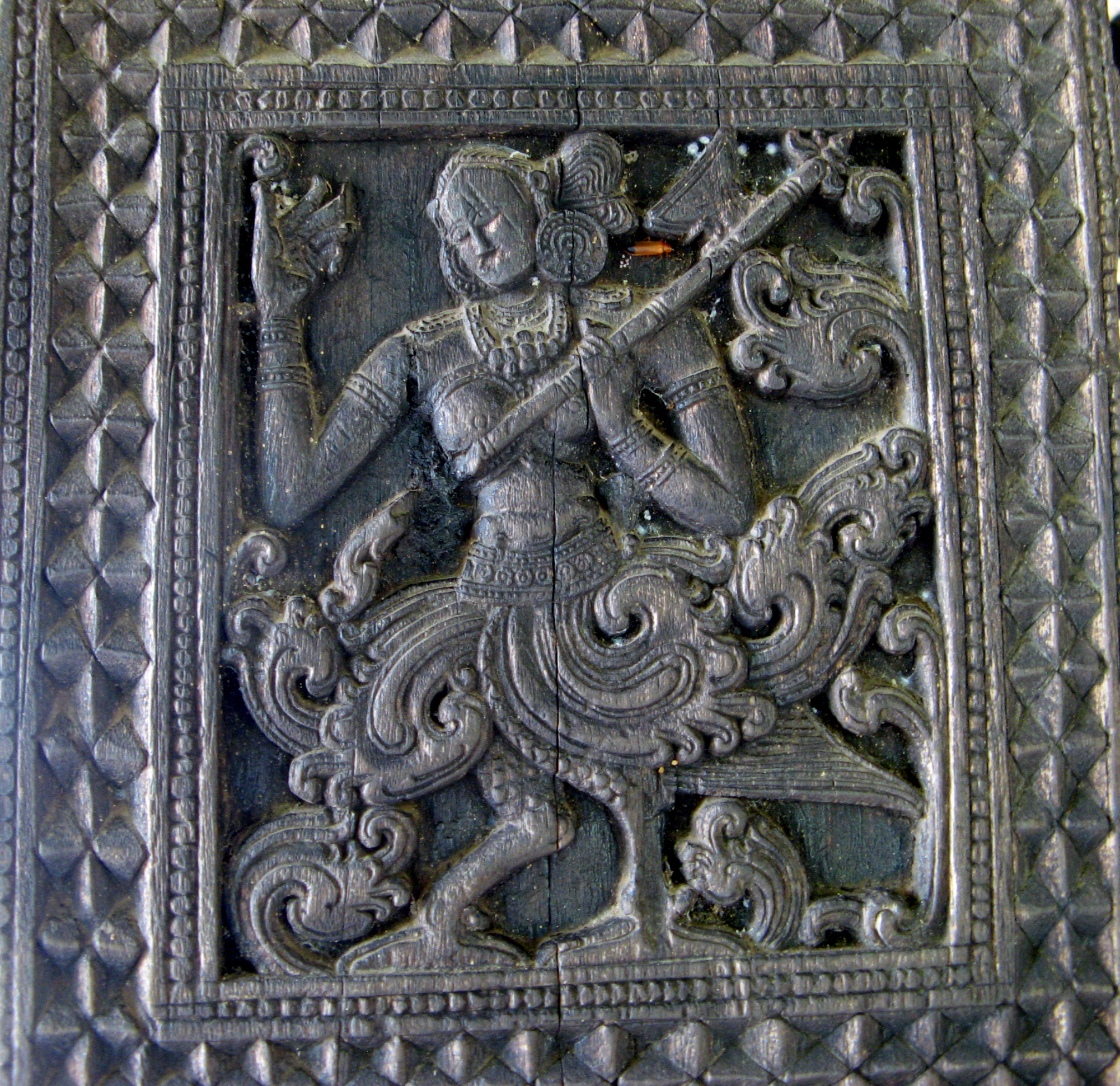
Embekka Devalaya temple, Sri Lanka. A Kinnari holds an ālāpīni vīnī, a type of stick-zither with a half gourd used for the resonator.

The Sanskrit word veena (वीणा) in ancient and medieval Indian literature is a generic term for plucked string musical instruments. It is mentioned in the Rigveda, Samaveda and other Vedic literature such as the Shatapatha Brahmana and Taittiriya Samhita.

In the ancient texts, Narada is credited with inventing the Tanpura, described as a seven-string instrument with frets. According to Suneera Kasliwal, a professor of music, in the ancient texts such as the Rigveda and Atharvaveda (both pre-1000 BCE), as well as the Upanishads (c. 800–300 BCE), a string instrument is called vana, a term that evolved to become veena. The early Sanskrit texts call any stringed instrument vana; these include bowed, plucked, one string, many strings, fretted, non-fretted, zither, lute or harp lyre-style string instruments.

A person who plays a veena is called a vainika.

The Natya Shastra by Bharata Muni, the oldest surviving ancient Hindu text on classical music and performance arts, discusses the veena. This Sanskrit text, probably complete between 200 BCE and 200 CE, begins its discussion by stating that "the human throat is a sareer veena, or a body's musical string instrument" when it is perfected, and that the source of gandharva music is such a throat, a string instrument and flute. The same metaphor of human voice organ being a form of veena, is also found in more ancient texts of Hinduism, such as in verse 3.2.5 of the Aitareya Aranyaka, verse 8.9 of the Shankhayana Aranyaka and others. The ancient epic Mahabharata describes the sage Narada as a Vedic sage famed as a "vina player".

The Natya Shastra describes a seven-string instrument and other string instruments in 35 verses, and then explains how the instrument should be played. The technique of performance suggests that the veena in Bharata Muni's time was quite different than the zither or the lute that became popular after the Natya Shastra was complete. The ancient veena, according to Allyn Miner and other scholars, was closer to an arched harp. The earliest lute and zither style veena playing musicians are evidenced in Hindu and Buddhist cave temple reliefs in the early centuries of the common era. Similarly, Indian sculptures from the mid-1st millennium CE depict musicians playing string instruments. By about the 6th century CE, the goddess Saraswati sculptures are predominantly with veena of the zither-style, similar to modern styles.

=== The early Gupta veena: depiction and playing technique ===
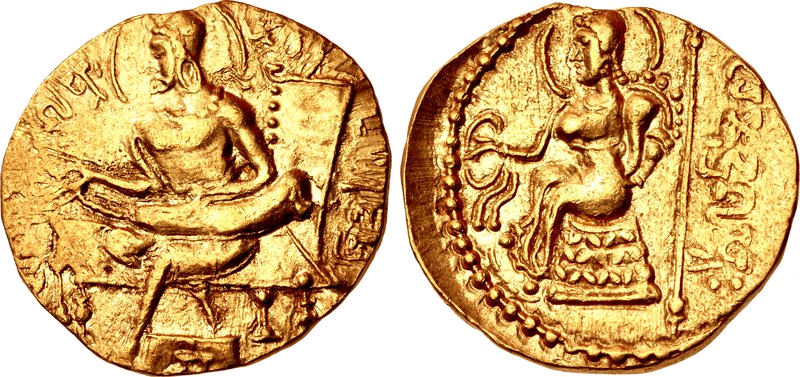
Coin ca. 335-380 CE. (Front side) Samudragupta seated left on a low couch or throne, playing veena set on his knees. (Reverse side) Lakshmi seated left on wicker stool, holding diadem and cornucopia.

One of the early veenas used in India from early times until the Gupta period was an instrument of the harp type, and more precisely of the arched harp. It was played with the strings kept parallel to the body of the player, with both hands plucking the strings, as shown on Samudragupta's gold coins. The Veena Cave at Udayagiri has one of the earliest visual depictions of a veena player, considered to be Samudragupta.

== Construction ==
Saraswati and the vina

1896. Saraswati with a southern style "Saraswati veena" instrument.

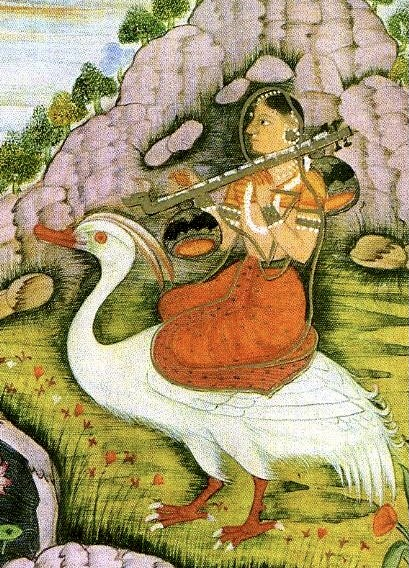
Ca. 1700. Saraswati riding a white bird and holding a northern style bīn (rudra vīnā).

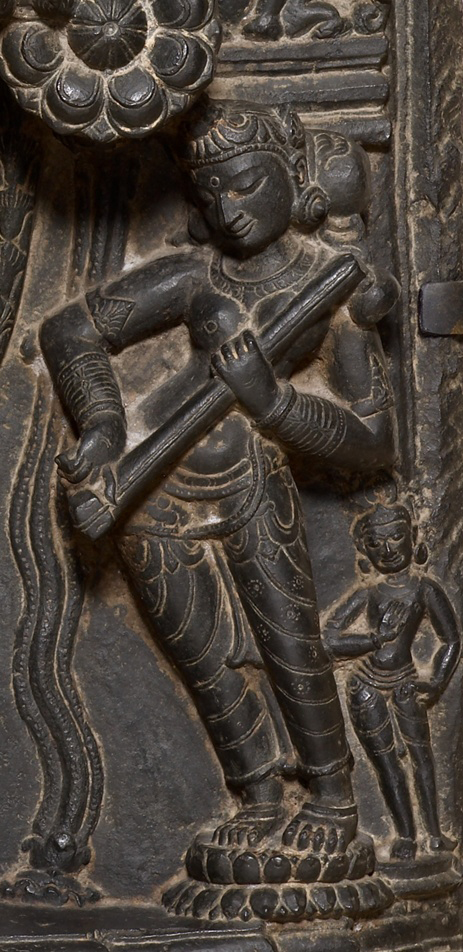
Bangladesh, 10th-12th century CE Saraswati with an ālāpiṇī vīṇā.

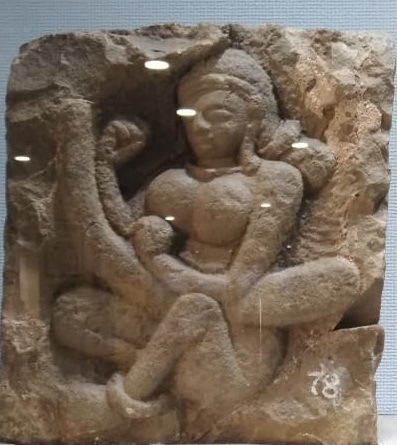
Saraswati, 3rd century CE with harp-style veena. Variations included the chitra vīṇā with seven strings and vipanchi vīṇā with 9 strings. Chitra veena refers to another instrument today.

The Hindu Goddess Saraswati has been pictured holding different veenas over the centuries. The oldest known Saraswati-like relief carvings are from Buddhist archaeological sites dated to 200 BCE, where she holds a harp-style veena.

At a first glance, the difference between the North and South Indian design is the presence of two resonant gourds in the North, while in the South, instead of the lower gourd there is a pear-shaped wooden body attached. However, there are other differences, and many similarities. Modern designs use fiberglass or other materials instead of hollowed jackwood and gourds. The construction is personalized to the musician's body proportions so that she can hold and play it comfortably. It ranges from about 3.5 to 4 feet (1 to 1.2 meters). The body is made of special wood and is hollow. Both designs have four melody strings, three drone strings and twenty-four frets. The instrument's end is generally tastefully shaped such as a swan and the external surfaces colorfully decorated with traditional Indian designs.

The melody strings are tuned in c' g c G (the tonic, the fifth, the octave and the fourth), from which sarani (chanterelle) is frequently used. The drone strings are tuned in c" g' c' (the double octave, the tonic and the octave). The drones are typically used to create rhythmic tanams of Indian classical music and to express harmony with clapped tala of the piece.

The main string is called Nāyakī Tār (नायकी तार), and in the Sarasvati veena it is on the onlooked's left side. The instrument is played with three fingers of the right (dominant) hand, struck inward or outward with a bent-wire plectrum (a "mizrab"). The index and second fingers strike inward on the melody string, alternating between notes, and the little finger strikes outward on the sympathetic strings.

The bola alphabets struck in the North Indian veena are da, ga, ra on the main strings, and many others by a combination of fingers and other strings. The veena settings and tuning may be fixed or adjusted by loosening the pegs, to perform Dhruva from fixed and Cala with loosened pegs such that the second string and first string coincide.

One of the earliest description of the terminology currently used for veena construction, modification and operation appears in Sangita Cudamani by Govinda.

== Types ==
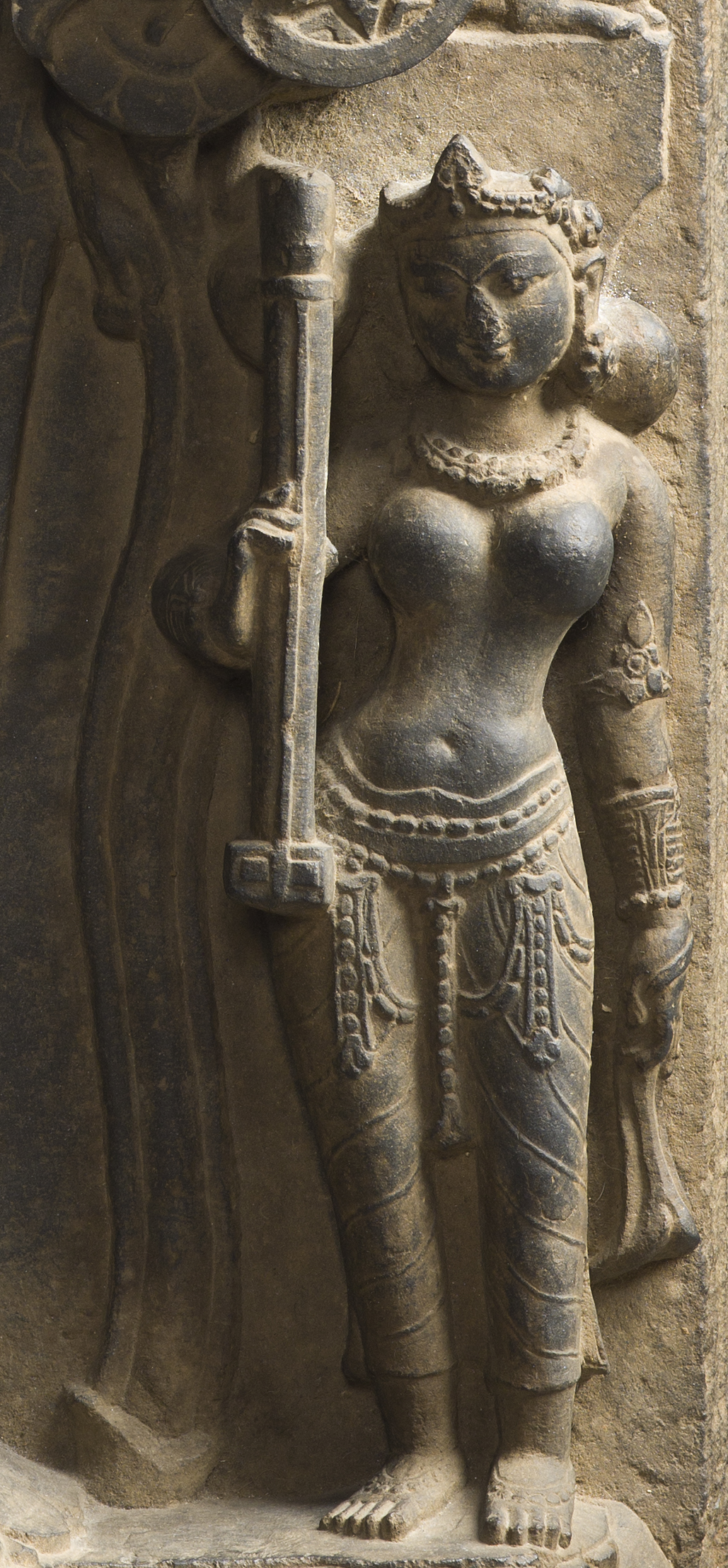
Saraswati holding an Eka-tantri vina, ca. 1000 CE

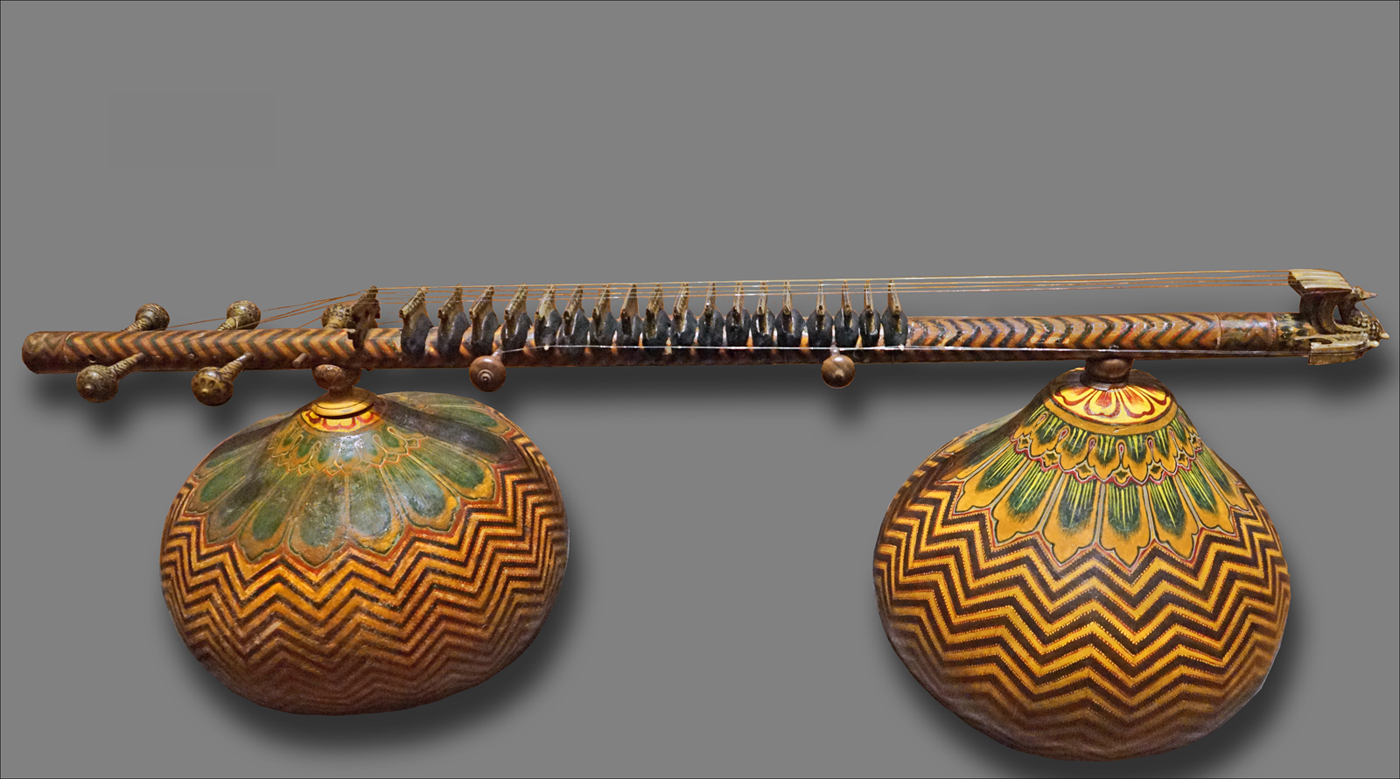
A rudra veena, now at Musée de la Musique (Paris). The frets are held to the body by a black wax.

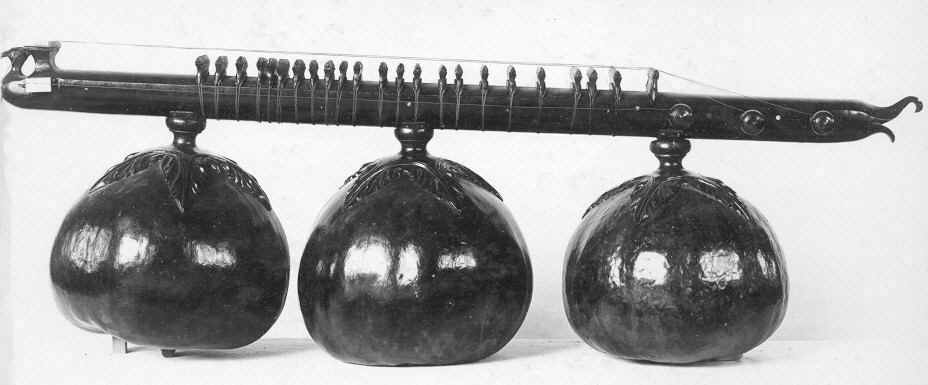
Kinnari vina, 19th century CE, from the Metropolitan Museum of Art.

The eka-tantri developed from the alapini veena. It was longer and had a larger gourd. Over time gourds were added and the instrument may have developed into the rudra veena and the kinnari veena.

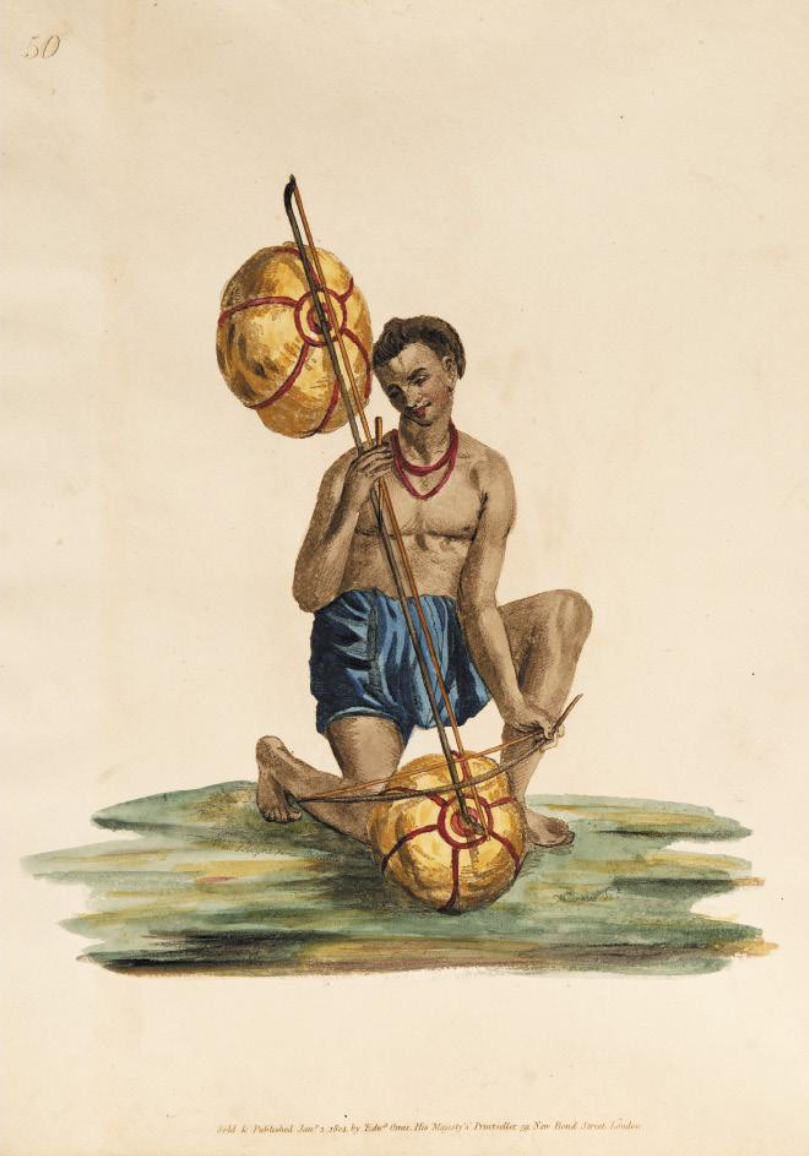
India, early 19th century. Pinaka veena. Stick used on string as a slide, to choose notes.

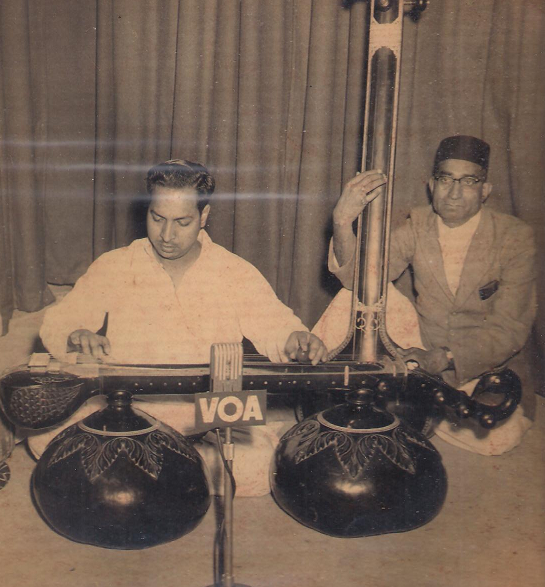
Vichitra veena, uses a slide to choose notes instead of frets.

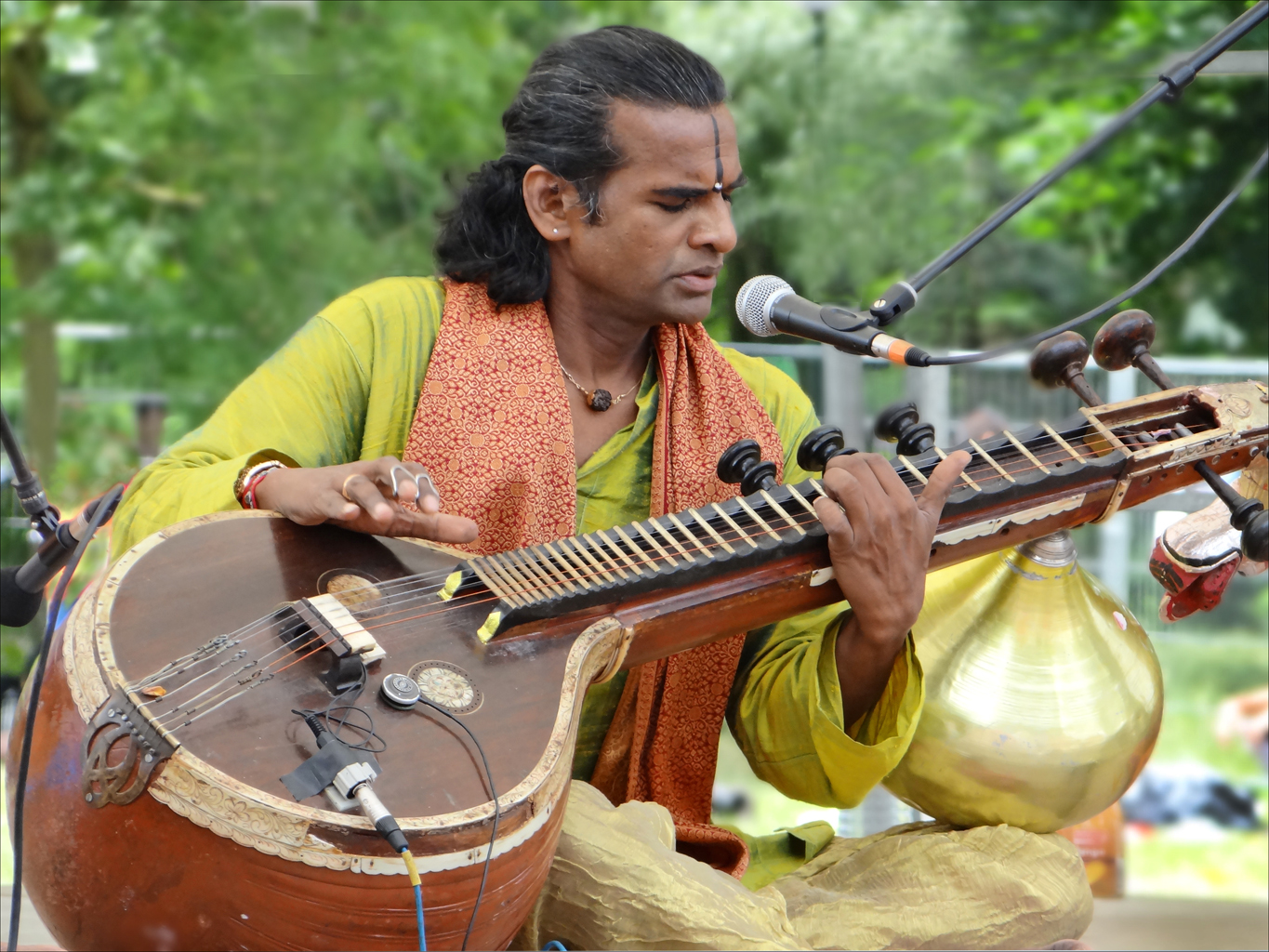
Saraswati veena

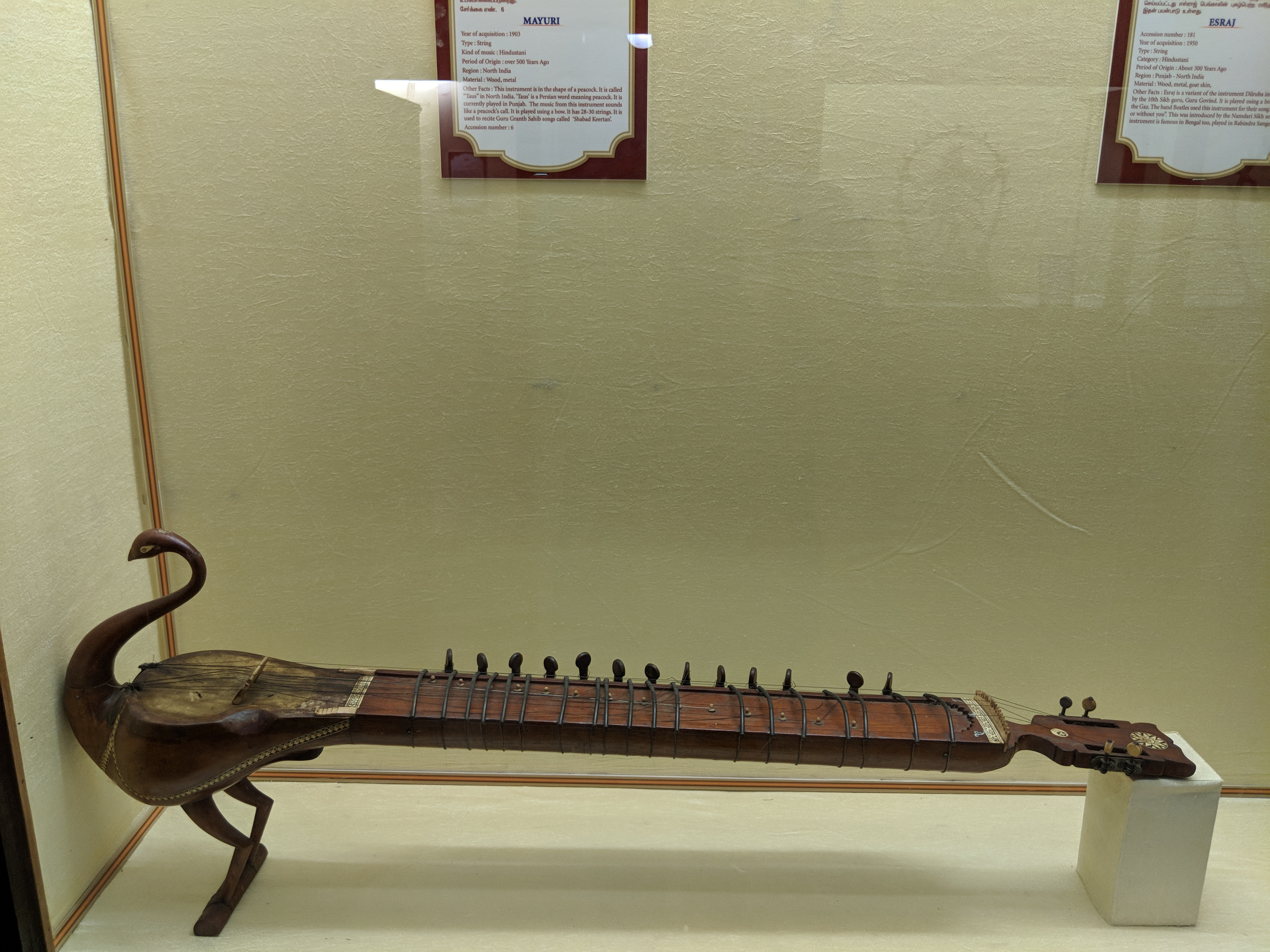
Mayuri veena, 1903

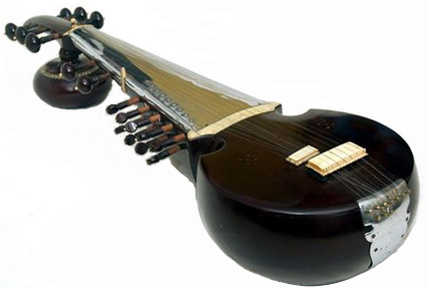
A Mohan veena.

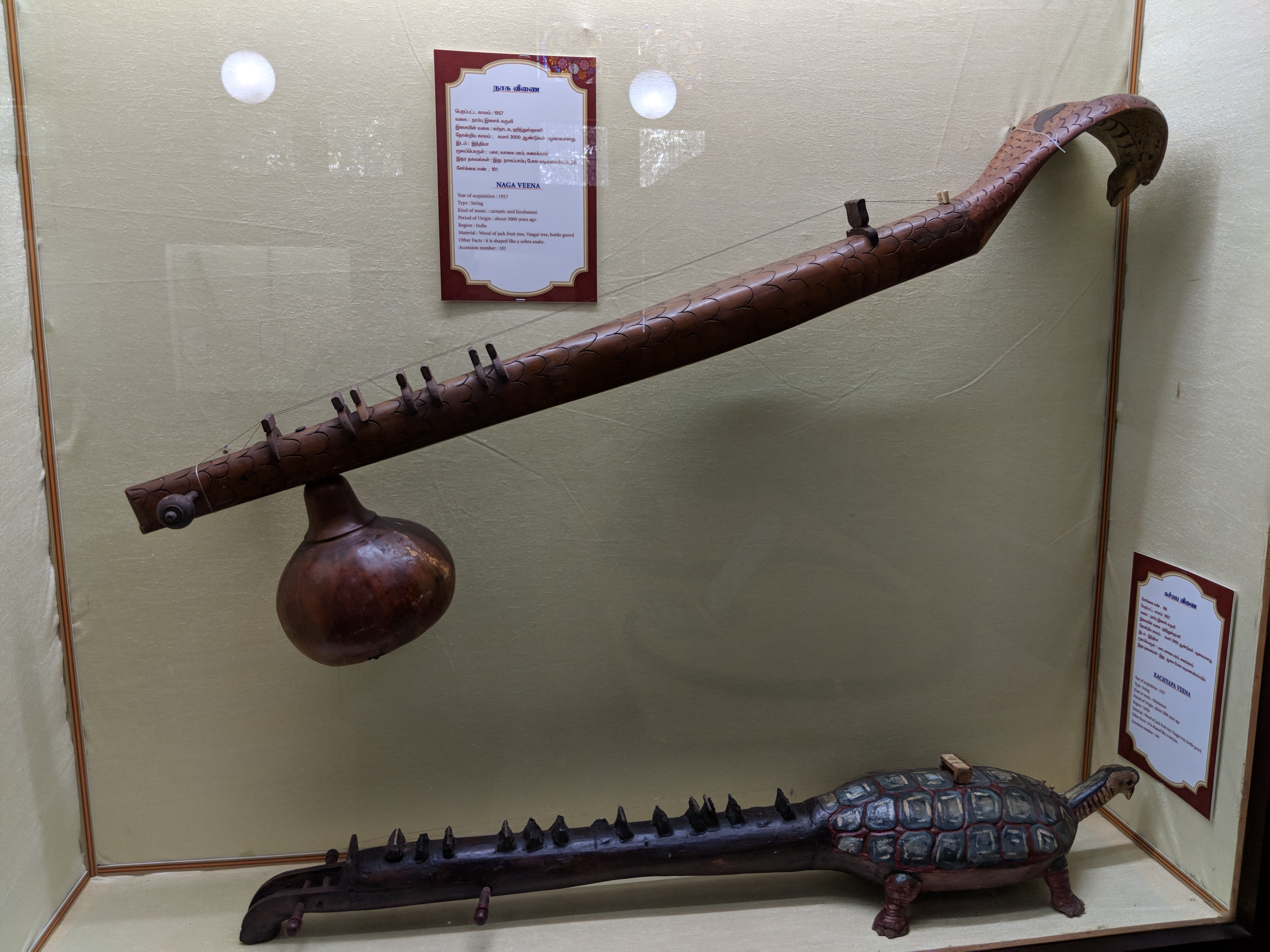
Modern recreations of Naga veena (1957) and Kachyapi vina (1957)

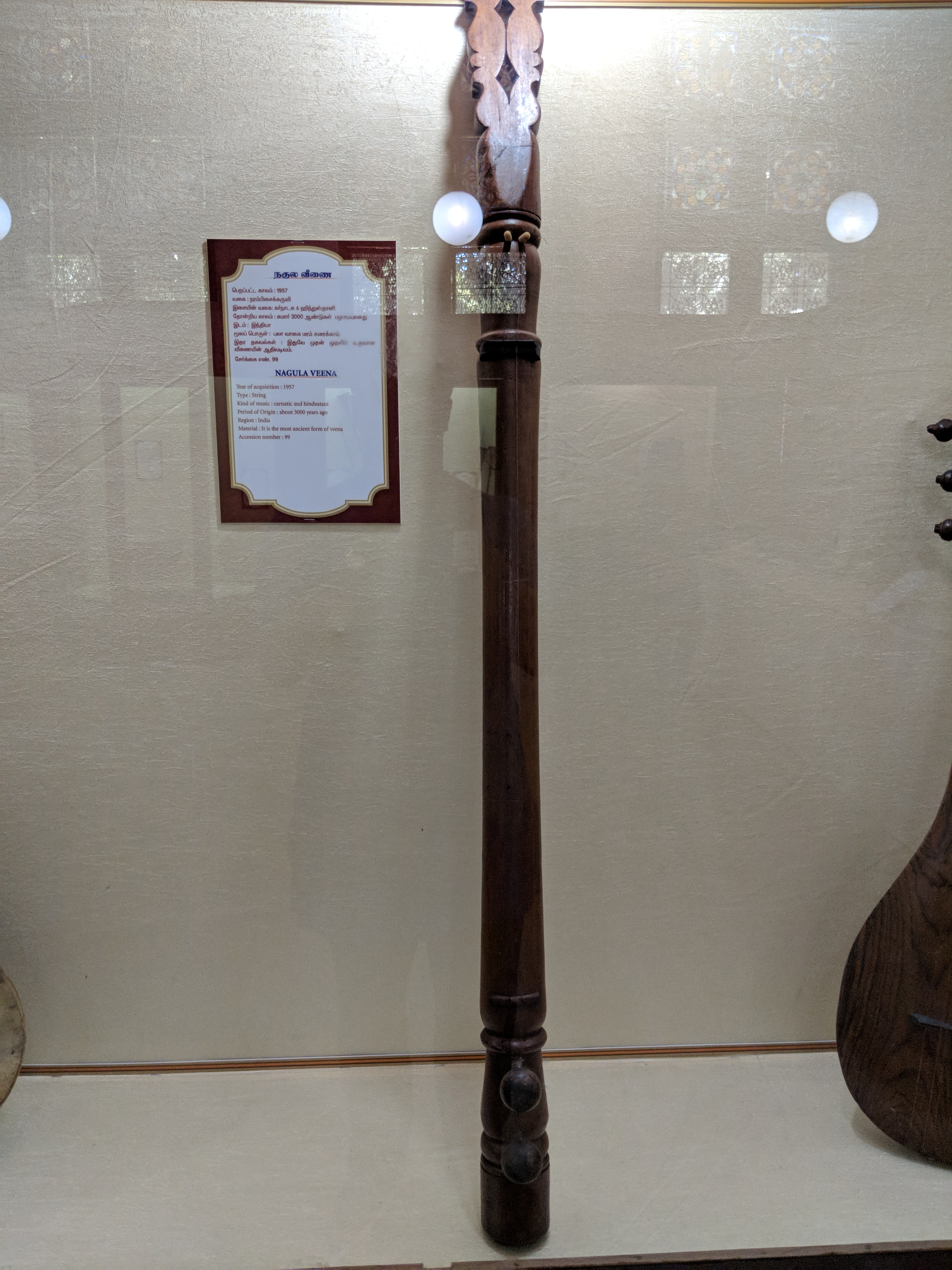
Modern recreation of Nagula vina

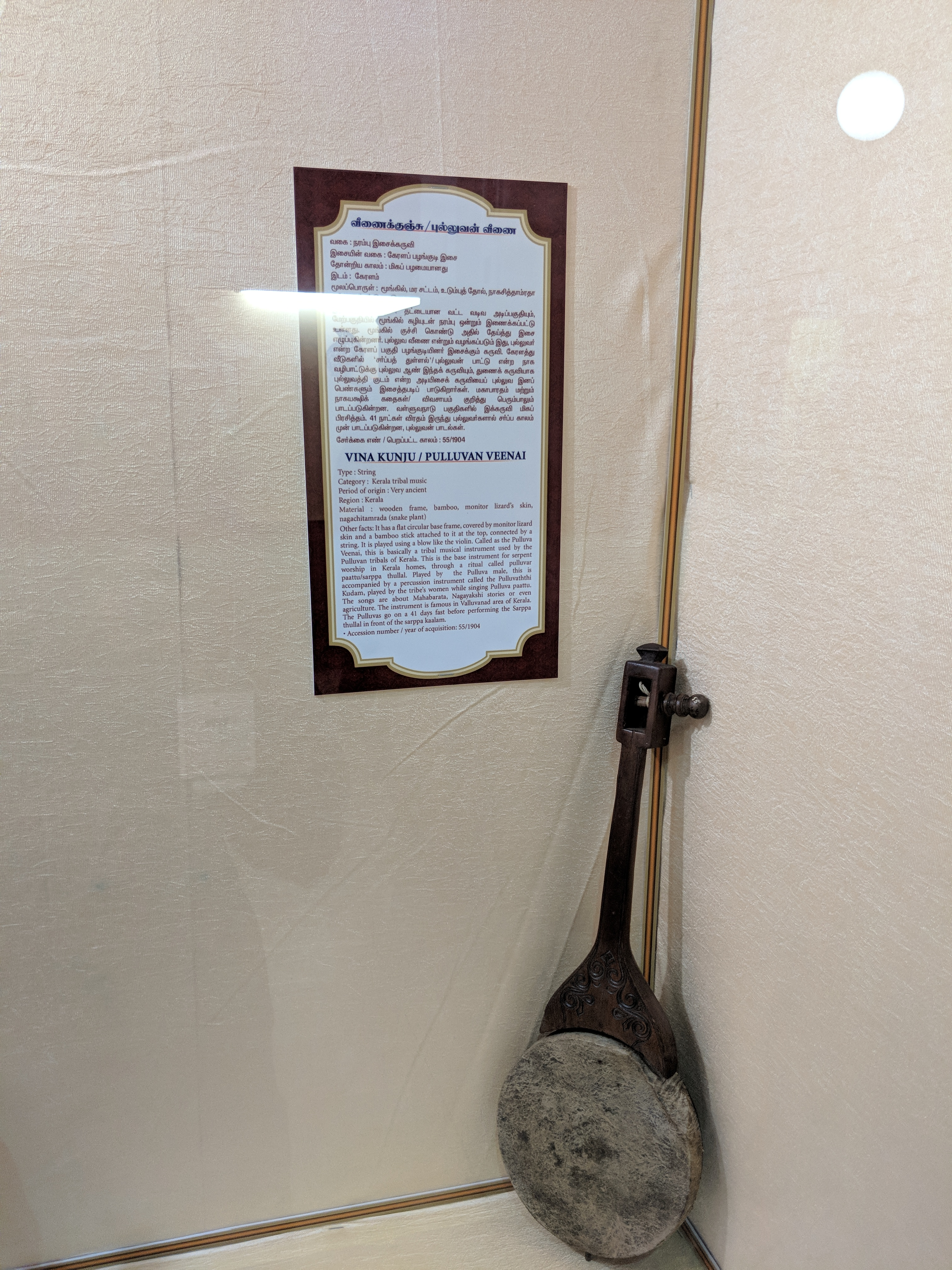
Pulluva veena used by the Pulluvan tribals of Kerala in religious ceremony and Pulluvan paattu.

Being a generic name for any string instrument, there are numerous types of veena. Some significant ones are:

- Rudra veena is a fretted veena, with two large equal size tumba (resonators) below a stick zither. This instrument is played by laying it slanting with one gourd on a knee and other above the shoulder. The mythology states that this instrument was created by god Shiva It may be a post-6th century medieval era invention. According to Alain Daniélou, this instrument is more ancient, and its older known versions from 6th to 10th century had just one resonator with the seven strings made from different metals.
- Saraswati veena is another fretted veena, and one highly revered in Indian traditions, particularly Hinduism. This is often pictured, shown as two resonators of different size. Previously known as Raghunatha veena, during the period of King Raghunatha Nayaka. This is played by holding it at about a 45-degree angle across one's body, and the smaller gourd over the musician's left thigh. This instrument is related to an ancient instrument of South India, around the region of Cauvery delta, where the ancient version is called Nanthuni or Nanduruni.
- Vichitra veena and Chitra veena or gottuvadhyam do not have frets. It sounds close to humming human singer. The Vichitra veena is played with a piece of ovoid or round glass, which is used to stop the strings to create delicate musical ornaments and slides during a performance.
- Sitar is a Persian word meaning three strings. Legends state that Amir Khusro of Delhi Sultanate renamed the Tritantri veena to sitar, but this is unlikely because the list of musical instruments created by Akbar historians makes no mention of sitar or sitariya. The sitar has been popular with Indian Muslim musicians.
- Surbahar the base tuned version of the Sitar, created due to the fact that Sitar players wanted to play a bass tone like that of the Rudra veena.
- Ālāpiṇī vīṇā. Historical. A one string stick-zither style veena, shorter than the one string Eka-tantri vina. It had one half-gourd resonator, which was pressed into the player's chest while plucking the string.
- Bobbili Veena, a specialized Saraswati veena, carved from a single piece of wood. Named for Bobbili in Andhra Pradesh, where the instrument originated.
- Chitra veena, a modern 21-string fretless lute, also called Gottuvadhyam or Kotuvadya.
- Chitra veena, a 7-string arched harp, mainstream from ancient times until about the 5th century CE.
- Kachapi veena, now called Kachua sitar, built with a wooden model of a turtle or tortoise as a resonator.
- Kinnari veena, one of three veena types mentioned in the Sangita Ratnakara (written 1210–1247 CE) by Śārṅgadeva. The other two mentioned were the Ālāpiṇī vīṇā and the Eka-tantri vina. Tube zither with multiple gourds for resonators. In surviving museum examples, the center gourd is open where it presses against the player's chest, like the Kse diev or Ālāpiṇī vīṇā.
- Pinaki veena, related to Sarangi. Historical. A bowed Veena, resembling the rudra veena. The notes were picked by moving a stick or coconut shell along the string.
- Pulluva veena, used by the Pulluvan tribe of Kerala in religious ceremonies and Pulluvan pāttu.
- Mattakokila vīṇā (meaning "intoxicated cuckoo"), a 21-string instrument, mentioned in literature, type unproven. Possibly an ancient veena (arched harp) or a board zither.
- Mohan veena, A modified sarod, created by sarod player Radhika Mohan Maitra in the 1940s. Made out of a modified Hawaiian guitar and a sarod.
- Mayuri veena, Also called Taus (derived from Arabic tawwus meaning, peacock), an instrument with the carving of a peacock as a resonator, decorated with genuine peacock feathers.
- Mukha veena, A blowing instrument.
- Naga veena, An instrument with the carving of a snake for decoration.
- Nagula veena, An instrument with no resonator.
- Shatatantri veena
- Gayatri veena (with one string only)
- Saptatantri veena
- Ranjan veena
- Sagar veena, a Pakistani instrument, created in 1970 by prominent Pakistani lawyer Raza Kazim.
- Saradiya veena, now called Sarod.
- Thanjavur veena, a specialized Saraswati veena, carved from a single piece of wood. Named for Thanjavur in Tamil Nadu, where the instrument originated.
- Triveni veena

== See also ==
- Pandura
- Sarod
- Sitar
- Surbahar
- Sursingar
- Tambouras
- Tambura
