= Bindu =

Bindu (Sanskrit: बिंदु) is a term meaning "point" or "dot". Bindu may also refer to:

- Bindu (symbol), a point symbol in Indian religions
- Bindu, India, village in Darjeeling district of West Bengal India
- Anusvara, a diacritical mark in Indic scripts represented as a bindu or dot
- Nuqta, diacritical mark in Indic scripts represented as a bindu or dot
- Bindu (film), a 2009 Sri Lankan Sinhala children's film
- Bindu, the titular character of the 2017 Indian romantic comedy film Meri Pyaari Bindu, played by Parineeti Chopra
- Bindu, character in the 2012 Indian fantasy film Eega, played by Samantha Ruth Prabhu

== People ==
- Bindu (actress) (born 1941), Indian actress with over 160 acting credits
- Bindu (Bangladeshi actress) (born 1988), Bangladeshi actress
- Bindu Madhavi (born 1986), Indian model and actress in Tamil and Telugu films
- Bindu Panicker (born 1968), Indian actress in Malayalam films
- R. Bindu, former mayor of Thrissur Municipal Corporation
- Bindu Bhatt (born 1954), Indian novelist and short story writer
- Bindu of Bukhara (died 681), king of Bukhara
- Bindu Madhav Pathak (1935–2004), Indian musician
