= Pinaka =

Pinaka may refer to:

- Pinaka (Hinduism) or Shiva Dhanusha, the bow of the Hindu god Shiva
- Pinaka vina, the musical instrument named after Shiva's bow
- Pinaka Multi Barrel Rocket Launcher, a rocket system used by the Indian army
- Pinaka, Corduene, Kurdish Finik
- Pinaka MBRL - Indian Rocket launcher
