= Alapini veena and ekatantri veena =

Ālāpiṇī vīṇā and eka-tantrī vīṇā

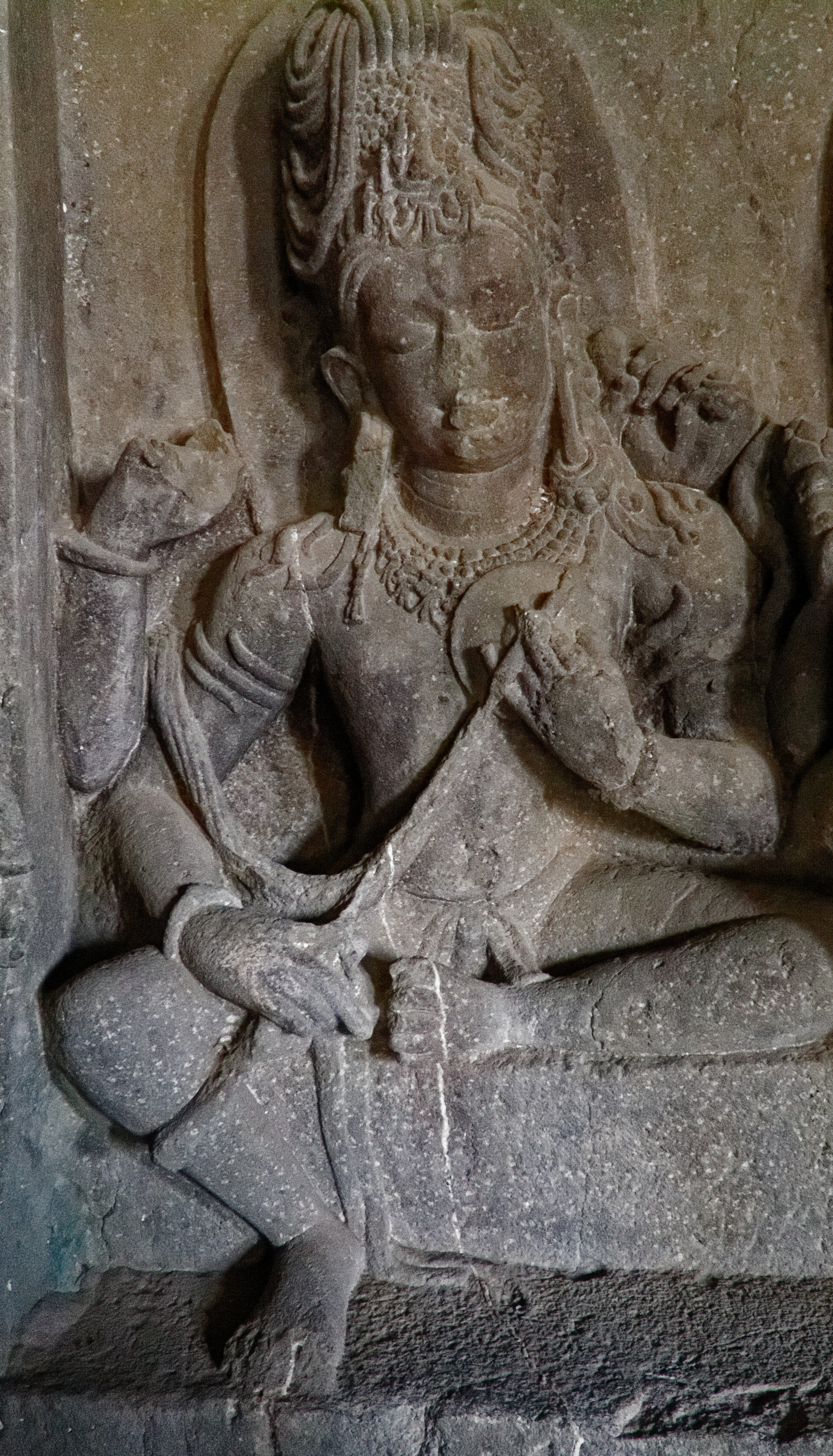
India, Ellora Caves, cave 21, 7th-8th century C.E. Shiva with an ālāpiṇī vīṇā.

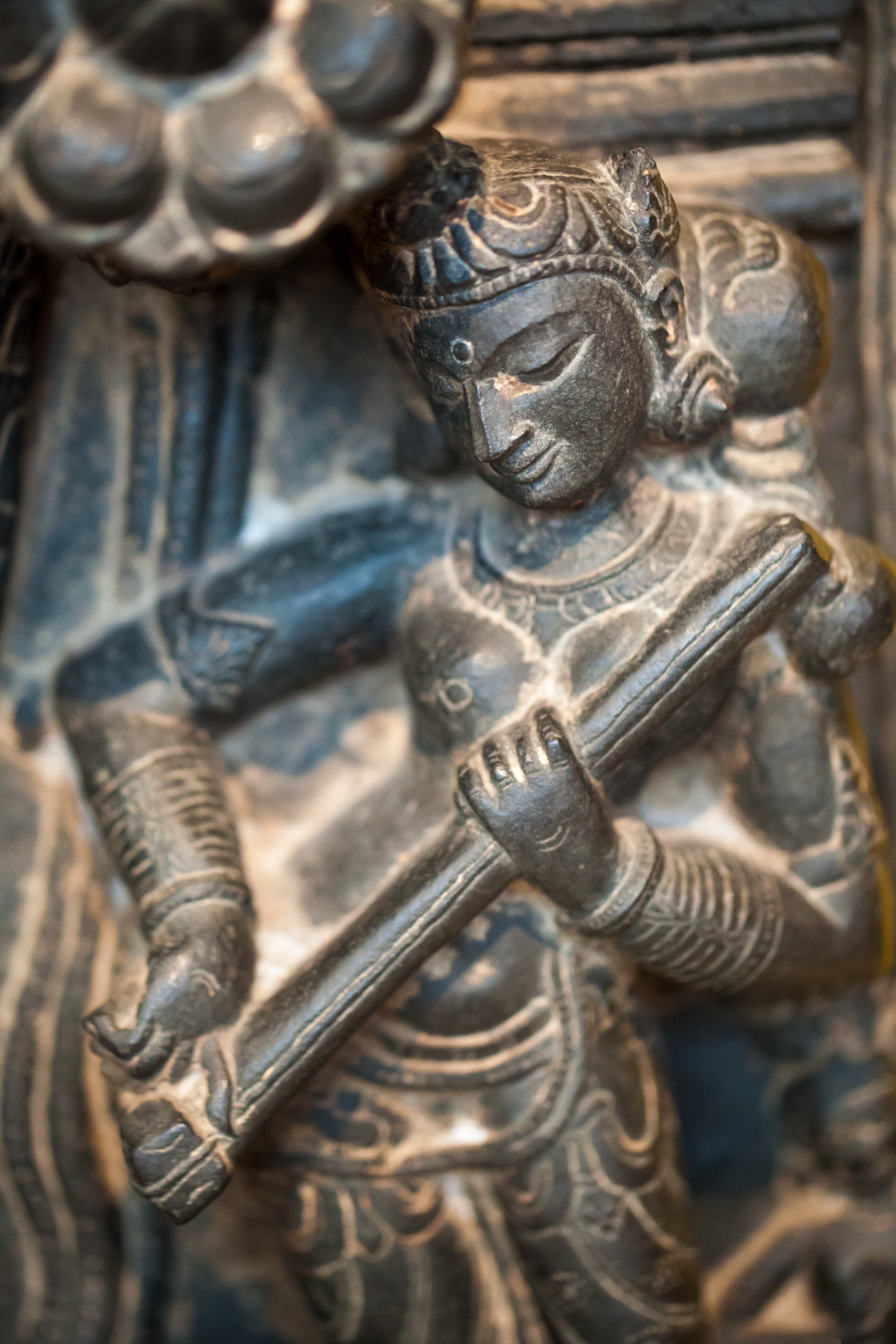
Bangladesh, Pala period 10th–12th century C.E. Saraswati with a tube zither, an ālāpiṇī vīṇā or eka-tantrī vīṇā.

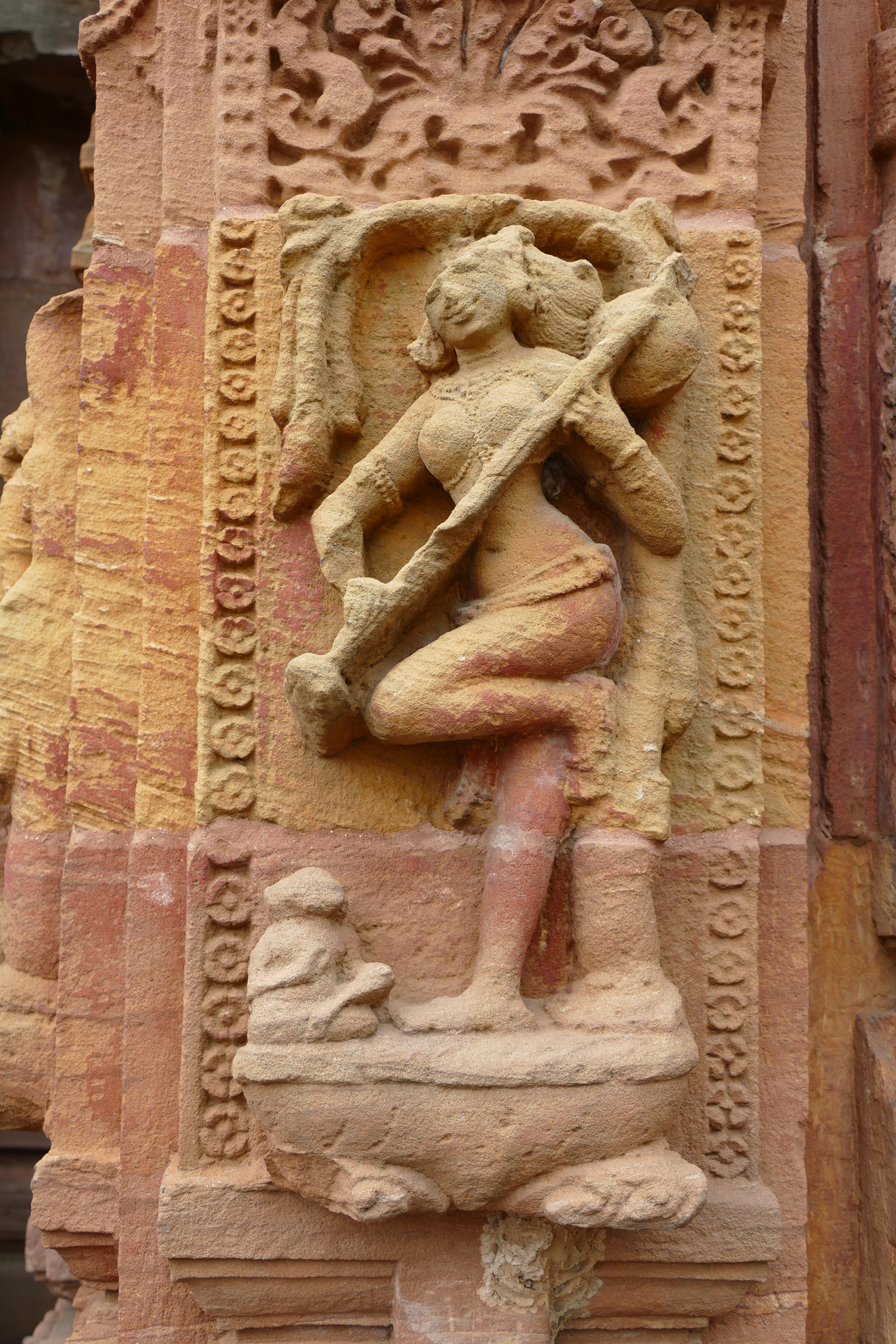
Eka-tantrī vīṇā at Mukteshvara Temple of Bhubaneswar, ca. 10th century C.E.

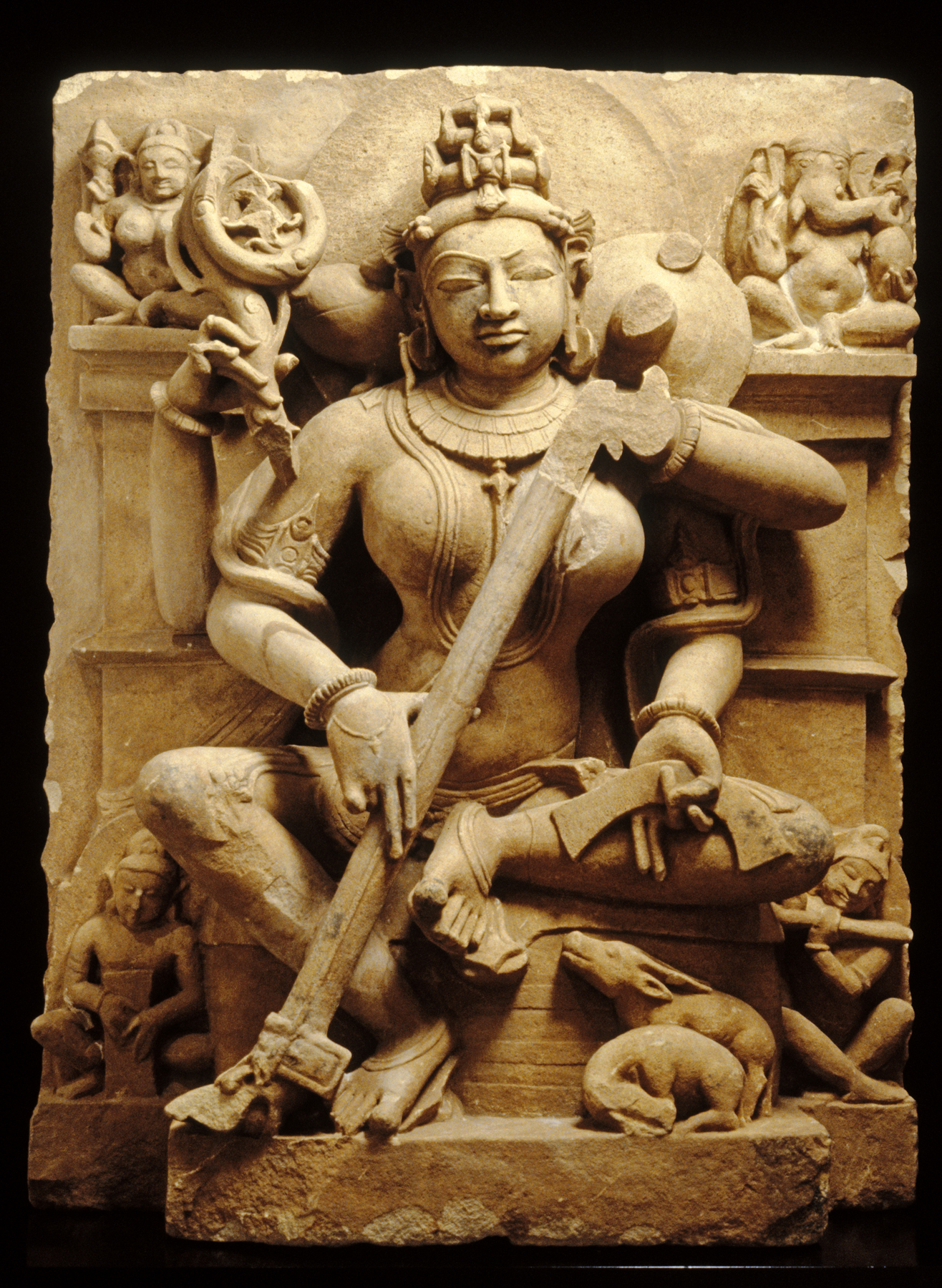
India, 10th century C.E. Image of Saraswati holding an eka-tantri vina, a type of tube zither.

The alapini vina is represented in sculpture with two thickness of tube or stick. Earliest images show a much thinner stick. By the 10th—12th century C.E., the larger tube zither form was common as well. The far-right image shows many details missing from depictions of the eka-tantri vina: the longer length of the instrument, thick tube, the large gourd at the top, the playing style over the shoulder, the stylized mouth at the bottom of the instrument, a bridge on the rectangle just above the mouth.

The ālāpiṇī vīṇā and the eka-tantrī vīṇā were medieval stick-zither and tube-zither veenas in India, with single strings and gourd resonators. The instruments became prominent in Indian music after 500 C.E. as instruments of court music. They replaced the harp-style veenas and lute-style veenas. The instruments were used in Southeast Asia, both mainland and island nations, and were recorded in sculpture and relief sculpture.

Although the tube zithers and stick zithers are very similar, it is possible that they have different origins. Early paintings of stick zithers in India date back at least to the 5th century C.E. The earliest currently known stick zither is in the Caves of Ajanta at the end of the 5th century. After a period of assuming that tube zithers spread from India to Southeast Asia, modern scholars have been trying to decide if the tube zithers might have originated in Southeast Asia and spread to India. Whatever the origins, Indian influence on musical culture in Southeast Asia is recorded in the archaeological remains of past civilizations.
