= Rudra veena =

Plucked Hindustani string instrument

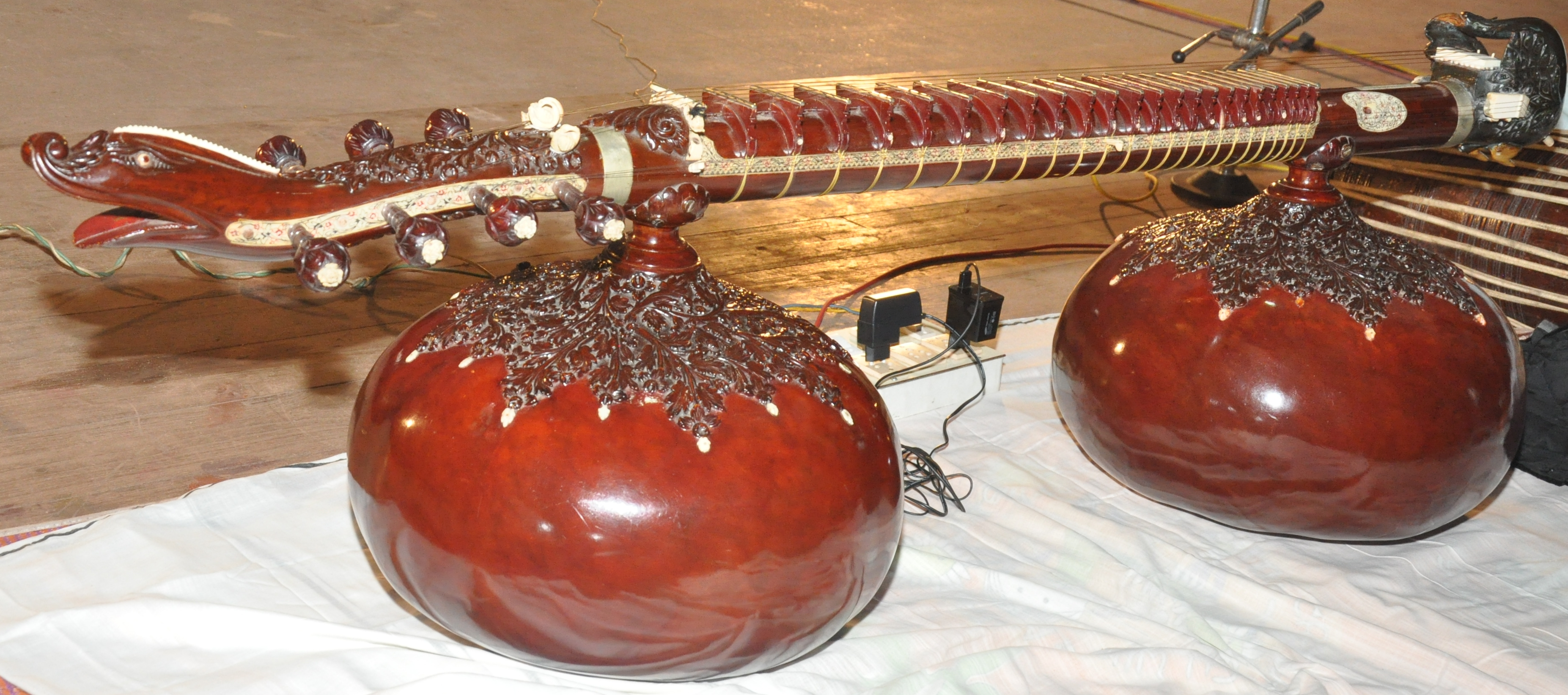
- Rudra veena

String instrument
- Other names: Rudra vīnā, Been, Bin
- Classification: String instrument
- Hornbostel–Sachs classification: 311.222 (stick zither)

Musicians
- Asit Kumar Banerjee; Bahauddin Dagar (born 1970); Zia Mohiuddin Dagar (1929–1990); Shamsuddin Faridi Desai (1938-2011); Hindraj Divekar (1954–2019); Jyoti Hegde; Asad Ali Khan (1937–2011); Bande Ali Khan (1826–1890); Naubat Khan; Omrao Khan; Rajab Ali Khan; Wazir Khan; Dattatreya Parvatikar (1916–1990); Bindu Madhav Pathak (1935–2004); Carsten Wicke (born 1970); Madhuvanti Pal

More articles or information
- Veena, Saraswati veena, Vichitra veena, Chitra veena, Pinaka veena, Alapini veena, Shata-Tantri Veena

The rudra veena (Sanskrit: रुद्र वीणा) (also spelled rudraveena or rudra vīnā), also called the bīn in North India, is a large plucked string instrument used in Hindustani music, especially dhrupad. It is one of the major types of veena played in Indian classical music, notable for its deep bass resonance. Oral tradition ascribes the instrument to Shiva, an important deity within Hinduism.

The rudra veena is seen in temple architecture predating the Mughals. It is also mentioned in court records as early as the reign of Zain-ul Abidin (1418–1470), and attained particular importance among Mughal court musicians. Before independence, rudra veena players, as dhrupad practitioners, were supported by the princely states; after independence and the political integration of India, this traditional patronage system ended. With the end of this traditional support, dhrupad's popularity in India declined, as did the popularity of the rudra veena. However, in recent years, the rudra veena has seen a resurgence in popularity, driven at least partly by interest among non-Indian musicians.

== Names and etymology ==
The name "rudra veena" comes from Rudra, an epithet of Shiva; rudra vina means "the veena of Shiva" (compare Saraswati veena).

The North Indian vernacular name "bīn" (sometimes written "bīṇ") is derived from the preexisting root "veena," the term generally used today to refer to a number of South Asian stringed instruments. While the origins of "veena" are obscure, one possible derivation is from a pre-Aryan root meaning "bamboo" (possibly Dravidian, as in the Tamil veṟam, "cane," or South Indian bamboo flute, the venu), a reference to early stick or tube zithers—as seen in the modern bīn, whose central dandi tube is still sometimes made from bamboo.

== Form and construction ==
The rudra veena is classified either as a stick zither or tube zither in the Hornbostel–Sachs classification system. The veena's body (dandi) is a tube of bamboo or teak between 137 and 158 cm (54 and 62 in) long, attached to two large tumba resonators made from calabash gourds. The tumbas on a rudra veena are around 34 to 37 cm (13 to 15 in) in diameter; while veena players once attached tumbas to the dandi with leather thongs, modern instruments use brass screw tubes to attach the tumbas.

Traditionally, the bottom end of the dandi, where the strings attach below the bridge (jawari), is finished with a peacock carving. This peacock carving is hollow, to enhance the resonance of the instrument. This hollow opens into the tube of the dandi, and is covered directly by the main jawari. The other end of the instrument, holding most or all of the pegs, is finished with a carved makara. Like the peacock at the other end and the dandi tube connecting them, the makara pegbox is also hollow.

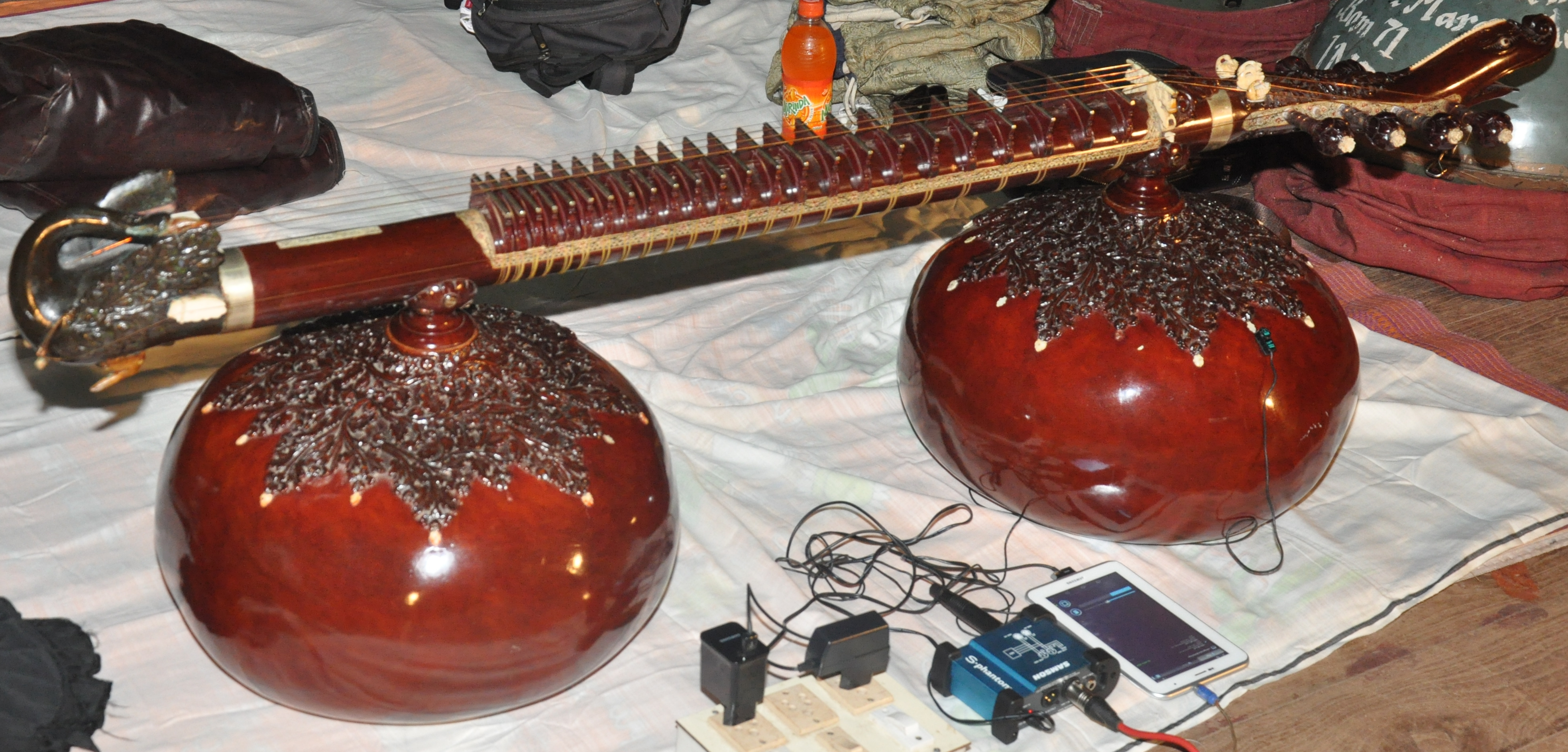
Dagar-vani rudra veena, showing the frets, dandi, carved peacock and makara, and tumbas

The rudra veena has twenty-one to twenty-four moveable frets (parda) on top of the dandi. These frets are made of thin plates of brass with flat tops but curved wooden bases to match the shape of the dandi, each about two to four centimeters (0.75–1.5 inches) high. While these frets were once attached to the instrument with wax, contemporary veena players use waxed flax ties to attach the frets. This allows for players to adjust the frets to the individual microtones (shruti) of a raga. By pulling the string up or down alongside the fret, the veena player can bend the pitch (meend) by as much as a fifth.

A modern rudra veena has a total of seven or eight strings: four main melody strings, two or three chikari strings (which are used in rhythmic sections of the rag to delineate or emphasize the pulse, or taal), and one drone (laraj) string. These strings are made of steel or bronze, and run from the pegs (and over the nut if coming from the pegbox) down to the peacock, passing over the jawari near the peacock. A rudra veena will have three jawari; a main one covering an opening on the hollow peacock, and two smaller ones on the sides of the peacock, supporting the chikari and drone strings. These jawari and other strings supports are traditionally made of Sambar stag antler; however, India has banned trade in Sambar deer antler since 1995, due to the deer's declining population and vulnerable status. Strings are tuned by turning the ebony pegs to tighten or loosen the strings; the antler string supports can be moved for fine tuning.

Unlike European stringed instruments, where strings are almost always tuned to the same notes on all instruments—a modern cello, for example, will usually have its open strings tuned to C_{2} (two octaves below middle C), followed by G_{2}, D_{3}, and then A_{3}—the rudra veena follows Hindustani classical practice of a movable root note or tonic (moveable do). The four melody strings are tuned to the ma a fifth below the tonic; the tonic (sa); the pa a fifth above the tonic; and the sa an octave above the tonic. Thus, if the lowest ma string was tuned to D_{2}, then the four melody strings would be tuned to D_{2}, A_{2}, E_{3}, and A_{3}; if the lowest ma string was instead tuned to B♭_{1}, then the four melody strings would be tuned to B♭_{1}, F_{2}, C_{3}, and F_{3}

== History ==
Its origin is undated; however the instrument is known to be ancient enough and is linked to Shiva. The rudra veena declined in popularity in part due to the introduction in the early 19th century of the surbahar, which allowed sitarists to more easily present the alap sections of slow dhrupad-style ragas. In the 20th century, Zia Mohiuddin Dagar modified and redesigned the rudra veena to use bigger gourds, a thicker tube (dandi), thicker steel playing strings (0.45–0.47 mm) and closed javari that. This produced a soft and deep sound when plucked without the use of any plectrum (mizrab). The instrument was further modified as the shruti veena by Lalmani Misra to establish Bharat's Shadja Gram and obtain the 22 shrutis.

== Gallery ==
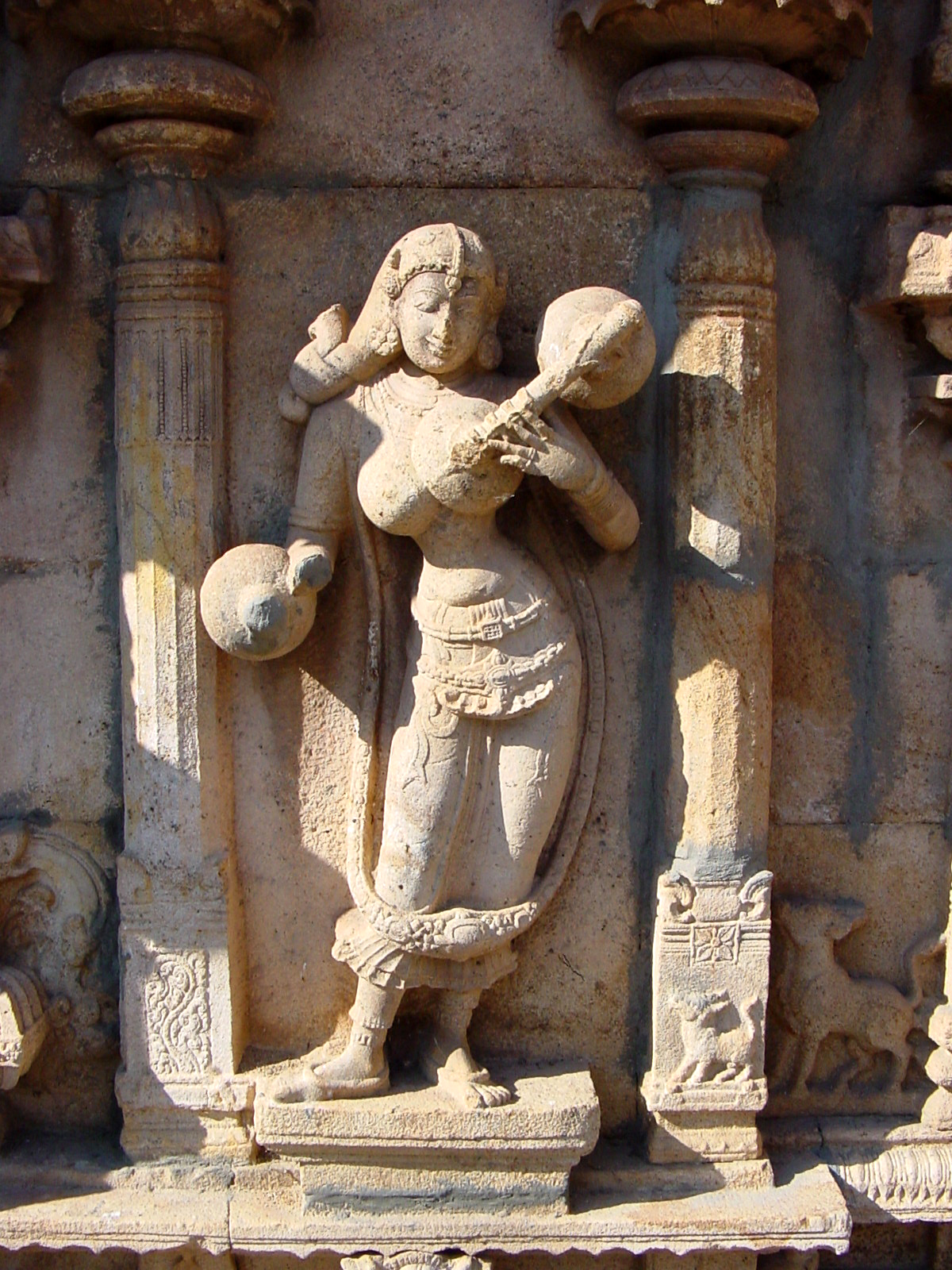
Maiden playing the vina. Venugopala Shrine of Ranganatha Temple, Srirangam. Early 17th century.

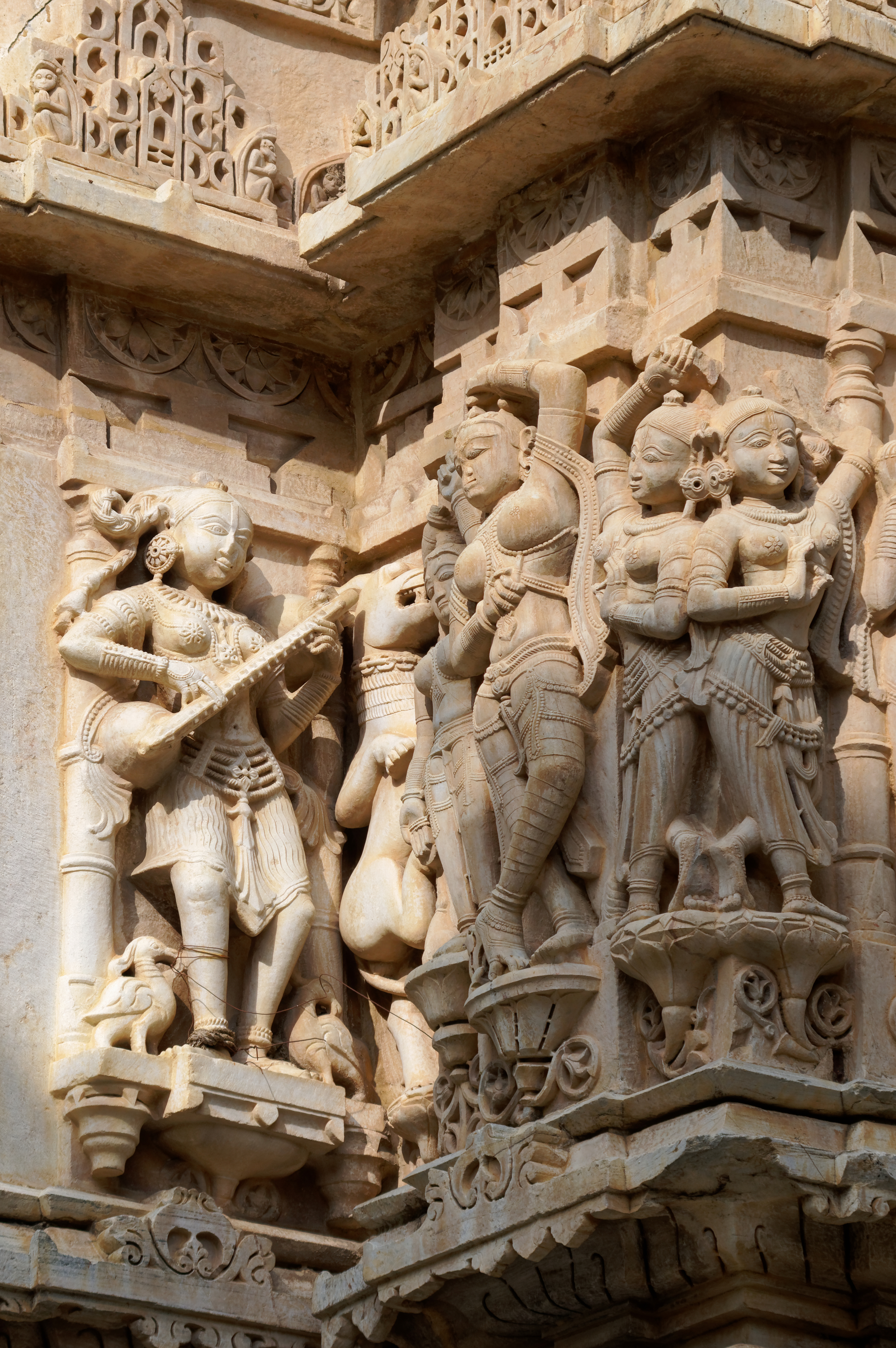
Jagdish Temple, Udaipur, 1651 A.D. Vina resembling rudra veena.

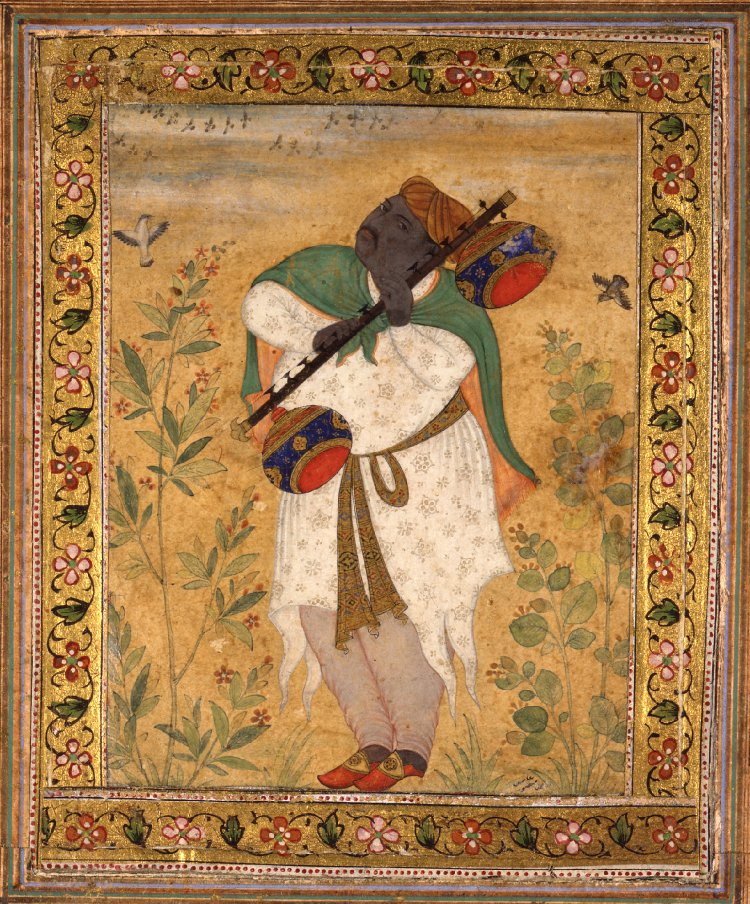
Ca. 1605. Portrait of Naubat Khan by Ustad Mansur, Mughal School ca. 1605, British Museum, London. The instrument is depicted with two strings.

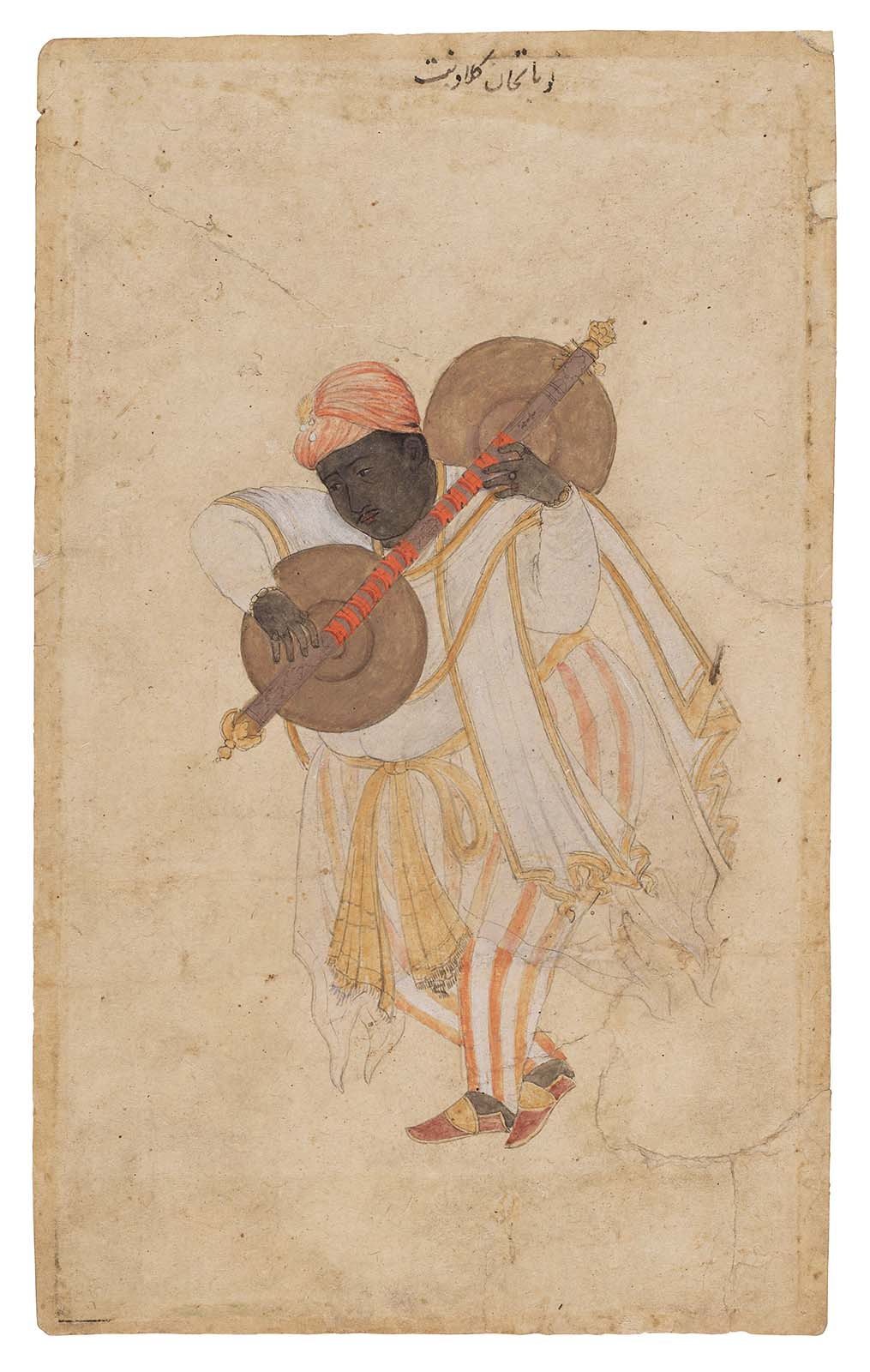
Naubat Khan Kalawant playing a three-stringed rudra veena.

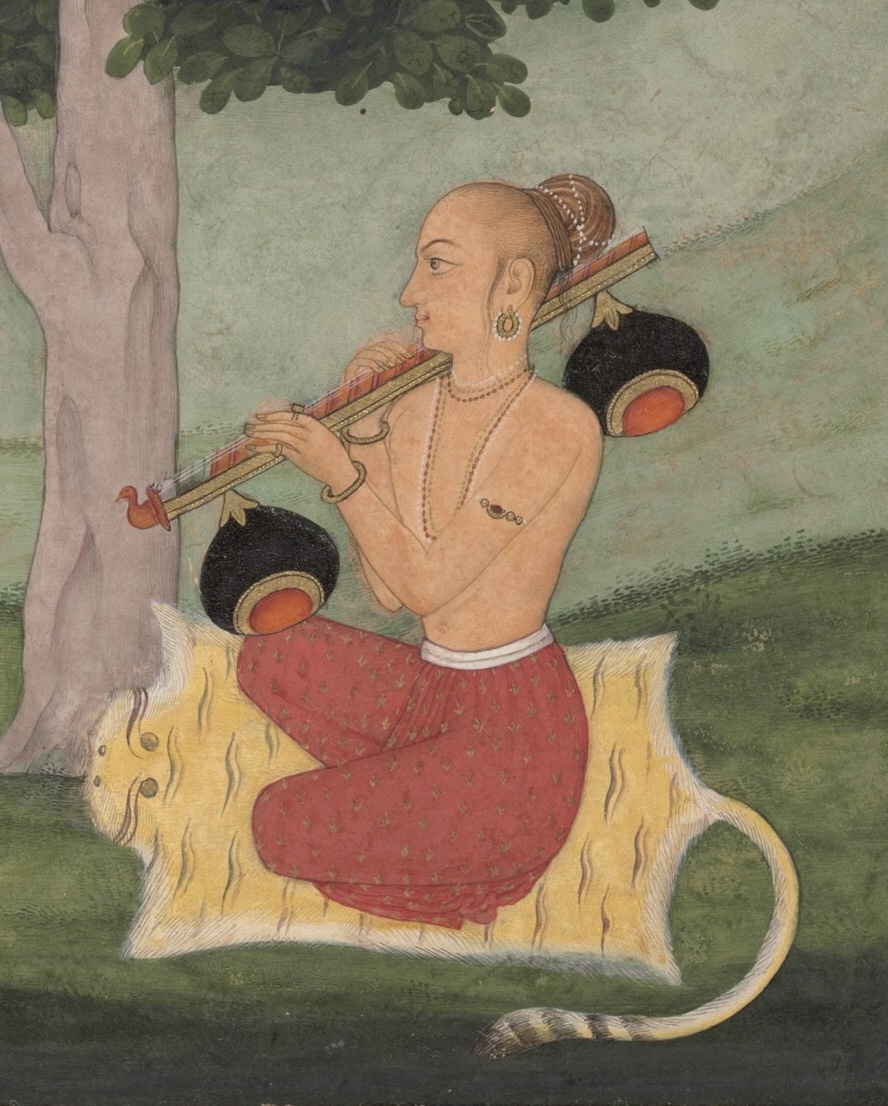
1690-1696 C.E. Man playing rudra veena

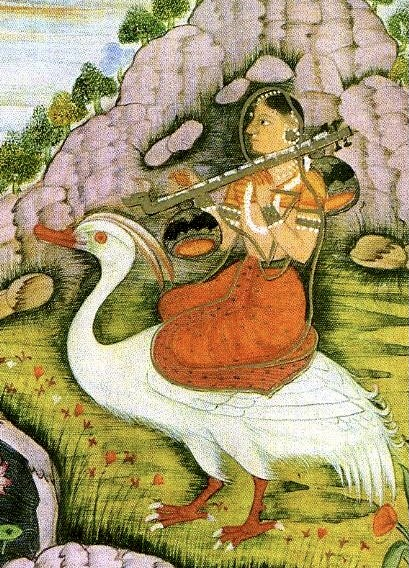
Ca. 1700. Saraswati riding a white bird and holding a northern style bīn (rudra vīnā). The instrument is depicted with four strings.

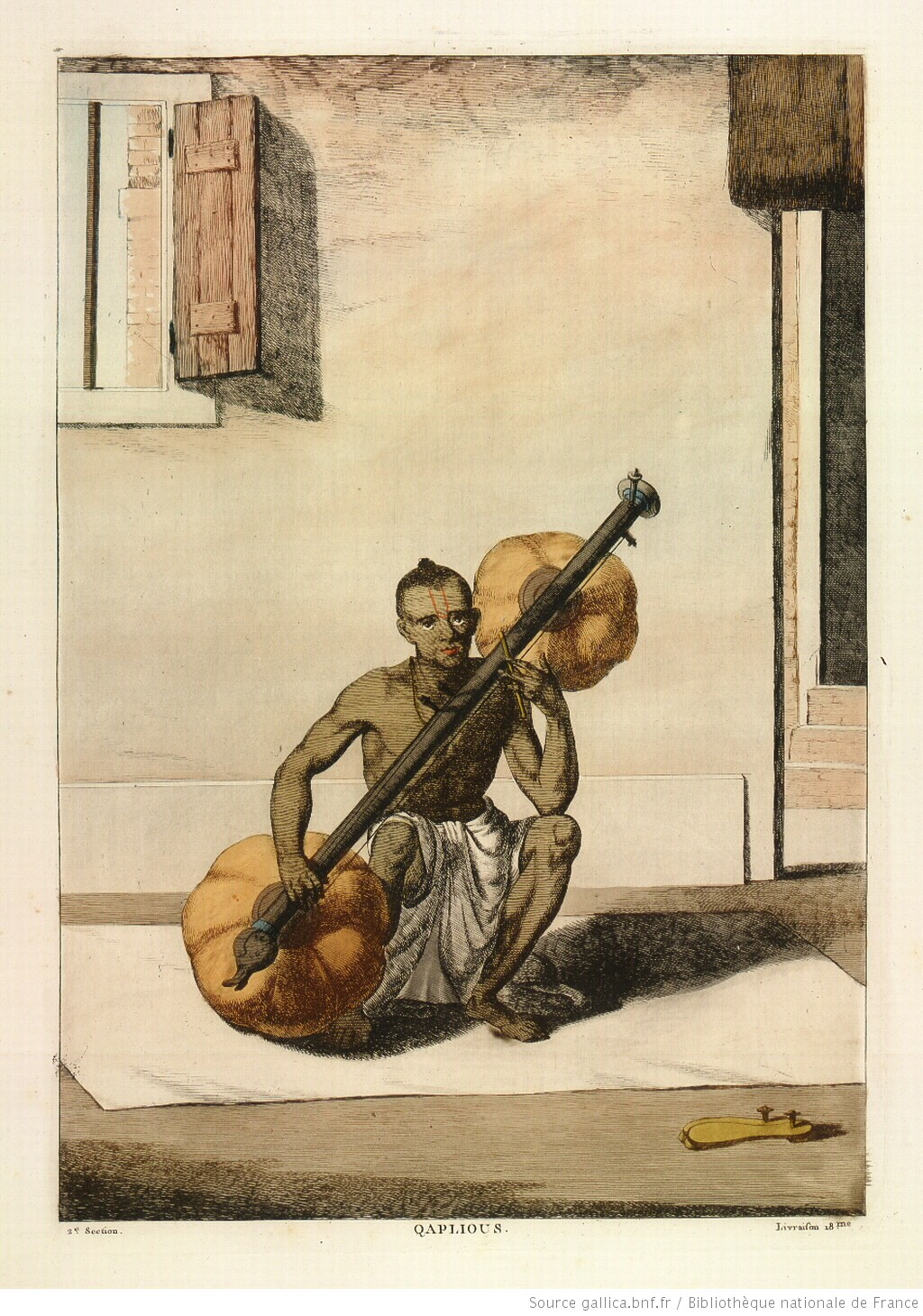
1808-1812. Illustration of a bīn, labeled "qaplious". At the time, the instrument illustrated was fretless; similar to the pinaka vina, it used a stick to slide on the string and choose notes.

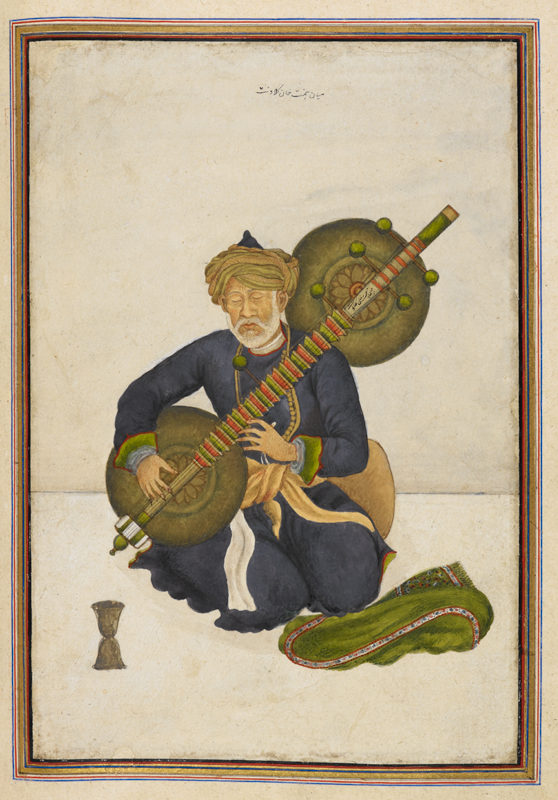
1825. Miyan Himmat Khan Kalawant playing a bin, page from the Tasrih al-aqvam. The bin has four main strings that could be fretted and two side strings.

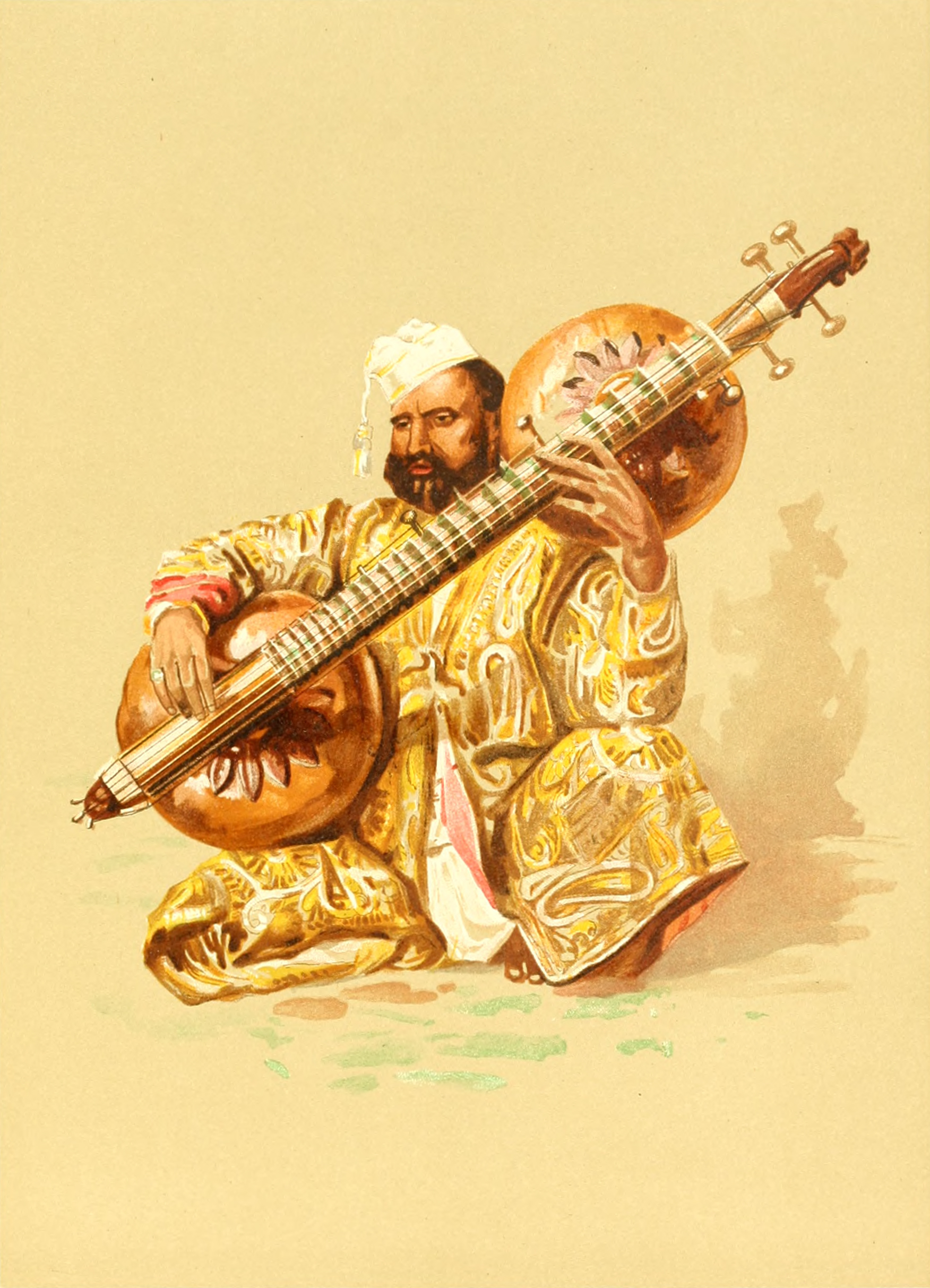
1891. A Bin Player, by William Gibb. The instrument depicted had four main strings that could be fretted and three side strings.

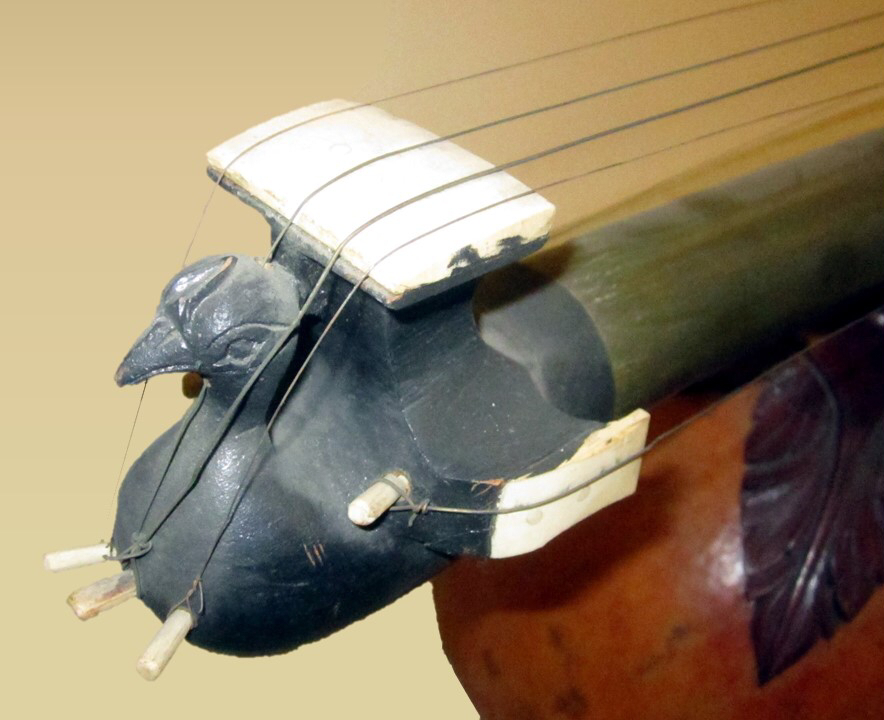
Bird on rudra veena, string holder.

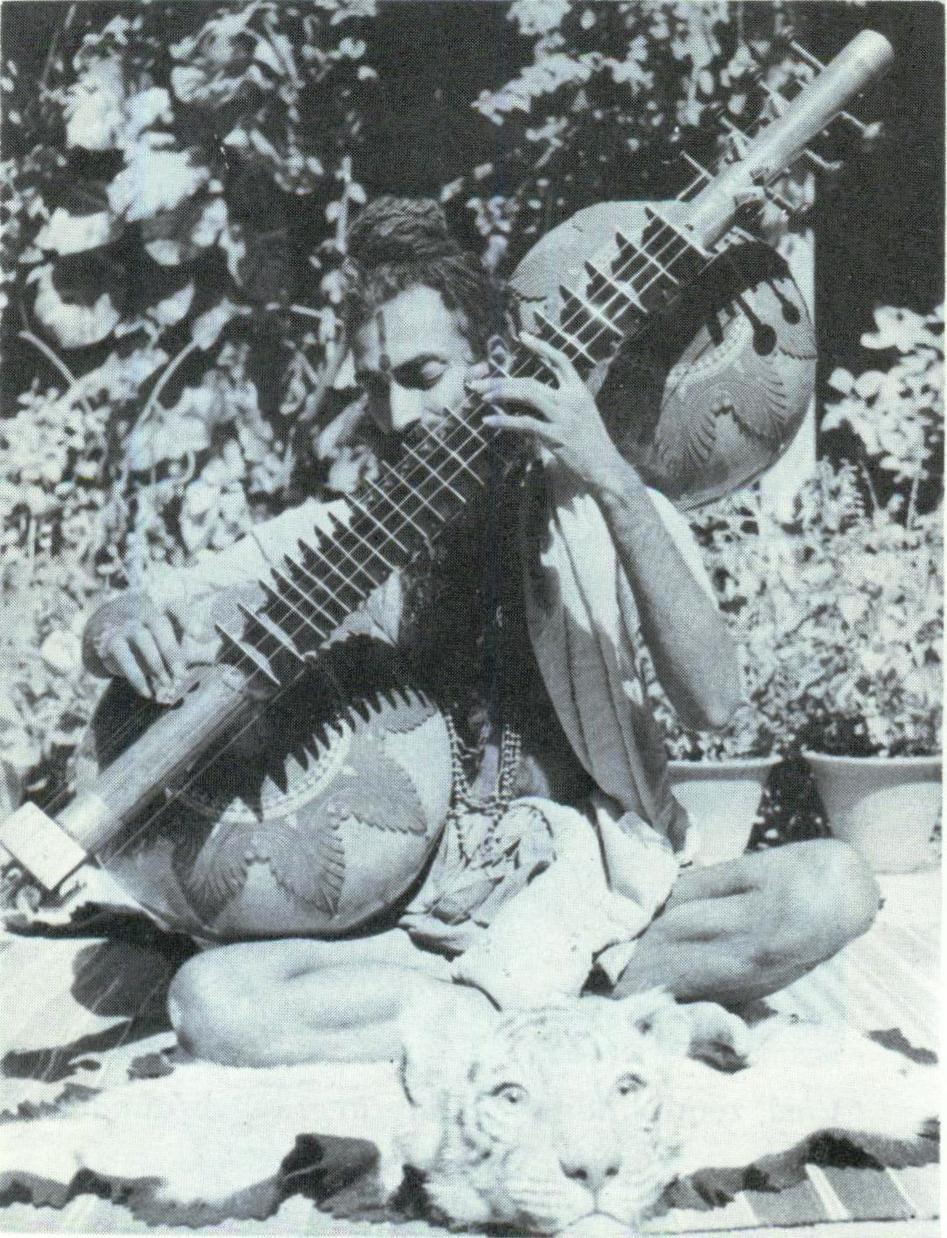
Veena Maharaj Dattatreya Rama Rao Parvatikar (1916–1990) playing the Rudra veena

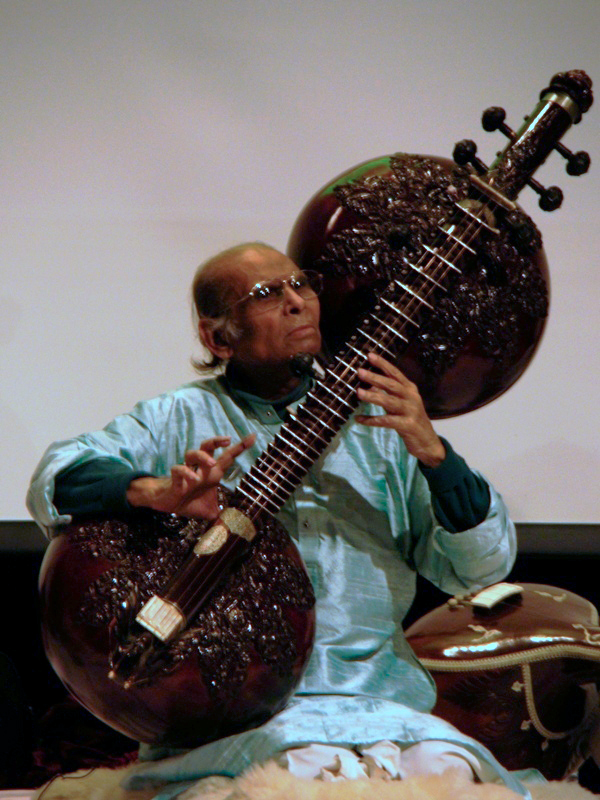
Ustad Asad Ali Khan playing the Rudra veena in traditional style

Video. A rudra veena or bīn is played by Mohi Baha'ud-din Dagar in dagarbani style.

== See also ==
- Mohan veena
