= Jyoti Hegde =

Vidushi Jyoti Hegde
- Born: 17 March 1963 (age 63); Sirsi, Karnataka, India
- Occupation: Musician
- Spouse: G.H. Hegde
- Children: 1
- Musical career
- Genres: indian classical; hindustani
- Instruments: Rudra Veena; Sitar
- Label: ASA Music (2012)
- Website: http://www.jyotihegde.com

Jyoti Hegde (Sanskrit: ज्योती हेग्डे, IPA: [dʑjoːtɪ ɦeːɡɖeː]) is a Rudra veena and sitar artist from the Khandarbani gharana. She has pursued music since age 12 and completed her master's in music from Karnatak University of Dharwad. Vidhushi Jyoti Hegde is the first woman player of Rudra veena in the world. She is a Grade-A artist of the Rudra veena and sitar with the All India Radio and regularly sought after for concerts.

== Career/History ==
Jyoti Hegde was born and brought up in Sirsi – the largest town in North Kanara district of Karnataka. She started learning music when she was 12. At the age of 16 years, she began to learn Rudra veena under the guidance of her first teacher Pandit Late Bindu Madhav Pathak. She was also a disciple of Rudra Veena maestro Ustad Asad Ali Khan.

== Personal life ==
She is married to G.S. Hegde and has a son.

== Discography ==
- Rare Instruments - Rudra Veena (ASA Music, 2012)

== Awards and recognition ==
Jyoti Hegde has won awards such as the Naada Nidhi award, Kala Chetana and Dhrupadmani.
