= Carsten Wicke =

- Born: Germany
- Genres: Hindustani classical music
- Occupation: Musician
- Instrument: Rudra Veena
- Website: rudraveena.net

Carsten Wicke is a Rudra Veena player of German origin who lives in India. He studied North Indian classical music with several master musicians since the 1990s, after learning western violin and vocal music as a child.

== Musical tradition ==
His journey into Indian music started while learning India's popular percussion instrument tabla with the most tabla maestro Pandit Anindo Chatterjee in Kolkata. Being fascinated by the old classical Dhrupad music Wicke met rudra veena master Padma Bhushan Ustad Asad Ali Khan, whose musical family tradition goes back over many generations, including Beenkars (veena players) like Sadiq Ali Khan, Musharraf Khan, and Rajab Ali Khan. Ustad Asad Ali Khan accepted him as one of his few veena disciples and taught him traditional rudra veena in the Khandarbani style. Wicke also studied Dagarbani Dhrupad with Ashish Sankrityayan, the current director and teacher at the Dhrupad Kendra in Bhopal.

== Performer ==
Carsten Wicke is one of the few international rudra veena performers today. His Raga presentation unites the meditative depth in the Alap (introduction) – the fortitude of the Dagarbani Dhrupad – with the dynamic interpretation of the faster performance stages (Jor, Jhala), a distinguished characteristic of the Khandarbani style. Combining subtle melodic variations with complex rhythmical finger stroke techniques his veena playing creates a listening experience that is appreciated by Indian music lovers as well as by the international audience.

== Instrument making ==
Being based in Kolkata, Carsten Wicke also develops and manufactures new veenas in collaboration with local craftsmen, not the least to counter the current shortage of instrument makers for rudra veenas in India.

== Media ==
As film-maker, author and media producer he documents Indian music traditions, particular the old-classical Dhrupad Music.
