= Asad Ali Khan =

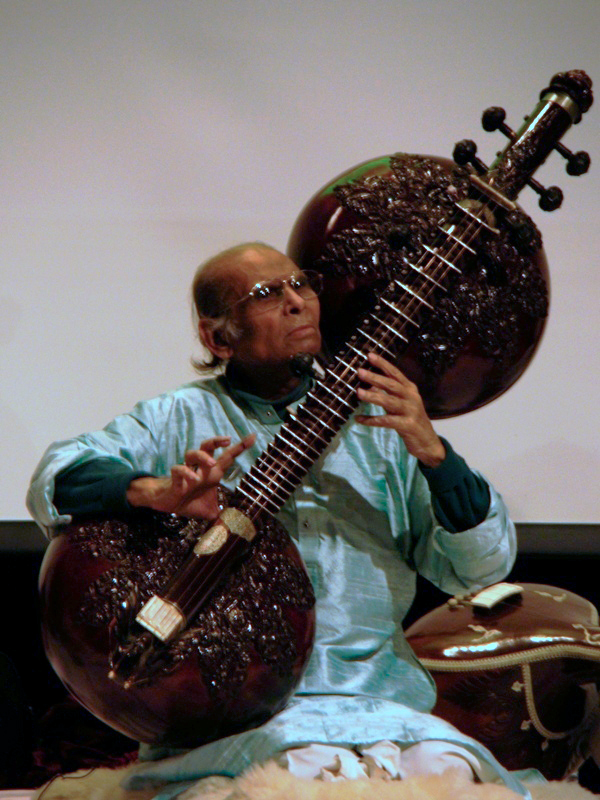
- Asad Ali Khan performs in 2009

Background information
- Born: 1 December 1937; Alwar, Indian Empire
- Died: 14 June 2011 (aged 73) New Delhi, India
- Genres: Hindustani classical music
- Instrument: rudra veena

Asad Ali Khan (1 December 1937 – 14 June 2011) was an Indian musician who played the plucked string instrument rudra veena. Khan performed in the style dhrupad and was described as the best living rudra veena player in India by The Hindu. He was awarded the Indian civilian honor Padma Bhushan in 2008.

== Life and career ==
Khan was born 1937 in Alwar in the seventh generation of rudra veena players in his family. His ancestors were royal musicians in the courts of Rampur, Uttar Pradesh, and Jaipur, Rajasthan in the 18th century. His great-grandfather Rajab Ali Khan was head of the court musicians in Jaipur and owned a village land holding. His grandfather Musharraf Khan (died 1909) was court musician in Alwar, and performed in London in 1886. Khan's father Sadiq Ali Khan worked as a musician for the Alwar court and for the Nawab of Rampur for 35 years. Khan grew up in a musical surrounding and was taught the Beenkar gharana (stylistic school of rudra veena playing) of Jaipur and vocals for fifteen years.

Khan was one of a few active musicians who played the rudra veena and the last surviving master of one of the four schools of dhrupad, the Khandar school. He performed in many countries, including Australia, the United States, Afghanistan, and Italy and several other European countries, and conducted music courses in the United States. Khan worked at All India Radio, taught the sitar in the Faculty of Music and Fine Arts at the University of Delhi for 17 years, and continued to train students privately after his retirement. Students of Khan who perform include his son Zaki Haidar, Carsten Wicke, Bikramjeet Das of Kolkata, Jyoti Hegde, and the vocalist, Madhumita Ray. Dr. Keshav Sharma from Shimla, India was also his disciple for many years who learnt Sitar and Dhrupad. Khan criticized the lack of willingness among Indians to study the rudra veena and had more foreign than Indian students. He was involved in preserving the playing of the instrument, which he believed to be created by the deity Shiva, and performed for SPIC MACAY, promoting Indian classical music to young Indians. Khan was a Shi'a Muslim.

Khan received several national awards, including the Sangeet Natak Akademi Award in 1977 and the civilian honor Padma Bhushan in 2008, which was awarded by Indian President Pratibha Patil. He was described as the best living rudra veena player in India by The Hindu and lived in Delhi.

== Death ==
Khan died on 14 June 2011 in the All India Institute of Medical Sciences in New Delhi.
