= Hindraj Divekar =

Pandit Hindraj Divekar
- Born: Digambar Shivaram Divekar; 4 December 1954; Pune, India
- Died: 19 April 2019 (aged 64)
- Occupations: musician; teacher; author; musicologist
- Years active: 1979-2019
- Musical career
- Genres: indian classical; hindustani
- Instruments: Rudra Veena; Sitar
- Website: http://www.hindrajdivekar.org

Pandit Hindraj Divekar (pronunciation:[hindɾədʒ diʋekəɾ] हिंदराज दिवेकर) (4 December 1954 – 19 April 2019) was a virtuoso of the Rudra Veena and Sitar. He teaches the been in both Dhrupad and Khayal styles. Pandit Hindraj is one of the very few surviving rudra veena players in the world. He is the co-author of the book, Rudra Veena: An Ancient String Musical Instrument. He is the founder director of Hindgandharva Sangeet Academy, Pune.

== Career ==
Pandit Hindraj started his Sitar training from his father, Late Pandit Hindagandharva Shivarambuwa Divekar, and from Pandit Bhaskar Chandawarkar in 1973. He received guidance also from late Pandit Mangal Prasad (Ujjain) and from Abdul Halimjafar Khan.

He received his training on Rudra Veena, for both Dhrupad and Khayal styles, primarily from his father and later from Pandit Pandharinathji Kolhapure and Zia Mohimuddin Dagar. For Khayal style in rudra veena, he has sought guidance from Pandit Bindu Madhav Pathak.

Since 1979, he has performed many concerts throughout India and abroad (Australia, Germany, Italy, Singapore). He got his music degree of Sangeet Visharad in 1985, from Bhaskar Sangeet Vidayala, Bharat Gayan Samaj, Pune.

Pandit Hindraj is also the co-author of the book,- Rudra Veena: An Ancient String Musical Instrument, published in 2001. He worked as a lecturer in the Department of Hindustani Music, Spicer Memorial College, Pune, and he is the founder director of Hindgandharva Sangeet Academy, Pune.

== Personal life ==
Pandit Hindraj Divekar was born as Digambar Shivaram Divekar into a family of musicians, on 4 December 1954 in Pune, India. His father Late Pandit Hindagandharva Shivarambuwa Divekar was a vocalist, rudra veena player and Marathi stage actor, who had been honored by Morarji Desai, fourth prime minister of India, at Pune in 1978. Pandit Hindraj Divekar's grandfather, Natashrestha Chintoba Divekar, was a singer and actor of Marathi stage and drama, and had been honored by Jawaharlal Nehru first prime minister of India, in 1954.

He got his graduation in Commerce from Pune University in 1976.

== Discography ==
- Santirnadah : Sound of Silence (Sravan Music,2013) - album of 15 CDs with 30 raagas rendered through rudra veena and sitar.

== Honors and recognition ==
He has been presented with various titles and honours, some of which are

- title Surmani by Sur Singar Samsad in 1980
- title Pandit in 1988
- title Sangeet Shree, at Allahabad Music Festival, 1988
- title Dhrupad Shree at Dhrupad Festival, Indore, 1991
- title Pune Gaurav by Pune Municipal Corporation, 1994
