= Bindu Madhav Pathak =

- Born: 9 April 1935
- Died: 4 February 2004 (aged 68); Hubli, Karnataka, India
- Occupations: musician; teacher; author; musicologist
- Children: 3
- Musical career
- Genres: Indian classical; Hindustani
- Instruments: Rudra veena; Sitar

Bindu Madhav Pathak (Sanskrit: बिन्दु माधव् पाथक्, IPA: [bɪndʊ maːdʱɐ paːtʰɐk]) was an exponent of rudra veena and Sitar. He played Khayal style (Kirana type) of music on been. He was an 'A' grade artist of All India Radio. Some of his famous students are Hindraj Divekar, Shrikant Pathak, Ramchandra V Hegde and Jyoti Hegde. He was a recipient of several awards and titles, including the Karnataka Kala Tilak Award, Sri Kanak Purandhar Prashasti, Arya Bhata Award, and "Vidyaparipoorna" title. Pathak retired as the Head of the Department of Music of Karnatak University. He died at 68 on 4 February 2004.

== Early life ==
Pathak was the son of a veteran rudra veena player Pt. Datto Pant Pathak and hailed from Hubli, Karnataka. He obtained his early training from his father and later from Rajab Ali Khan of Dewas. He became an accomplished artist at a very young age of 17.

== Personal life ==
Pathak died on 4 February 2004. He was survived by his wife, two sons, and a daughter.

== Career ==
Major accomplishments of Pathak include:

=== Educational qualifications ===
- M.A. – Music
- M.A. – English
- M.A. – Hindi
- C.C. – French
- Ph.D. – Music

=== Awards ===
- He was awarded by the Karnataka State Nrutya Academy, Bangalore, with a title "Karnataka Kala Tilak".
- He is also a recipient of the Sri Kanak Purandhar Prashasti, a top most and prestigious award given by the government of Karnataka.
- He has also got the "Arya Bhat Award", with the title "Sangeet Vidya Prapurna".

=== Publications ===
- Book – Bharatiya Sangeeta Charitre (Kannada), published by Karnatak University, Dharwad
- Book – Dr. Puttaraj Gawai, published by Sangeet Natya Academy, Bangalore

=== Research articles and papers ===
He has published several articles and research papers on music, in English, Hindi and Kannada magazines

=== Positions held ===
- Head of the Dept. of Music, in M.M. Arts and Science college, Sirsi (1963–1980)
- Musicologist and Research guide in music and Chairman of Post Graduate school of Music in Karnatak University, Dharwad ( 1981–1995)
- Member – Karnataka State Sangeet Nrutya, Music Syllabus Committee (Kala Academy, Panjim, Goa), Board of Studies in music (Karnatak university), Academic Council (Karnatak university), Indian Music Congress (West Bengal), Indian Musicological Society (Baroda), Director – Regional Centre of Research and Development (Karnataka State Sangeet Natya Academy, Hubli)
- Guide in Music, Dept. of Culture, Ministry of Education and Culture, Government of India, New Delhi
- Guide for Ph.D in the Dept. of Music, Karnatak University, Dharwad
