= Pinaka veena =

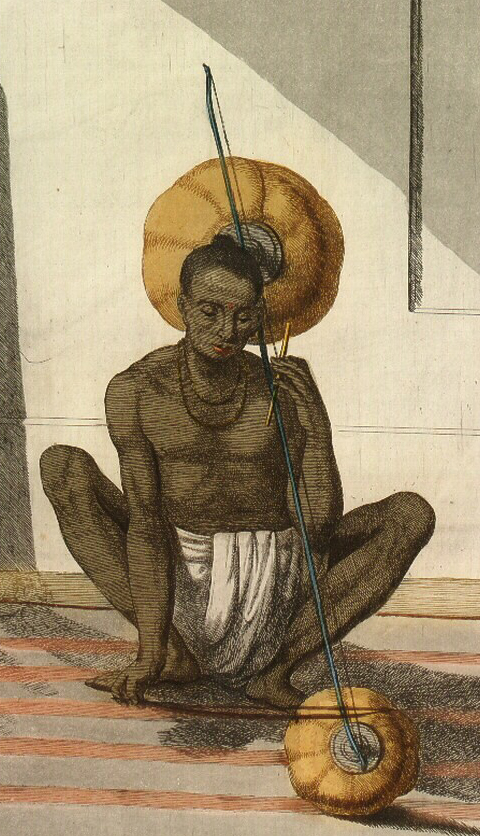
Pinak, a bowed musical bow.

Pinak vs bīn, 1810

"The essential difference between this instrument and the been is that, in the place of chords it has but one string of wire, strongly stretched. To draw out the sound, a bow like that of a bass is prest upon this chord, at the same time that another part of it is struck or rubbed with a little stick.

— Frans Balthazar Solvyns,

The pināka vīnā (Hindi: पिनाक pinnak + Hindi: वीणा veena) was an Indian musical instrument, a musical bow that was itself played with a bow. It has also been transliterated pinaki vina and pinak.

It appeared similar to the rudra veena (also called "bīn" or "been"), with a long bar held over the musician's shoulder and resting on the ground, with large gourds attached at each end for resonators. However, where the rudra veena has multiple strings and frets, the pinaka vina had only one string made of wire and no frets. Where the rudra veena was a stick zither (with a straight and rigid bar for the instrument's body), the pinaka vīnā was a musical bow (its body a long stick turned up at each end).

The instrument was sounded with a bow. The musician chose notes with a stick held against the strings, able to slide it up and down on the string, in the same way a bottle slides on a slide guitar's strings.

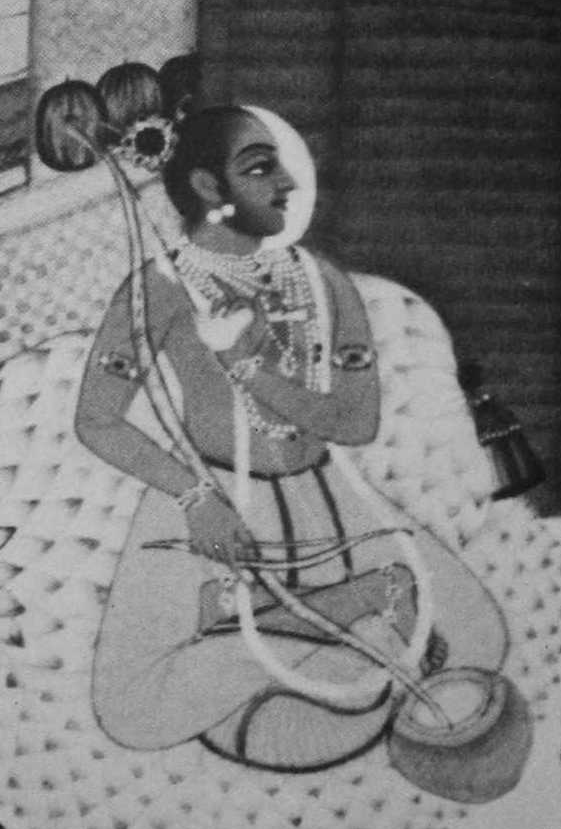
Ragaputra Sarang painting, from Bundi, showing "The Divine Musician plays a pinaki vīnā."

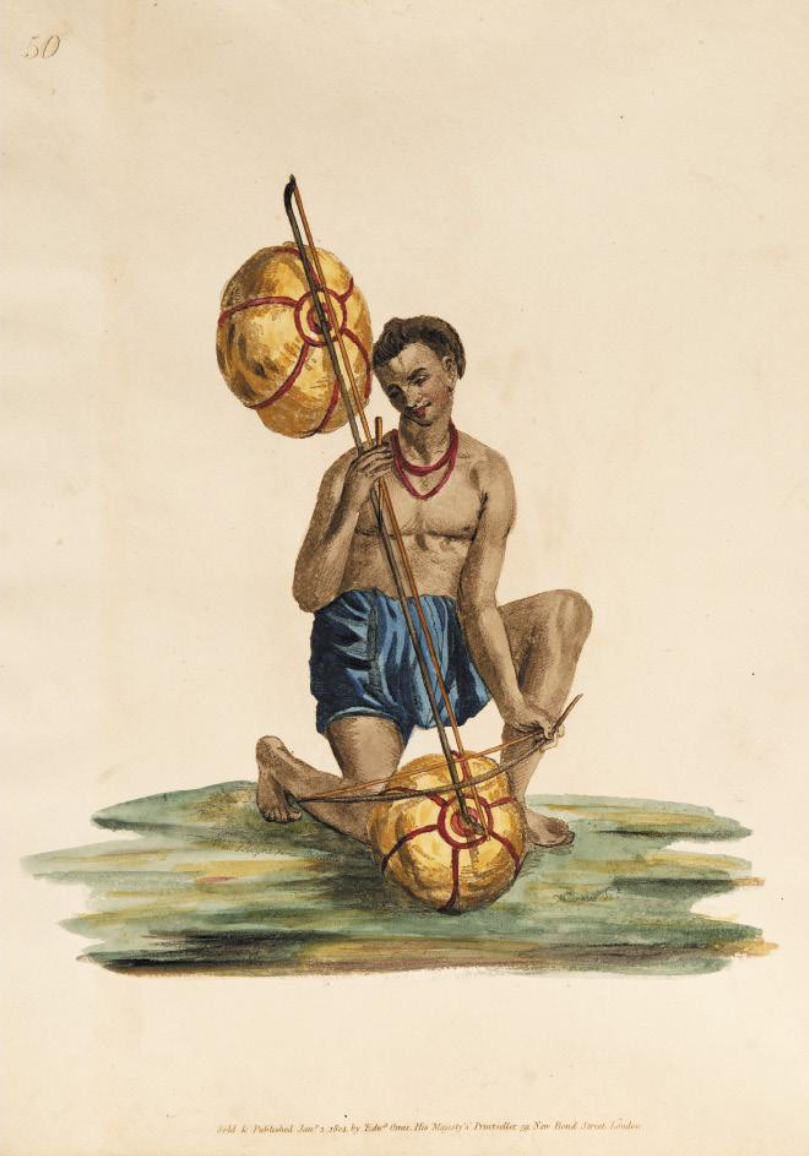
India, 1807. Pinak, a bowed musical bow.

== Origins ==
Pinaka was the name of the bow (arrow-shooting variety) of Shiva. The musical bow pināka made it into literature by the 12th century C.E. in the Saraswati Hridayalankar or Bharatbhashya by Nanyadeva (1097–1133 C.E.) In the mid-12th century it was considered to be a very important instrument by Haripala, a Gujarati king (son of Karna). The instrument was recorded in 1456 as having a second resonator. By 1810 the instrument was rare, and much of our knowledge about its appearance comes from drawings made by Frans Balthazar Solvyns, an artist who illustrated many common scenes in the 1790s and early 1800s.

As the pinak was a northern instrument, a bowed southern instrument also existed, the ravanahatha stick zither. The pināka and ravanahatha are tied together in literature. As pināka was Shiva's bow, the ravanahatha was created in legend by the ascetic demon king Ravana, a devotee of Shiva.
