= Kailasanathar Temple, Kanchipuram =

Hindu temple in Tamil Nadu, India

Kailasanathar Temple Kailasanatha Temple
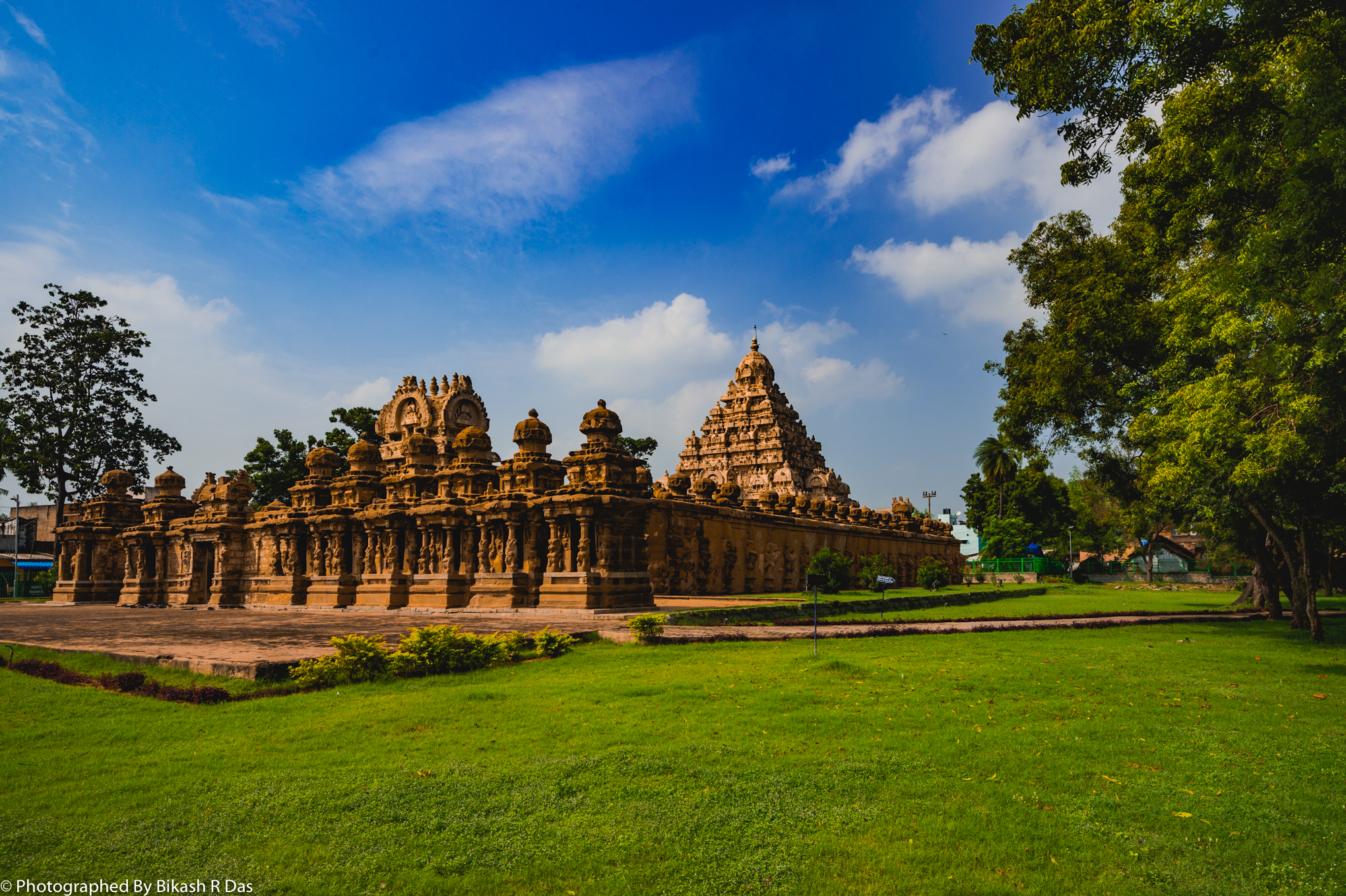

- Location within India Location within Tamil Nadu

Religion
- Affiliation: Hinduism
- District: Kanchipuram District
- Deity: Shiva

Location
- Location: Kanchipuram
- State: Tamil Nadu
- Country: India
- Coordinates: 12°50′32.3″N 79°41′22.8″E

Architecture
- Creator: Narasimhavarman II (Pallava dynasty)
- Completed: c. 700 CE (with later additions)

The Kailasanathar Temple, Kanchipuram, also referred to as the Kailasanatha temple, is a Pallava-era historic Hindu temple in Kanchipuram, Tamil Nadu, India. Dedicated to Shiva, it is one of the oldest surviving monuments in Kanchipuram. It reflects a Dravidian architecture and was built around 700 CE by Narasimhavarman II with additions by Mahendravarman III. A square-plan temple, it has a mukha-mandapa (entrance hall), a maha-mandapa (gathering hall) and a primary garbha-griya (sanctum) topped with a four-storey vimana. The main sanctum is surrounded by nine shrines, seven outside and two inside flanking the entrance of the sanctum, all with forms of Shiva. The outer walls of the temple's prakara (courtyard) is also surrounded by cells.

The Kailasanathar temple is notable for its intricately carved galaxy of Hindu art in the late 7th- and early 8th-century Tamil tradition. These largely relate to Shaivism, yet also include significant number of themes from Vaishnavism, Shaktism and Vedic deities. The temple is also notable for one of the early and best specimens of Hindu mural art in Tamil Nadu. This is found in the inner walls of the courtyard cells. The murals are in a style that is also found in the Ajanta Caves, as well as in the historic paintings in the 8th-century Vaikunthaperumal temple, also in Kanchipuram. The temple walls have many inscriptions in early scripts, important to the epigraphical study of regional history and Tamil temple traditions.

The structure contains 58 small shrines which are dedicated to various forms of Shiva. These are built into niches on the inner face of the high compound wall of the circumambulatory passage. The temple is one of the most prominent tourist attractions of the city.

== Geography ==
The temple is located towards the west of Kanchipuram city, and is about 75 kilometres (47 mi) from Chennai. Its location, demarcated according to the religious faiths, is in one of two "Kanchis", the Shiva Kanchi; and the Vishnu Kanchi. The Kailasanathar Temple is one of several notable temples in Kanchipuram, the others being Ekambaranatha, Kachapeshwarar, Kamakshi Amman, Kumarakottam Temple, and Varadaraja Perumal.

== History ==
The Kailasanathar Temple (meaning: "Lord of Kailasa"), is built in the tradition of Smartha worship of Shiva, Vishnu, Devi, Surya (Sun), Ganesha and Kartikeya, in Hinduism.

Temple construction is credited to the Pallava dynasty, who had established their kingdom with Kanchipuram (also known as "Kanchi" or "Shiva Vishnu Kanchi") as the capital city, considered one of the seven sacred cities under Hinduism. In Kanchi, after the Pallavas expanded their territories to the north, west and south both within Tamil, Andhra and Kannada territories under Emperor Narasimhavarman I, they started expanding their capital city of Kanchipuram and built many temples of great magnificence. Among the two unique specimens of temple architecture of the period 640–730 CE are the Tiru Parameswara Vinnagaram, which is also known as the Vaikunta Perumal temple and the Kailasanathar Temple.

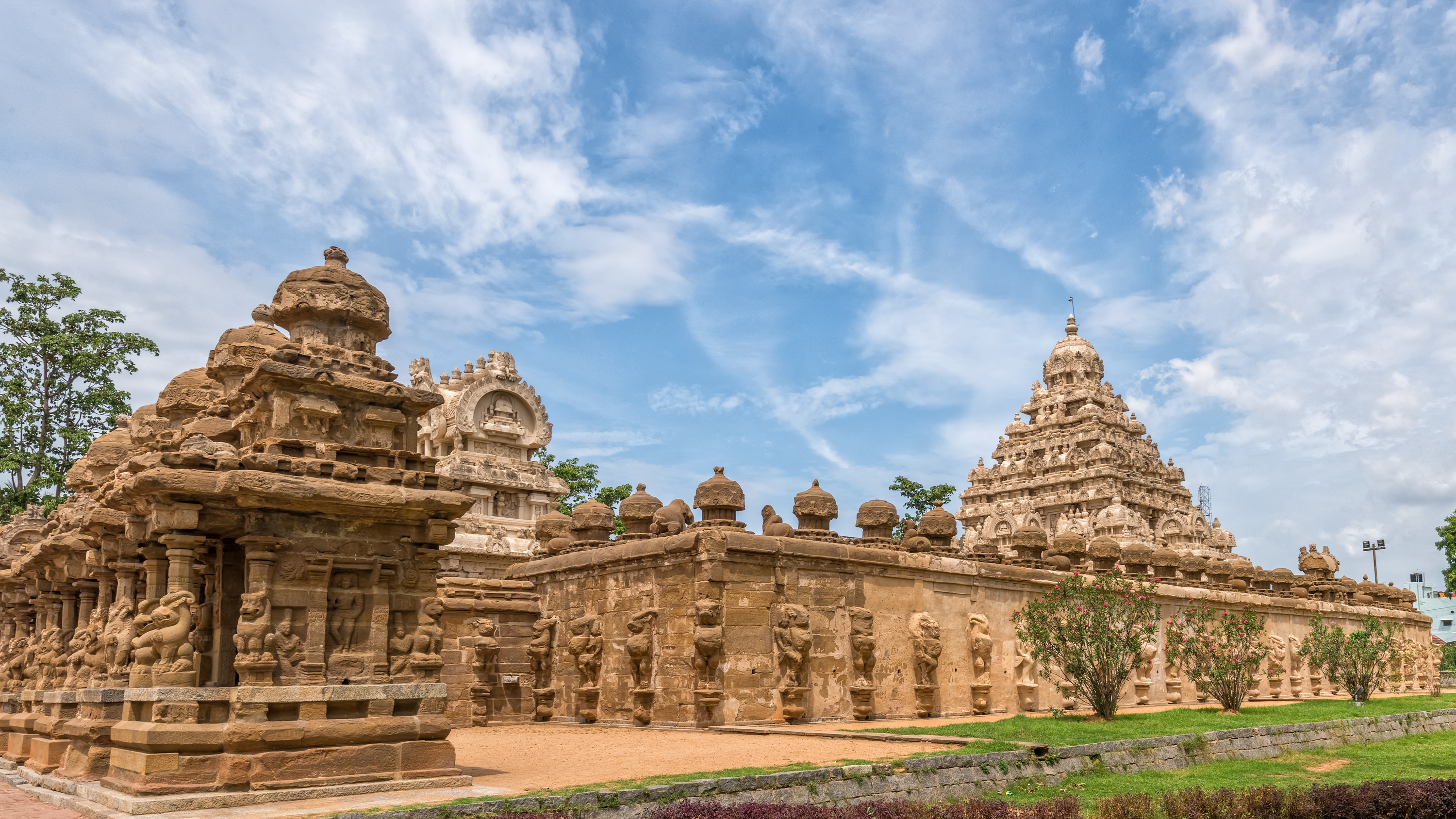
Outer view of the temple

The temple was built around 700 CE with additions in the 8th century and restorations in later centuries. It is the first structural temple built in South India by Narasimhavarman II (Rajasimha), also known as Rajasimha Pallaveswaram. His son, Mahendravarman III, completed the front façade and the gopuram (tower). Prior temples were either built of wood or hewn into rock faces in caves or on boulders, as seen in Mahabalipuram. The Kailasanathar temple became the trend setter for other similar temples in South India. According to local belief, the temple was a safe sanctuary for the rulers of the kingdom during wars. A secret tunnel, built by the kings, was used as an escape route and is still visible. It is believed that Raja Raja Chola I (985–1014 CE) visited the temple and drew inspiration from this temple to build the Brihadeeswara Temple.

Currently, Kanchi Kailasanathar Temple is maintained by Archaeological Survey of India.

== Architecture ==
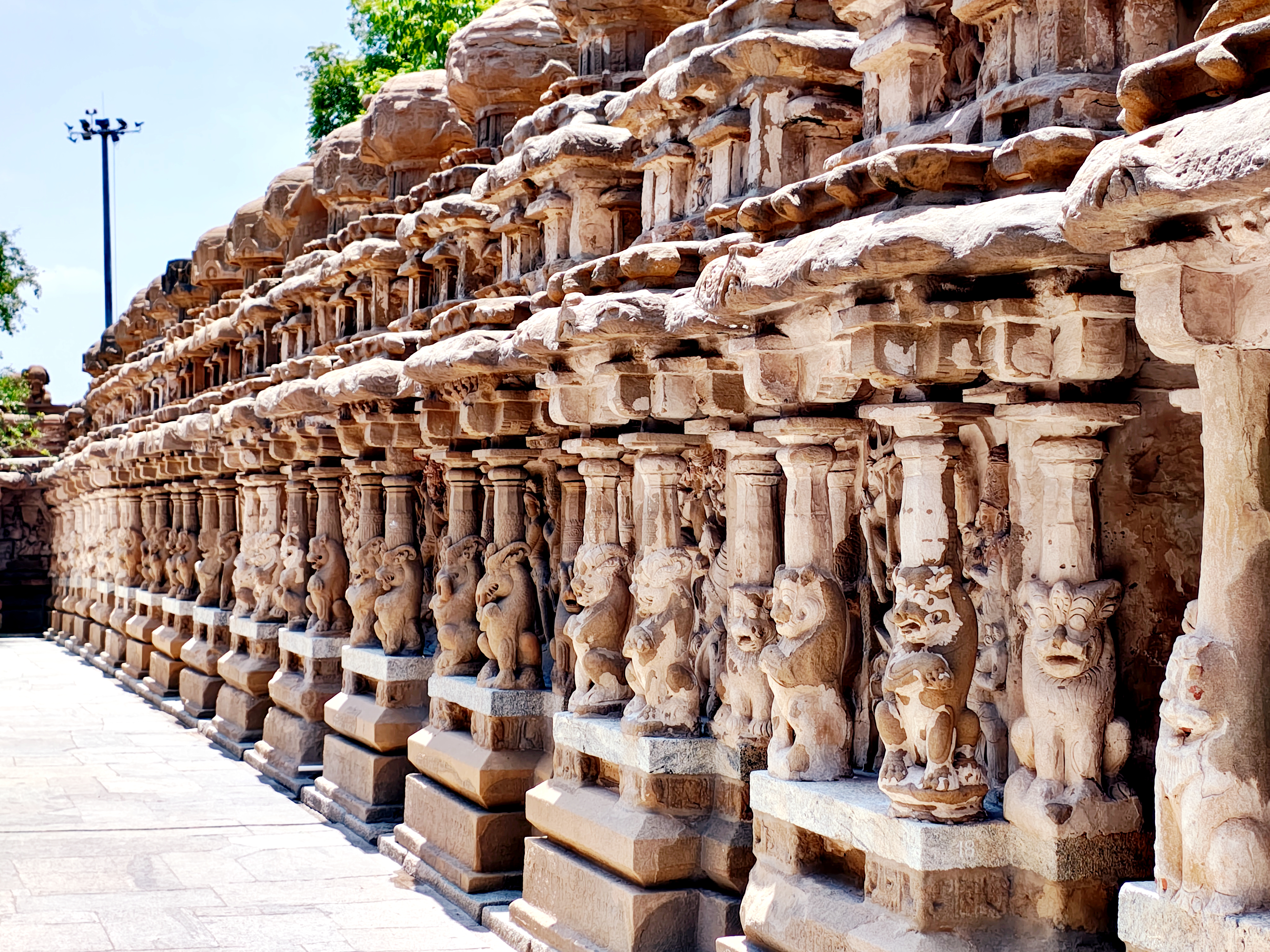
Kailasanathar Temple Architecture

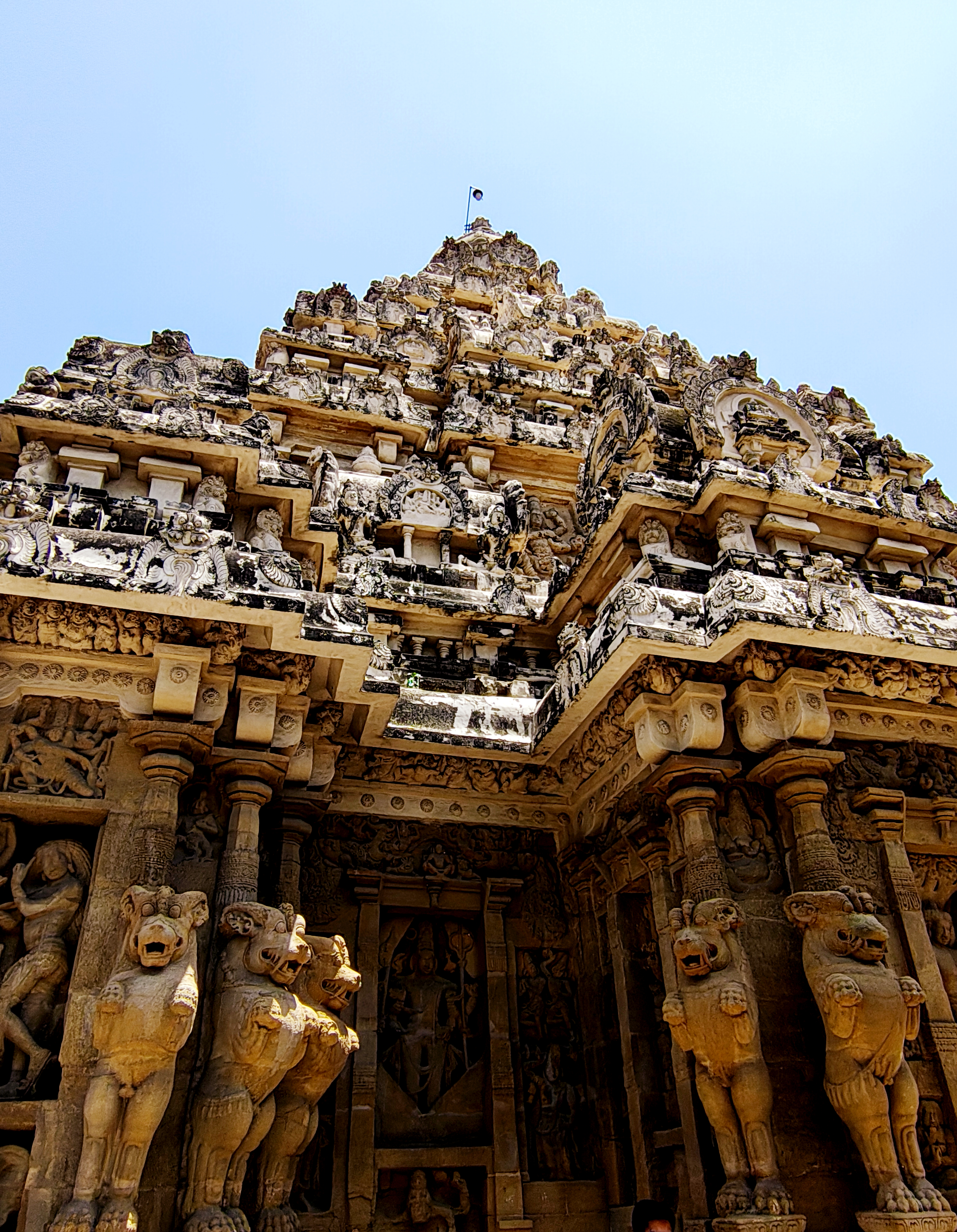
Kailasanathar Temple Gopuram

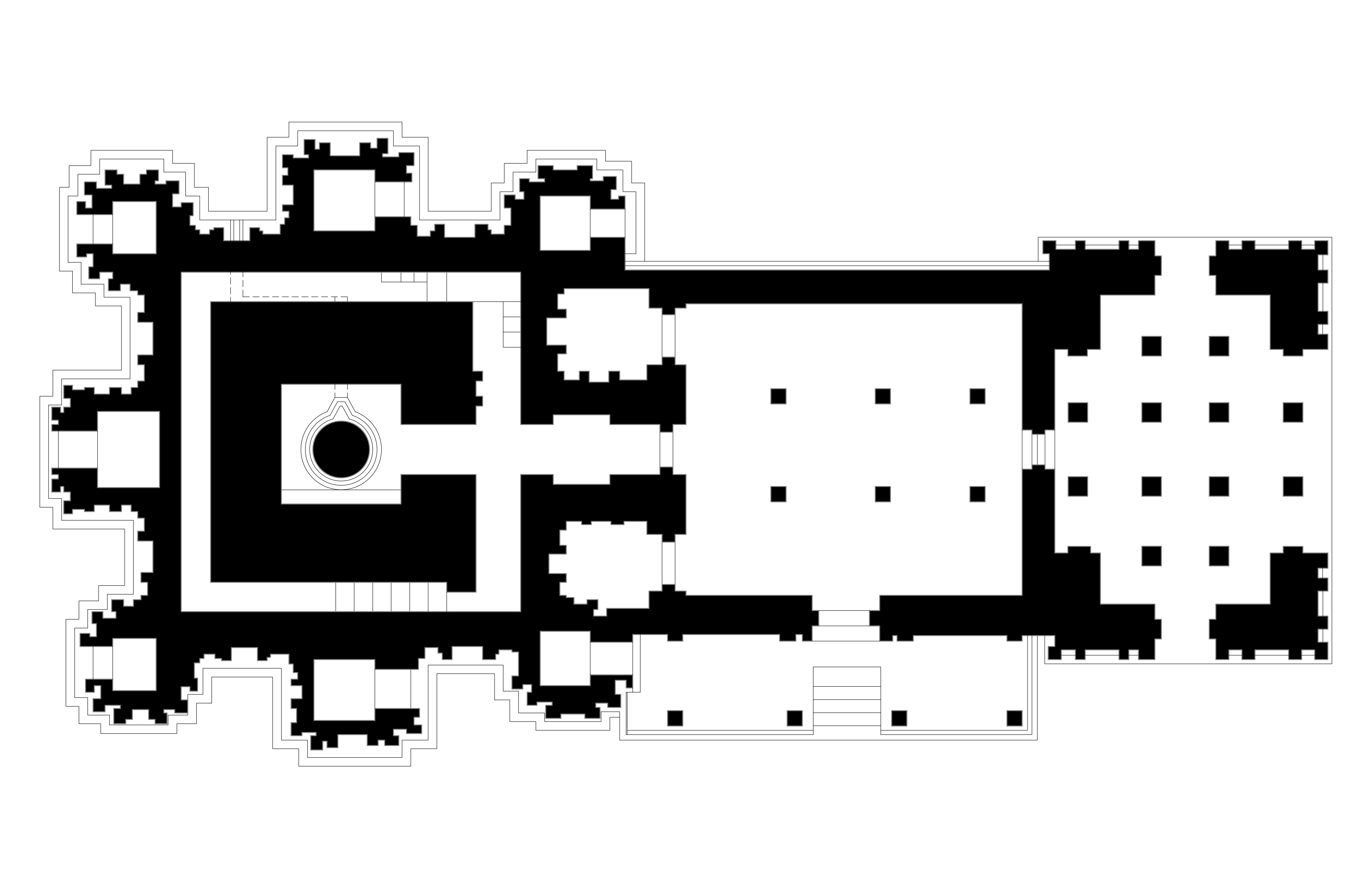
The floor plan of the Kailasanathar temple

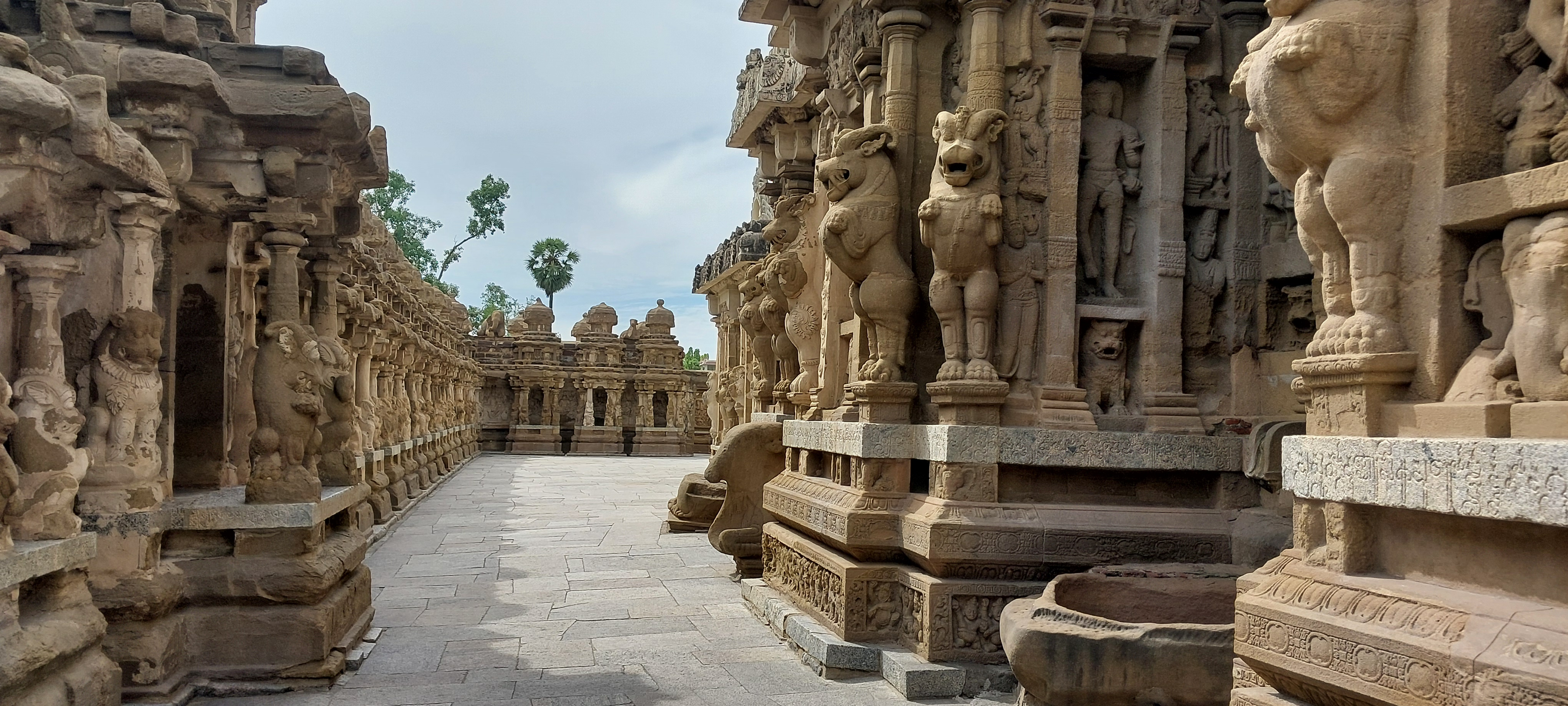
Inner court, or the circumambulatory passage, with 58 subshrines.

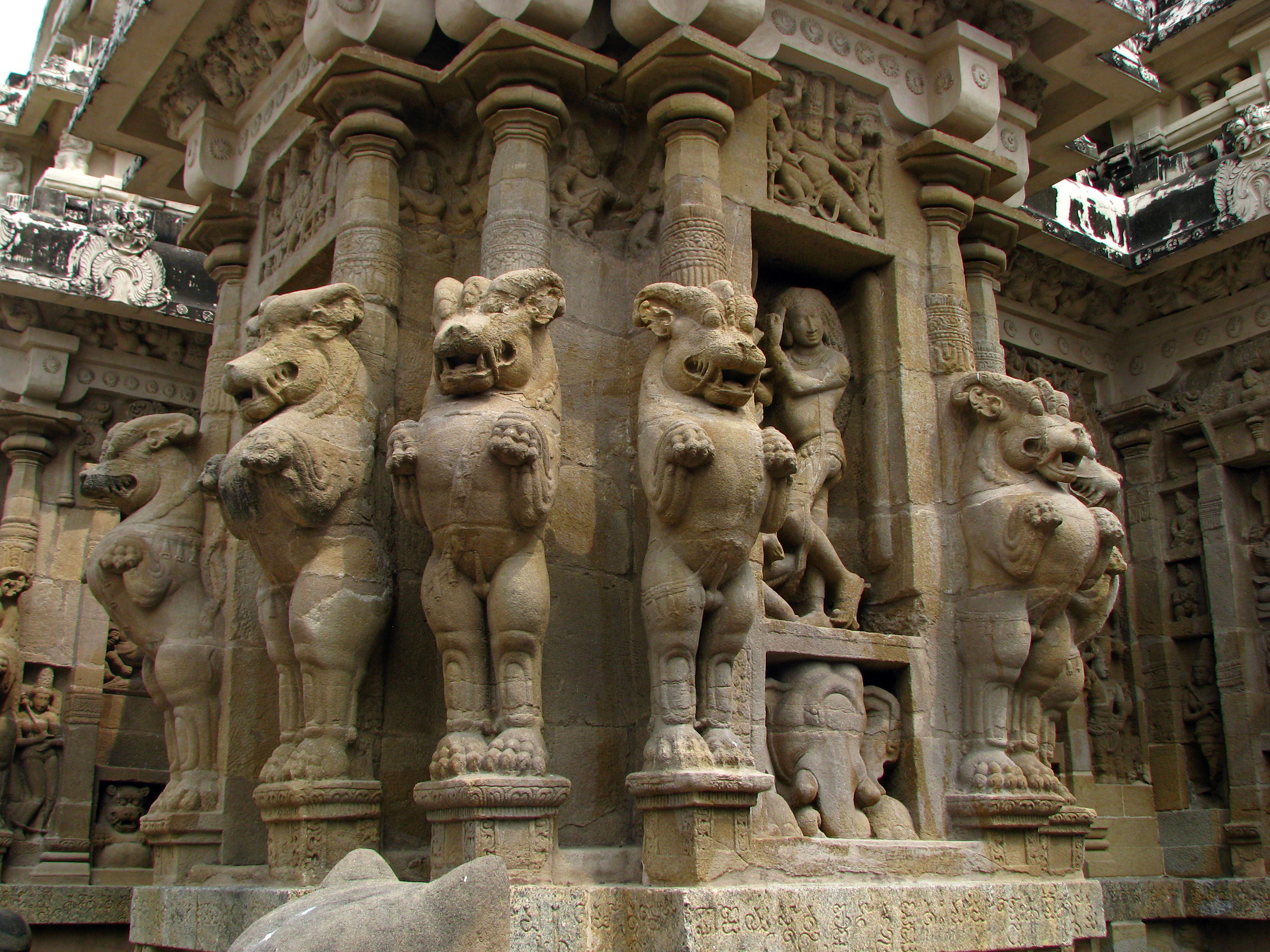
Typical pillar design with multi-directional mythical lions.

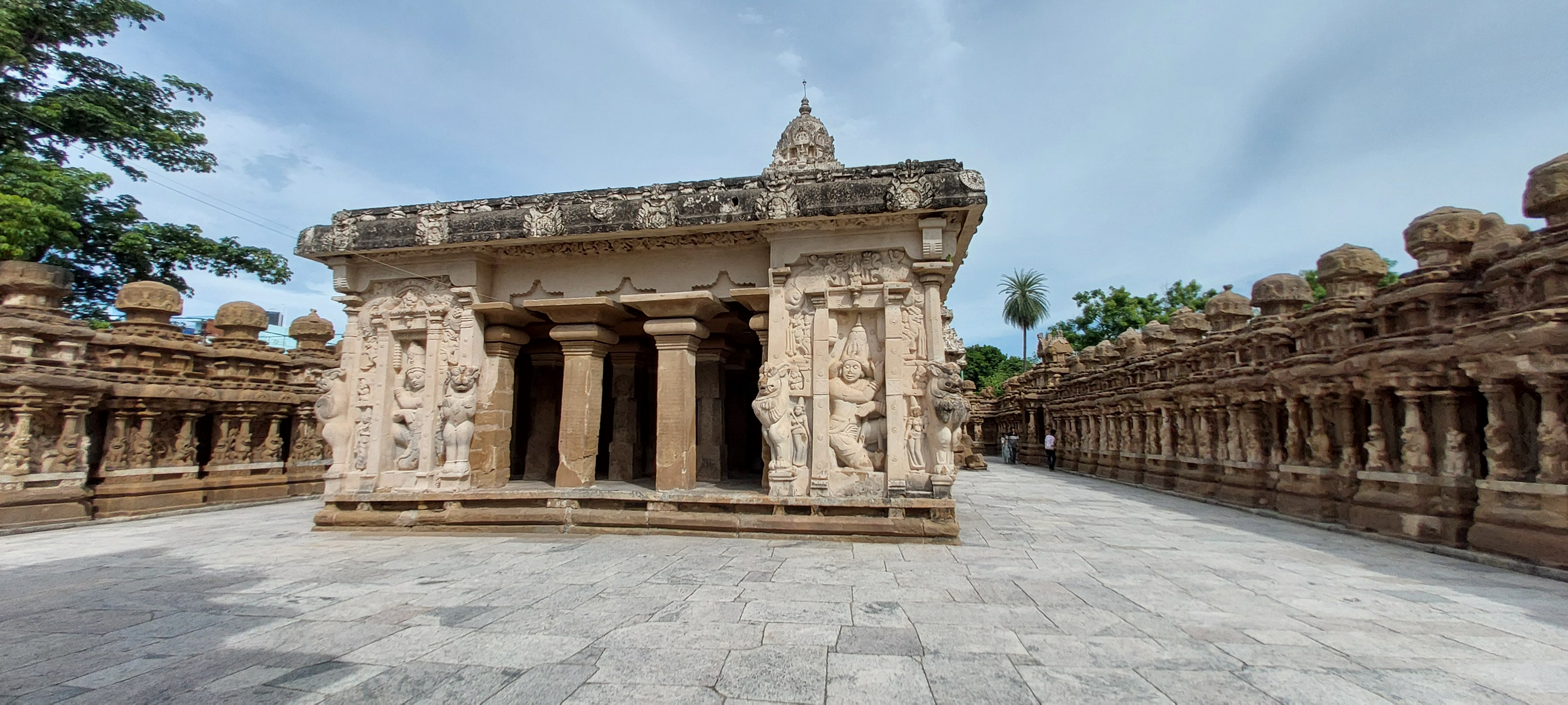
View of the temple

The temple has retained the Pallava architecture in its original stylized form with influence of the later styles developed by the Chola Dynasty and Vijayanagara Emperors. It is of stone built architecture unlike the rock cut architecture built into hallowed caves or carved into rock outcrops as in Mahabalipuram. The tall gopuram (tower) is to the left and the temple complex is to the right. The temple's foundations are made of granite, which could withstand the weight of the temple, while the superstructure, including the carvings, are all made of sandstone. Initially, only the main sanctuary existed with pyramidal vimana and a detached mandapa (main hall).

The temple complex is complete in all respects as it has garbagriha (sanctum sanctorum), antarala (inner enclosure), mandapa, a high compound wall, and an entrance gate, the gopuram. The mandapa, which was initially detached, was made part of the main shrine by interposing an ardhamantapa (smaller hall). The pillars of the mandapa have the repetitive features of mythical lion mounts.

The structure has a simple layout with a tower or vimana at the center of the complex. The vimana of the temple, above the main shrine (sanctum sanctorum), is square in plan and rises up in a pyramidal shape. The tower has many levels rising proportionately.At the top of this tower, there is a small roof in the shape of a dome. The pillar elements with mythical animal shapes (lions on the base) are extra features in Pallava style. At the entrance, the gopuram walls are plastered. Its entrance wall has eight small shrines and a gopura, precursor to the main gopura. At some later stage, the mandapa and the sanctuary were joined by an intermediate hall called the ardhamantapa, which is reported to have marred the beauty of the temple to some extent. The temple is enclosed within walls in a rectangular layout.

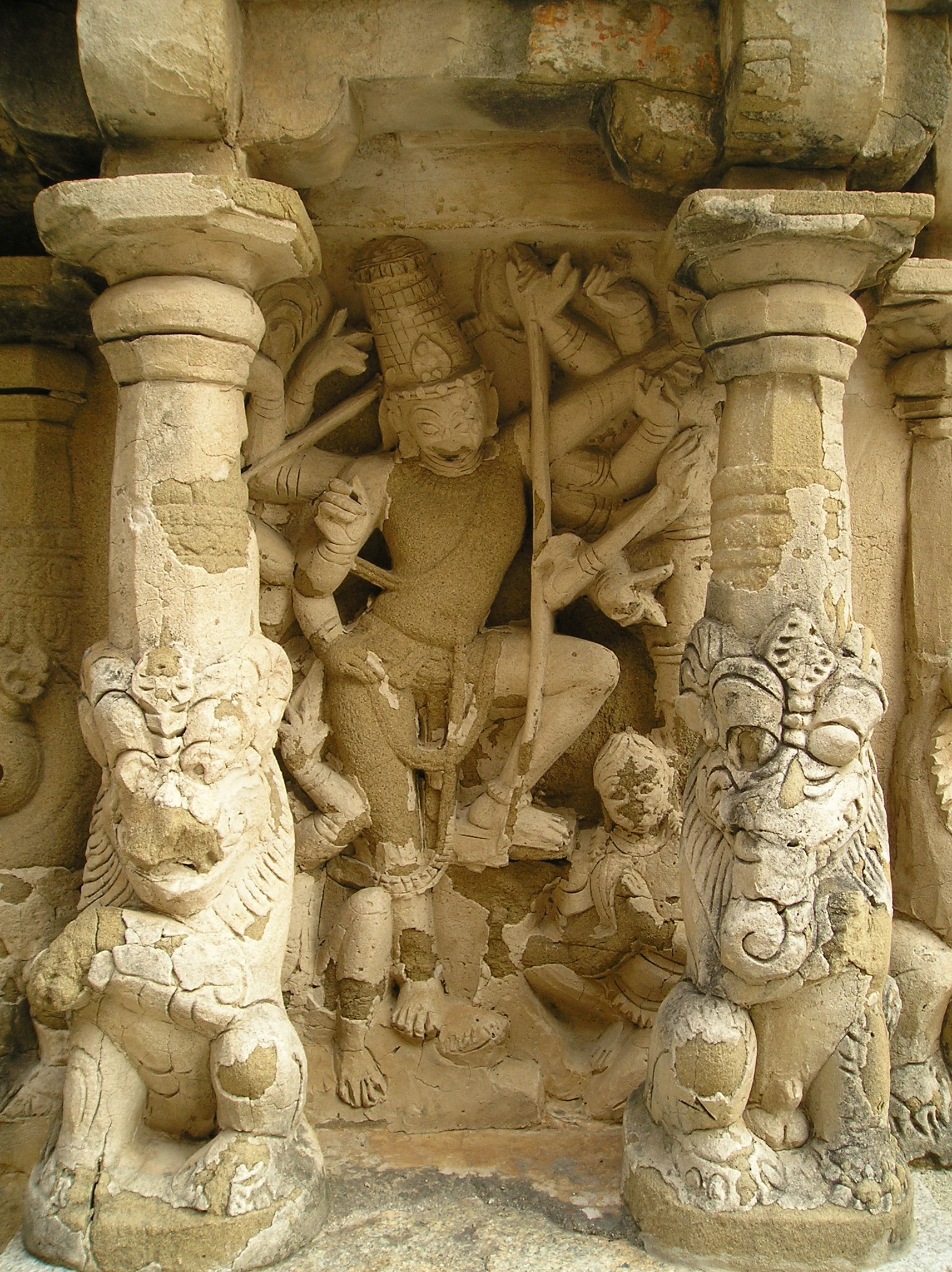
A sculpture in one of the niches of the 58 subshrines.

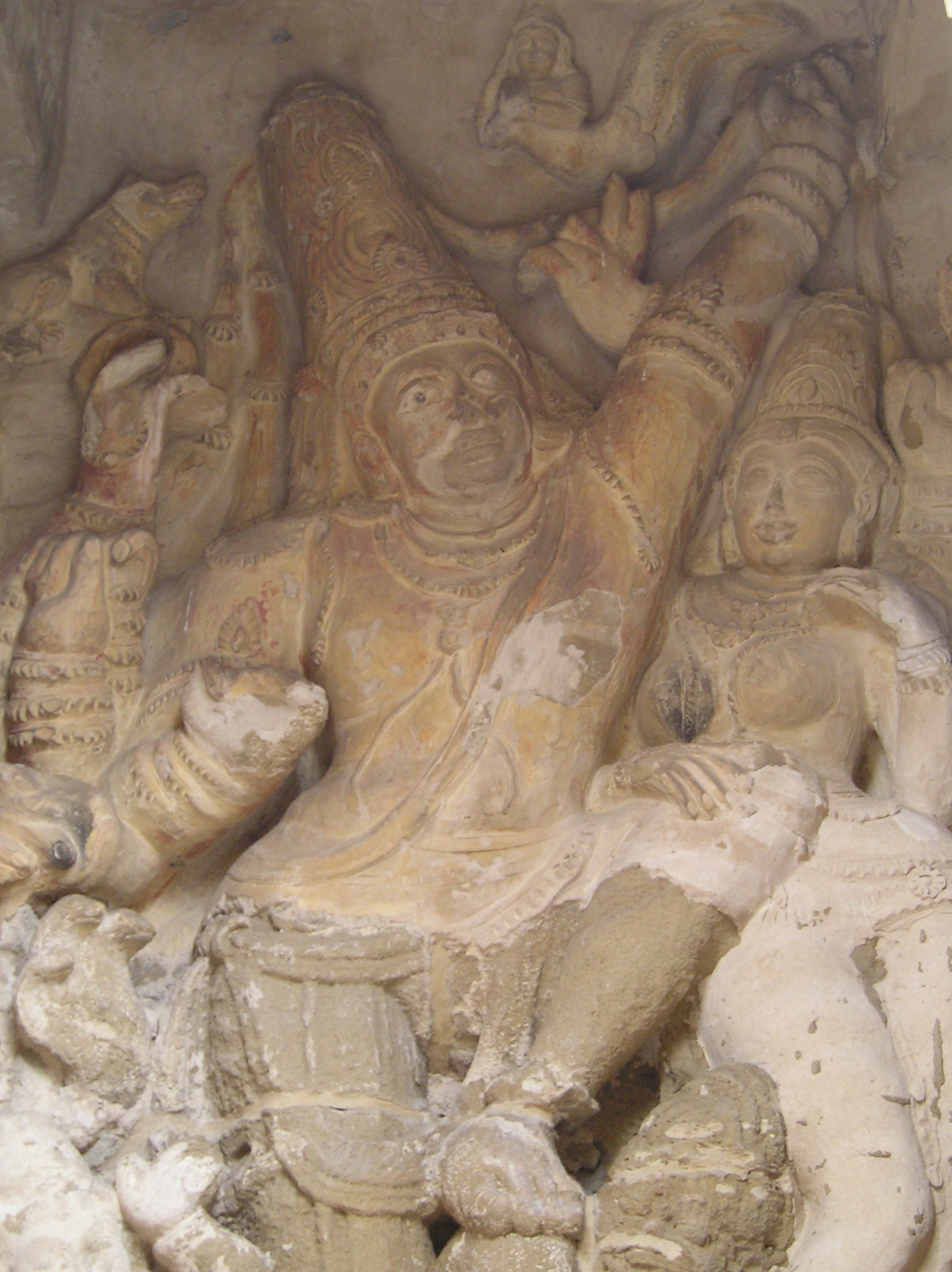
Sculpture depicting Shiva as Gangadhara capturing the river Ganges with a strand of his hair.

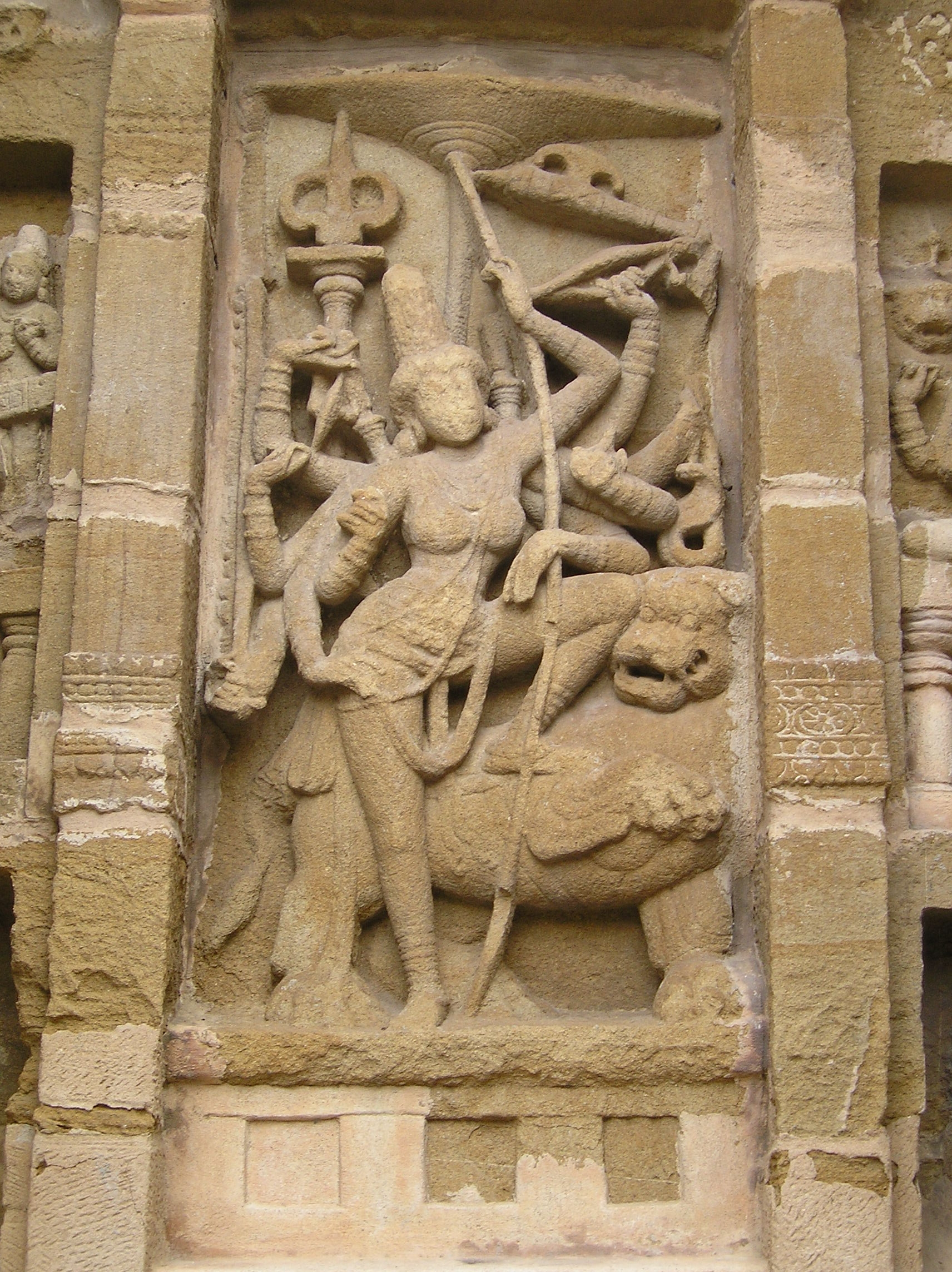
Sculpture depicting Goddess Durga.

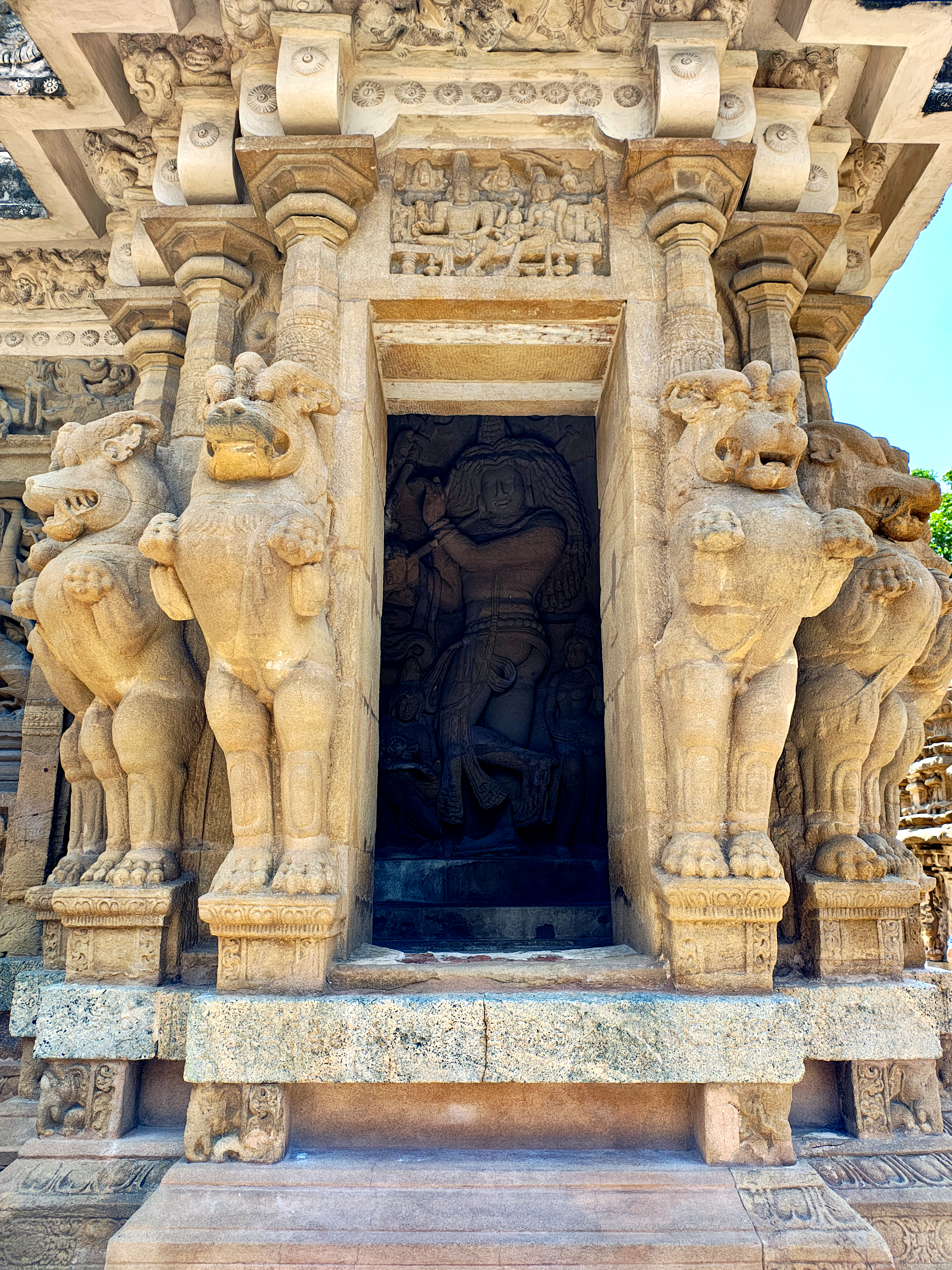
Kailasanathar Temple Sculpture

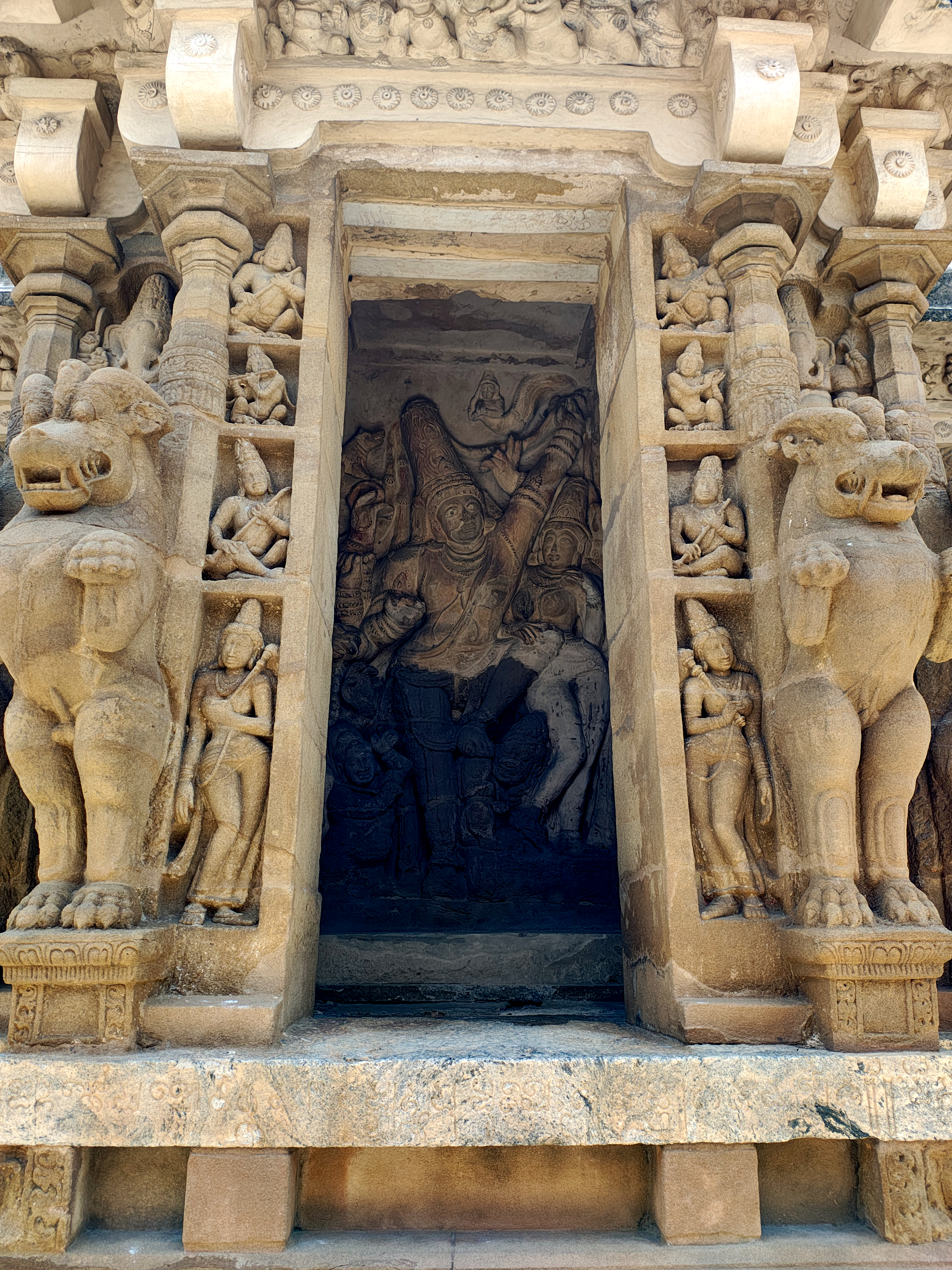
Kailasanathar Temple Sculpture

The main shrine has a 16 sided Shivalinga in black granite stone deified in the sanctum sanctorum. Within the walls of the main shrine is the padabhanda adhisthana (main pedestal) with intricately carved idols, including a one of Nandi, which serves as guard to the deity as is traditional in Shiva temples of the region. Deities can be found carved into the outer walls of the main shrine.

In the south facing wall the sculpture depicts Shiva as Umamaheshavara (Shiva with his consort Parvati) with Lingodbhava (emergence of Shiva as fiery pillar - linga) surrounded by Brahma and Vishnu and flying amaras on the lower level.

The west facing hall has sculptures of Shiva in the form of Sandhya Tandavamurti and Urdhava Tandvamurti and the ensemble is completed with images of ganas in dancing poses and also with images of Brahma, Vishnu, Nandi and Parvati.

The carving of Shiva on the north facing wall is a composition of Tripurantaka flanked by three ganas, goddess Durga with three ganas, and goddesses Bhairavi, Kaushiki and Jyestha.

The exterior faces of the vimana (tower) have images of aspects of Shiva - Bhikshatana, Somaskanda and in Samhara-Tandava (destructive dancing) pose.

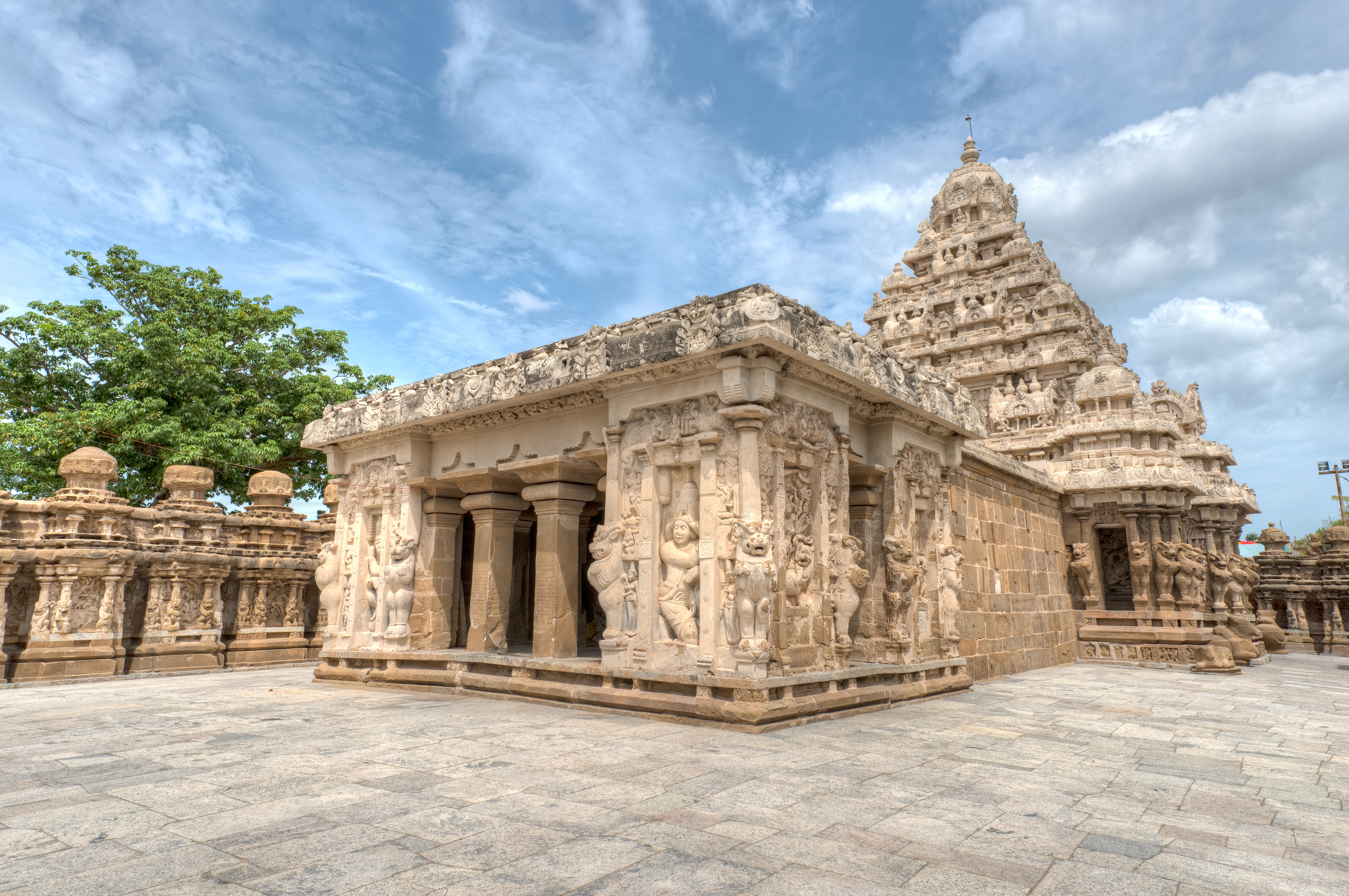
Central shrine

In the inner walls of the prakara (circumambulatory passage) there is galaxy of images of Durga, Kartikeya, Bhavati, Tripurantaka, Garudarudha-Vishnu, Asura Samhara (slaying of demons), Narasimha (Vishnu's avatar), Trivikrama (another Vishnu's avatar), Shiva Tandava (Shiva in a dancing pose), Shiva severing the fifth head of Brahma, desecration of Yagna of Daksha, Brahma and his wife, Gangadhara, Urdhava tandava, Vishnu flanked by Bhudevi and Sridevi, Lingodbhava, Bhikshatana, Ravana, and Vali offering prayers to Atmalinga Chandikeshvara. The image of Ardhanariswara sitting on a bull is considered the most noteworthy among all images.

Vimana's south facing wall has an image of Shiva in a sitting posture of peace and quietude known as Dakshinamurthy, and its west wall has Shiva in the form of Lingodbhava.

The tower has multiple shrines embodied on all its external faces which have the appearance of miniature shrines. These shrines have three features, the sala (rectangular), kuta (square) and panjara (apsidal) styles. Eight small shrines also decorate the entrance wall. The 58 small shrines are built into the niches of the compound wall that encloses the main shrine; they depict Somaskanada reliefs of Shiva and his consort Parvathi in many dance forms.

The temple maybe built using a geopolymer that looks like sandstone.

=== Other features ===
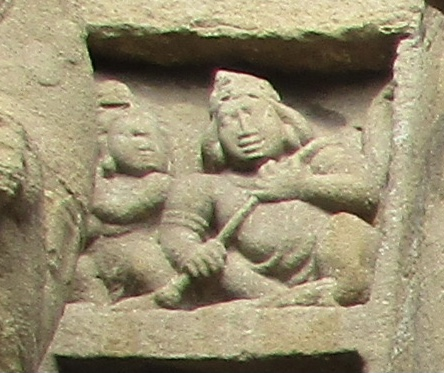
A small figure playing the alapini vina in a niche

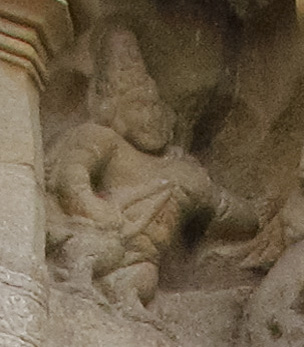
Kinnara playing a yazh, c. 8th century CE

The outstanding feature of sculptures is the profusion of depiction of the erect lions projecting out in several directions.There are two sculptures of Shiva here which are seen holding the alapini veena (musical string instrument) in the hand. There is a lot of difference between the veenas found in the said sculptures and the present day veena. There are also beautiful sculptures of Mathahvialasa Prakshanam. The temple also has the earliest stone inscription which records of the twenty eight Saivagamas (Shaiva saints) in which the Pallava King Rajasimhavarman states his faith in Shaivism. The murals on the inner walls are well preserved.

== Circumambulatory passage ==
A circumambulatory passage, with a symbolic meaning is situated along the compound wall. In order to make the circumambulation, there is a narrow entry passage which devotees must crawl through. Seven steps must be climbed in order to reach the passage. Passing through the narrow passage is indicative of passage through life. After circumambulation, the exit is through a pit or another narrow passage symbolic of death. The entry point for this passage is called the Gate of Death (Tamil: இறப்பு வாசல்). It is believed that making the circumambulation round the various deities would usher the same blessings as visiting paradise. When one completes circumambulation, crawling and coming out of the passage indicates coming out of their mother's womb and also explains Hindus' belief of rebirth. Hence, the exit is called the Gate of Birth (Tamil: பிறப்பு வாசல்). There is another belief that by completing this circumambulatory passage, the cycle of rebirth is broken and one attains Moksha. The passage explains the life cycle including aging process, death and rebirth. Maha Shivaratri is the biggest festival held in the temple when thousand of devotees throng the temple in the evening hours to offer prayers to the main deity.
