= Alapini veena =

Musical instrument

Ālāpiṇī vīṇā and eka-tantrī vīṇā

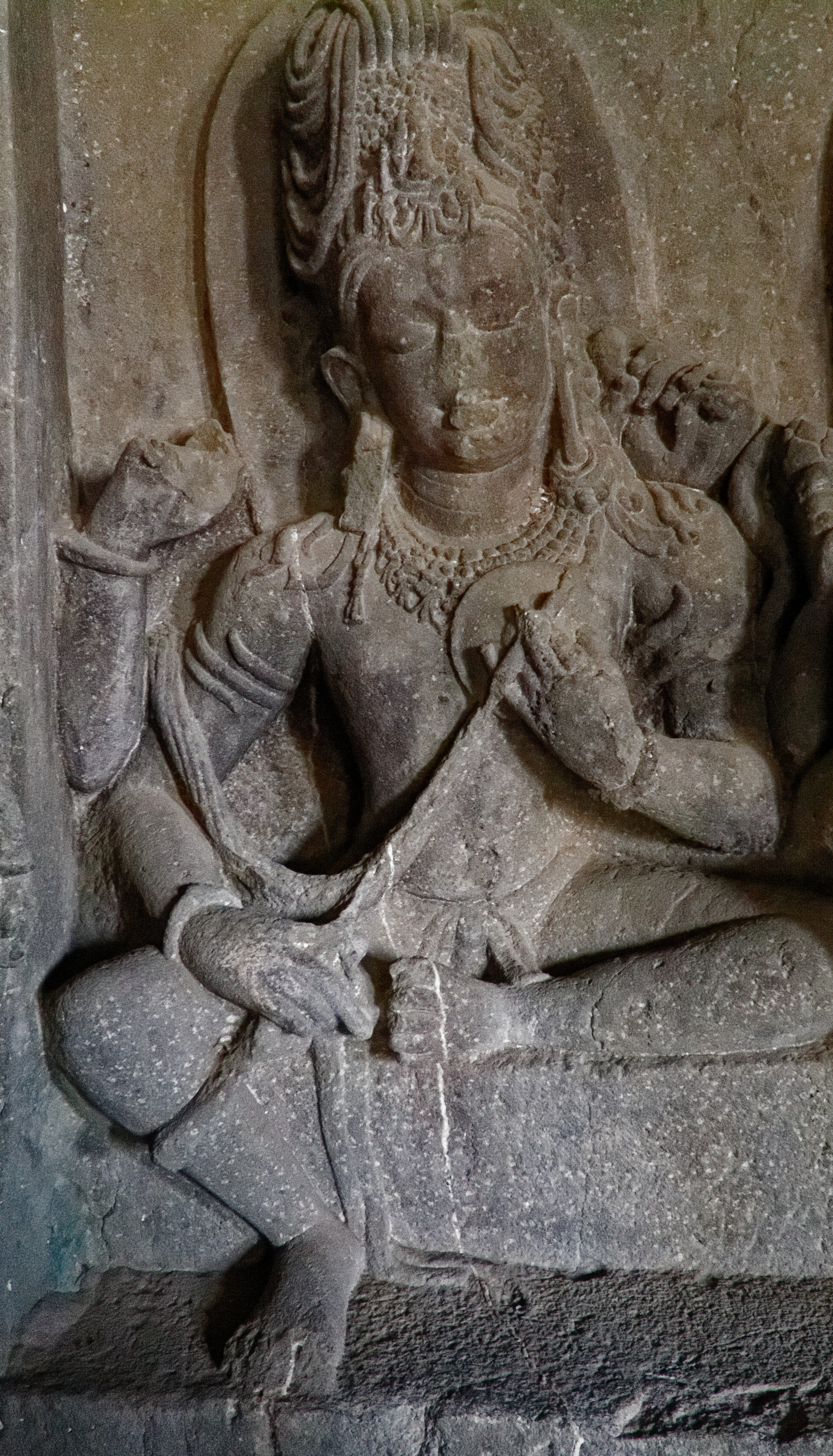
India, Ellora Caves, cave 21, 7th-8th century C.E. Shiva with an ālāpiṇī vīṇā.

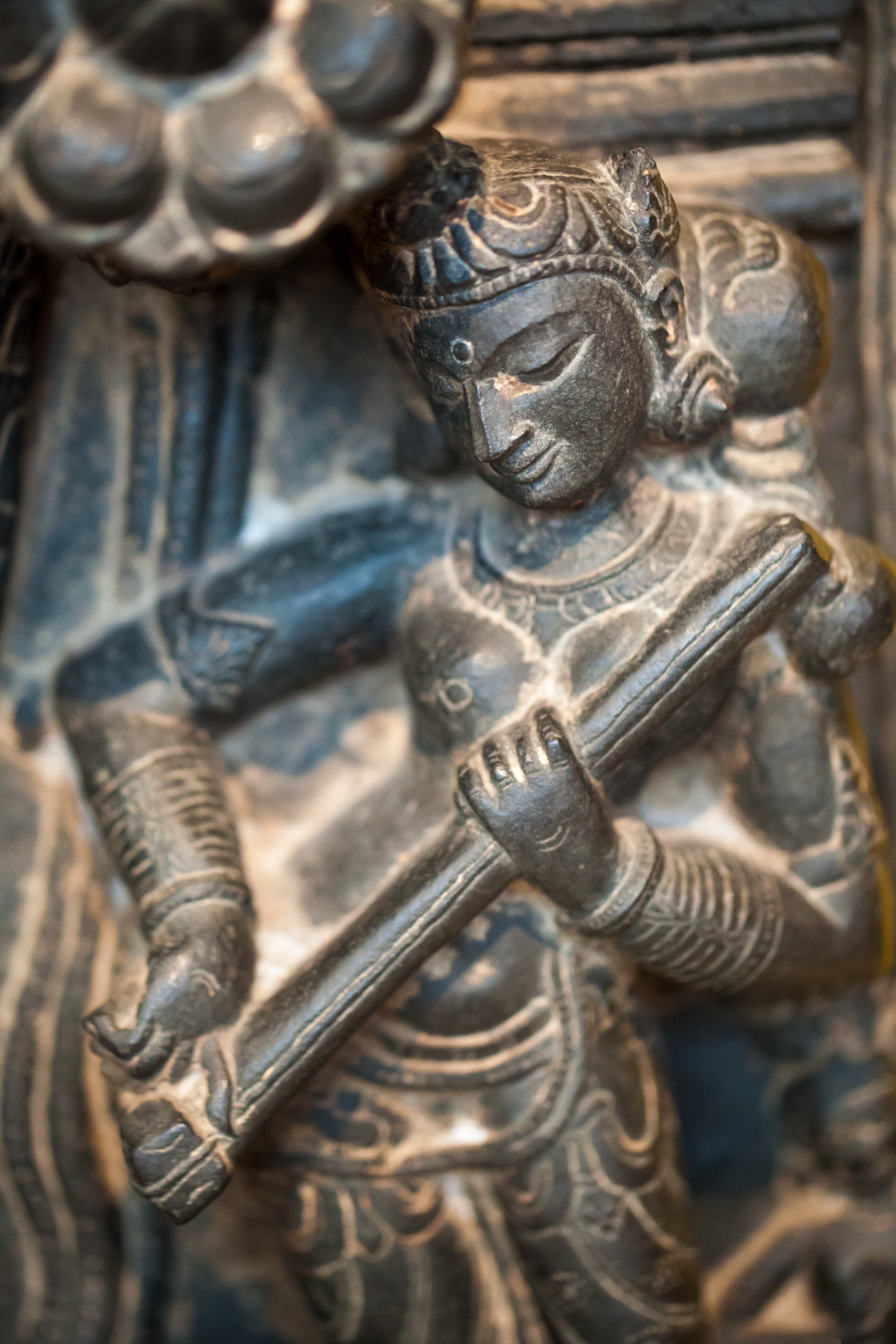
Bangladesh, Pala period 10th–12th century C.E. Saraswati with a tube zither, an ālāpiṇī vīṇā or eka-tantrī vīṇā.

The alapini vina is represented in sculpture with two thickness of tube or stick. Earliest images show a much thinner stick. By the 10th—12th century C.E., the larger tube zither form was common as well.

The ālāpiṇī vīṇā was a medieval stick-zither veena in India, with a single string and a gourd resonator. Later forms added more strings. The instruments became prominent in Indian music after 500 C.E. as instruments of court music. Alongside the eka-tantri vina and kinnari vina it replaced the harp-style veenas and lute-style veenas. The instruments were used in Southeast Asia, both mainland and island nations, and were recorded in sculpture and relief sculpture.

Although the stick zithers and tube zithers are very similar, it is possible that they have different origins. Early paintings of stick zithers in India date back at least to the 5th century C.E. The earliest currently known stick zither is in the Caves of Ajanta at the end of the 5th century. After a period of assuming that tube zithers spread from India to Southeast Asia, modern scholars have been trying to decide if the tube zithers might have originated in Southeast Asia and spread to India. Whatever the origins, Indian influence on musical culture in Southeast Asia is recorded in the archaeological remains of past civilizations.

Similar instruments today include the Cambodian kse diev and the Thai phin namtao and phin pia.

== Identifying the ālāpiṇī vīṇā ==
Development of fretted instrument

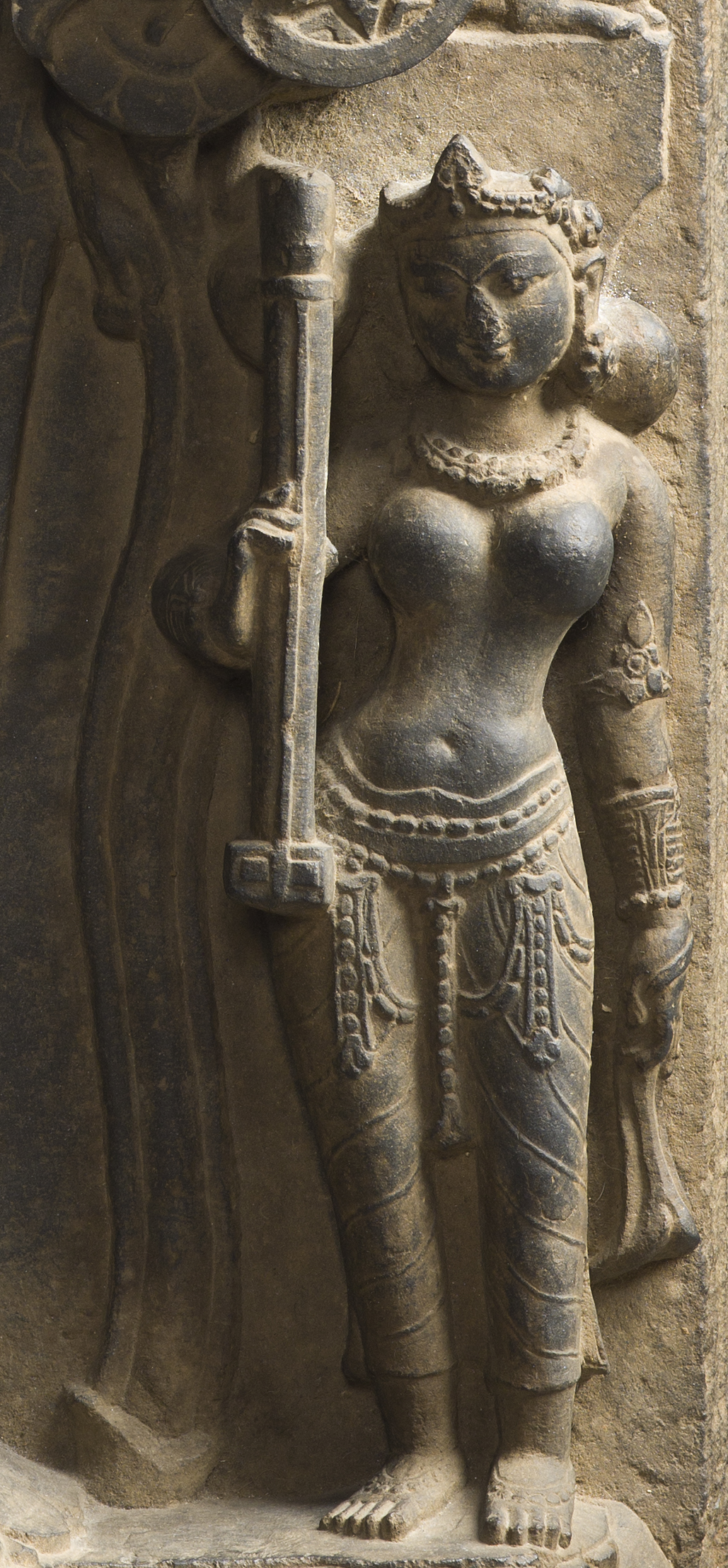
Saraswati holding an Eka-tantri vina, ca. 1000 C.E. This image clearly shows the bridge (bottom of instrument) which would sustain the string's note and create a buzzing quality.

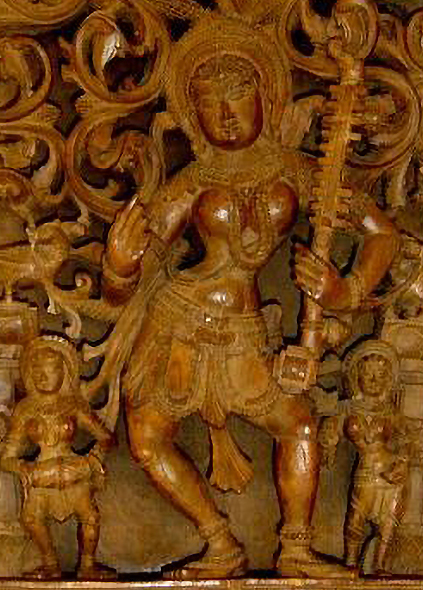
Sarasvati with a fretted kinnari vina, with an apparent makara or yali on the top. Fretted tube-zither vinas are mentioned in literature by 800 C.E., coexisting with the non-fretted vinas. The rudra veena descends from the kinnari veena. The square at the bottom of the instrument is a stylized version of the bridge from the eka-tantri vina.

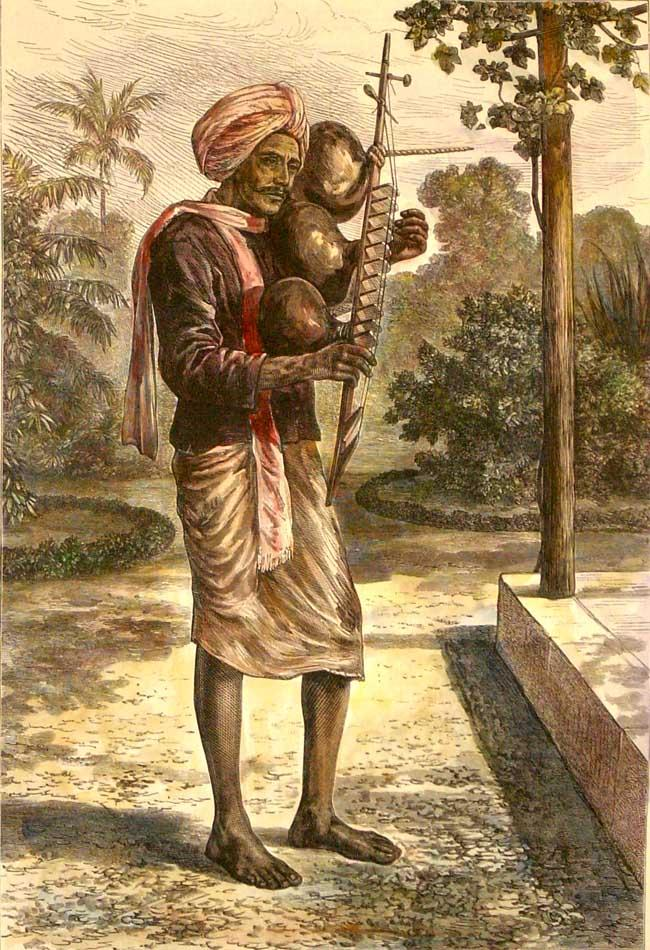
Madras, 1876. Kinnari vina labeled "tingadee." The spike is a bridge, directing string energy to resonator. In later kinnari vinas a third gourd was added in the center, which was pressed into the chest, similar to the alapini vina.

The ālāpiṇī vīṇā, eka-tantri vina and kinnari vina were all mentioned in the 12th-13th century book Sangita Ratnakara by Śārṅgadeva. The 19th-century kinnari vina appears to have traits of both the alapini vina and the eka-tantri vina. The gourd of the kinnari vina pressed into the musician's chest is similar to the alapini vina. The gourd high enough to go over the shoulder is a trait of the eka-tantri vina. Eka-tantri means single string. The alapini vina may have developed into a multi-stringed instrument. The kinnari veena had two strings in the early to mid-19th century; the early 20th century kinnari vina in the Metropolitan Museum of Art has two main strings, and like the rudra veena that came from it, three side strings. The kinnari vina had waxed on frets, and the alapini vina may also have developed frets.

Instruments in paintings and sculpture are not generally labeled, and researchers have had to apply the names ālāpiṇī vīṇā and eka-tantrī vīṇā (one-string vina) to different instruments. Iconography can't show whether the rods or bodies are hollow, and researchers have had to look for clues in literature.

Instruments in surviving images that are labeled eka-tantrī vīṇā are generally tube zithers with wide tubes and a gourd attached to the top, the gourd held over the musician's shoulder and the other end past their hip, with a single string and no frets. Musician's are shown sliding the straightened fingers of their upper hand on the string, or holding a stick to slide on the string, and plucking with their lower hand.

Instruments labeled ālāpiṇī vīṇā tend to be stick zithers, held shoulder to hip with a gourd resonator that is pressed into the musician's stomach, chest or shoulder, the musician's upper hand normally held over that gourd with fingers wide to choose notes, the lower hand plucking the string. The body of the instrument may have been made of a 2 inch thick rod of red sandal wood or khadira wood, or may have been a bamboo tube. The earliest of these instruments were obvious stick zithers, the stick too narrow to make an effective resonating tube. Later instruments were as thick, the musician's hand barely able to stretch around the tube. Often in sculpture, the stick has curves.

The instruments are fretless, the earliest depictions showing a single string. The later instruments labeled kinnari vina were fretted and show traits of both instruments, with gourds that are pressed into the chest and also rise above the shoulder.

In medieval artwork, a second lower gourd has been seen on both stick zithers and tube zithers. Artwork for the eka-tantri vina commonly shows a second carved resonator or gourd resonator near the instrument's lower end.

That is more rare in the alapini vina style stick zithers. Patrick Kersale identified two at the Bayon temple in Angkor, Cambodia, from the 13th century circus scene. Another can be seen in alcove 46 or 47 of the Kailasanathar Temple, Kanchipuram, Tamil Nadu, India.

=== Modern instruments ===
Musicologist Lars-Christian Koch pointed out that modern instruments exist in Orissa or Radhjasthan, which can help us understand how the instruments might have sounded. Similarly, ethnomusicologist Patrick Kersale has documented modern instruments, including in Cambodia the kse diev, in Laos the kani zither (Oy people) and in Vietnam the brok zither (Jarai people and Êdê people). With the kse diev, the gourd is pressed with different pressures into the player's, and the ring finger of the right hand plucks, while the left hand applies pressure on the string at the players chest.

Koch warns about assuming too much when looking at modern instruments. He said there is no "direct transfer of playing technique, tone supply or repertoire" so that the instruments in medieval India may have been played differently and to different kinds of music compared to modern instruments.

=== The instruments in literature ===
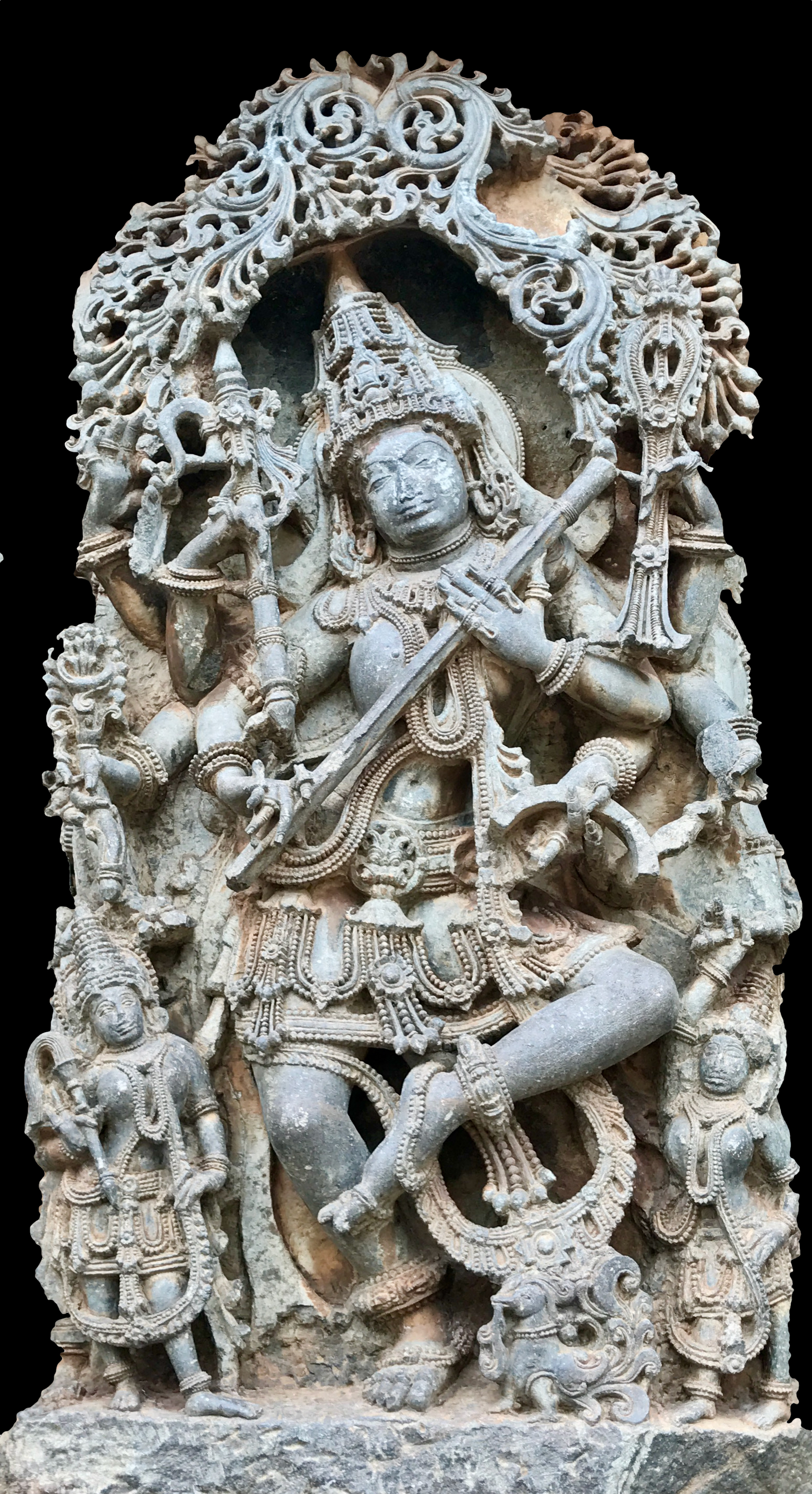
14th century A.D. Saraswati playing a likely Alapini veena at the Hoysaleswara Temple.

Based on definitions from Indian literature, the unifying criterion is that both have a single string and a gourd resonator. The literature includes the Nāṭyaśāstra (written sometime between 2nd century B.C.E. - 3rd century C.E.) by Bharata Muni and the Sangita Ratnakara (written 1210 - 1247 AD) by Śārṅgadeva.

==== According to Śārṅgadeva ====
In the 13th century, the Sangita Ratnakara placed vinas into three categories: fretless (into which the eka-tanktri vina was placed), harps, and fretted vinas (which included the alapini vina and the kinnari vina). Frets were possibly introduced as a reaction to the invention of the 12-string scale, ca. 700-800. In 1400, the frets on the kinnari vina were attributed to Matanga (800 A.D.) the author of Brhad-desi.

For the alapini vina Śārṅgadeva described an instrument 36 inches long, the red sandalwood or Khadirah wood or bamboo rod 2 inches in circumference. The cup (tumba) was made from coconut, and its string was reportedly made of silk, producing a delicate sound.

Comparison, the eka-tantri vina which Śārṅgadeva described was instrument made of Khadirah wood, less than a yard long, with a dandam "a stetched palm" (about 5-8 inches) in circumference, and 1.5 inches narrower on the bottom where a yali might be carved.

==== Modern researchers ====
Researchers Piyal Bhattacharya and Shreetama Chowdhury described the eka-tantrī vīṇā as being a larger instrument, with a "bigger tube" and bigger gourd, compared to the ālāpiṇī vīṇā, which they described as a stick zither. The researchers looked at where the instrument's gourd was placed while playing; they indicated instruments with the gourd over the shoulder were eka-tantrī vīṇās and those pressed against the chest were ālāpiṇī vīṇās.

The writers for the vīnā entry in the New Grove Dictionary of Musical Instruments called the ālāpiṇī vīṇā a stick zither, in which the stick might be a bamboo or wooden tube. They focused on how the vinas were played. The gourd on the ālāpiṇī vīṇā was cut to form a cup or bowl, the opening of which could be placed against the musician's body while playing, creating a "closed resonance chamber". On the eka-tantrī vīṇā and later Kinarri vina the gourd (bottom intact) used for the resonance chamber rested over the musician's shoulder. These latter two might have a second or third gourd added further down, creating the modern kinarri vina and rudra veena

=== Symbolism ===
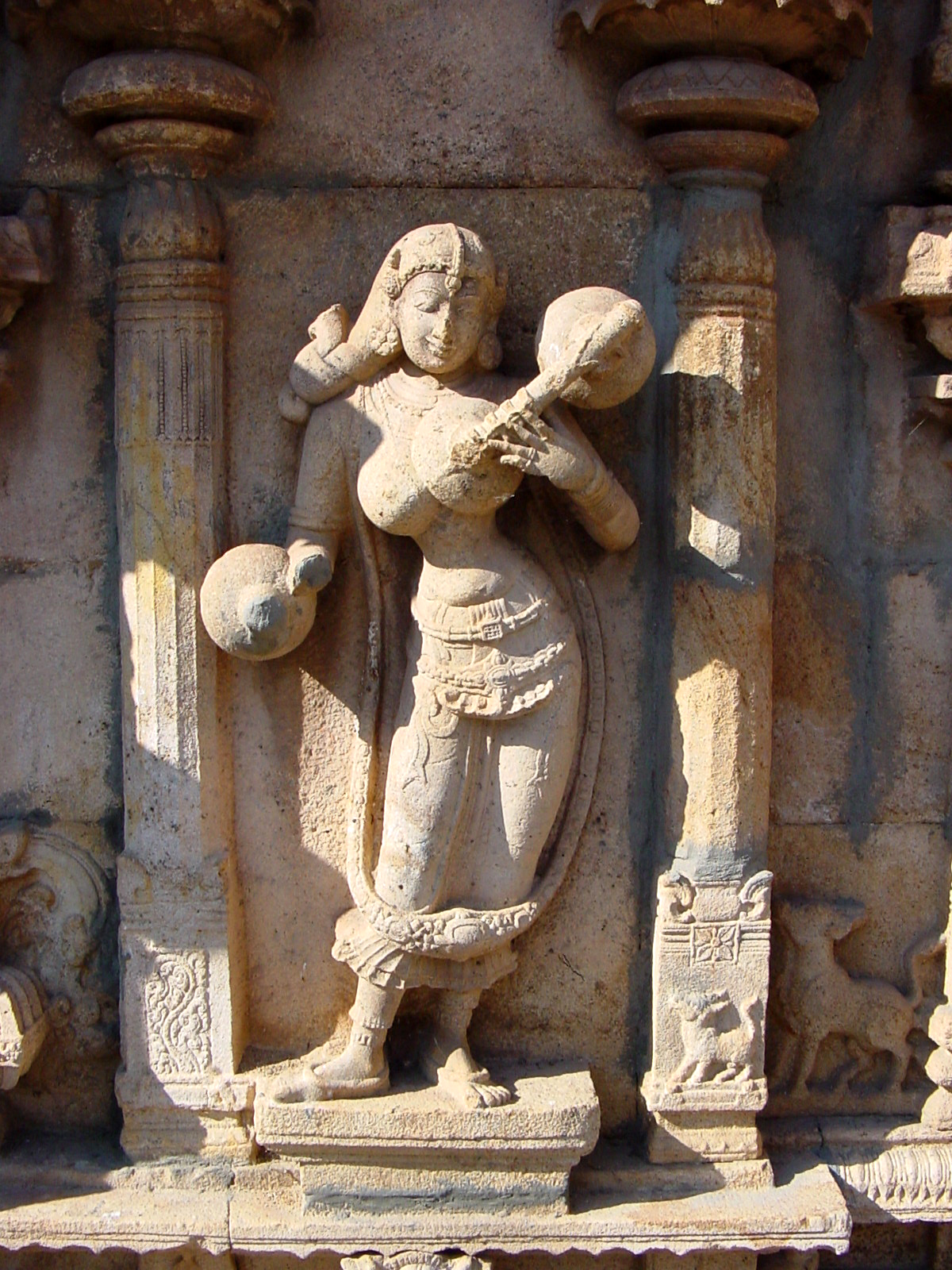
17th century sculpture of a rudra veena that has a figure carved into the vina's tube, just below the upper gourd. The carving resembles a crocodile, in a style similar to that on the Malayan kundu drum. The crocodile was called a makara in Hindi. One early vina was called the makara vina.

Different symbolism appears on the instruments over time. In Hinduism, the instruments have been associated with the gods Shiva, Saraswati, and Nataraja. Shiva has been portrayed playing it romantically for Paravati, and as an ascetic, Natajara, in his form as the divine dancer. Saraswati is a goddess of flowing things, including water, wisdom and music. Much less frequently, Krishna has also been portrayed playing the vina and dancing; the instrument is not iconically associated with him, as his instrument is the flute.

The instrument has been portrayed in Buddhist temple art in the hands of humans, as well as celestial kinnaras, half human, half bird figures.

Some kinnari vinas in museums seem to have bird-related carvings and feathers on the ends. Some alapini vinas and eka-tantri vinas have very styled ends that resemble the heads of monsters, similar to the Makara water monster's or the Yali's. Both monsters had forms that included an elephant's trunk, a feature found on some kinnari vinas.

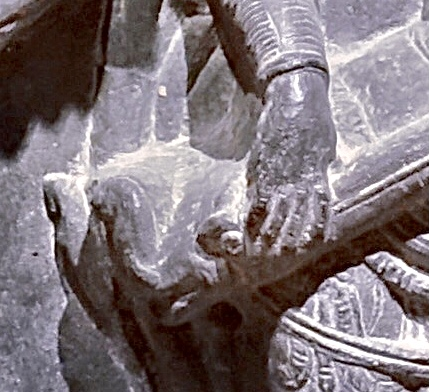
Makara or yali on alapini vina, 12th century, Pala Empire artwork

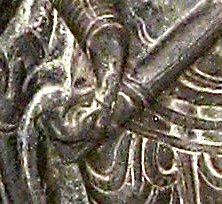
Makara or yali (or possibly a bird), from Saraswati playing alapini vina, from Hindu stone sculpture in National Museum, New Delhi

== Playing ==
When playing the musician could press the cut off side of the gourd into their chest; in modern versions such as the Cambodian Kse Diev, the musician tightens and loosens the gourd to their chest to change tone. The player holds the instrument with their left hand; this limits his ability to move the hand to one stop on the string. While plucking with the right hand, the player uses their forefinger to lightly touch the string for more notes.

== Stick zithers ==
The instruments were recorded in sculpture and relief sculpture in Sambor Prei Kuk in the 7th century C.E., Borobudur in the 9th century C.E., the Pala Empire in the 10th—12th centuries C.E., Bayon in the 13th century, and Angkor Wat in the 16th century.

Instruments using the ālāpiṇī vīṇā's style of pressing to the players chest can be seen in to Southeast Asia. Examples can be seen in ruins from Malayan culture at Borobudur and Cambodian culture at Angkor Wat. Modern instruments related to it or using a similar half-gourd resonance system include the Cambodian kse diev, Thai phin namtao and Indian tuila (among tribes in Jharkhand and Odisha). These instruments have different features; some like the kse muoy have an extra gourd or the phin namtoa multiple strings. This may be seen as "evidence" that the ālāpiṇī vīṇā developed into other instruments.

At least one example of the chest-pressed Southeast Asian zithers has bee-n found in artwork with a second gourd, in Bayon. The instruments were played in the same style as the zithers with a single gourd. These instruments are thus linked to the ālāpiṇī vīṇā for the method of playing them, and to the eka-tantrī vīṇā for the additional gourd, a path that led to the rudra vina in India.

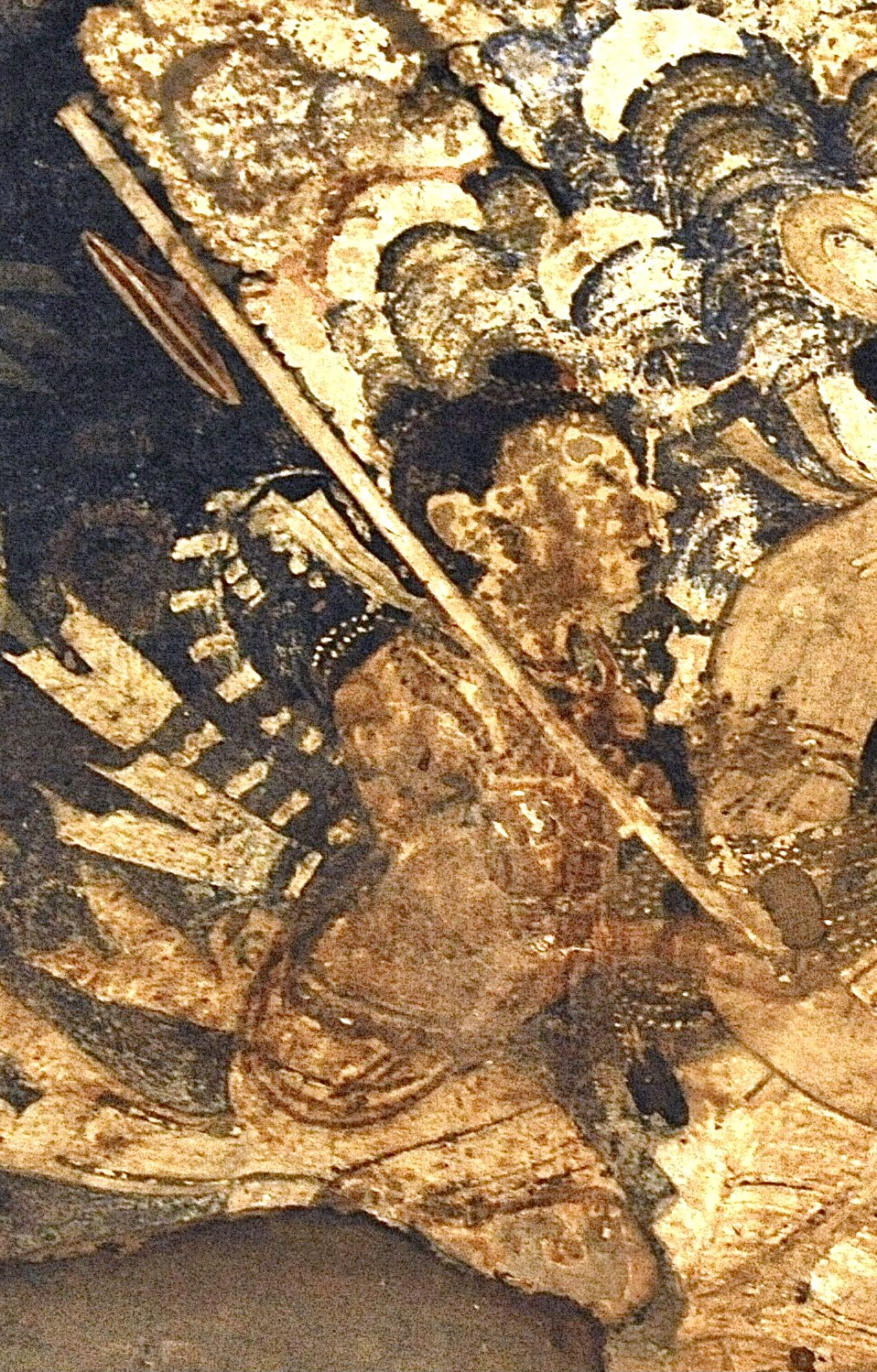
India, 5th century C.E. Ajanta Caves, Cave 17. Musician plucking an alapini vina, a stick-zither style veena resting on his shoulder.

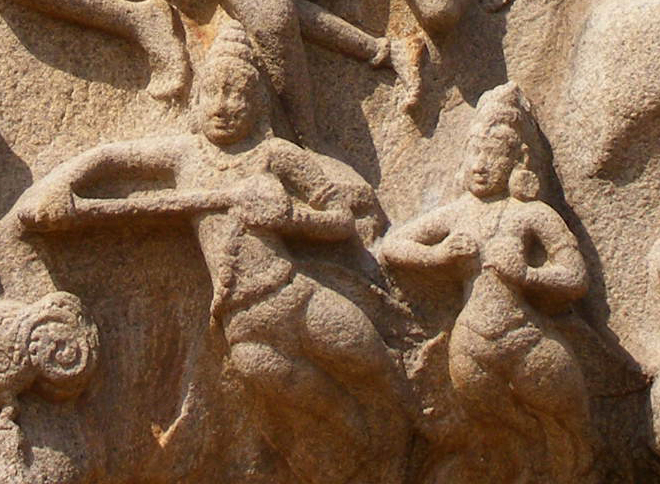
Ca. 7th century C.E. Kinnaras playing alapini vina and chime cymbals, from Mammallapuram relief.

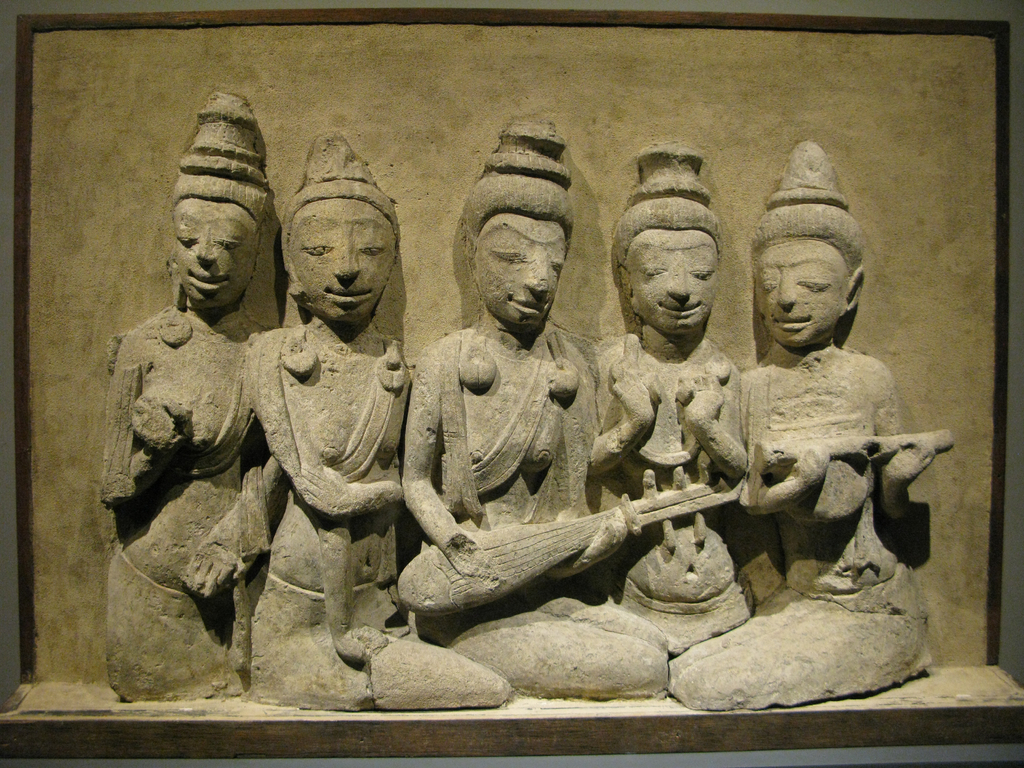
Hindu. 650-700 C.E., Thailand, Ku Bua, (Dvaravati culture). Three musicians in right are playing (from center) a 5-stringed lute, cymbals, a tube zither or bar zither with gourd resonator.

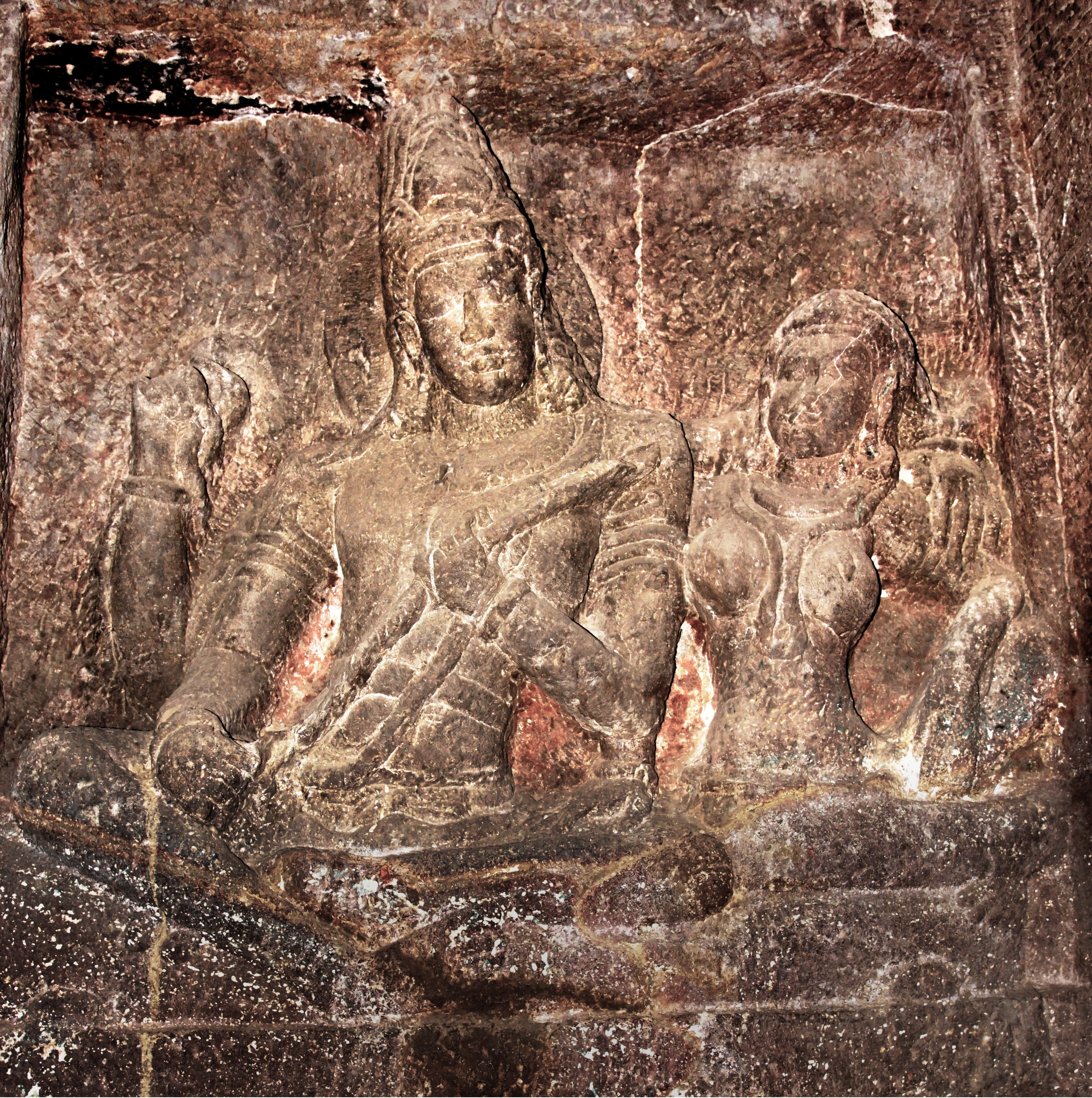
India, ca. 8th century C.E. Siva playing a stick-zither vina for Parvati in Ellora Caves, image in side passage of Kailash temple (cave 16)

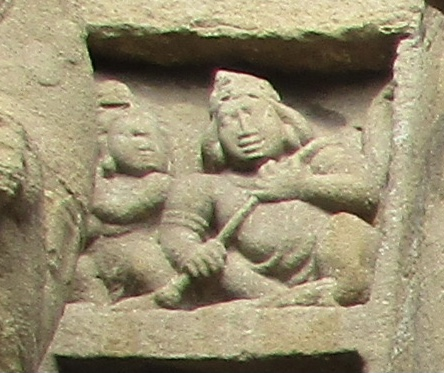
India, ca. 7th-8th century C.E. A kinnara (?) playing Alapini vina at Kanchi Kailasanathar.

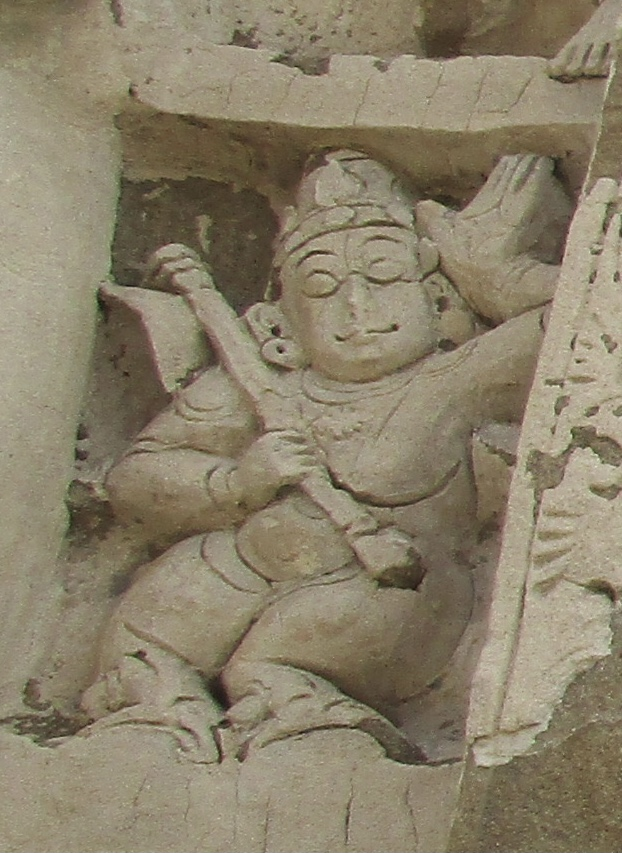
India, 7th-8th century C.E. Figure holding an Alapini vina at Kailasanathar Temple

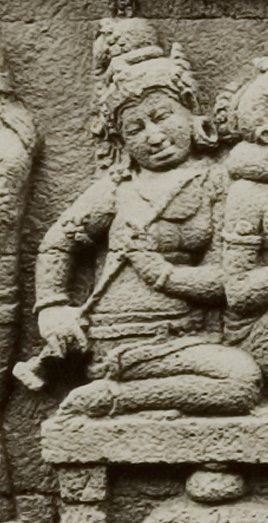
9th century C.E. Stick zither with resonator in Borobudur.

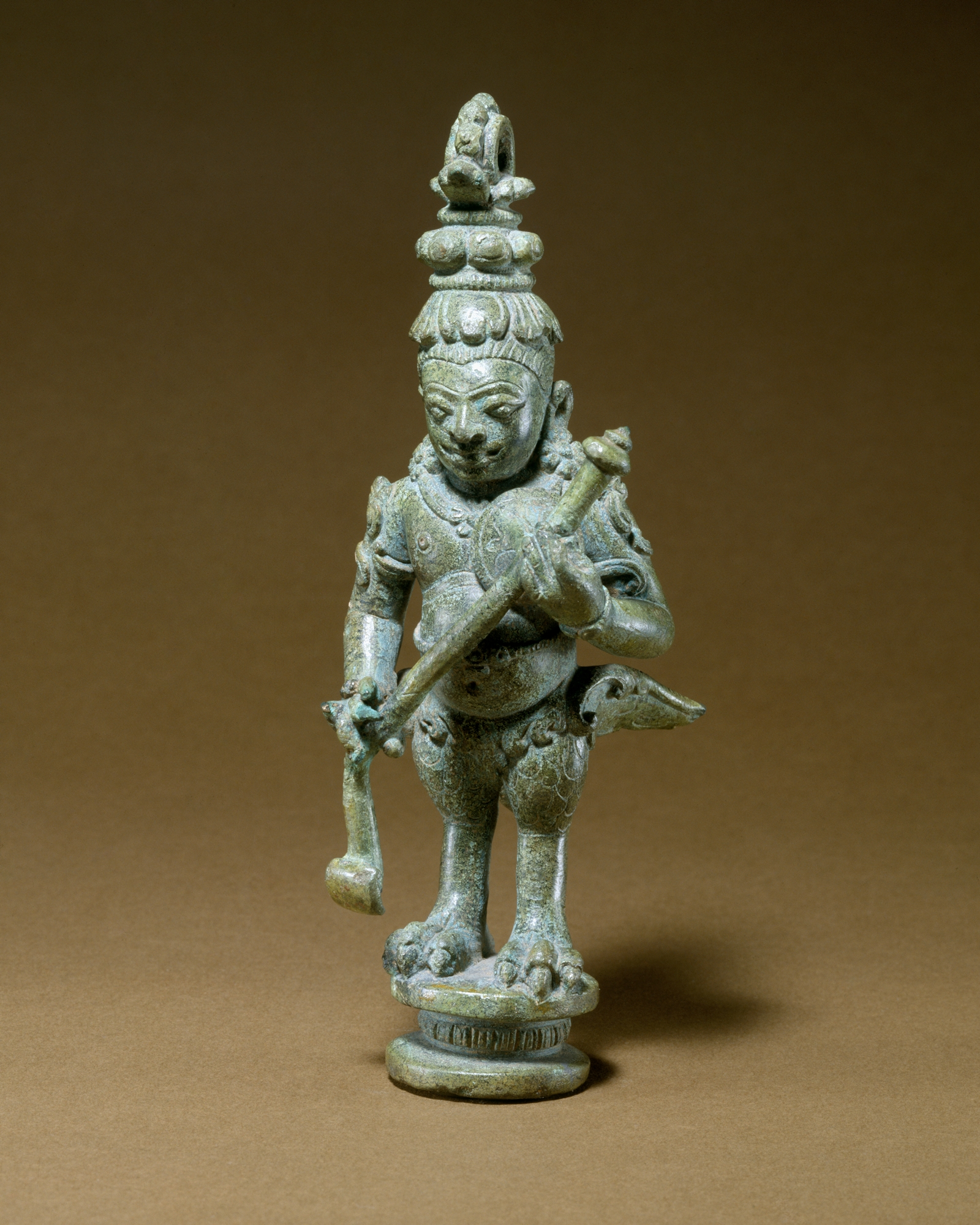
Indonesia (Java), ca. 900-925 C.E. Kinnara playing vina

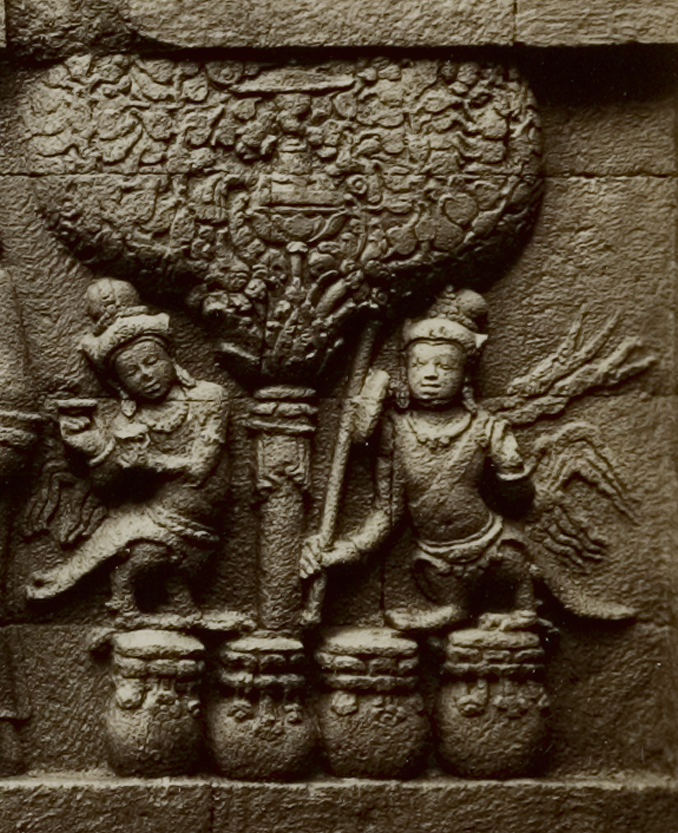
9th century C.E. Kinnaras with cymbals and stick-zither veena; they are standing on tifa-like drums or pots. Bas-relief at Borobudur near Magelang - 1890-1891.

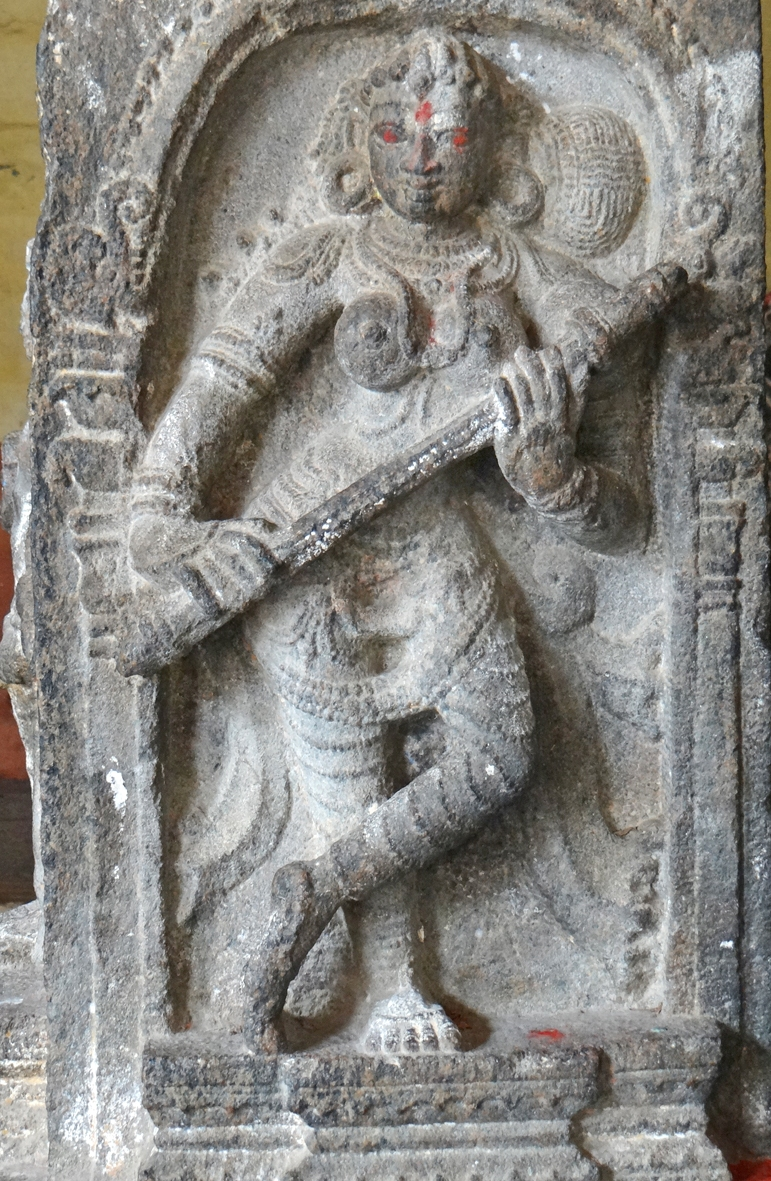
Nataraja Temple, Chidambaram, ca. 12th-13th century C.E. Shivakamasundari (one of the forms of Parvati) playing an alapini vina, the resonator pressed into her shoulder

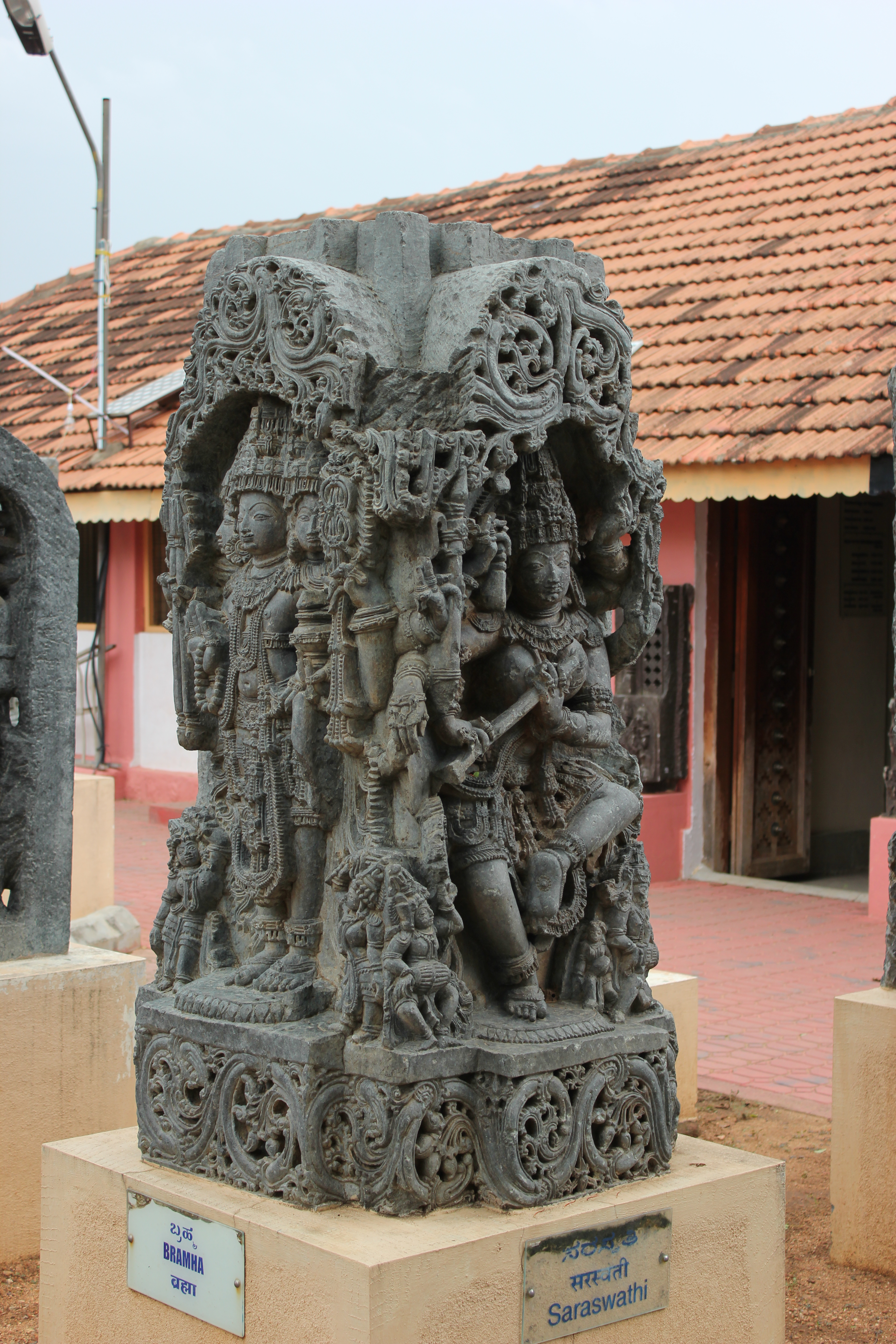
India, ca. 12th century C.E. Hoysaleswara Temple. Saraswati playing a stick zither. The gourd at the top of the broken-off instrument is on her left breast.

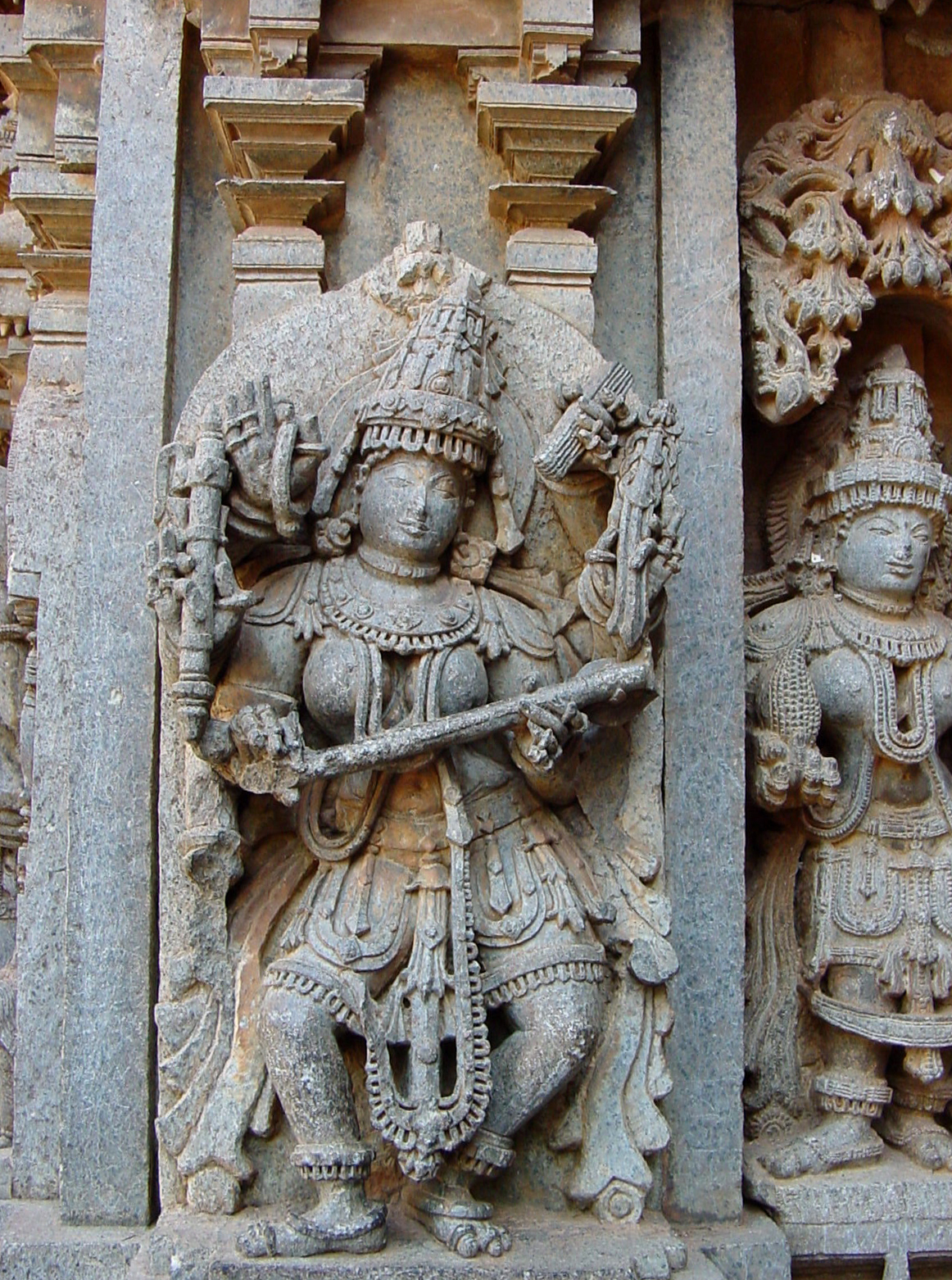
India, Keshava temple, ca. 13th century C.E. Saraswati playing a stick zither.

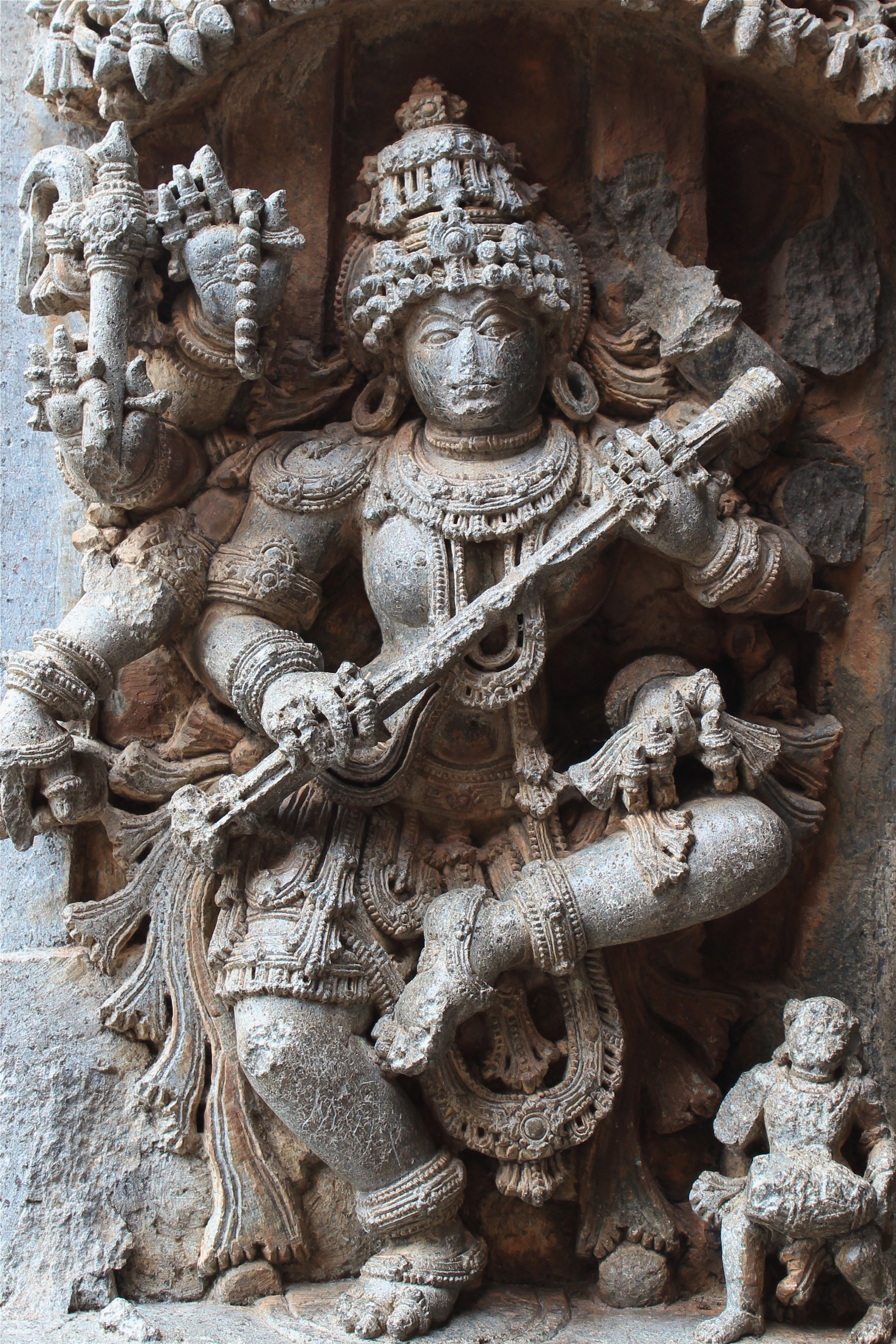
India, Chennakesava temple, ca. 12th century. Saraswati with stick-zither vina

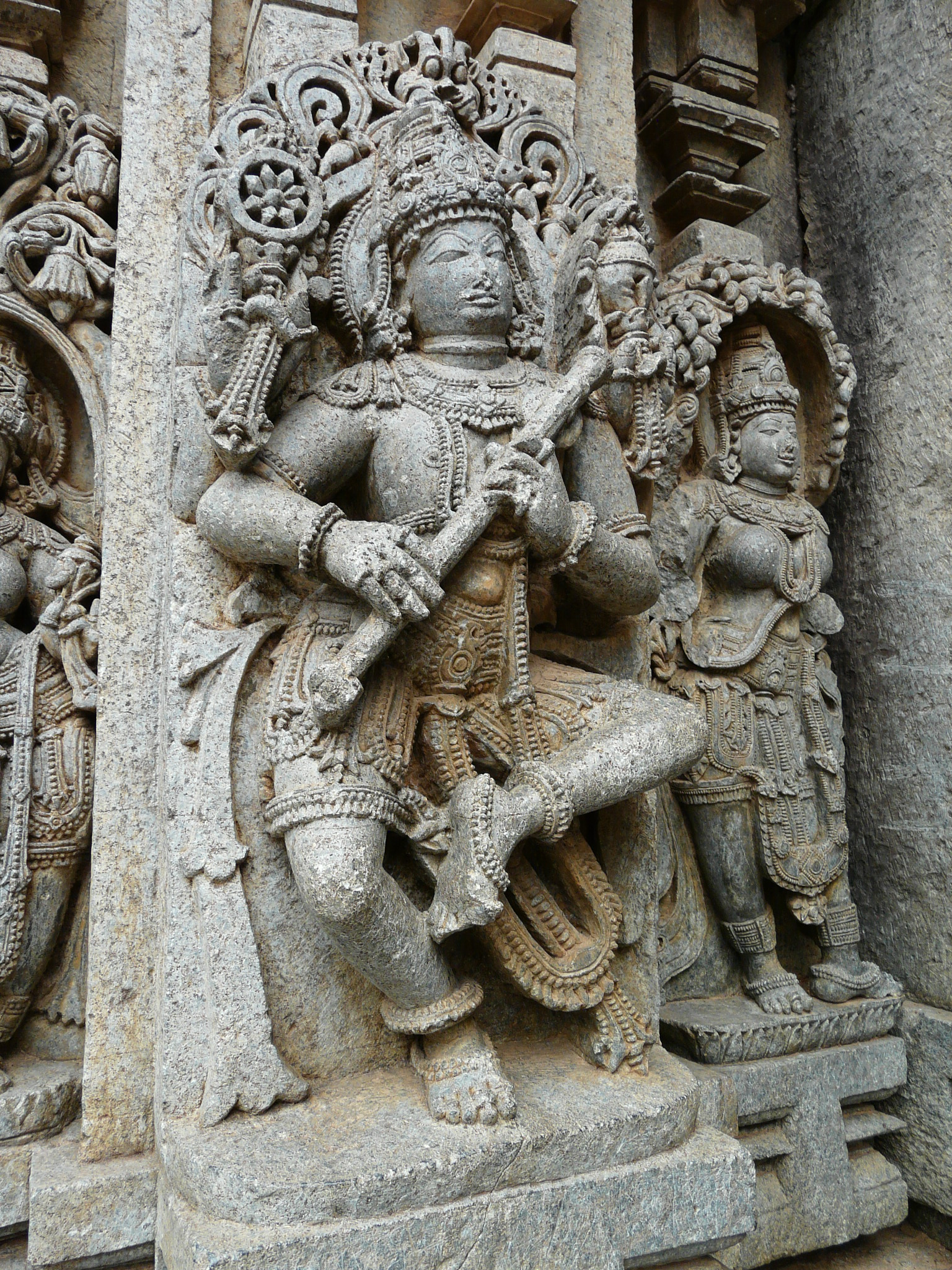
Somanathapur, India. Chennakesava Temple, ca. 12th-13th century. Krishna dancing with a stick-zither vina.

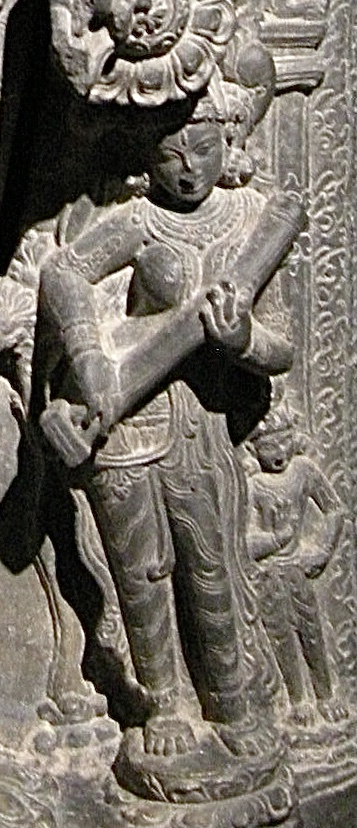
Saraswati with an alapini vina or possibly eka-tantri vina. The instrument has no apparent resonator except the thick tube of the body. Alapini vinas tended to have narrower tubes.

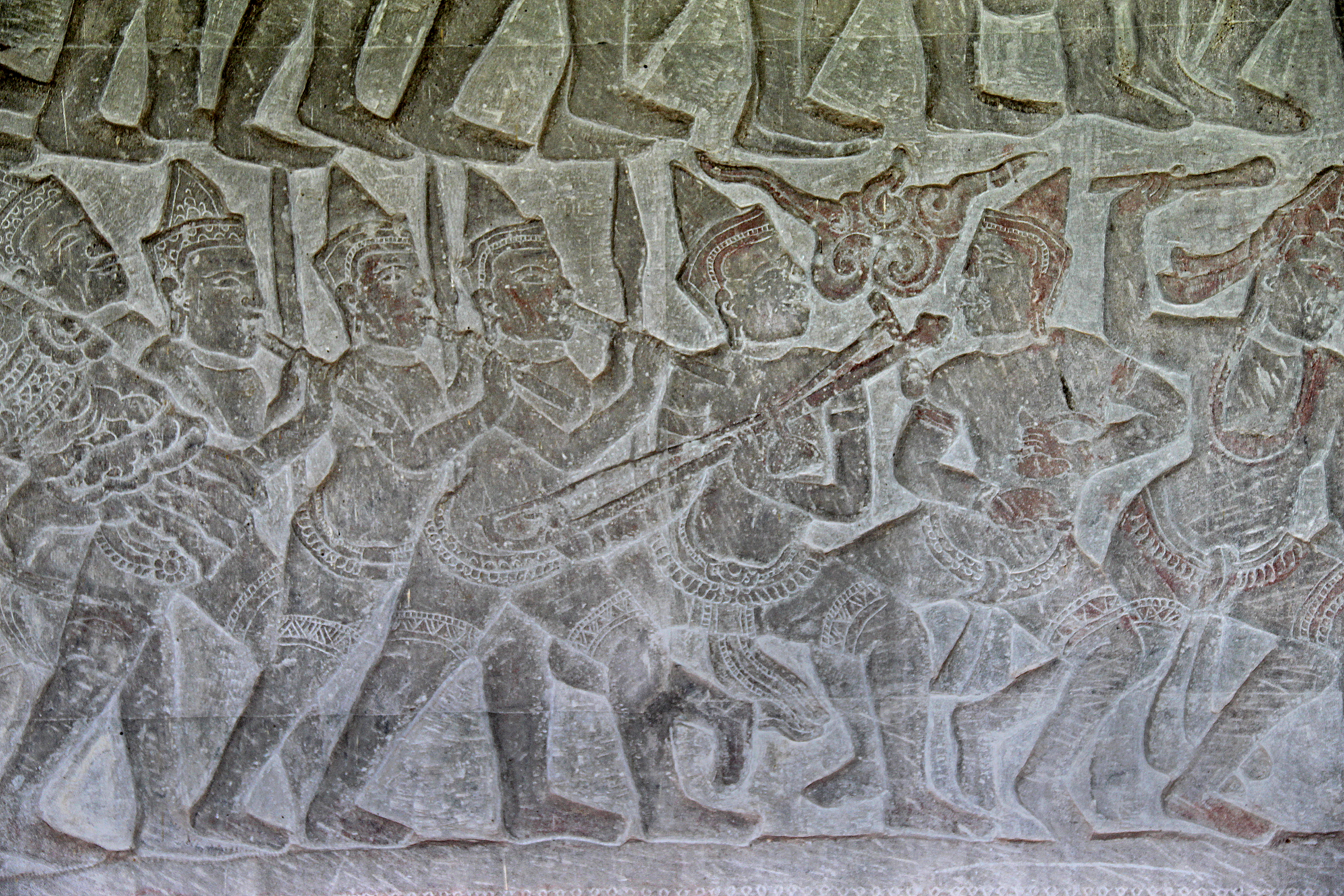
Angkor Wat, 16th century AD, showing a musician playing a kse diev.

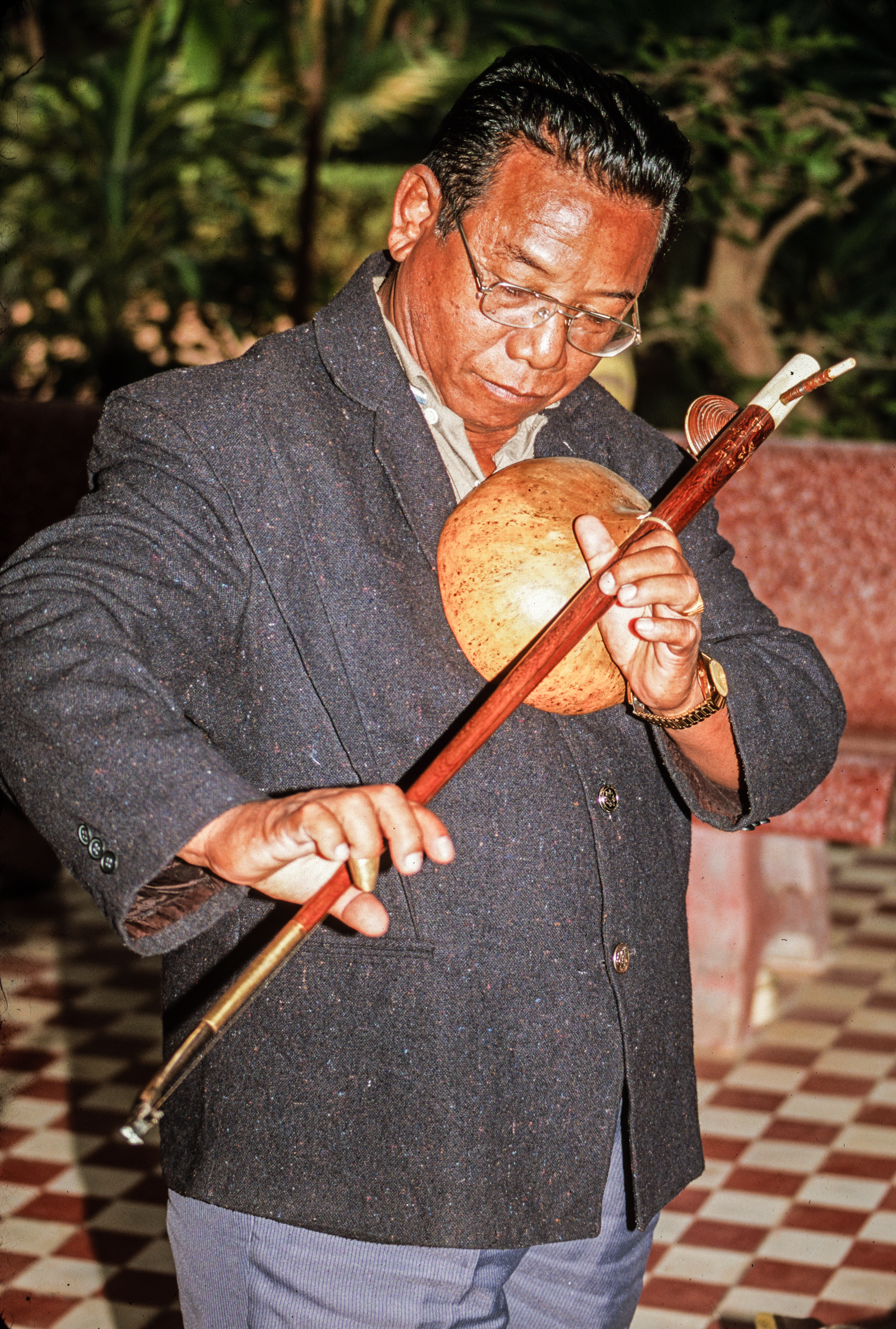
Modern kse diev
