= List of musical instruments by Hornbostel–Sachs number: 32 =

This is a list of instruments by Hornbostel-Sachs number, covering those instruments that are classified under 32 under that system. This category includes all string instruments in which the resonator cannot be removed without resulting in the destruction of the instrument, labelled as composite chordophones.

3: Instruments in which sound is produced by one or more vibrating strings (chordophones, string instruments).

32: Instruments in which the resonator and string bearer are physically united and can not be separated without destroying the instrument

321: Instruments in which the strings run in a plane parallel to the sound table (lutes)

321.1: Instruments in which each string has its own flexible carrier (bow lutes)
321.2: Instruments in which the string is attached to a yoke that consists of a cross-bar and two arms, with the yoke lying in the same plane as the sound-table (lyres or yoke lutes)

321.21: Instruments in which the resonator is bowl-shaped, either carved or natural
321.22: Instruments in which the resonator is a built-up wooden box

321.3: Instruments in which the string bearer is a plain handle (handle lutes)

321.31: Instruments in which the handle passes diametrically through or over the resonator (spike lutes)

321.311: Instrument with a resonator made from a bowl, either natural or carved (spike bowl lutes)
321.312: Instruments in which the resonator is in the form of a box (spike box lutes, spike guitars)
321.313: Instrument in which the handle passes diametrically through the walls of a tube (where the depth of the body exceeds the radius of the membrane) (spike tube lutes)
321.314: Instrument in which the handle passes diametrically through the walls of a circular frame (where the depth of the body does not exceed the radius of the membrane). (spike frame lutes)

321.32: Instrument in which the handle is attached to, or carved from, the resonator, like a neck (necked lutes)

321.321: Instrument whose body is shaped like a bowl (necked bowl lutes)
321.322: Instrument whose body is shaped like a box (necked box lutes)

321.33: Instrument in which the handle extends into but does not pass completely through the resonator (tanged lutes)

321.331: Instrument whose body is shaped like a bowl (tanged bowl lutes)

322: Instrument whose strings are at right angles to the sound table, such that a line between the lower tips of the strings would point at the neck (harps)

322.1: Instrument without a pillar (open harps)

322.11: Instrument has a neck that curves away from the resonator (arched harp)
322.12: Instrument has a neck that sharply angles away from the resonator (angular harps)

322.2: Instrument has a pillar (frame harps)

322.21: Instrument has no tuning action

322.211: Instrument is diatonic
322.212: Instrument is chromatic

322.212.1: Instrument has strings in one plane
322.212.2: Instrument has strings in two planes which cross each other

322.22: Instrument has tuning action

322.221: Instrument can be tuned with hand levers
322.222: Instrument can be tuned with pedal-operated levers

323: Instrument has strings that lay at right angles to the sound table, so that a line joining the lower tips of the strings would be perpendicular to the neck, and the instrument has a notched bridge.

These instruments may be classified with a suffix, based on how the strings are caused to vibrate.

- 4: Hammers or beaters
- 5: Bare hands and fingers
- 6: Plectrum
- 7: Bowing
  - 71: Using a bow
  - 72: Using a wheel
  - 73: Using a ribbon
- 8: Keyboard
- 9: Using a mechanical drive

== List ==
=== 321. Lutes ===
- Balalaikas
- Bandura
- Banjos
  - Banjo
  - Bluegress banjo
  - Plectrum banjo
  - Tenor banjo
- Bouzoukis
- Charangos
  - Charango
  - Charangon
  - Hatun charango
  - Hualaycho
  - Ronroco
- Đàn đáy
- Đàn nguyệt
- Đàn tỳ bà
- Domras
- Cittern
- Guitars:
  - Baritone guitar
  - Bass guitar
  - Classical guitar
  - Electric guitar
  - Flamenco guitar
  - Lap Steel guitar
  - Steel guitar
- Hurdy gurdy
- Lutes
  - Archlute
  - Lute
  - Theorbo
- Kobza
- Lyre
- Laud
- Mandolins
  - Mandola
  - Mandolin
  - Octave mandolin
  - Mandocello
  - Mandobass
- Nyckelharpa
- Pipa
- Shamisen/samisen/sangen
- Sitar
- Torban
- Ukuleles
- Vina
- Viols
  - Viola da gamba
- Violins
  - Fiddle
  - Hardanger fiddle
  - Vertical viola (and other members of the violin octet family)
  - Viola
  - Viola d'amore
  - Violin
  - Cello
  - Double Bass
- Zhongruan

=== 322. Harps ===
- Harp
  - Ancient Greek harp
  - African harp
  - Celtic harp
  - Concert harp

=== 323. Harp lutes ===
- Kora

=== Undefined ===
- Geomungo/komungo
- Khim
- Kutiyapi/kutyapi/kutiapi
- Sarangi
- Vielle
- Washtub bass
- Xalam (or khalam)
