= List of musical instruments by Hornbostel–Sachs number: 321.314 =

This is a list of instruments by Hornbostel-Sachs number, covering those instruments that are classified under 321.314 under that system. These instruments may be known as spike frame lutes.

3: Instruments in which sound is produced by one or more vibrating strings (chordophones, string instruments).

32: Instruments in which the resonator and string bearer are physically united and can not be separated without destroying the instrument

321: Instruments in which the strings run in a plane parallel to the sound table (lutes)

321.3: Instruments in which the string bearer is a plain handle (handle lutes)

321.31: Instruments in which the handle passes diametrically through or over the resonator (spike lutes)

321.314: Instrument in which the handle passes diametrically through the walls of a circular frame (where the depth of the body does not exceed the radius of the membrane). (spike frame lutes)

These instruments may be classified with a suffix, based on how the strings are caused to vibrate.

- 4: Hammers or beaters
- 5: Bare hands and fingers
- 6: Plectrum
- 7: Bowing
  - 71: Using a bow
  - 72: Using a wheel
  - 73: Using a ribbon
- 8: Keyboard
- 9: Using a mechanical drive

== List ==
Instrument	Tradition	Hornbostel–Sachs classification	Description
Banjo (open backed)	Music of the United States, African-American music	321.314	Four or five stringed instrument, plucked with a bare thumb and a forefinger covered by a metal thimble, traditionally with four or five strings
