= Tro (instrument) =

Traditional bowed string instruments from Cambodia

Tro (ទ្រ)
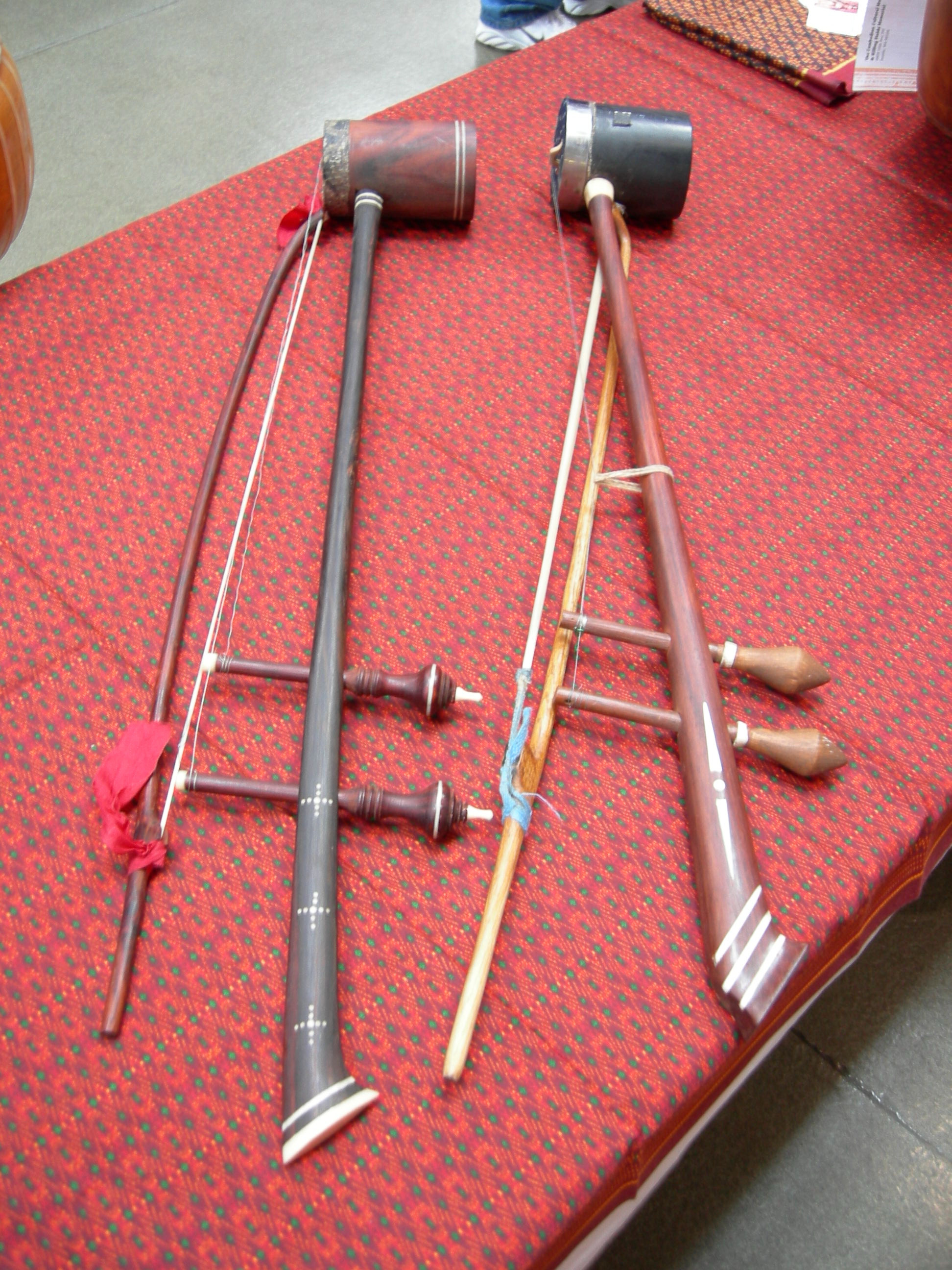
- Two tro fiddles with cylinder-shaped resonance chambers. Bows are laid with the instruments, passing between fiddle strings and not separated without taking the strings loose.
- Classification: Bowed string instrument
- Hornbostel–Sachs classification: 321.311.71; 321.313.71 (*321.311.71: Spike bowl lutes. Stringed musical instruments with a plain handle passing through and protruding from the bottom of a permanently attached, bowl-shaped resonator, played with a bow.; 321.313.71: Spike tube lutes. Stringed musical instruments with a plain handle passing through a permanently attached resonator through the sides, played with a bow.)

Related instruments
- The tro ou is similar to the: Saw u, Thailand; Yehu, China; Đàn gáo, Vietnam; The tro saus are similar to the: Saw duang, Thailand; Haegeum, Korea; Huqin, China; Kokyū, Japan; Erhu, China; Đàn nhị, Vietnam; Cò ke, Vietnam (Muong people); Been, indigenous one stringed fiddle of Assam Plains

The tro (Khmer: ទ្រ) is Cambodia's traditional spike fiddle, a bowed string instrument that is held and played vertically. Spike fiddles have a handle that passes through the resonator, often forming a spike, on the bottom side where it emerges. The family is similar or distantly related to the Chinese erhu or huqin. The instruments have a soundbox at the bottom of the stick, covered with leather or snake skin. Strings run from pegs at the top of the stick and secured at the bottom, running across the soundbox. The larger the soundbox, the lower the pitch range. Instruments in this family include the two-stringed tro ou, tro sau thom, tro sau toch and tro che, as well as the three-stringed tro Khmer spike fiddle. The two-stringed tros are tuned in a fifth, while the three-stringed tro Khmer is tuned in fourths. The tros, with the exception of the tro Khmer, are strung so that the bowstring is permanently placed between the two stings. When the musician plays, the placement of the bow causes the strings to be played at once, one from below and one from above. In contrast, western fiddles (such as the violin) are played with the bow pushing on each string from the outside, as is also the case with the tro khmer.

== Tro family of fiddles ==
The tro u (Khmer: ទ្រអ៊ូ; also spelled tro ou) is a traditional instrument from Cambodia that dates back at least as far as the "Lungvek period," about 1528–1594, and is the lowest pitched tro, with strings tuned in a 5th, approximately C—G. The resonator bowl is constructed from a round-bodied coconut shell that has one end covered with animal skin, such as snake or calfskin. Its two strings are made of silk (not as common now), gut, nylon, or metal, running over a bridge made of bamboo or wood. The coconut may have designs carved into its back-side. It is similar to the Thai saw u, Vietnamese đàn gáo and the Chinese yehu, although the latter instrument has a wooden rather than animal skin face.

Played in the mohori and ayai ensembles. May be used in the Bassac theater orchestra.

The tro ou chamhieng (ទ្រអ៊ូចំហៀង) is played "exclusively" by Cham who live in Cambodia and has a sound-bowl resonator made from a turtle shell. It is played in the Bassac theater orchestra and the yike orchestra. It originally came from the kanyi - fiddle of Cham people in Vietnam. The body of the kanyi is made of a golden tortoise shell. On the body of the golden tortoise shell, there is a small piece of bamboo about the size of a big toe, about 0.65 cm long. At the beginning of this bamboo segment, there are two rods to pull the rope called two kanyi pegs. From two pull rods (two ears) connected to the bamboo by a string is the main string of kanyi. In addition, this pull rod is connected to the bamboo with ponytail that bends like a bow. This is the string that pulls the kanyi to make the sound.

The tro sau (ទ្រសោធំ) or tro sau thom is a bowed stringed instrument from Cambodia, with metal strings tuned in a 5th, approximately D—A. The thom is the larger and lower-pitched tro sau; thom means "big" in Khmer. The cylindrical sound box is approximately 120 mm long and 90mm across the skin head. The neck can measure 620mm long. It is made from black wood but more basic materials were used, such as a hollow bamboo and a tortoise shell. It is used in Cambodian classical music ensembles, the arak, kar, mohori and ayai. It is not the lead instrument in these ensembles.

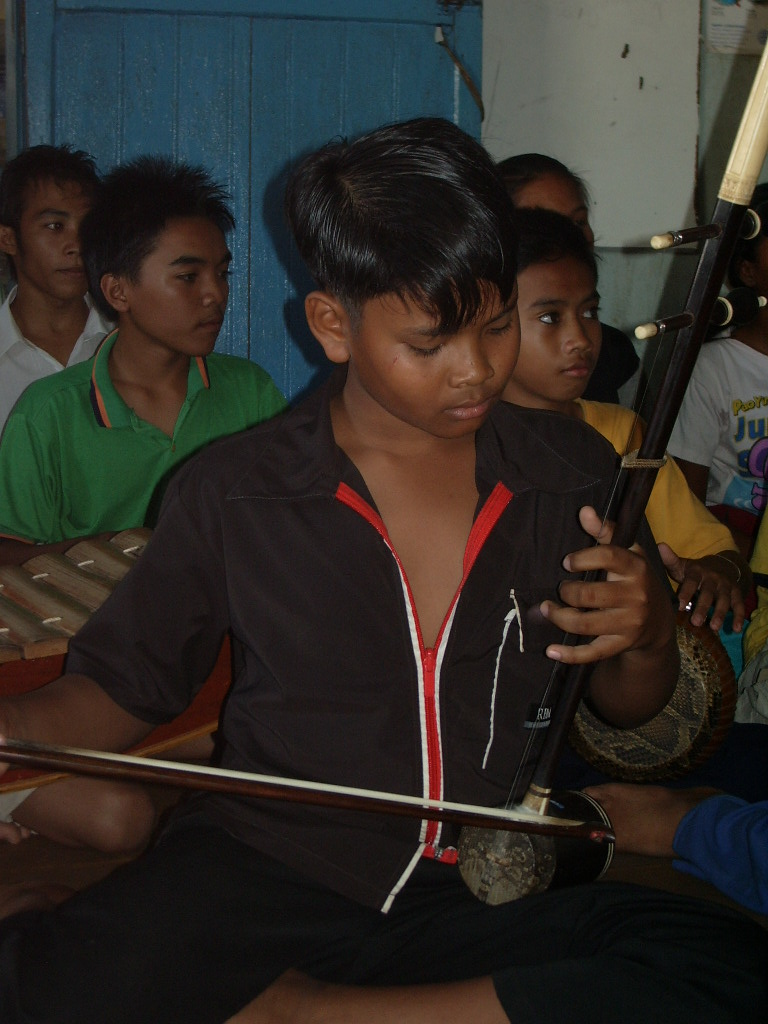
Possibly the trou sau toch (small tro), tro sau thom (big tro), or the tro che.

The tro sau toch (ទ្រសោធំ តូច) is a Cambodian instrument used in Khmer classical music. It is a two-string vertical fiddle with a hardwood body. The word toch (តូច) means "small." The sound box (a cylinder) can measure 80mm wide by 115mm long, the neck 760mm. Measurements are approximate as the instruments are not standardized. It is equivalent to the Thai Saw duang. Its two metal strings are tuned in 5ths, G—D, higher than the larger tro sau thom.

It is used in Cambodian classical music ensembles, the arak, kar, mohori and ayai, as the lead instrument.

The tro che or tro chhe (ទ្រឆេ) is a member of the tro family of 2-stringed Cambodian fiddles, the smallest member of the tro family. Its two metal strings are tuned D—A, an octave above the tro sau thom and the highest of the tros. Instrument tunings are approximate in the Cambodian ensembles, and change with key instruments such as the sralay; when the instrument is played in the bassack theatre orchestra (paired with the tro ou instead of tri sau thom, the tro che be tuned the same as the Tro u, one octave higher.

Like most of the other members of the family, it is a two stringed instrument. Formerly, silk strings were standard, but now metal wire or cable is used. The resonating chamber, a cylinder, is made of hardwood or ivory. There are no standard sizes; however the resonating chamber can be 65–70 mm across and 105 mm long. The skin soundboard, is made of snakeskin or pangolin hide.

== Gallery ==
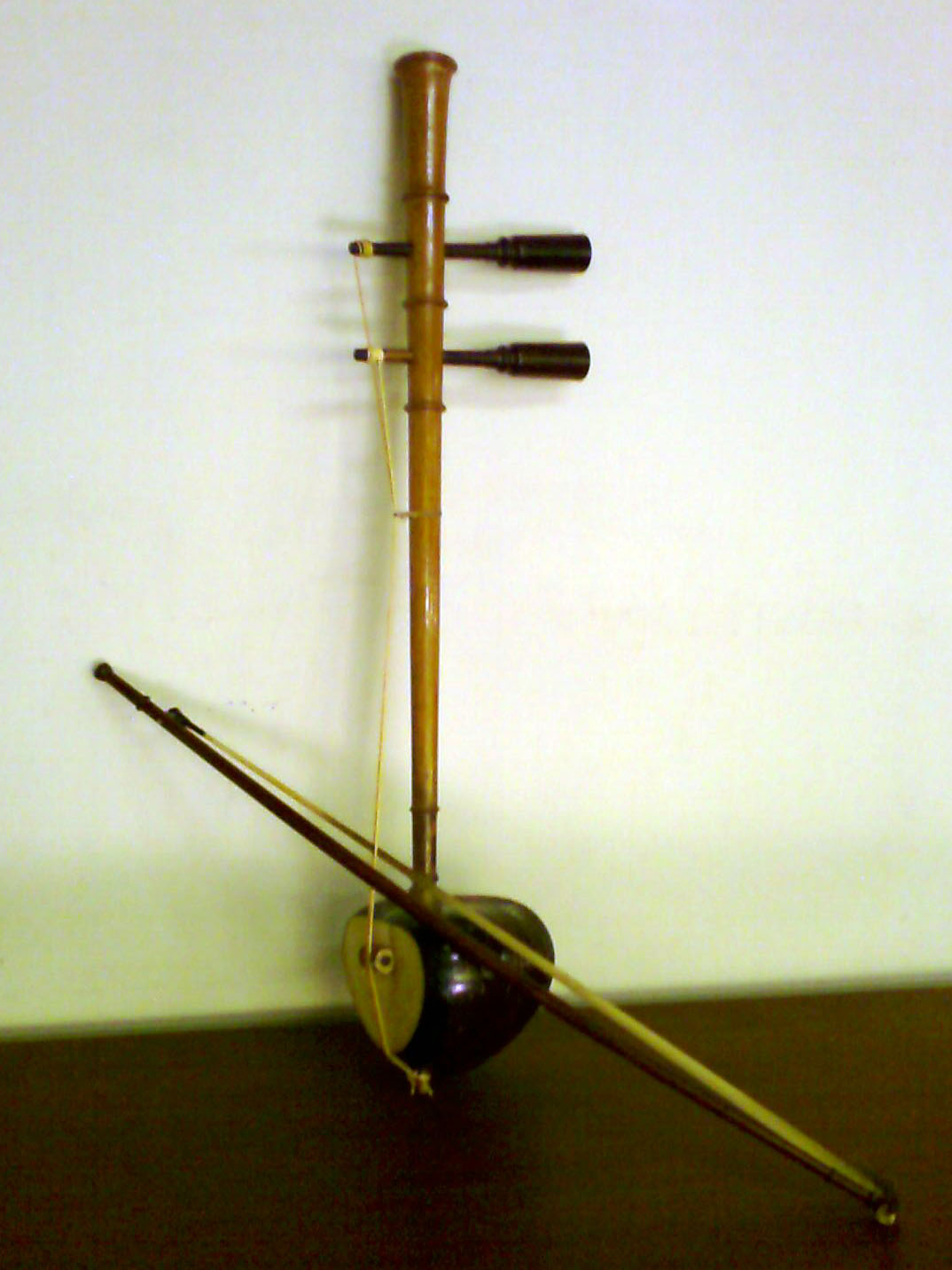
Saw u, equivalent to the tro ou. Both the Cambodian and Thai instruments use a coconut shell for the instrument's body, covered with skin for the soundboard.

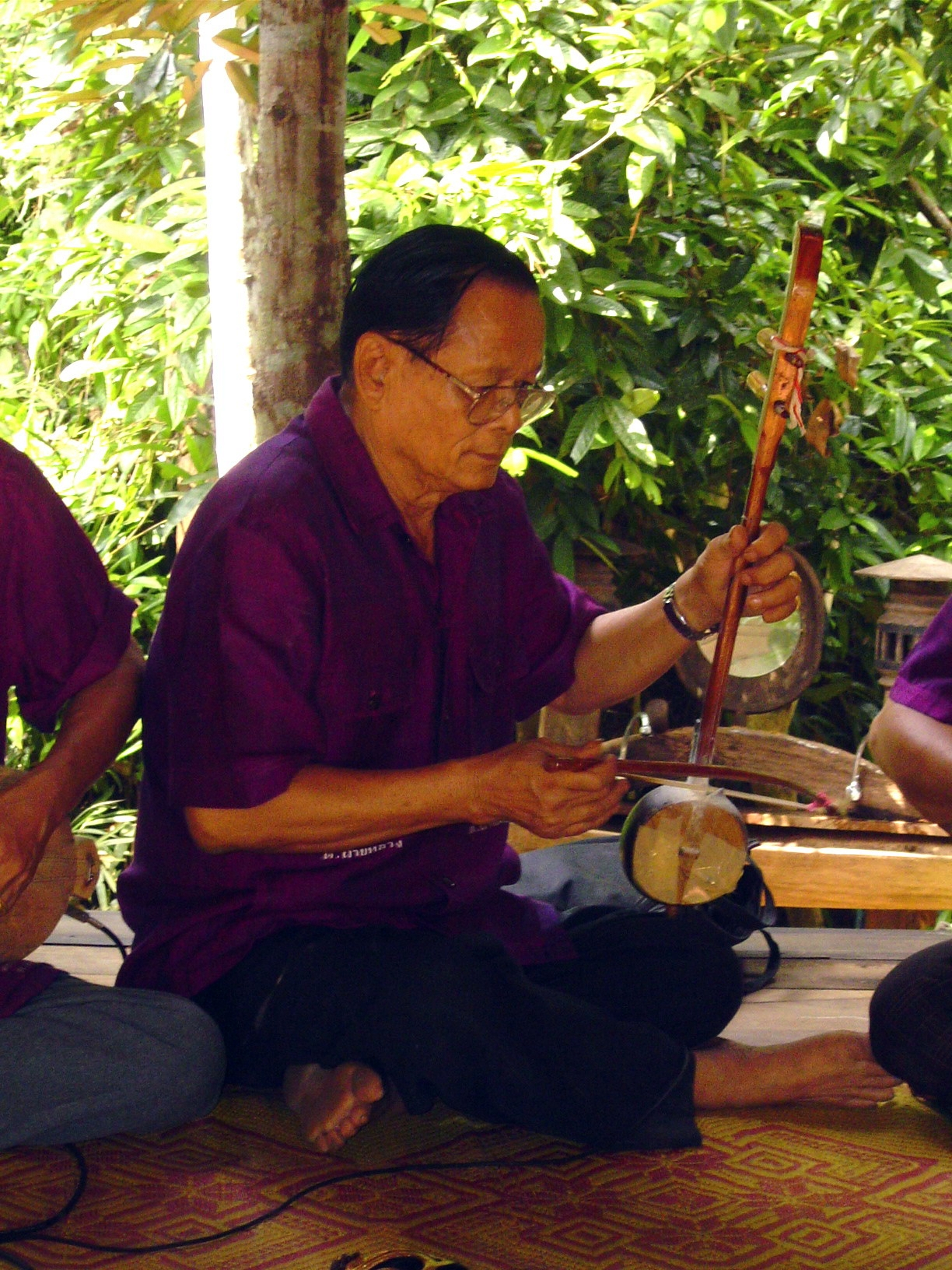
A Thai saw u, equivalent to the tro u.

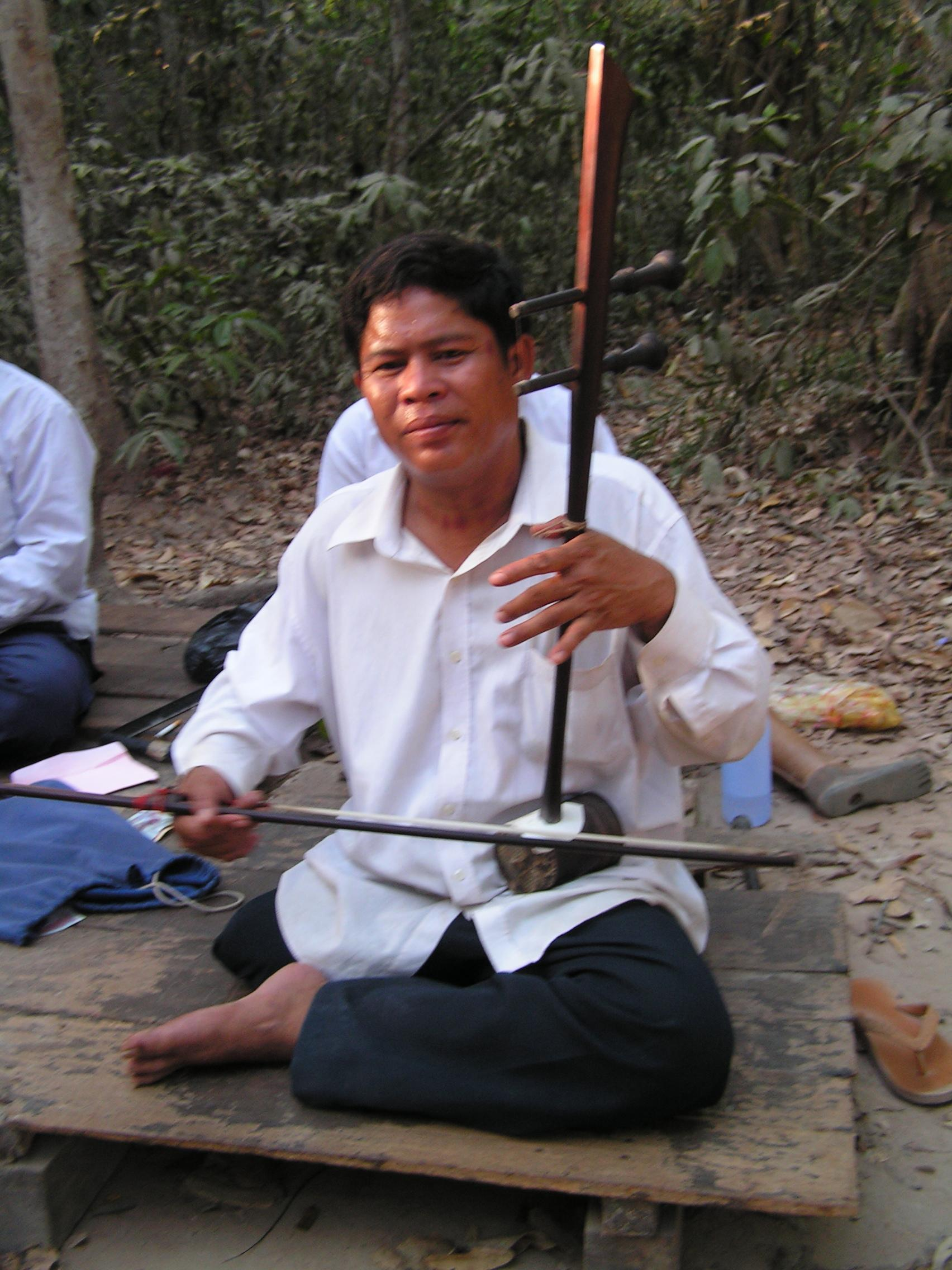
An unnamed tro sau, possibly the trou sau toch (small tro), tro sau thom (big tro), or the tro che

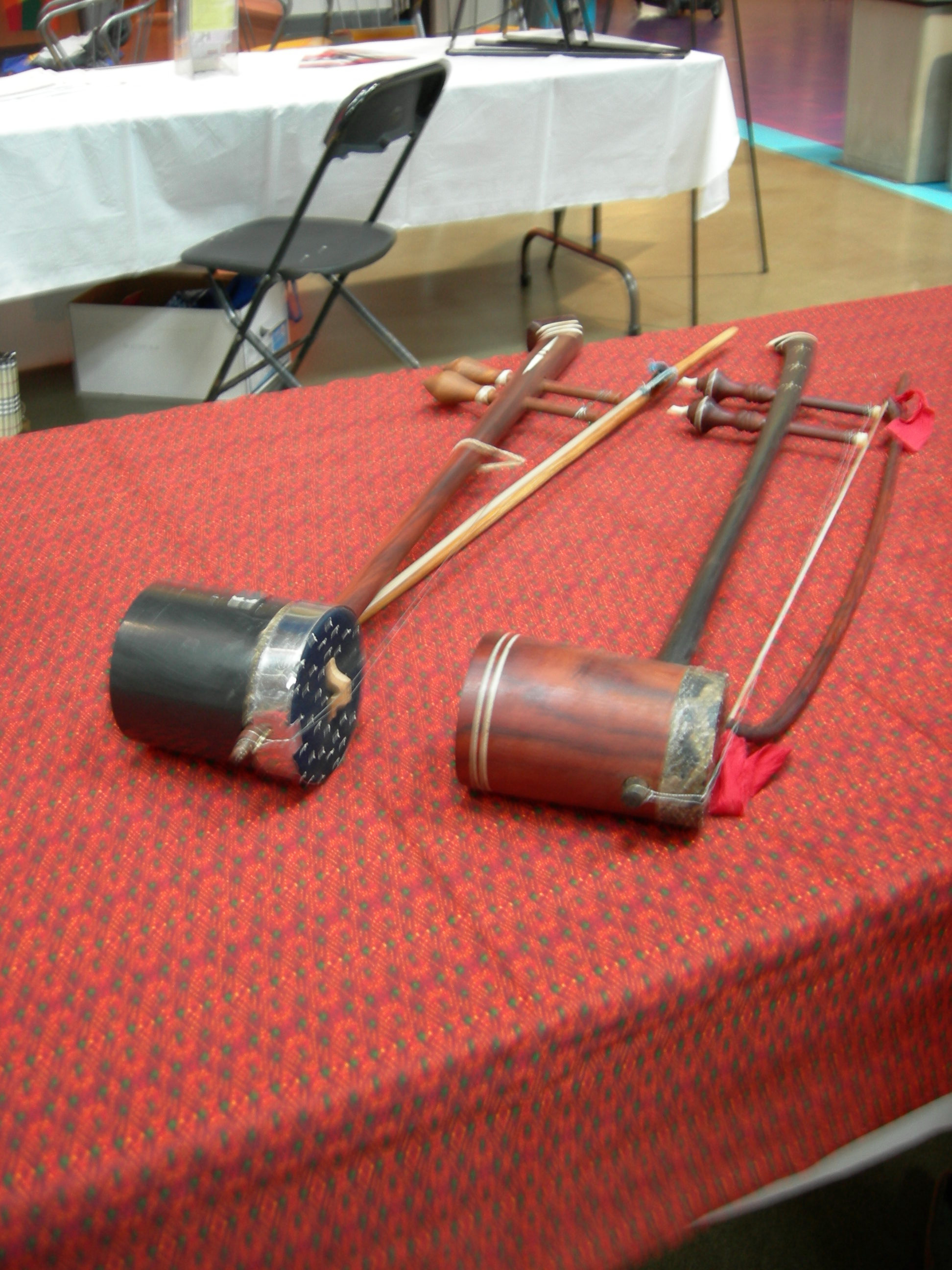
Two tro saus with cylinder soundboxes. The instrument on the right has a snakeskin head.

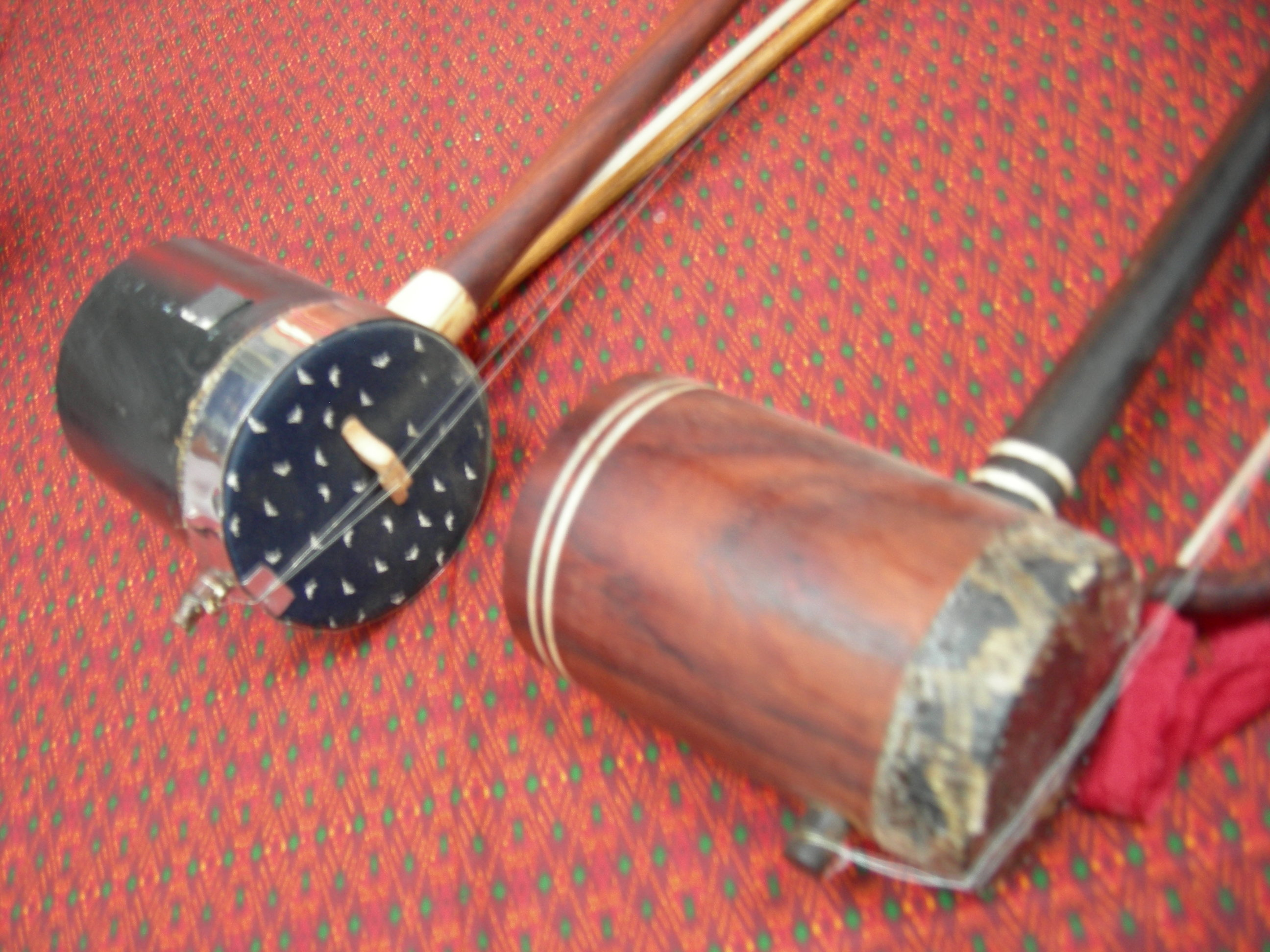
Two tro saus. The vestigial spike (with strings attached) pokes through the bottom of the resonator.

== See also ==
- Traditional Cambodian musical instruments
- Tro Khmer
- Music of Cambodia
- Huqin
