= List of musical instruments by Hornbostel–Sachs number: 322.221 =

This is a list of instruments by Hornbostel-Sachs number, covering those instruments that are classified under 322.221 under that system. These instruments are board zithers that use slats as resonators.

3: Instruments in which sound is produced by one or more vibrating strings (chordophones, string instruments).

32: Instruments in which the resonator and string bearer are physically united and can not be separated without destroying the instrument

322: Instrument whose strings are at right angles to the sound table, such that a line between the lower tips of the strings would point at the neck (harps)

322.2: Instrument has a pillar (frame harps)

322.22: Instrument has tuning action

322.221: Instrument can be tuned with hand levers

These instruments may be classified with a suffix, based on how the strings are caused to vibrate.

- 4: Hammers or beaters
- 5: Bare hands and fingers
- 6: Plectrum
- 7: Bowing
  - 71: Using a bow
  - 72: Using a wheel
  - 73: Using a ribbon
- 8: Keyboard
- 9: Using a mechanical drive

== List ==
Instrument	Tradition	Hornbostel–Sachs classification	Description
clárseach cláirsach (Scottish), cruit	Ireland	322.221	Polychord wire-strung harp with a fore-pillar
