= Todd Taylor (banjo player) =

American five string banjo player

Todd Taylor is an American five-string banjo player. He held the Guinness World Records title for "world's fastest banjo" until the record was beaten by Johnny Butten. In a demonstration of his speed, he played "Dueling Banjos" by himself on January 31, 2007, at an event by the previously mentioned world record book.

== Career ==
Todd Taylor began touring the Bluegrass circuit with his brother; together they were known as The Taylor Twins. He has played and toured with other notable bluegrass players including Bill Monroe, Carl Story, Jim & Jesse. Taylor became the first banjo player to take the Banjo to the Rock-n-Roll worldwide Top-40 countdown, with his remake of the classic rock tune "Free Bird". Taylor is a four-time Grammy Award nominee.

In 2018, the State Legislature of South Carolina designated March 14 as "South Carolina Banjo Day" in honor of Taylor.

== Notable appearances ==
- Live with Regis and Kathy Lee: "Banjo and guitar picking sensations, the Taylor Twins, will perform this Thursday on the daytime television show, 'Live With Regis & Kathie.'"

== Discography ==
- Something Different (2000)
- Fast Ride (2000)
- Blazing Bluegrass Banjo (2003)
- Taylor Made (2005)
- 3-five-N (2006)
- Bringin' It... Home (2008)
- Diversity (2010)
