= List of musical instruments by Hornbostel–Sachs number: 321.313 =

This is a list of instruments by Hornbostel-Sachs number, covering those instruments that are classified under 321.313 under that system. These instruments may be known as spike tube lutes.

3: Instruments in which sound is produced by one or more vibrating strings (chordophones, string instruments).

32: Instruments in which the resonator and string bearer are physically united and can not be separated without destroying the instrument

321: Instruments in which the strings run in a plane parallel to the sound table (lutes)

321.3: Instruments in which the string bearer is a plain handle (handle lutes)

321.31: Instruments in which the handle passes diametrically through or over the resonator (spike lutes)

321.313: Instrument in which the handle passes diametrically through the walls of a tube (where the depth of the body exceeds the radius of the membrane) (spike tube lutes)

These instruments may be classified with a suffix, based on how the strings are caused to vibrate.

- 4: Hammers or beaters
- 5: Bare hands and fingers
- 6: Plectrum
- 7: Bowing
  - 71: Using a bow
  - 72: Using a wheel
  - 73: Using a ribbon
- 8: Keyboard
- 9: Using a mechanical drive

== List ==
Instrument	Tradition	Hornbostel–Sachs classification	Description
erhu	China	321.313-71	Spike tube lute
endingidi	Uganda	321.313	Spike tube lute
khuuchir	Mongolia	321.313-71	Spike tube lute
tro sau thom	Cambodia	321.313	Spike tube lute
tro sau toch	Cambodia	321.313	Spike tube lute
tro che	Cambodia	321.313	Spike tube lute
sihu argil khuuchir	China, Mongolia	321.313-71	Spike tube lute
