= The Well Pennies =

American folk-pop music duo

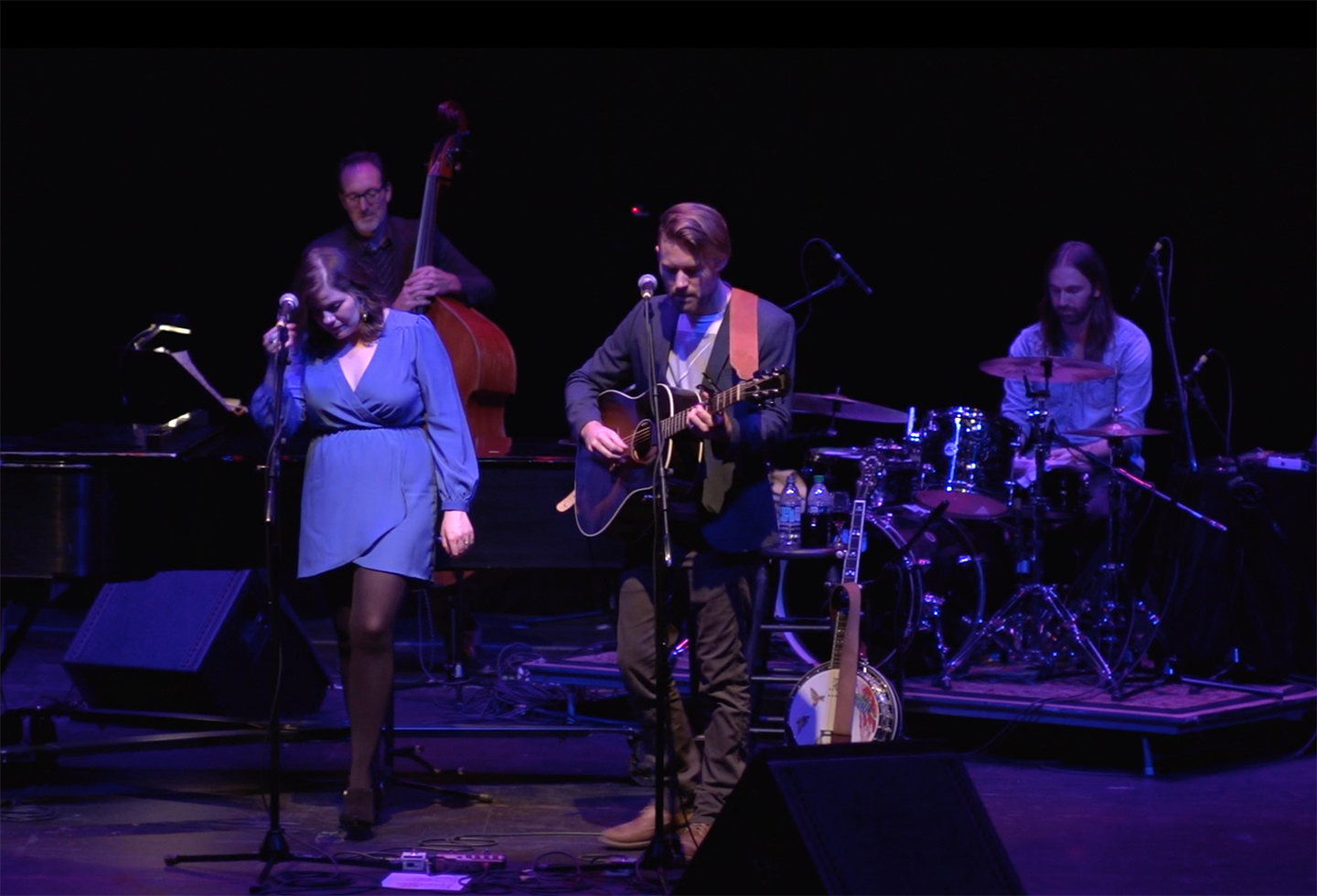
- The Well Pennies in 2015

Background information
- Origin: Northborough, MA, U.S.
- Genres: Folk, pop
- Years active: 2011-present
- Label: Golden Bear Records
- Members: Bryan Vanderpool; Sarah Vanderpool
- Website: thewellpennies.com

The Well Pennies are an American folk-pop music duo, formed in 2011. The band consists of husband-and-wife Bryan and Sarah Vanderpool.

== History ==
=== Formation ===
The Well Pennies were formed in Northborough, Massachusetts, later relocating to Los Angeles, California, and eventually to Des Moines, Iowa. Bryan and Sarah met at a coffee shop in Northborough, where Sarah was working. They started out occasionally supporting each other's solo acts, before deciding to form The Well Pennies. The band name comes from a line in the Tom Waits song "The Fall of Troy", where he sings, "The well is full of pennies."

=== Debut EP and Endlings ===
The Well Pennies released their debut self-titled EP in 2012. The following year, their version of "All My Loving", a reworking of the 1964 song as a ballad, was featured on The Beatles covers album, Beatles Reimagined, which also includes cover versions by Edward Sharpe and the Magnetic Zeros, Leftover Cuties, and others.

They released their debut full-length album, Endlings, on January 27, 2015, featuring acoustic instrumentation and vocal harmonies, with the up-tempo lead single "Drive". The single was inspired by a road trip the Vanderpools took when moving from Boston to Los Angeles. The Endlings track "The Echo & the Shadow" is the closing theme for the Spanish television talk show En la tuya o en la mía. Billboard magazine columnist Gary Trust named Endlings one of his top three albums of 2015.

In October 2015, The Well Pennies performed in Anchorage, Alaska, alongside the Anchorage Youth Orchestra which spurred a series of shows where the band collaborated with youth orchestras. The Well Pennies were also the opening act for Diana Krall for part of her "Turn Up The Quiet World Tour".

=== Murmurations and a Move to the Midwest ===
The Well Pennies relocated to Des Moines in the summer of 2016 after 7 years in Los Angeles and started the record label and recording studio, Golden Bear Records. They signed Boston-based artist Kaiti Jones and produced the album Vows, which was released November 17, 2017.

The Well Pennies sophomore LP, Murmurations was released on February 25, 2019, featuring the single Ooh La La, which No Depression called "...folk/pop perfection". The album's second single and music video, Oh My Blue Sky was premiered by Billboard Magazine which described it as "...the joyful, try-not-to-handclap-along-you-can't 'Oh My Blue Sky' from Murmurations." The band explained, "The song was written as an encouragement for when we're feeling discouraged or worried or just struggling while we try to figure out who we are and what place we have in the world."

=== Covers ===
During the early months of the 2020 pandemic, the band posted regular videos of cover songs, requested from fans. On October 30, they released Covers, the band's 3rd full-length album. Covers was included in several "best of" lists, including from No Depression. "...The song choices are delightfully quirky and delightfully rendered, tied together only by Sarah and Bryan Vanderpool’s evident love for each selection and ability to take each somewhere surprising." The music video for Stressed out featured masked ballet dancers in popular New York City tourist locations, subsequently deserted due to the COVID-19 pandemic shut down.

== Members ==
- Bryan Vanderpool – vocals, banjo, guitar, mandolin, percussion
- Sarah Vanderpool – vocals, piano, accordion

== Additional Live Band Members ==
- Tony Green – bass
- Tim Weed – violin, viola
- Christian Hogan – drumset

== Discography ==
=== Albums ===
- Endlings (2015)
- Murmurations (2019)
- Covers (2020)

=== Extended plays ===
- The Well Pennies (2012)

=== Singles ===
- "Jingle Bells" (2012)
- "Drive" (2014)
- "Ooh La La" (2017)
- "Wedding Song" (2018)

=== Compilations ===
- "All My Loving" on Beatles Reimagined (Community Projects, 2013)

=== Television soundtracks ===
- "Home Is In My Heart" - Twisted (ABC Family, season 1, episode 5, July 9, 2013)
- "Home Is In My Heart" - Switched at Birth (ABC Family, season 2, episode 18, July 29, 2013)
- "The Echo & the Shadow" - True Blood (HBO, season 7, episode 9, August 17, 2014)
- "The Echo & the Shadow" - The Fosters (ABC Family, season 2, episode 15, February 9, 2015)
- "The Echo & the Shadow" - Switched at Birth (ABC Family, season 4, episode 14, September 14, 2015)
- "The Echo & the Shadow" - En la tuya o en la mía (2015–16)
- "Worldshaker" - Here and Now (HBO, episode 108, May 14, 2018)
- "The Echo & the Shadow" - Roswell, New Mexico (The CW, season 2, episode 13, June 15, 2020)
- "Jingle Bells" - Deliver By Christmas (Hallmark, Oct 25th, 2020)
- "Ooh La La" - Atypical (Netflix, season 4, episode 10, July 9, 2021)
