= List of musical instruments by Hornbostel–Sachs number: 322.212.1 =

This is a list of instruments by Hornbostel-Sachs number, covering those instruments that are classified under 322.212.1 under that system. These instruments are chromatic frame harps with strings in one plane.

3: Instruments in which sound is produced by one or more vibrating strings (chordophones, string instruments).

32: Instruments in which the resonator and string bearer are physically united and can not be separated without destroying the instrument

322: Instrument whose strings are at right angles to the sound table, such that a line between the lower tips of the strings would point at the neck (harps)

322.2: Instrument has a pillar (frame harps)

322.21: Instrument has no tuning action

322.212: Instrument is chromatic

322.212.1: Instrument has strings in one plane

These instruments may be classified with a suffix, based on how the strings are caused to vibrate.

- 4: Hammers or beaters
- 5: Bare hands and fingers
- 6: Plectrum
- 7: Bowing
  - 71: Using a bow
  - 72: Using a wheel
  - 73: Using a ribbon
- 8: Keyboard
- 9: Using a mechanical drive

== List ==
| Instrument | Tradition | Hornbostel–Sachs classification | Description |
|---|---|---|---|
| harp, triple telyn | Wales | 322.212.1 | Harp with no blades or levers, with three rows of strings, the outer two tuned in a diatonic scale and the inner one tuned to the extra semitones of the chromatic scale |
