= List of musical instruments by Hornbostel–Sachs number: 322.12 =

This is a list of instruments by Hornbostel-Sachs number, covering those instruments that are classified under 322.12 under that system. These instruments may be known as angular harps.

3: Instruments in which sound is produced by one or more vibrating strings (chordophones, string instruments).

32: Instruments in which the resonator and string bearer are physically united and can not be separated without destroying the instrument

322: Instrument whose strings are at right angles to the sound table, such that a line between the lower tips of the strings would point at the neck (harps)

322.1: Instrument without a pillar (open harps)

322.12: Instrument has a neck that sharply angles away from the resonator (angular harps)

These instruments may be classified with a suffix, based on how the strings are caused to vibrate.

- 4: Hammers or beaters
- 5: Bare hands and fingers
- 6: Plectrum
- 7: Bowing
  - 71: Using a bow
  - 72: Using a wheel
  - 73: Using a ribbon
- 8: Keyboard
- 9: Using a mechanical drive

== List ==
Instrument	Tradition	Hornbostel–Sachs classification	Description
Assyrian harp	Assyrian	{{{Number}}}	Oldest-documented angular harp
brnt	Egypt	322.12	Used in widely varying forms, though originally semi-circular and with five to seven strings, number of strings increased over time, while the size decreased
chang	Persian	322.12	Angular harp
trigonon	Ancient Greek	322.12	Angular harp
