= List of musical instruments by Hornbostel–Sachs number: 321.312 =

This is a list of instruments by Hornbostel-Sachs number, covering those instruments that are classified under 321.312 under that system. These instruments may be known as spike box lutes or spike guitars.

3: Instruments in which sound is produced by one or more vibrating strings (chordophones, string instruments).

32: Instruments in which the resonator and string bearer are physically united and can not be separated without destroying the instrument

321: Instruments in which the strings run in a plane parallel to the sound table (lutes)

321.3: Instruments in which the string bearer is a plain handle (handle lutes)

321.31: Instruments in which the handle passes diametrically through or over the resonator (spike lutes)

321.312: Instruments in which the resonator is in the form of a box (spike box lutes, spike guitars)

These instruments may be classified with a suffix, based on how the strings are caused to vibrate.

- 4: Hammers or beaters
- 5: Bare hands and fingers
- 6: Plectrum
- 7: Bowing
  - 71: Using a bow
  - 72: Using a wheel
  - 73: Using a ribbon
- 8: Keyboard
- 9: Using a mechanical drive

Instrument	Tradition	Hornbostel–Sachs classification	Description
banjo (with resonator)	African American	321.312-5	Four or five stringed instrument, plucked with a bare thumb and a forefinger covered by a metal thimble, traditionally with four or five strings,
gimbri guinbri, guimbri, gimbri, ginibri	Gnawa music	321.312	Rectangular box lute with leather tuning rings
gusle	Serbia, Montenegro and elsewhere in the former Yugoslavia	321.312	Stringed instrument, round, typically with one string bound at the top of the neck with a tuning peg Serbian gusle
morin khuur horse-head fiddle, shoor, ikil	Mongolia, Tuva	321.312	Two-stringed instrument, held between the legs, with a trapezoidal body and a horse's head typically carved on the upper edge of the pegbox
sanshin	Ryukyus of Japan	321.312-6	Three stringed fretless plucked instrument, covered with snakeskin
sanxian	China	321.312	Three-stringed fretless plucked instrument, with a box covered in snakeskin.
shanz shudraga	Mongolia	321.312	Three-stringed fretless plucked instrument, with a box covered in snakeskin.
shamisen	Japan	321.312-6	Three-stringed fretless plucked instrument, covered with dog or cat skin.
