= Tro Khmer =

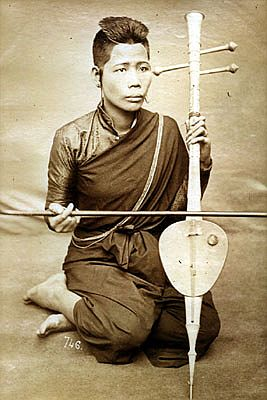
A musician at the Cambodian Royal Palace plays a three-stringed tro khmer fiddle (Tro Khse Bey), c. 1866 — 1870. The instrument's sound box is made from a coconut, chosen to resemble the silhouette of an elephant's head from the front, the trunk the instrument's leg.

The tro Khmer (Khmer: ទ្រខ្មែរ) is a traditional bowed string instrument from Cambodia. Its body is made from a special type of coconut covered on one end with snake skin, and it has three strings. Instruments are not standardized, and coconuts vary in size; however the instrument's sound bowl may have dimensions 16.5 cm by 14 cm. In the past the strings were made of silk. By the 1960s, metal strings were in use, and the sound of the instrument changed, becoming sharper.

The tro Khmer is closely related to a Thai instrument called saw sam sai.

The instrument may be related to the similarly shaped Indonesian version of the rebab, arriving there from Muslim culture, c. 15th century a.d. A difference between the two is the number of stings; where the Indonesian rebab has two strings, the tro Khmer has three.

== See also ==
- Indonesian rebab
- Tro (instrument)
- Traditional Cambodian musical instruments
- Music of Cambodia
- Huqin
