= Pluriarc =

West African string instrument

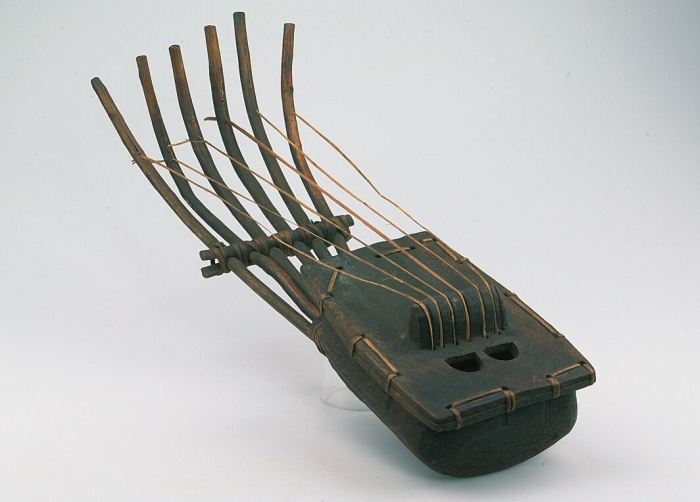
- Other names: bow lute, paata, mapu, luku, kissanga
- Classification: String; Chordophone; Lute
- Hornbostel–Sachs classification: 321.1 (Bow lute)

Related instruments
- Harp, Lute, Musical bow, Masenqo, Gusle, Igil, Krar

The pluriarc, also called paata, mapu, luku, kissanga, and bow lute is a stringed musical instrument of West Africa, classified as a type of lute.

It has a hollow body and several curved, pliable necks made of reeds. The strings stretch from the necks to the bridge, which stands approximately 1.5 inches (38 mm) above the body.

The body may be round, rectangular, or triangular, and is usually made of light wood. The top of the body can either be a separate board, bound or nailed to the lower part, or made from the same piece of wood as the rest. A hole may exist on the underside that can be opened or closed to change the timbre.

It is played by plucking the strings, which are usually open but sometimes contain a stop. The strings may be plucked with fingers or a plectrum. The flexible nature of the necks means the instrument cannot be tuned precisely.

Pluriarc designs have been characterized into three types by country of origin: those of southwestern Africa, central west Africa, and western Nigeria.
