= François Richard de Tussac =

French naturalist (1751–1837)

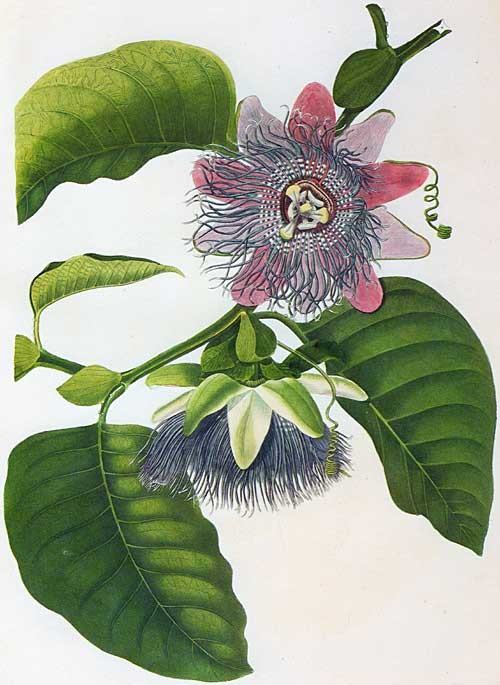
Passiflora quadrangularis by Pierre Antoine Poiteau from Flore des Antilles

François Richard de Tussac, also known as the Chevalier de Tussac (1751 Poitou – 1837), was a French botanist and naturalist from a wealthy family with colonial holdings. He is noted for his four-volume Flore des Antilles, ou Histoire générale botanique, rurale et économique des végétaux indigènes des Antilles, published in Paris by F. Schoell et Hautel, which is one of the earliest floras of the West Indies. He became senator for Guadeloupe in the Antilles and traveled widely through St. Domingue, Jamaica and Cuba. In his book Cri des Colons ("Cry of the Colonies") he opposed giving Blacks more legal rights.

De Tussac moved to Martinique in 1786 and spent some years collecting plants on the island, later becoming curator of a botanical garden in Haiti. He left Haiti in 1802, visited Jamaica and then returned to France, becoming in 1816 director of the Jardin Botanique d'Angers in Paris, a post that he filled until 1826. Flore des Antilles appeared from 1808 to 1827. Some 2,000 of Tussac's drawings made in Martinique were destroyed by fire in 1802 with the Haitian Revolution. De Tussac's herbarium was saved as were his manuscripts, although their whereabouts are unknown.

De Tussac is denoted by the author abbreviation Tussac when citing a botanical name. and is commemorated by the tree fern Alsophila tussacii (Desv.) D.S. Conant.
