= List of musical instruments by Hornbostel–Sachs number: 321.31 =

This is a list of instruments by Hornbostel–Sachs number, covering those instruments that are classified under 321.31 under that system. These instruments are also known as spike lutes. These instruments are made of a resonator and string bearer that are physically united, with strings in parallel to the sound table and a handle which is also the string bearer and which passes diametrically through the resonator. The shape of the resonator divides the instrument into one of three subcategories: spike bowl lutes, spike box lutes and spike tube lutes.

The spike in the name spike lute refers to the fact that the handle passes through the resonator, often forming a spike after it emerges from it. In instruments like the Chinese erhu, the spike is vestigial, but in many instruments, like the rebab, it acts as support during performances.

== West African griot and spike lutes ==
Spike lutes are common in West Africa, as are tanged lutes, instruments in which the handle does not extend all the way through the resonator. A hereditary class of West African musicians, griots, play only tanged lutes; but non-griot performers in West Africa play a mixture of both spike lutes and tanged lutes.

The resonator of these West African lutes may be made of wood, metal (such as a discarded can), hide, or a half-calabash gourd. Non-griot lutes are not restricted by heredity, and are used for many social purposes, most commonly hunting. It is likely that one or more of these instruments is the ancestor of the African American banjo.

== Classification ==
3: Instruments in which sound is produced by one or more vibrating strings (chordophones, string instruments).

32: Instruments in which the resonator and string bearer are physically united and can not be separated without destroying the instrument

321: Instruments in which the strings run in a plane parallel to the sound table (lutes)

321.3: Instruments in which the string bearer is a plain handle (handle lutes)

321.31: Instruments in which the handle passes diametrically through or over the resonator (spike lutes)

321.311: Instrument with a resonator made from a bowl, either natural or carved (spike bowl lutes)
321.312: Instruments in which the resonator is in the form of a box (spike box lutes, spike guitars)
321.313: Instrument in which the handle passes diametrically through the walls of a tube (where the depth of the body exceeds the radius of the membrane) (spike tube lutes)

These instruments may be classified with a suffix, based on how the strings are caused to vibrate.

- 4: Hammers or beaters
- 5: Bare hands and fingers
- 6: Plectrum
- 7: Bowing
  - 71: Using a bow
  - 72: Using a wheel
  - 73: Using a ribbon
- 8: Keyboard
- 9: Using a mechanical drive
