= Banjo =

Stringed musical instrument

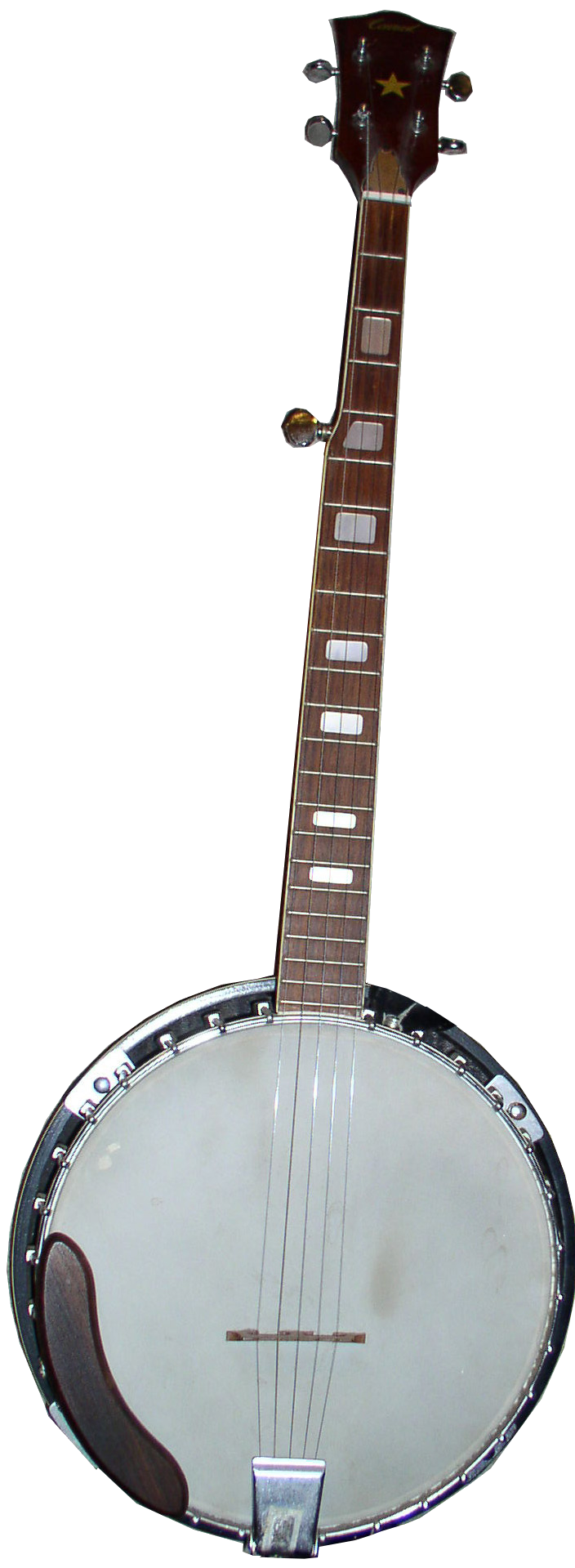
- A five-string banjo

String instrument
- Hornbostel–Sachs classification: 321.312 (resonator) or 321.314 (open-backed) (Composite chordophone with a neck that passes diametrically through the resonator, sounded by plectrum, finger picks, or the bare fingers)
- Developed: 18th century, United States

Sound sample
- "Don't Let Your Deal Go Down" Flatt and Scruggs song that opens with Bluegrass banjo, using the modern banjo-picking style with fingerpicks known as Scruggs style. "The Buffalo Rag" Tom Turpin's 1904 composition "The Buffalo Rag", in a 1906 performance by Vess Ossman. Although this is a ragtime piece, Ossman played with classic banjo style. He fingerpicked gut strings using a technique similar to classical guitarists.

The banjo is a stringed musical instrument with a thin membrane stretched over a frame or cavity to form a resonator. The membrane is typically circular, and in modern forms is usually made of mylar (BOPET), whereas earlier examples of banjos had membranes made of goat skin.

Early forms of the instrument were fashioned by African Americans and had African antecedents, and the instrument was strongly associated with black people. In the 19th century, interest in the instrument was spread across the United States and United Kingdom by traveling shows of the highly popular traveling blackface minstrel shows, followed by mass production and mail-order sales, including instructional books. The inexpensive or home-made banjo remained part of rural folk culture, but five-string and four-string banjos also became popular for home parlor music entertainment, college music clubs, and early 20th century jazz bands. By the early 20th century, the banjo was most frequently associated with folk, blues, cowboy music, and country music.

By mid-century it had come to be strongly associated with bluegrass. Eventually it began to be employed occasionally and sporadically in various kinds or other kinds of popular music. Some famous American bluegrass players of the banjo are Ralph Stanley and Earl Scruggs.

Historically, the banjo occupied a central place in Black American traditional music and rural folk culture before entering the mainstream via the minstrel shows of the 19th century. Along with the fiddle, the banjo is a mainstay of American styles of music, such as bluegrass and old-time music. It is also very frequently used in Dixieland jazz, as well as in Caribbean genres like biguine, calypso, mento and twoubadou.

== Etymology ==
The term banjo has several possible etymological origins. One theory links it to the Mandinka language which gives the name of Banjul, capital of The Gambia. Another claim is a connection to the West African akonting: it is made with a long bamboo neck called a bangoe. The material for the neck, called ban julo in the Mandinka language, again gives banjul. In this interpretation, banjul became a sort of eponym for the akonting as it crossed the Atlantic. The instrument's name might also derive from the Kimbundu word mbanza, which is a loan word to the Portuguese language resulting in the term banza, which was used by early French travelers in the Americas. Its earliest recorded use was in 1678 by the Sovereign Council of Martinique which reinstated a 1654 decree that placed prohibitions and restrictions on "dances and assemblies of negroes" deemed to be kalenda, which was defined as the gathering of enslaved Africans who danced to the sound of a drum and an instrument called the banza.

The OED claims that the term banjo comes from a dialectal pronunciation of Portuguese bandore or from an early anglicisation of Spanish bandurria. Contrary evidence shows that the terms bandore and bandurria were used when Europeans encountered the instrument or its kin varieties in use by people of African descent, who used names for the instrument such as banza, as it was called in places such as Haiti, varieties that were built around a gourd body with a wooden plank for the neck. François Richard de Tussac, a former planter from Saint-Domingue, details its construction in the book Le Cri des Colons, published in 1810, stating:

As for the guitars, which the negroes call banzas, this is what they consist of: they cut lengthwise, through the middle, a fresh calabash [the fruit of a tree called the callebassier]. This fruit is sometimes eight inches or more in diameter. The stretch across it the skin of a goat, which they attach on the edges with little nails; they put two or three little holes on this surface, and then a kind of plank or piece of wood that is rudely flattened makes the neck of the instrument; they stretch three strings made of pitre [a kind of string taken from the agave plant, commonly known as pitre] across it; and so the instrument is built. On this instrument they play airs composed of three or four notes, which they repeat constantly.

== History ==
=== Early origins ===
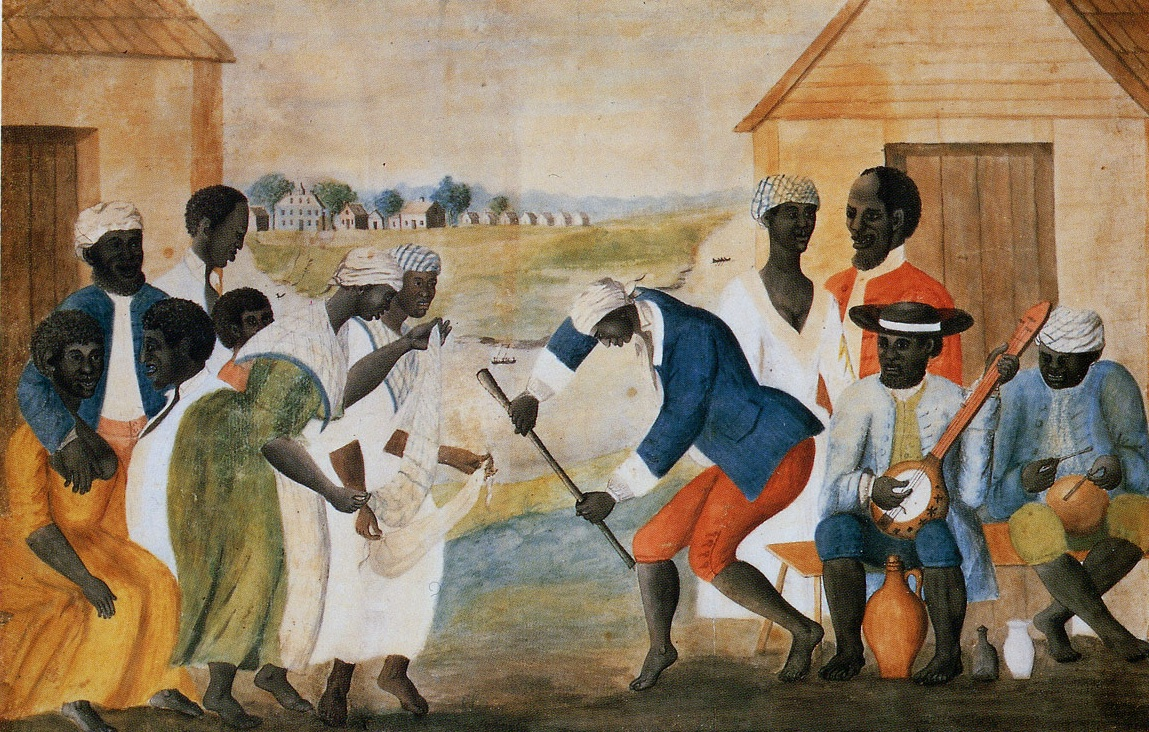
The Old Plantation, c. 1785–1795, the earliest known American painting to picture a banjo-like instrument, which shows a four-string instrument with its 4th (thumb) string shorter than the others; thought to depict a plantation in Beaufort County, South Carolina

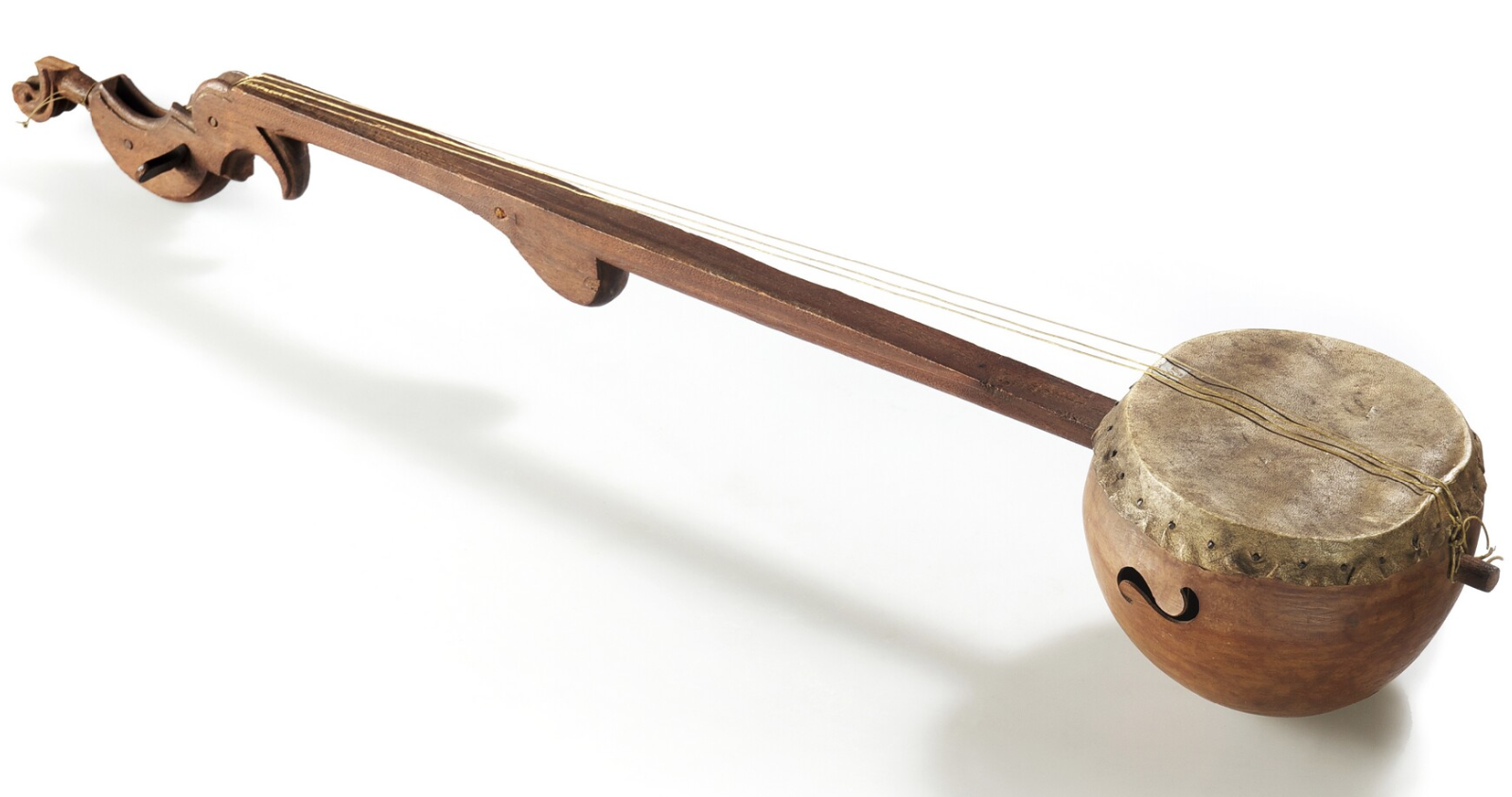
The oldest extant banjo, c. 1770–1777, from the Surinamese Creole culture.

The modern banjo derives from instruments that have been recorded to be in use in North America and the Caribbean since the 17th century by enslaved people taken from West and Central Africa, such as the kora. Their African-style instruments were crafted from split gourds with animal skins stretched across them. Strings, from gut or vegetable fibers, were attached to a wooden neck. Written references to the banjo in North America and the Caribbean appear in the 17th and 18th centuries.

The earliest written indication of an instrument akin to the banjo is in the 17th century: Richard Jobson (1621) in describing The Gambia, wrote about an instrument which some consider to be similar to the banjo.

They have little varietie of instruments, that which is most common in use, is made of a great gourd, and a necke thereunto fastned, resembling, in some sort, our Bandora; but they have no manner of fret, and the strings they are either such as the place yeeldes or their invention can attaine to make, being very unapt to yeeld a sweete and musicall sound, notwithstanding with pinnes they winde and bring to agree in tunable notes, having not above sixe strings upon their greatest instrument.

Michel Étienne Descourtilz, a naturalist who visited Haiti in the early 1800s, described it as banzas, a Negro instrument, that the natives prepare by sawing one of the calabashes or a large gourd lengthwise, to which they attach a neck and sonorous strings made from the filament" of aloe plants. It was played during any occasion, from boredom to joyous parties and calendas to funeral ceremonies. It was the custom to also combine this sound with the more noisy bamboula, a type of drum made from a stick of bamboo covered on both sides with a skin that was played with fingers and knuckles while sitting astride.

Various instruments in Africa, chief among them the kora, feature a skin drumhead and gourd (or similar shell) body. These instruments differ from early African-American banjos in that the necks do not possess a Western-style fingerboard and tuning pegs; instead they have stick necks, with strings attached to the neck with loops for tuning.

Another likely relative of the banjo is the aforementioned akonting, a spike folk lute which is constructed using a gourd body, a long wooden neck, and three strings played by the Jola tribe of Senegambia, and the ubaw-akwala of the Igbo. Similar instruments include the xalam of Senegal and the ngoni of the Wassoulou region that includes parts of Mali, Guinea, and Ivory Coast, as well as a larger variation of the ngoni, known as the gimbri, developed in Morocco by sub-Saharan Africans (Gnawa or Haratin).

Banjo-like instruments seem to have been independently invented in several different places, in addition to the many African instruments mentioned above, since instruments similar to the banjo are known from a diverse array of distant countries. For example, the Chinese sanxian, the Japanese shamisen, the Persian tar, and the Moroccan sintir.

Banjos with fingerboards and tuning pegs are known from the Caribbean as early as the 17th century. Some 18th- and early 19th-century writers transcribed the name of these instruments variously as bangie, banza, bonjaw, banjer and banjar. A British tourist's 1812 description of a gambling hall in Wheeling, Virginia mentions bangies: "Would that Hogarth had lived to see that room! One corner was occupied by a portion of the assembly, engaged in the fascinating games of all-fours, three-up and cribbage; in another stood a table of refreshments, whiskey and biscuit, surrounded by a crowd of drinkers and smokers; a group of noisy politicians held possession in the third; and in the fourth was stationed the music which consisted of two bangies played by negroes nearly in a state of nudity, and a lute through which a Chickasaw breathed delightful harmony."

The instrument became increasingly available commercially from around the second quarter of the 19th century due to minstrel show performances.

=== Minstrel era, 1830s–1870s ===
Medley of minstrel songs played on the banjo by Ruby Brooks. The playing style is clawhammer or frailing.

In the antebellum South, many enslaved Africans played the banjo, spreading it to the rest of the population. In his memoir With Sabre and Scalpel: The Autobiography of a Soldier and Surgeon, the Confederate veteran and surgeon John Allan Wyeth recalls learning to play the banjo as a child from an enslaved person on his family plantation. Another man who learned to play from African-Americans, probably in the 1820s, was Joel Walker Sweeney, a minstrel performer from Appomattox Court House, Virginia. Sweeney has been credited with adding a string to the four-string African-American banjo, and popularizing the five-string banjo. Although Robert McAlpin Williamson is the first documented white banjoist, in the 1830s Sweeney became the first white performer to play the banjo on stage. Sweeney's musical performances occurred at the beginning of the minstrel era, as banjos shifted away from being exclusively homemade folk instruments to instruments of a more modern style. Sweeney participated in this transition by encouraging drum maker William Boucher of Baltimore to make banjos commercially for him to sell.

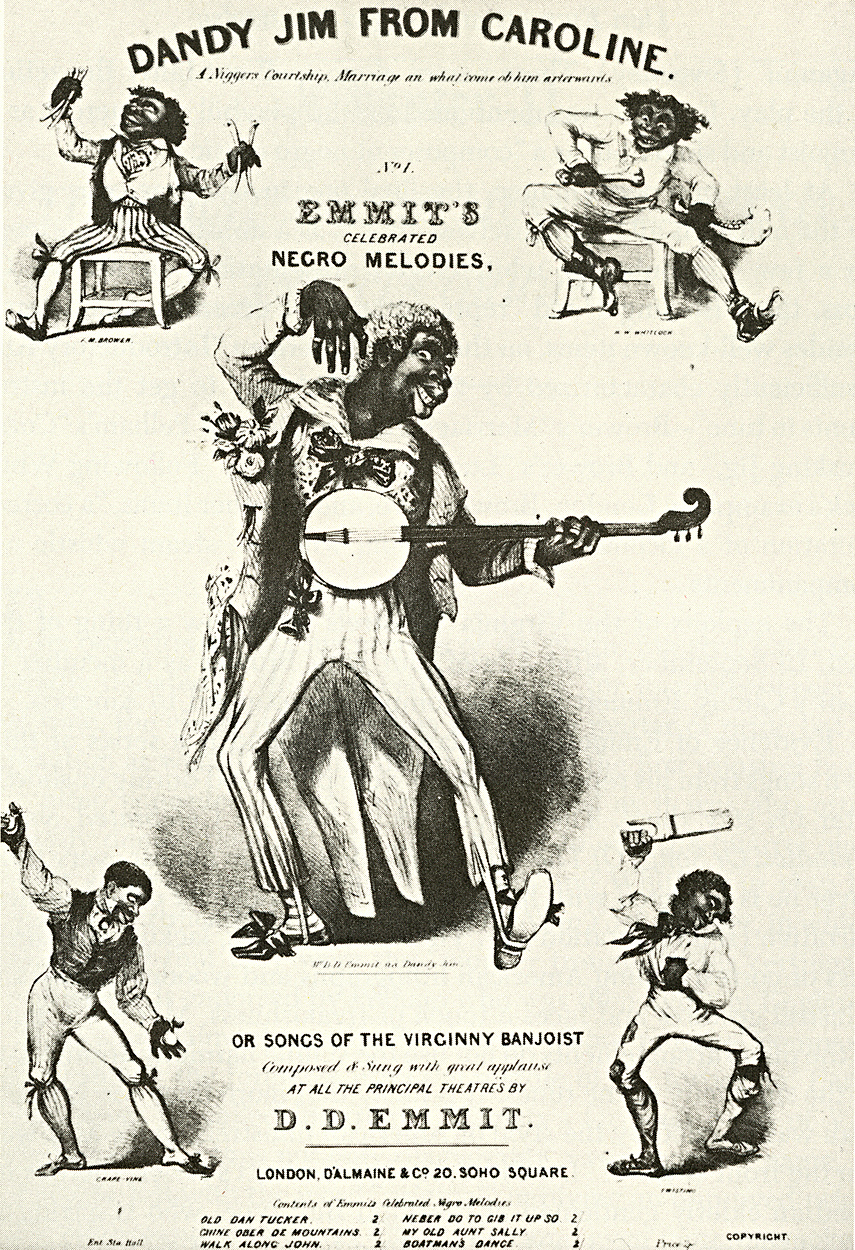
Sheet music cover for "Dandy Jim from Caroline", featuring Dan Emmett (center) and the other Virginia Minstrels, c. 1844

In 1949, Arthur Woodward credited Sweeney with replacing the gourd with a wooden sound box covered in skin, and adding a short fifth string around 1831. However, modern scholar Gene Bluestein pointed out in 1964 that Sweeney may not have originated either the 5th string or sound box. This new banjo was at first tuned d'Gdf♯a, though by the 1890s, this had been transposed up to g'cgbd'. Banjos were introduced in Britain by Sweeney's group, the American Virginia Minstrels, in the 1840s, and became very popular in music halls.

The instrument grew in popularity during the 1840s after Sweeney began his traveling minstrel show. By the end of the 1840s the instrument had expanded from Caribbean possession to take root in places across America and across the Atlantic in England. It was estimated in 1866 that there were probably 10,000 banjos in New York City, up from only a handful in 1844. People were exposed to banjos not only at minstrel shows, but also medicine shows, Wild-West shows, variety shows, and traveling vaudeville shows. The banjo's popularity also was given a boost by the Civil War, as servicemen on both sides in the Army or Navy were exposed to the banjo played in minstrel shows and by other servicemen. A popular movement of aspiring banjoists began as early as 1861. The enthusiasm for the instrument was labeled a "banjo craze" or "banjo mania."

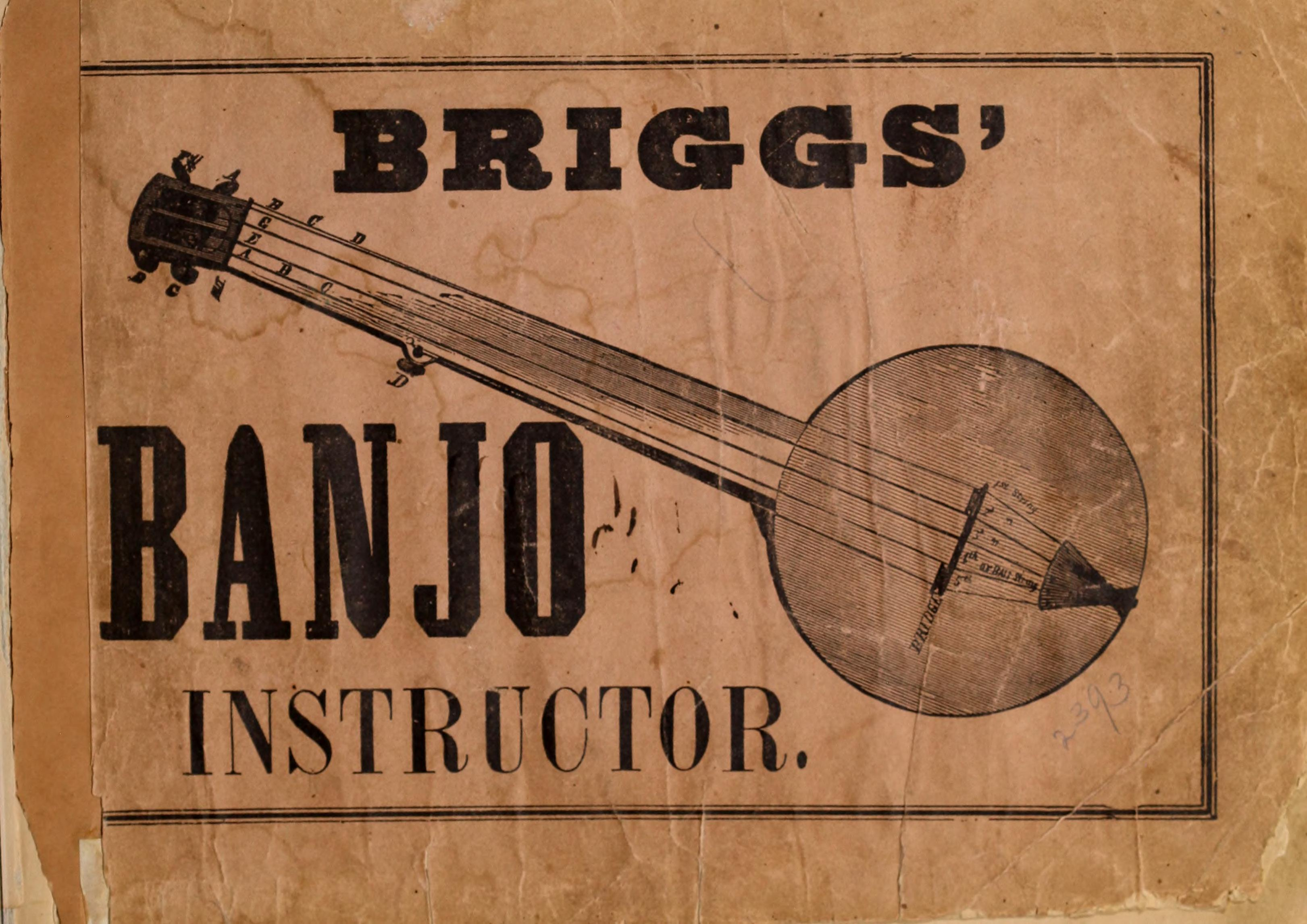
The Briggs' Banjo Instructor was the first method for the banjo. It taught the stroke style and had notated music. Publication date - 1855

By the 1850s, aspiring banjo players had options to help them learn their instrument. There were more teachers teaching banjo basics in the 1850s than there had been in the 1840s. There were also instruction manuals and, for those who could read it, printed music in the manuals. The first book of notated music was The Complete Preceptor by Elias Howe, published under the pseudonym Gumbo Chaff, consisting mainly of Christy's Minstrels tunes. The first banjo method was the Briggs' Banjo instructor (1855) by Tom Briggs. Other methods included Howe's New American Banjo School (1857), and Phil Rice's Method for the Banjo, With or Without a Master (1858). These books taught the "stroke style" or "banjo style", similar to modern "frailing" or "clawhammer" styles.

By 1868, music for the banjo was available printed in a magazine, when J. K. Buckley wrote and arranged popular music for Buckley's Monthly Banjoist. Frank B. Converse also published his entire collection of compositions in The Complete Banjoist in 1868, which included "polkas, waltzes, marches, and clog hornpipes."

In the 1840s, opportunities for work were found not only in minstrel companies and circuses, but also in floating theaters and variety theaters, which served as precursors to the variety show and vaudeville.

=== Classic era, 1880s–1910s ===
Carnival of Venice, variations on the folk song composed by Julius Benedict, arranged for banjo and played on banjo by Alfred A. Farland. This song is an example of Farland's use of bare fingers to produce tremolo to get long notes from the instrument (much as the cornet or violin can naturally play.)

The term classic banjo is used today to talk about a bare-finger "guitar style" that was widely in use among banjo players of the late 19th to early 20th century. It is still used by banjoists today. The term also differentiates that style of playing from the fingerpicking bluegrass banjo styles, such as the Scruggs style and Keith style.

The Briggs Banjo Method, considered to be the first banjo method and which taught the stroke style of playing, also mentioned the existence of another way of playing, the guitar style. Alternatively known as "finger style", the new way of playing the banjo displaced the stroke method, until by 1870 it was the dominant style. Although mentioned by Briggs, it wasn't taught. The first banjo method to teach the technique was Frank B. Converse's New and Complete Method for the Banjo with or without a Master, published in 1865.

To play in guitar style, players use the thumb and two or three fingers on their right hand to pick the notes. Samuel Swaim Stewart summarized the style in 1888, saying,

In the guitar style of Banjo-playing...the little finger of the right hand is rested upon the head near the bridge...[and] serves as a rest to the hand and a resistance to the movement of picking the strings...In the beginning it is best to acquire a knowledge of picking the strings with the use of the first and second fingers and thumb only, allowing the third finger to remain idle until the other fingers have become thoroughly accustomed to their work...the three fingers are almost invariably used in playing chords and accompaniments to songs."

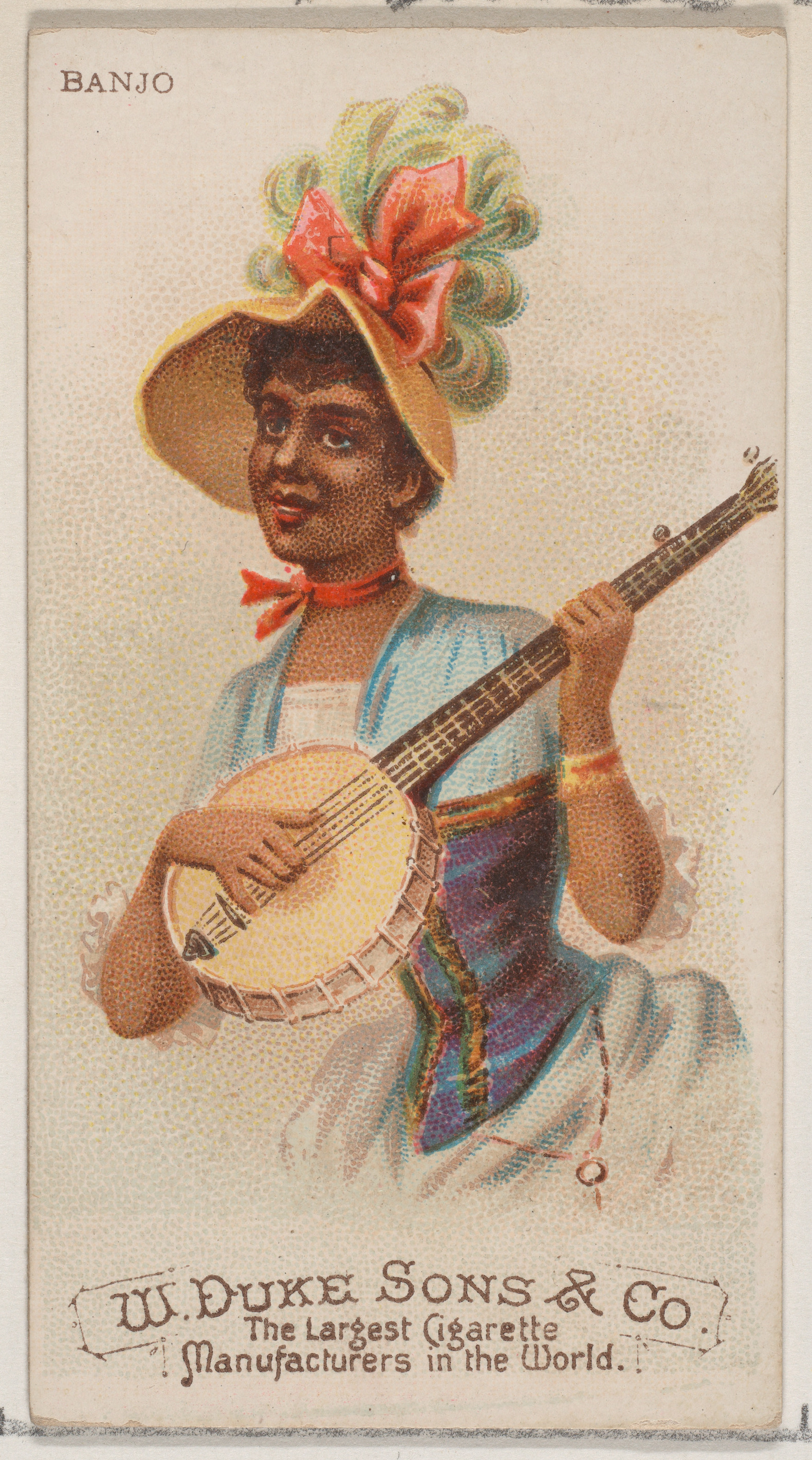
Banjo, from the Musical Instruments series (N82) for Duke brand cigarettes, 1888

The banjo, although popular, carried low-class associations from its role in blackface minstrel shows, medicine shows, tent shows, and variety shows or vaudeville. There was a push in the 19th century to bring the instrument into "respectability." Musicians such as William A. Huntley made an effort to "elevate" the instrument or make it more "artistic," by "bringing it to a more sophisticated level of technique and repertoire based on European standards." Huntley may have been the first white performer to successfully make the transition from performing in blackface to being himself on stage, noted by the Boston Herald in November 1884. He was supported by another former blackface performer, Samuel Swaim Stewart, in his corporate magazine that popularized highly talented professionals.

As the "raucous" imitations of plantation life decreased in minstrelsy, the banjo became more acceptable as an instrument of fashionable society, even to be accepted into women's parlors. Part of that change was a switch from the stroke style to the guitar playing style. An 1888 newspaper said, "All the maidens and a good many of the women also strum the instrument, banjo classes abound on every side and banjo recitals are among the newest diversions of fashion...Youths and elderly men too have caught the fever...the star strummers among men are in demand at the smartest parties and have the choosing of the society of the most charming girls."

Some of those entertainers, such as Alfred A. Farland, specialized in classical music. However, musicians who wanted to entertain their audiences, and make a living, mixed it in with the popular music that audiences wanted. Farland's pupil Frederick J. Bacon was one of these. A former medicine show entertainer, Bacon performed classical music along with popular songs such as Massa's in de cold, cold ground, a Medley of Scotch Airs, a Medley of Southern Airs, and Thomas Glynn's West Lawn Polka.

Banjo innovation which began in the minstrel age continued, with increased use of metal parts, exotic wood, raised metal frets and a tone-ring that improved the sound. Instruments were designed in a variety of sizes and pitch ranges, to play different parts in banjo orchestras. Examples on display in the museum include banjorines and piccolo banjos.

New styles of playing, instruments in a variety of pitch ranges to take the place of different sections in an orchestra – all helped to separate the instrument from the minstrel image of the previous 50–60 years.

=== Ragtime era (1895–1919) and Jazz Age era (1910s–1930s) ===
In the early 1900s, new banjos began to spread, four-string models, played with a plectrum rather than with the minstrel-banjo clawhammer stroke or the classic-banjo fingerpicking style. The new banjos were a result of changing musical tastes. New music spurred the creation of "evolutionary variations" of the banjo, from the five-string model current since the 1830s to newer four-string plectrum and tenor banjos.

The instruments became ornately decorated in the 1920s to be visually dynamic to a theater audience. The instruments were increasingly modified or made in a new style – necks that were shortened to handle the four steel (not fiber as before) strings, strings that were sounded with a pick instead of fingers, four strings instead of five and tuned differently. The changes reflected the nature of post-World-War-I music. The country was turning away from European classics, preferring the "upbeat and carefree feel" of jazz, and American soldiers returning from the war helped to drive this change.

The change in tastes toward dance music and the need for louder instruments began a few years before the war, however, with ragtime. That music encouraged musicians to alter their 5-string banjos to four, add the louder steel strings and use a pick or plectrum, all in an effort to be heard over the brass and reed instruments that were current in dance-halls. The four string plectrum and tenor banjos did not eliminate the five-string variety. They were products of their times and musical purposes—ragtime and jazz dance music and theater music.

The Great Depression is a visible line to mark the end of the Jazz Age. The economic downturn cut into the sales of both four- and five-stringed banjos, and by World War 2, banjos were in sharp decline, the market for them dead.

=== Modern era ===
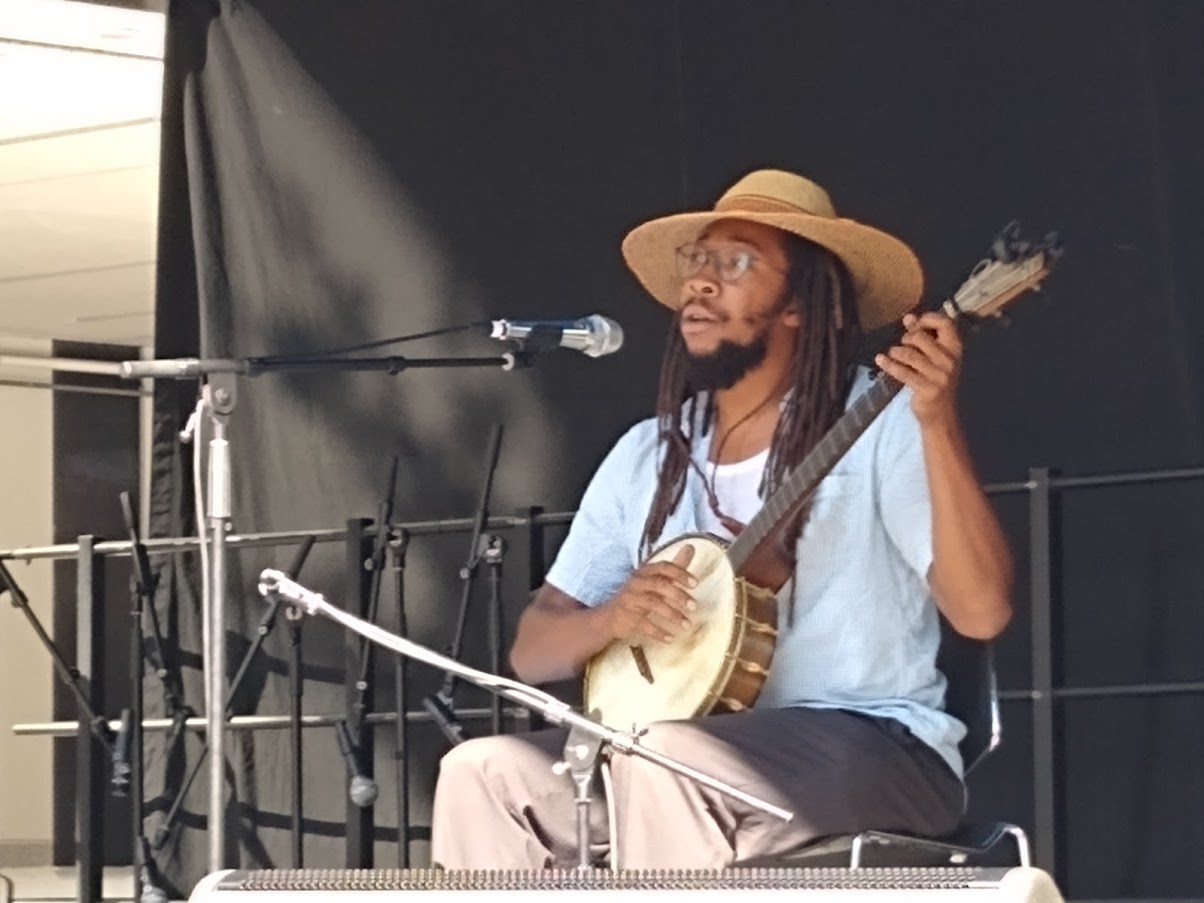
Hubby Jenkins performing on solo banjo at the IBMA Bluegrass Live! festival in Raleigh, North Carolina on October 2, 2021

In the years after World War II, the banjo experienced a resurgence, played by music stars such as Earl Scruggs (bluegrass), Bela Fleck (jazz, rock, world music), Gerry O'Connor (Celtic and Irish music), Perry Bechtel (jazz, big band), Pete Seeger (folk), and Otis Taylor (African-American roots, blues, jazz).

Pete Seeger "was a major force behind a new national interest in folk music." Learning to play a fingerstyle in the Appalachians from musicians who never stopped playing the banjo, he wrote the book, How to Play the Five-String Banjo, which was the only banjo method on the market for years. He was followed by a movement of folk musicians, such as Dave Guard of The Kingston Trio and Erik Darling of the Weavers and Tarriers.

Earl Scruggs was seen both as a legend and a "contemporary musical innovator" who gave his name to his style of playing, the Scruggs Style. Scruggs played the banjo "with heretofore unheard of speed and dexterity," using a picking technique for the 5-string banjo that he perfected from 2-finger and 3-finger picking techniques in rural North Carolina. His playing reached Americans through the Grand Ole Opry and into the living rooms of Americans who didn't listen to country or bluegrass music, through the theme music of The Beverly Hillbillies TV sitcom, as well as the background music during chase sequences in another sitcom, The Dukes of Hazzard.

For the last one hundred years, the tenor banjo has become an part of the world of Irish traditional music.

The banjo has also been used more recently in the hardcore punk scene, most notably by Show Me the Body on their debut album, Body War.

== Technique ==
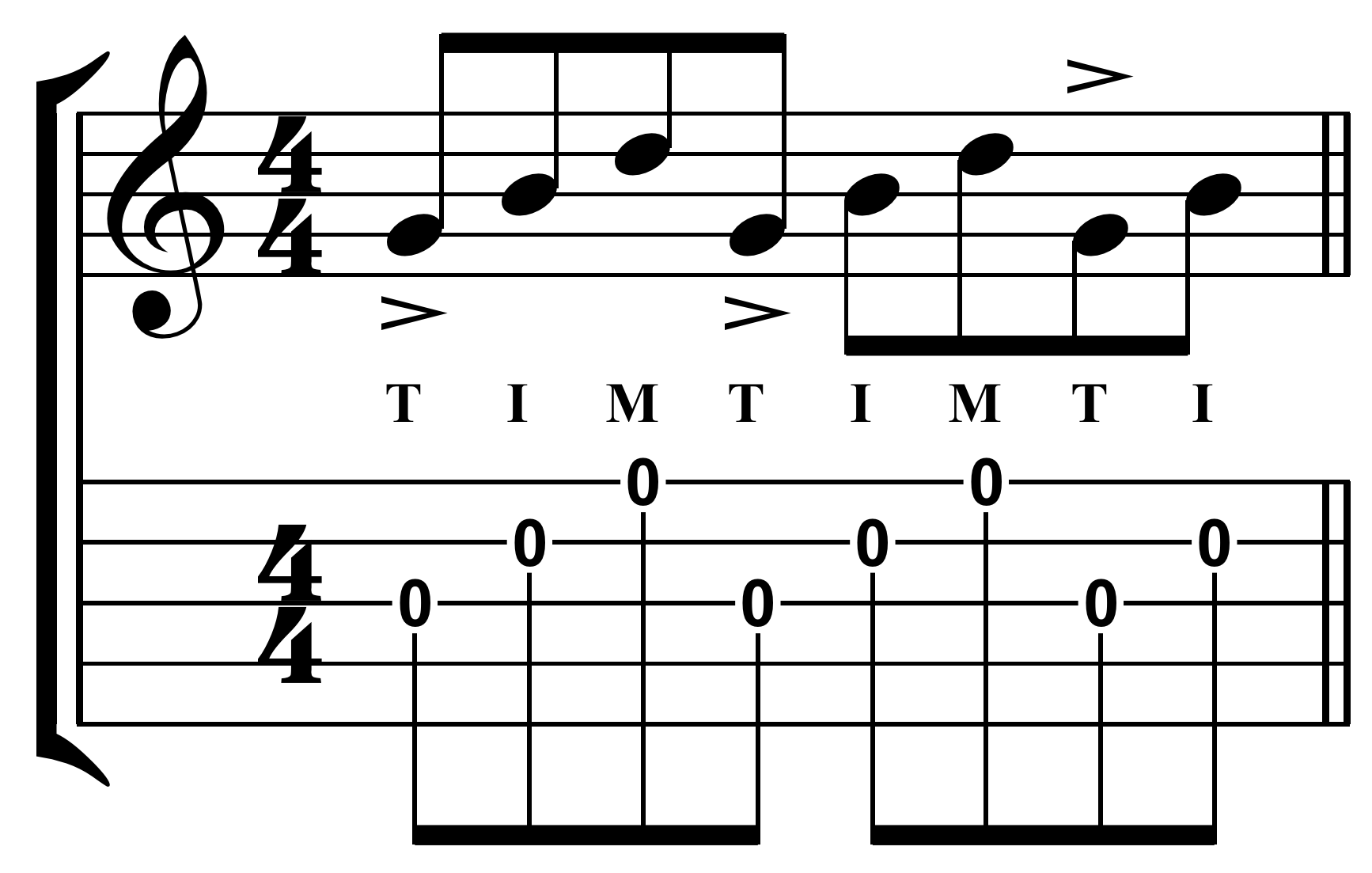
Forward roll.

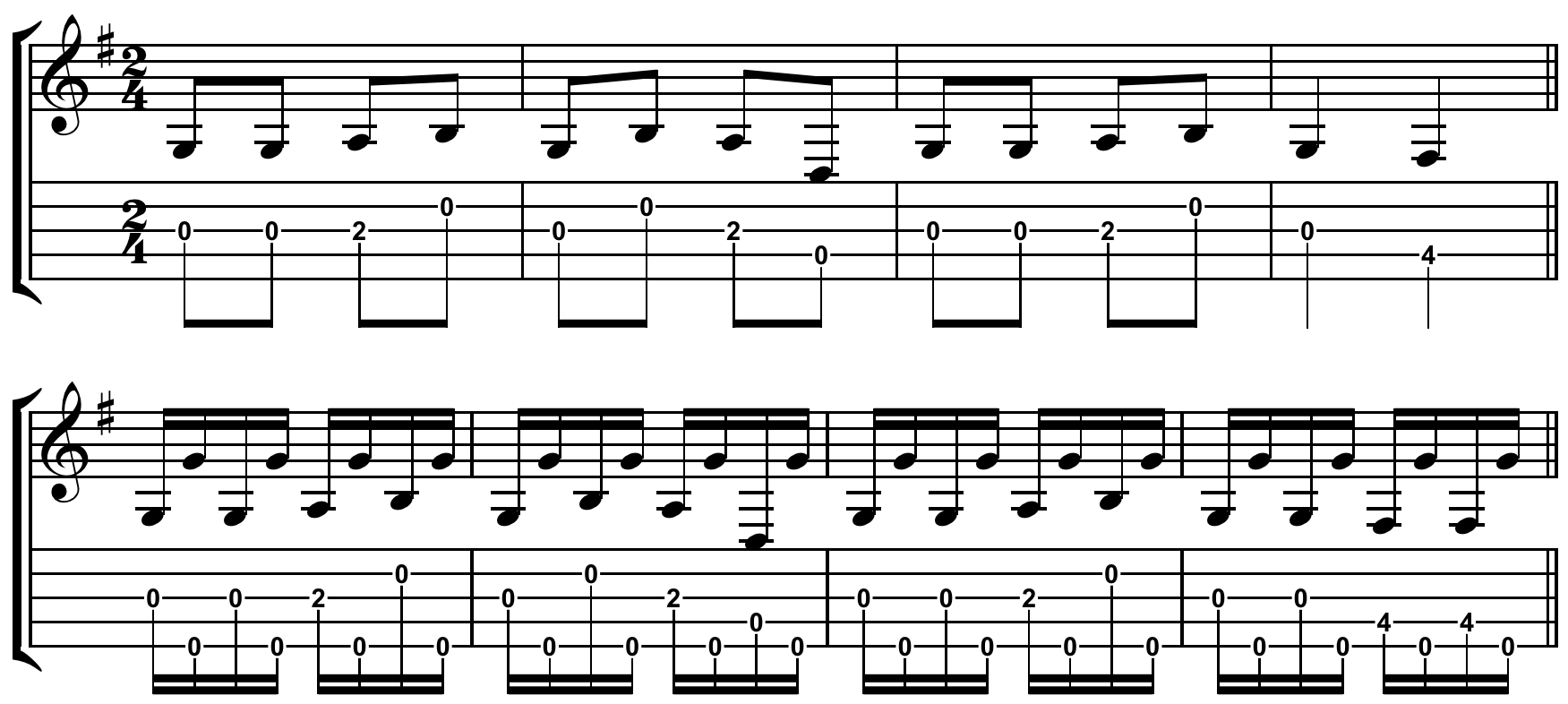
Melody to Yankee Doodle, on the banjo, without and with drone notes and with drone.

Two techniques closely associated with the five-string banjo are rolls and drones. Rolls are right hand accompanimental fingering patterns that consist of eight (eighth) notes that subdivide each measure. Drone notes are quick little notes (typically eighth notes), usually played on the 5th (short) string to fill in around the melody notes (typically eighth notes). Both rolls and drones are idiomatic to the banjo in all styles, and their sound is characteristic of bluegrass.

Historically, the banjo was played in the claw-hammer style by the Africans who brought their version of the banjo with them. Several other styles of play were developed from this. Clawhammer consists of downward striking of one or more of the four main strings with the index, middle or both fingers while the drone or fifth string is played with a 'lifting' (as opposed to downward pluck) motion of the thumb. The notes typically sounded by the thumb in this fashion are, usually, on the off beat. Melodies can be quite intricate adding techniques such as double thumbing and drop thumb. In old time Appalachian Mountain music, a style called two-finger up-pick is also used, and a three-finger version that Earl Scruggs developed into the "Scruggs" style picking was nationally aired in 1945 on the Grand Ole Opry. In this style the instrument is played by plucking individual notes. Modern fingerstyle is usually played using fingerpicks, though early players and some modern players play either with nails or with a technique known as on the flesh. In this style the strings are played directly with the fingers, rather than any pick or intermediary.

While five-string banjos are traditionally played with either fingerpicks or the fingers themselves, tenor banjos and plectrum banjos are played with a pick, either to strum full chords, or most commonly in Irish traditional music, play single-note melodies.

== Modern forms ==
The modern banjo comes in a variety of forms, including four- and five-string versions. A six-string version, tuned and played similarly to a guitar, has gained popularity. In almost all of its forms, banjo playing is characterized by a fast arpeggiated plucking, though many different playing styles exist.

The body, or "pot", of a modern banjo typically consists of a circular rim (generally made of wood, though metal was also common on older banjos) and a tensioned head, similar to a drum head. Traditionally, the head was made from animal skin, but today is often made of various synthetic materials. Most modern banjos also have a metal "tone ring" assembly that helps further clarify and project the sound, but many older banjos do not include a tone ring.

The banjo is usually tuned with friction tuning pegs or planetary gear tuners, rather than the worm gear machine head used on guitars. Frets have become standard since the late 19th century, though fretless banjos are still manufactured and played by those wishing to execute glissando, play quarter tones, or otherwise achieve the sound and feeling of early playing styles.

Modern banjos are typically strung with metal strings. Usually, the fourth string is wound with either steel or bronze-phosphor alloy. Some players may string their banjos with nylon or gut strings to achieve a more mellow, old-time tone.

Some banjos have a separate resonator plate on the back of the pot to project the sound forward and give the instrument more volume. This type of banjo is usually used in bluegrass music, though resonator banjos are played by players of all styles, and are also used in old-time, sometimes as a substitute for electric amplification when playing in large venues.

Open-back banjos generally have a mellower tone and weigh less than resonator banjos. They usually have a different setup than a resonator banjo, often with a higher distance between strings and fret, also known as string action.

=== Five-string banjo ===
The modern five-string banjo is a variation on Sweeney's original design. The fifth string is usually the same gauge as the first, but starts from the fifth fret, three-quarters the length of the other strings. This lets the string be tuned to a higher open pitch than possible for the full-length strings. Because of the short fifth string, the five-string banjo uses a reentrant tuning – the string pitches do not proceed lowest to highest across the fingerboard. Instead, the fourth string is lowest, then third, second, first, and the fifth string is highest.

The short fifth string presents special problems for a capo. For small changes (going up or down one or two semitones, for example), simply retuning the fifth string is possible. Otherwise, various devices called "fifth-string capos" effectively shorten the vibrating part of the string. Many banjo players use model-railroad spikes or titanium spikes (usually installed at the seventh fret and sometimes at others), under which they hook the string to press it down on the fret.

Five-string banjo players use many tunings. (Tunings are given in left-to-right order, as viewed from the front of the instrument with the neck pointing up for a right-handed instrument. Left handed instruments reverse the order of the strings.) Probably the most common, particularly in bluegrass, is the Open-G tuning G_{4} D_{3} G_{3} B_{3} D_{4}. In earlier times, the tuning G_{4} C_{3} G_{3} B_{3} D_{4} was commonly used instead, and this is still the preferred tuning for some types of folk music and for classic banjo. Other tunings found in old-time music include double C (G_{4} C_{3} G_{3} C_{4} D_{4}), "sawmill", also called "mountain modal" (G_{4} D_{3} G_{3} C_{4} D_{4}), and open D (F#_{4} D_{3} F#_{3} A_{3} D_{4}). These tunings are often taken up a tone, either by tuning up or using a capo. For example, "double-D" tuning (A_{4} D_{3} A_{3} D_{4} E_{4}) – commonly reached by tuning up from double C – is often played to accompany fiddle tunes in the key of D, and Open-A (A_{4} E_{3} A_{3} C#_{4} E_{4}) is usually used for playing tunes in the key of A. Dozens of other banjo tunings are used, mostly in old-time music. These tunings are used to make playing specific tunes easier, usually fiddle tunes or groups of fiddle tunes.

The size of the five-string banjo is largely standardized, with a scale length of 26.25 in (667 mm), but smaller and larger sizes exist, including the long-neck or "Seeger neck" variation designed by Pete Seeger. Petite variations on the five-string banjo have been available since the 1890s. S.S. Stewart introduced the banjeaurine, tuned one fourth above a standard five-string. Piccolo banjos are smaller, and tuned one octave above a standard banjo. Between these sizes and standard lies the A-scale banjo, which is two frets shorter and usually tuned one full step above standard tunings. Many makers have produced banjos of other scale lengths, and with various innovations.

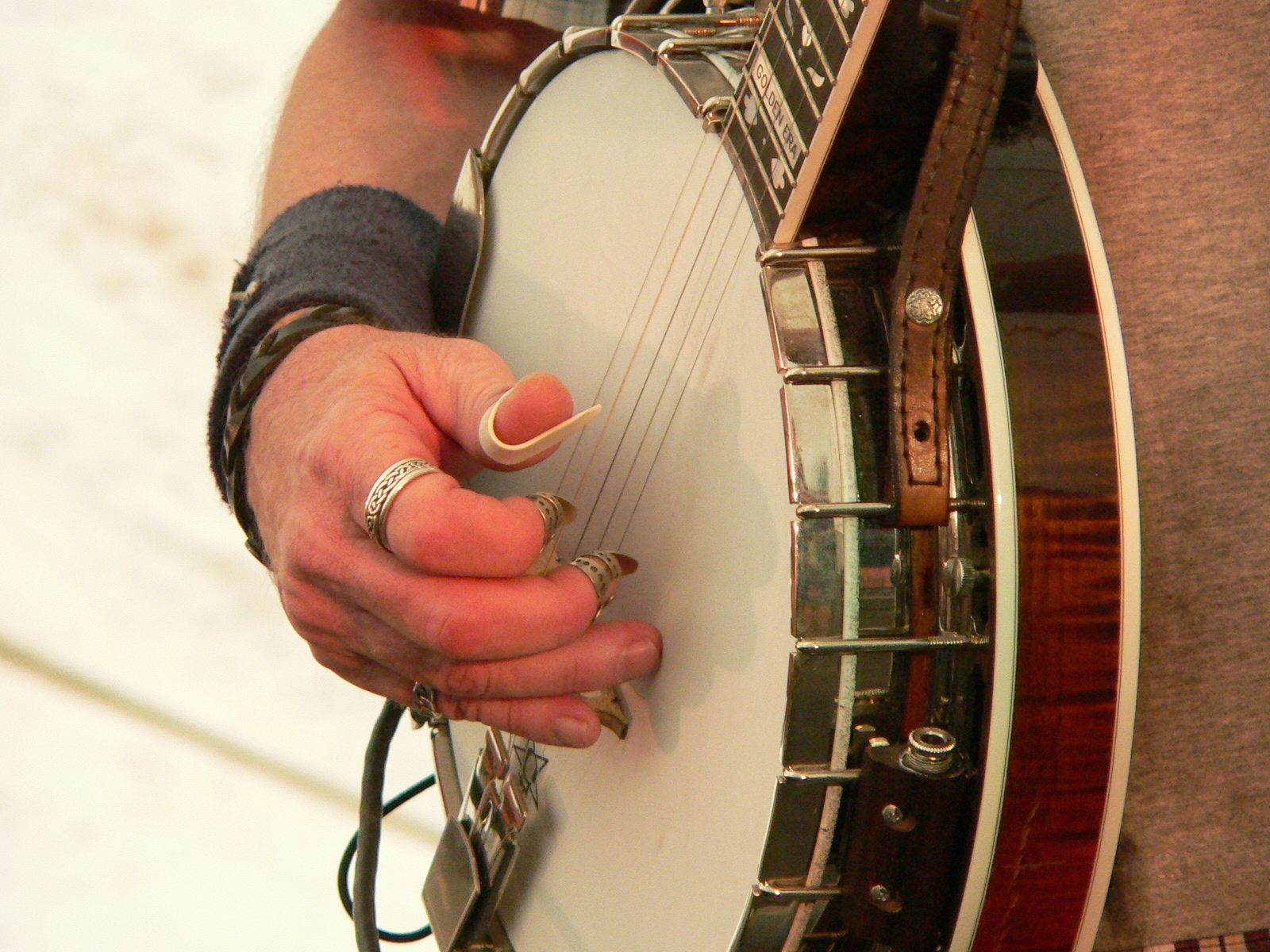
A five-string banjo

American old-time music typically uses the five-string, open-back banjo. It is played in a number of different styles, the most common being clawhammer or frailing, characterized by the use of a downward rather than upward stroke when striking the strings with a fingernail. Frailing techniques use the thumb to catch the fifth string for a drone after most strums or after each stroke ("double thumbing"), or to pick out additional melody notes in what is known as drop-thumb. Pete Seeger popularized a folk style by combining clawhammer with up picking, usually without the use of fingerpicks. Another common style of old-time banjo playing is fingerpicking banjo or classic banjo. This style is based upon parlor-style guitar.

Bluegrass music, which uses the five-string resonator banjo almost exclusively, is played in several common styles. These include Scruggs style, named after Earl Scruggs; melodic, or Keith style, named for Bill Keith; and three-finger style with single-string work, also called Reno style after Don Reno. In these styles, the emphasis is on arpeggiated figures played in a continuous eighth-note rhythm, known as rolls. All of these styles are typically played with fingerpicks.

The first five-string, electric, solid-body banjo was developed by Charles Wilburn (Buck) Trent, Harold "Shot" Jackson, and David Jackson in 1960.

The five-string banjo has been used in classical music since before the turn of the 20th century. Contemporary and modern works have been written or arranged for the instrument by Don Vappie, Jerry Garcia, Buck Trent, Béla Fleck, Tony Trischka, Ralph Stanley, George Gibson, Steve Martin, Clifton Hicks, George Crumb, Tim Lake, Modest Mouse, Jo Kondo, Paul Elwood, Hans Werner Henze (notably in his Sixth Symphony), Daniel Mason, Beck, the Water Tower Bucket Boys, Todd Taylor, J.P. Pickens, Peggy Honeywell, Norfolk & Western, Putnam Smith, Iron & Wine, The Avett Brothers, The Well Pennies, Punch Brothers, Julian Koster, Sufjan Stevens, and Sarah Jarosz.

George Gershwin includes a banjo in his opera Porgy and Bess

Frederick Delius wrote for a banjo in his opera Koanga.

Ernst Krenek includes two banjos in his Kleine Symphonie (Little Symphony).

Kurt Weill has a banjo in his opera The Rise and Fall of the City of Mahagonny.

Viktor Ullmann included a tenor banjo part in his Piano Concerto (op. 25).

Virgil Thomson includes a banjo in his orchestral music to accompany the film The Plow That Broke the Plains (1936).

=== Four-string banjos ===
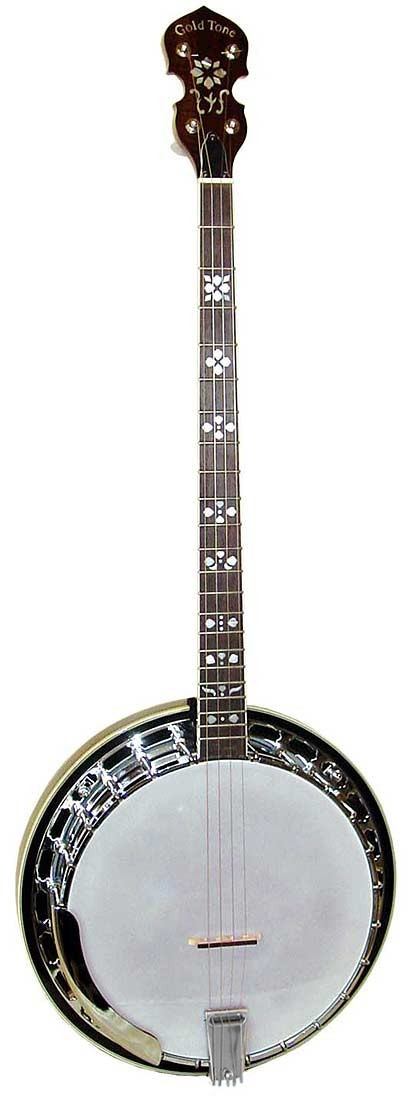
Plectrum banjo from Gold Tone

The four-string plectrum banjo is a standard banjo without the short drone string. It usually has 22 frets on the neck and a scale length of 26 to 28 inches, and was originally tuned C3 G3 B3 D4. It can also be tuned like the top four strings of a guitar, which is known as "Chicago tuning". As the name suggests, it is usually played with a guitar-style pick (that is, a single one held between thumb and forefinger), unlike the five-string banjo, which is either played with a thumbpick and two fingerpicks, or with bare fingers. The plectrum banjo evolved out of the five-string banjo, to cater to styles of music involving strummed chords. The plectrum is also featured in many early jazz recordings and arrangements.

Four-string banjos can be used for chordal accompaniment (as in early jazz), for single-string melody playing (as in Irish traditional music), in "chord melody" style (a succession of chords in which the highest notes carry the melody), in tremolo style (both on chords and single strings), and a mixed technique called "duo style" that combines single-string tremolo and rhythm chords.

Four-string banjos are used from time to time in musical theater. Examples include: Hello, Dolly!, Mame, Chicago, Cabaret, Oklahoma!, Half a Sixpence, Annie, Barnum, The Threepenny Opera, Monty Python's Spamalot, and countless others. Joe Raposo had used it variably in the imaginative seven-piece orchestration for the long-running TV show Sesame Street, and has sometimes had it overdubbed with itself or an electric guitar. The banjo is still (albeit rarely) in use in the show's arrangement currently.

==== Tenor banjo ====
Tenor banjos

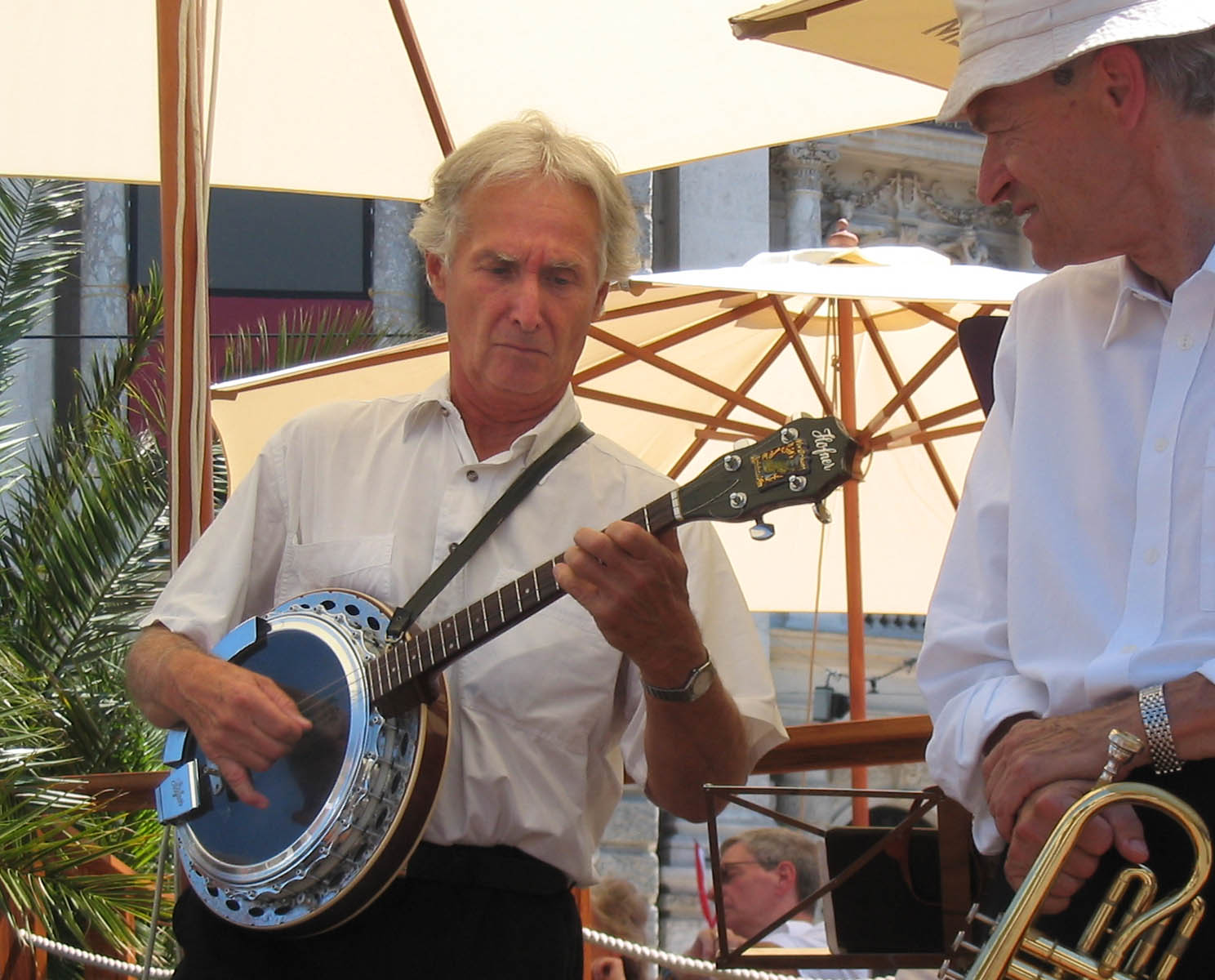
Man playing a four-string banjo.

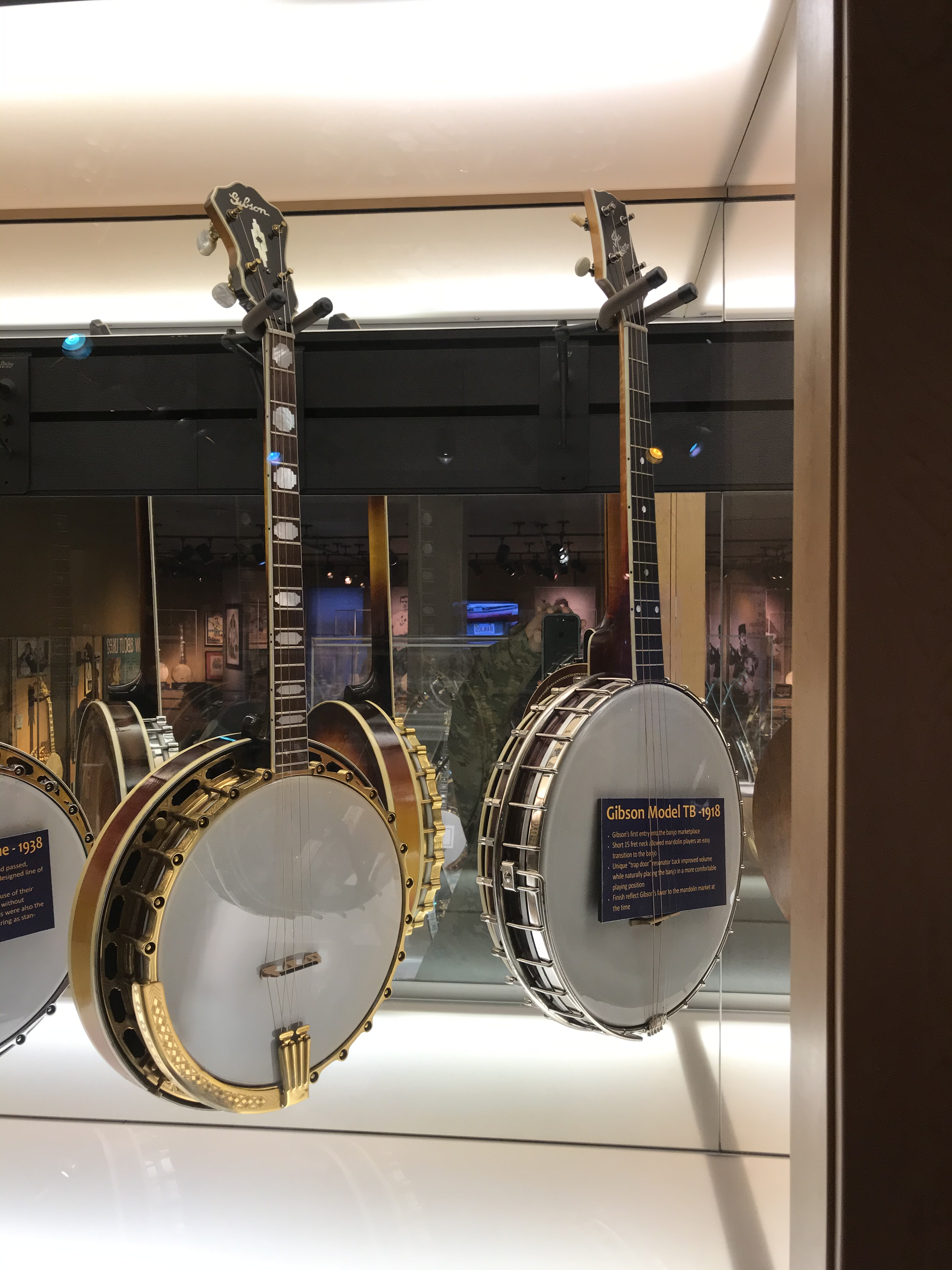
Two Gibson tenor banjos from the early 20th century at the American Banjo Museum. (Right) A 15 fret tenor banjo. (Left) A 19 fret tenor banjo.

The shorter-necked, tenor banjo, with 17 ("short scale") or 19 frets, is also typically played with a plectrum. It became a popular instrument after about 1910. Early models used for melodic picking typically had 17 frets on the neck and a scale length of 19 1/2 to 21 1/2 inches. By the mid-1920s, when the instrument was used primarily for strummed chordal accompaniment, 19-fret necks with a scale length of 21 3/4 to 23 inches became standard. The usual tuning is the all-fifths tuning C3 G3 D4 A4, in which exactly seven semitones (a perfect fifth) occur between the open notes of consecutive strings; this is identical to the tuning of a viola. Other players (particularly in Irish traditional music) tune the banjo G2 D3 A3 E4 like an octave mandolin, which lets the banjoist duplicate fiddle and mandolin fingering. The popularization of this tuning is usually attributed to the late Barney McKenna, banjoist with The Dubliners.

The tenor banjo was a common rhythm instrument in early 20th-century dance bands. Its volume and timbre suited early jazz (and jazz-influenced popular music styles) and could both compete with other instruments (such as brass instruments and saxophones) and be heard clearly on acoustic recordings. George Gershwin's Rhapsody in Blue, in Ferde Grofe's original jazz-orchestra arrangement, includes tenor banjo, with widely spaced chords not easily playable on plectrum banjo in its conventional tunings. With development of the archtop and electric guitar, the tenor banjo largely disappeared from jazz and popular music, though keeping its place in traditional "Dixieland" jazz.

Some 1920s Irish banjo players picked out the melodies of jigs, reels, and hornpipes on tenor banjos, decorating the tunes with snappy triplet ornaments. The most important Irish banjo player of this era was Mike Flanagan of the New York-based Flanagan Brothers, one of the most popular Irish-American groups of the day. Other pre-WWII Irish banjo players included Neil Nolan, who recorded with Dan Sullivan's Shamrock Band in Boston, and Jimmy McDade, who recorded with the Four Provinces Orchestra in Philadelphia. Meanwhile, in Ireland, the rise of ceili bands provided a new market for a loud instrument like the tenor banjo. Use of the tenor banjo in Irish music has increased greatly since the folk revival of the 1960s.

=== Six-string banjos ===
Old six-string zither banjo

The six-string banjo began as a British innovation by William Temlett, one of England's earliest banjo makers. He opened a shop in London in 1846, and sold seven-string banjos which he marketed as "zither" banjos from his 1869 patent. A zither banjo usually has a closed back and sides with the drum body and skin tensioning system suspended inside the wooden rim, the neck and string tailpiece mounted on the outside of the rim, and the drone string led through a tube in the neck so that the tuning peg can be mounted on the head. They were often made by builders who used guitar tuners that came in banks of three, so five-stringed instruments had a redundant tuner; these banjos could be somewhat easily converted over to a six-string banjo.

American Alfred Davis Cammeyer (1862–1949), a young violinist turned concert banjo player, devised the six-string zither banjo around 1880. British opera diva Adelina Patti advised Cammeyer that the zither banjo might be popular with English audiences as it had been invented there, and Cammeyer went to London in 1888. With his virtuoso playing, he helped show that banjos could make more sophisticated music than normally played by blackface minstrels. He was soon performing for London society, where he met Sir Arthur Sullivan, who recommended that Cammeyer progress from arranging the music of others for banjo to composing his own music.

Modern six-string bluegrass banjos have been made. These add a bass string between the lowest string and the drone string on a five-string banjo, and are usually tuned G_{4} G_{2} D_{3} G_{3} B_{3} D_{4}. Sonny Osborne played one of these instruments for several years. It was modified by luthier Rual Yarbrough from a Vega five-string model. A picture of Sonny with this banjo appears in Pete Wernick's Bluegrass Banjo method book.

Six-string banjos known as banjo guitars basically consist of a six-string guitar neck attached to a bluegrass or plectrum banjo body, which allows players who have learned the guitar to play a banjo sound without having to relearn fingerings. This was the instrument of the early jazz great Johnny St. Cyr, jazzmen Django Reinhardt, Danny Barker, Papa Charlie Jackson and Clancy Hayes, as well as the blues and gospel singer Reverend Gary Davis. Today, musicians as diverse as Keith Urban, Rod Stewart, Taj Mahal, Joe Satriani, David Hidalgo, Larry Lalonde and Doc Watson play the six-string guitar banjo. They have become increasingly popular since the mid-1990s.

== Banjo family and tuning ==
=== Low banjos ===
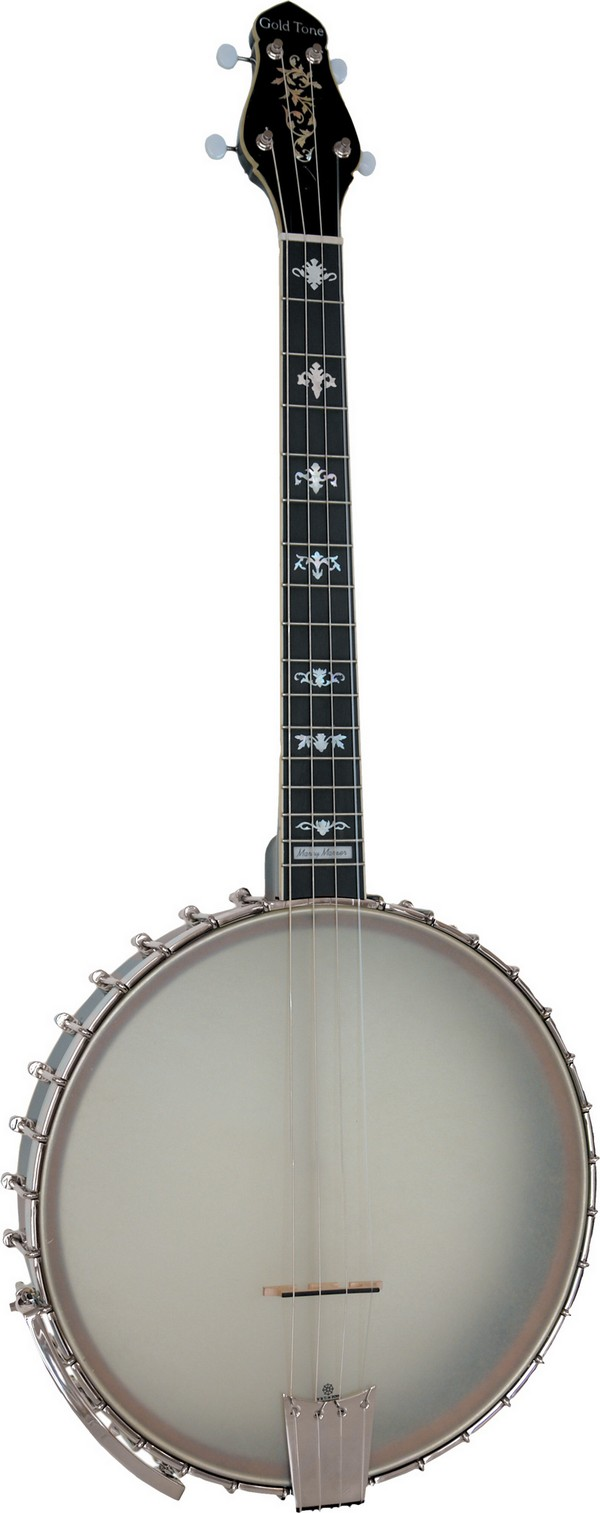
Cello banjo from Gold Tone

In the late 19th and early 20th centuries, in vogue in plucked-string instrument ensembles – guitar orchestras, mandolin orchestras, banjo orchestras – was when the instrumentation was made to parallel that of the string section in symphony orchestras. Thus, "violin, viola, 'cello, bass" became "mandolin, mandola, mandocello, mandobass", or in the case of banjos, "banjolin, banjola, banjo cello, bass banjo". Because the range of pluck-stringed instrument generally is not as great as that of comparably sized bowed-string instruments, other instruments were often added to these plucked orchestras to extend the range of the ensemble upwards and downwards.

The banjo cello was normally tuned C2-G2-D3-A3, one octave below the tenor banjo like the cello and mandocello. A five-string cello banjo, set up like a bluegrass banjo (with the short fifth string), but tuned one octave lower, has been produced by the Goldtone company.

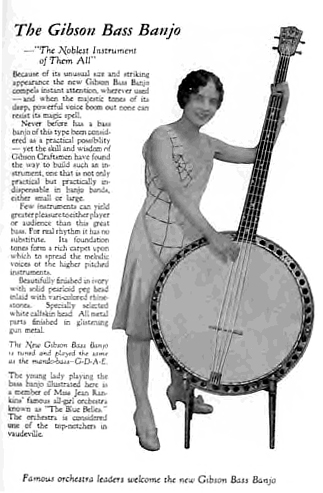
Bass banjo

Bass banjos have been produced in both upright bass formats and with standard, horizontally carried banjo bodies. Contrabass banjos with either three or four strings have also been made; some of these had headstocks similar to those of bass violins. Tuning varies on these large instruments, with four-string models sometimes being tuned in 4ths like a bass violin (E1-A1-D2-G2) and sometimes in 5ths, like a four-string cello banjo, one octave lower (C1-G1-D2-A2).

=== Long neck banjos ===
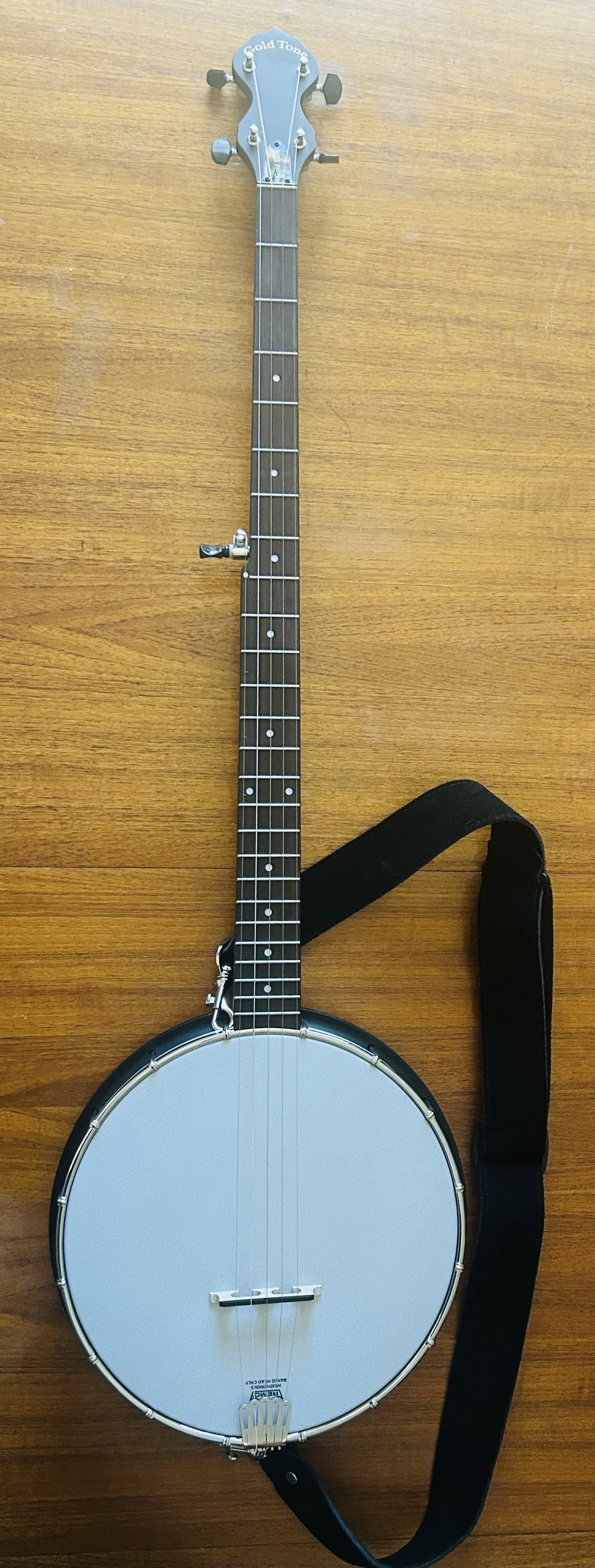
Long neck banjo by Gold Tone

Also called Seeger banjos for having been invented by Pete Seeger, these banjos feature three extra frets, giving the instrument a longer neck and greater playing versatility. With three extra frets, these banjos can be played one-and-a-half steps lower than a regular banjo, which some players find advantageous for singing or playing along. They are almost always open-backed. Notably, the drone strings on Seeger banjos are not pushed three frets back, so the tuning peg for the 5th string is in line with the 8th fret instead of the 5th fret.

=== Banjo hybrids and variants ===
A number of hybrid instruments exist, crossing the banjo with other stringed instruments. Most of these use the body of a banjo, often with a resonator, and the neck of the other instrument. Examples include the banjo mandolin (first patented in 1882) and the banjo ukulele, most famously played by the English comedian George Formby. These were especially popular in the early decades of the 20th century, and were probably a result of a desire either to allow players of other instruments to jump on the banjo bandwagon at the height of its popularity, or to get the natural amplification benefits of the banjo resonator in an age before electric amplification.

Conversely, the tenor and plectrum guitars use the respective banjo necks on guitar bodies. They arose in the early 20th century as a way for banjo players to double on guitar without having to relearn the instrument entirely.

Instruments that have a five-string banjo neck on a wooden body (for example, a guitar, bouzouki, or dobro body) have also been made, such as the banjola. A 20th-century Turkish instrument similar to the banjo is called the cümbüş, which combines a banjo-like resonator with a neck derived from an oud. At the end of the 20th century, a development of the five-string banjo was the BanSitar. This features a bone bridge, giving the instrument a sitar-like resonance.

The Brazilian samba banjo is basically a cavaquinho neck on a banjo body, thereby producing a louder sound than the cavaquinho. It is tuned the same as the top 4 strings of a 5-string banjo up an octave (or any cavaquinho tuning).

== Noted banjoists ==
- Joel Sweeney (1810–1860), AKA Joe Sweeney, was an early white blackface minstrel performer. He popularized banjo and advanced the physical development of the modern five-string banjo.
- Vess Ossman (1868–1923) was one of the first recording artists ever and a popular one. He formed various recording groups, the biggest being the Ossman-Dudley trio.
- Uncle Dave Macon (1870–1952) was a banjo player and comedian known for his "million dollar Tennessee smile."
- Fred Van Eps (1878–1960) was a noted five-string player and banjo maker who recorded the earliest ragtime records in any medium other than player piano.
- Frank Lawes (1894–1970), was a British banjoist who developed a unique four-string plectrum fingerstyle technique and a prolific composer of still well-known banjo music.
- Pasquale Troise (1895–1957) was an Italian British musician whose group Troise and his Banjoliers recorded for Decca and performed regularly on the BBC's long-running series Music While You Work.
- Harry Reser (1896–1965) was a plectrum player and top tenor banjoist of the 1920s, who wrote works for the tenor banjo and numerous method books for banjo and other stringed instruments, and who developed the "chord melody" technique.
- Roy Smeck (1900–1994). Nicknamed "Wizard of the Strings", Smeck was an early radio and recording pioneer and author of many instructional books.
- Eddie Peabody (1902–1970) known as "King of the Banjo," was a plectrum banjoist and prolific recording artist who developed new instruments, produced records, and appeared in movies.
- Ola Belle Reed (1916–2002) was an Appalachian American folk singer, songwriter, and banjo player.
- Pete Seeger (1919–2014) was a legendary singer-songwriter who came to fame with folk group the Weavers. His 1948 method book How to Play the Five-String Banjo has been widely played. He is credited with inventing the long-neck banjo (also known as the "Seeger Banjo"), which adds three lower frets to the five-string banjo's neck and tunes the four main strings down by a minor third, to facilitate playing in singing keys more comfortable for some folk guitarists.
- Earl Scruggs (1924–2012) is widely regarded as the father of the bluegrass style of banjo playing. The three-finger banjo style he developed while playing with Bill Monroe's band is known by his name: Scruggs Style.
- Ralph Stanley (1927–2016) of the Stanley Brothers and the Clinch Mountain Boys, was a member of the Grand Ole Opry and won a Grammy Award for Best Male Country Vocal Performance in the movie O Brother, Where Art Thou?.
- Charlie Tagawa (1935–2017) was a Japanese-born American ragtime and dixieland stylist and 2003 inductee into the National Four-String Banjo Hall of Fame.
- Barney McKenna (1939–2012), a founding member of The Dubliners, a multi-instumentalist most renowned as a banjoist, McKenna was responsible for making the GDAE-tuned tenor banjo the standard in Irish music.
- Béla Fleck (b. 1958) is widely acknowledged as one of the world's most innovative and technically proficient banjo players. His work spans genres, including jazz, bluegrass, classical, R&B, avant garde, and "world music", and he has produced a substantial discography and videography.
- Howard Alden (b. 1958), a jazz guitarist, began his career on tenor banjo and still plays it in jazz settings.
- Cynthia Sayer (b. 1962) is regarded as one of the top jazz plectrum banjoists.
- Rhiannon Giddens (b. 1977) is likely the most noted African American banjoist today. Also a vocalist and fiddler, she plays many African American styles, from folk music to contemporary genres. Now recording and performing under her own name, she rose to prominence playing with the Carolina Chocolate Drops.
- Noam Pikelny (b. 1981) is an American banjoist who plays bluegrass, classical, rock, and jazz. He has been nominated for eight Grammys and has been awarded one with his band, the Punch Brothers, in 2018.
- Winston Marshall (b. 1988), a rock and country performer, plays banjo (among other instruments) for the British folk rock group Mumford and Sons, a band that won the 2013 Grammy Award for "Best Album of the Year".

== See also ==
- Akonting
- Banjo (samba)
- Banjo ukulele
- Benju
- BMG movement
- Bulbul tarang
- Cuatro (instrument)
- Double-neck guitjo
- Sanshin
- Stringed instrument tunings
- Ngoni
- 6-string banjo (banjitar / guitjo)
- Resonator banjo
