= List of national instruments (music) =

This list contains musical instruments of symbolic or cultural importance within a nation, state, ethnicity, tribe or other group of people.

In some cases, national instruments remain in wide use within the nation (such as the Puerto Rican cuatro), but in others, their importance is primarily symbolic (such as the Welsh triple harp). Danish ethnologist Lisbet Torp has concluded that some national instrument traditions, such as the Finnish kantele, are invented, pointing to the "influence of intellectuals and nationalists in the nationwide promotion of selected musical instruments as a vehicle for nationalistic ideas". Governments do not generally officially recognize national instruments; some exceptions being the Paraguayan harp, the Japanese koto and the Trinidadian steelpan.

This list compiles instruments that have been alleged to be a national instrument by any of a variety of sources, and an instrument's presence on the list does not indicate that its status as a national instrument is indisputable, only that its status has been credibly argued. Each instrument on this list has a Hornbostel-Sachs number immediately below it. This number indicates the instrument's classification within the Hornbostel-Sachs system (H-S), which organizes instruments numerically based on the manner in which they produce sound.

Images and recordings are supplied where available; note that there are often variations within a national musical tradition, and thus the images and recordings may not be accurate in depicting the entire spectrum of the given nation's music, and that some images and recordings may be taken from a region outside the core of the national instrument's home when such distinctions have little relevance to the information present in the image and recordings. A number of countries have more than one instrument listed, each having been described as a national instrument, not usually by the same source; neither the presence of multiple entries for one nation, nor for multiple nations for one instrument, on this list is reflective of active dispute in any instance. Alternative names and spellings are given. These mostly come from alternative spellings within English or alternative methods of transliterating from a foreign language to English, such as the Chinese yangqin, also transliterated yang ch'in and yang qin. Others reflect regions or subcultures within a given nation, such as the Australian didgeridoo which is or has been called didjeridu, yidaki, yiraki, magu, kanbi and ihambilbilg in various Australian Aboriginal languages. All non-English words are italicized.

| Nation | Instrument | Description Recording | H-S number | Image |
|---|---|---|---|---|
| Afghanistan | rubab rabab | Short-necked three-stringed lute with sympathetic and drone strings, fretted and plucked with a plectrum, with a double-chambered body, the lower part of which is covered in skin, and with three main strings | 321.321-6 | |
| Albania | Çiftelia; Gajde; Lahuta | | | |
| Arab world | oud | Pear-shaped fretless stringed instrument, with five courses of two strings and a single eleventh string, a bent back and a bowl-shaped body, often with up to three soundholes, played with a pick | 321.321-6 | |
| Argentina | bandoneón | Button accordion with a box shape, played with both hands using buttons that produce two sets of notes per hand | 412.132 | |
| Argentina | guitar | Fretted stringed instrument with a hollow body and a soundboard | 321.322 | |
| Armenia | duduk daduk | Double-reed pipe with wide reeds made from pieces of cane in a duckbill-type assembly, generally diatonic and with a single octave range | 421.211.12 | |
| Australian, Indigenous | didgeridoo didjeridu, yidaki, yiraki, magu, kanbi, ihambilbilg | Straight trumpet without fingerholes, traditionally made from a trunk or thick branch of a tree, sometimes with a rim of beeswax around the blowing end, requires circular breathing | 423.121.11 | |
| Austria, Czechia | Bock; Bockpfeife | Use of goatskins in constructing the bag, similar to the common use of other goat-terms for bagpipes in other nations | 422.112.2-62 + 422.221.1-621 | |
| Azerbaijan | balaban | Set of cylindrical shawm-like instruments, with an air reservoir like a bagpipe | 422.121-62 | |
| Baganda peoples of Uganda | endongo | Bowl lyre made of lizardskin with strings tied to a piece of wood inserted into two holes on two arms | 321.21 | |
| Balochs | suroz | Bowed string instrument with a long neck, similar to a fiddle or sarangi and played vertically | 321.322 | — |
| Bangladesh | dotara | Small stringed instrument, with plucked metal strings, elongated belly as soundboard and narrow neck ending in a pegbox, decorated with carvings of animals and covered with skin | 321.322 | |
| Bashkir | kurai | Long open endblown flute with five fingerholes | 421.111.12 | |
| Basotho | lesiba | Stringed instrument, blown rather than plucked or strummed, with a single string and tuning noose attached both to a bow and a feather quill, with a frame made from a coconut shell | 311.121.222 | |
| Bavaria | zither Volkszither | Stringed instrument with a soundbox, with strings stretched across it, originally with four melody strings and no more than fifteen accompaniment strings | 314.122 | |
| Bhutan | dranyen dranyen, dramnyen | Seven-stringed lute, fretless, long-necked and double-waisted with rosette-shaped sound hole | 321.321 | |
| Bolivia | charango charanga | Fretted, hollow-bodied bowl lute, usually with four or five doubled strings, with as many as eleven tunings, traditionally made from an armadillo shell | 321.321-6 | |
| Brazil | guitar violão | Fretted six-stringed instrument with a soundboard and a hollow body, originally with steel strings, but now more commonly with nylon | 321.322 | |
| Brazil | berimbau | Single-stringed musical bow Toque de Angola on unaccompanied berimbau | 311.121.221 | |
| Brazil | pandeiro | Handheld frame drum with metal jingles (platinelas) attached, tuned through adjusting the tension of the head, can also be shaken or rasped | 211.311 + 112.122 | |
| Bulgaria | gaida | Bagpipe with three types of chanters, one a simple reed, open at one end, another a small, conical tube with eight fingerholes, one of which is the flea-hole (a small hole made out of a tube that can raise any note a half-step), and the last is a long, no-holed drone | 422.22-62 | |
| Catalonia | flabiol | Woodwind musical instrument of the fipple flutes family. It is one of the 12 instruments of the cobla, for sardana dances and in other Catalan folk music ensembles. The flabiol measures about 25 centimeters in length and has five or six holes on its front face and three underneath. | 421.211.12 | |
| China | guqin qin | A plucked seven-string zither with open strings and a range of about four octaves | 312.22 | |
| China | guzheng zheng, gu-zheng | Half-tube zither, rectangular with three sound holes on the bottom, now with twenty-one strings most typically, pentatonic tuning, strings are plucked by hand | 312.22-5 | |
| China | pipa | Pear-shaped bowl lute with a neck, played by plucking | 321.321-5 | |
| China | yangqin yang ch'in, yang qin | Hammered dulcimer, with a trapezoidal sounding board and traditionally bronze strings, struck with rubber-tipped bamboo hammers | 314.122-4 | |
| Colombia | Tiple Colombiano; Tiple | Small guitar-like fretted instrument with twelve strings arranged in four triple-strung courses. | 321.322 | |
| Costa Rica | marimba | Xylophone-like instrument with gourd resonators, two sets of overlapping keys, struck with mallets | 111.222-4 | |
| Corsica | cetera ceterina, cetara | A musical instrument of the cittern family, common in Corsica. | 111.224-4 | |
| Crete | lyra | Three-stringed fretted, pear-shaped instrument with a hollow body and a vaulted back, propped up on the knee | 321.21 | |
| Croatia | tamburica and Lijerica tamburitza | Lute-like stringed instrument with a long neck, picked or strummed, variable number of strings | 321.321 | |
| Cuba | tres | Guitar-like instrument with a neck and three courses of two strings each | 321.322 | |
| Dagara peoples of Ghana | gyil | Xylophone-like calabash gourd with holes covered in spider silk, wooden frame, struck with a hammer | 111.222-4 | |
| Ecuador | rondador | Set of chorded bamboo panpipes that produces two tones simultaneously, consisting of pieces of cane, placed side by side in order by size and closed at one end, played by blowing across the top of the instrument | 421.112.11 | |
| Egypt, Ancient | harp | Open harp, used in widely varying forms, though originally semi-circular and with five to seven strings, number of strings increased over time, while the size decreased | 322.12 | |
| Egypt, Ancient | sistrum | U-shaped frame drum with small rings that make sound when shaken | 112.112 | |
| England | English concertina | A small free reed instrument, usually hexagonal in shape. The instrument is played by moving bellows between the hands to blow air over reeds, each note being sounded by a button. | 412.132 | |
| England | Northumbrian smallpipes | Bellows-blown bagpipes from Northeastern England consisting of a single chanter (generally with keys) and usually four drones. | 422.112 | |
| Etruria | kithara | Stringed instrument with a deep soundbox made of two tables, connected by ribs, with strings attached to a tuning bar, played with a plectrum | 321.22 | |
| Finland | kantele kannel | Zither–harp, traditionally with five strings, now with up to thirty, held in the lap | 314.122 | |
| Finland, especially Swedish-speaking Finns | violin | Four stringed instrument, bowed, hourglass-shape and an arched top and back chords on a violin | 321.322 | |
| Fula | tambin sereendu, fulannu | Diagonal diatonic flute without a bell, made from a conical vine, with three finger-holes and a rectangular embouchere with two wings on either side | 411.111.22 | — |
| Galicia | gaita gaita de fole, gaita galega | Diatonic bagpipe with a conical chanter and at least one bass drone, used to accompany both spiritual and secular, as well as lyric and dance music, usually accompanied by a drum (tambour) | 422.211.2-62 | |
| Germany | waldzither German lute, also applied to the lute guitar | Cittern with nine steel strings; tuned C, G G, C C, E E, G G; famous for allegedly been played by Martin Luther at the Wartburg | 321.322 | |
| Greece, Ancient | aulos auloi | Highly variant double-shawm with a cylindrical bore | 422.121 | |
| Greece, Ancient | lyre | Stringed instrument, strummed with a plectrum, with the free hand silencing unwanted strings, traditionally made from a tortoise shell | 321.21 | |
| Greece, Modern | bouzouki | String instrument with a pear-shaped body and a long neck, played with plectrum | 321.321 | |
| Guatemala | marimba | Xylophone-like instrument with gourd resonators, struck with mallets, with a two level keyboard so it can play the full chromatic scale | 111.222-4 | |
| Hawaii | ukulele | String instrument derived from the Portuguese braguinha, from the Hawaiian uku lele, jumping flea, referring to the swift fingerwork the instrument requires chords on a ukulele | 321.322 | |
| Hungary | cimbalom czimbalom, cymbalom, cymbalum, ţambal, tsymbaly, tsimbl, santouri, santur | Chromatic hammered dulcimer with four legs | 314.122-4 | |
| Hungary | tárogató töröksíp, Schunda-tárogató, magyar zurna | Woodwind instrument commonly used in Hungarian folk music. There are two variants, the original tárogató, also called töröksíp, which is a reed aerophone instrument similar to zurna. The modern tárogató was invented by József Schunda and resembles more to saxophone. | 422.212 | — |
| India | saraswati veena vina | Semitonically fretted lute with a long, cylindrical shape, resting on two gourds | 311.222 | |
| Indonesia | angklung | Two bamboo tubes, closed at one end and with tongues, attached to a square frame, played by shaking from side to side, causing the tongues to vibrate | 112.122 | |
| Iran | tar | The musical instrument, which has 6 wires and is the main instrument in traditional Iranian music, is produced by Mazzrab. | 314.122-4 | |
| Ireland | Irish Harp (Cruit or Cláirseach) | Polychord wire-strung harp with a fore-pillar | 322.221 | |
| Ireland | Great Irish Warpipes Píob Mhór | In modern times this instrument is essentially identical to the Great Highland Bagpipe | 422.112.2-62 + 422.221.1-621 | — |
| Ireland | Uilleann Pipes Píobaí Uilleann, Union Pipes | Pump blown Bagpipe | {{{Number}}} | |
| Israel | kinnor David's harp | Biblically described historic instrument, probably a cithara; in modern Hebrew, refers to the violin | 321.22 | |
| Italy | mandolin | Stringed instrument Mandolin performance | 321.321 | |
| Japan | koto | Long and hollow thirteen-stringed instrument | 312.22-7 | |
| Jewish | shofar | Horn, flattened by heat and hollowed, used for more religious than purely secular purposes, made from the horn of an animal, most typically a ram or kudu | 423.121.1 | |
| Kazakhstan | dombra | Fretted, long-necked lute with a round body, played by plucking with a plectrum | 321.321-6 | |
| Kenya | nyatiti | 3-foot-long (0.91 m) harp, plucked with both hands, made of wood and goat or antelope skin | 321.21-5 | |
| Khoikhoi | goura | Single stringed instrument, blown rather than plucked or strummed, with the string attached to a coconut shell resonator and with a tension noose wrapped around the string to adjust the pitch | 311.121.222 | — |
| Korea | gayageum kayagum, kayago | zither-like string instrument, with 12 strings. | 312.22-5 | |
| Kyrgyzstan | komuz | Three-stringed fretless lute, made from wood with gut strings | 321.321 | |
| Lanna (Northern Thailand) | pin pia | Chest-resonated stick zither with two to five strings | 311.221 | — |
| Laos | khene khaen | Mouth organ with bamboo tubes, attached in pairs to the mouthpiece, and with fixed free reeds | 412.132 | |
| Latvia | kokles kūkles | Diatonic, lute-like string instrument | 314.122 | |
| Lebanon | darbuka debakeh | Goblet-shaped hand drum | 211.261.21 | |
| Lithuania | birbyne | Aerophone, can be single- or double-reed, with or without a mouthpiece | 422 | |
| Lithuania | kanklė | Stringed instrument | 314.122 | |
| Lobi peoples of Ghana | gyil | Keyed calabash gourds with holes covered in spider silk, wooden frame | 111.222-4 | |
| Madagascar | valiha | Tubular zither | 312.11 | |
| Mandinka of West Africa | balo balafon, bala, balafo, bala, balaphone, balaphon, balaphong, balphone, balangi, balani, gyil | Set of wooden pieces, mounted on gourds, in a frame and played using two rubber-tipped mallets, held in hands with iron cylinders and rings attached to add a jingling sound | 111.212 + 112.111 | — |
| Maroons of Jamaica | abeng | Aerophone made from the end of a cow horn with the tip broken off on the side, which is blown into | 423.122.2 | — |
| Mexico | marimba | Xylophone-like instrument with wooden square tubes resonators, struck with mallets, with a two level keyboard so it can play the full chromatic scale | 111.222-4 | |
| Mongolia | morin khuur horse-head fiddle, igil | Two-stringed instrument, held between the legs, with a trapezoidal body and a horse's head typically carved on the upper edge of the pegbox | 321.322 | |
| Montenegro | gusle | Stringed instrument, round, typically with one string bound at the top of the neck with a tuning peg | 321.321-71 | |
| Myanmar | saung-gauk saung, Burmese harp | Arched harp with sixteen strings, attached to the harp with red cotton tassels | 322.11 | |
| Nepal | madal | Double-headed cylindrical drum, slightly bulging at the waist, held horizontally and played double-handed | 211.212.1 | |
| Netherlands | fiddle | Four-stringed instrument, bowed | 321.322 | |
| Nicaragua | marimba | Xylophone-like instrument with gourd resonators | 111.222-4 | |
| Norway | Hardingfele; Hardanger fiddle | Ornately decorated fiddle with four main strings and four resonating strings beneath them, which are not touched by the bow | 321.322-71 | |
| Norway | langeleik | Rectangular zither with five or six strings, one melody string and several drone strings | 314.122 | |
| Pakistan | Daf dafli, dap, def, tef, defi, gaval, duf, duff, dof | It is a Pakistani version of frame drum musical instrument | 211.311 | |
| Paraguay | harp, Paraguayan | Diatonic harp with 32, 36, 38 or 40 strings, made from tropical wood and with songs in the Guarani language, with an exaggerated neck-arch, played with the fingernail | 322.211 | |
| Peru | cajón | Wooden box with a hole in one side, derived from containers used to transport agricultural products by portworkers | 111.221 | |
| Peru | charango charanga, chillador | Guitar-like instrument, most commonly with ten strings in two courses and made from an armadillo back | 321.321-6 | |
| Philippines | Kudyapi | rondalla plucked chordophone with 14 strings tuned F# B E A D G. | 321.321 | |
| Polynesia | nose flute | Flute, made from a single piece of bamboo, with three holes to blow into from the nostrils, with fingerholes | 421.111.22 | |
| Portugal | Portuguese guitar | Fretted stringed instrument with a hollow body | 321.322 | |
| Puerto Rico | cuatro | Fretted stringed instrument with a hollow body, derived from the Spanish tiple and other stringed instruments, made from carved wood with strings (ten, in five sets of two) of leather strips or dried animal gut | 321.322 | |
| Rome, Ancient | tibiae aulos (Greek name) | Double-reed shawm, played paired | 422.122 | |
| Russia | Garmon | Garmon, bellow-driven free reed with keys or buttons to modify the air flow chords on an accordion | 412.132 | |
| Russia | balalaika | Family of triangle-shaped lute-type instruments | 321.32 | |
| Russia | gusli | Zither-like instrument with between eleven and thirty-six strings, tuned diatonically | 314.122 | |
| Russia | spoons | Painted wooden teaspoons, used as a percussion instrument | 111.141 | |
| Ryukyus of Japan | sanshin | Three stringed banjo-like instrument, covered with snakeskin | 321.312-6 | |
| Sakha | khomus | jaw harp, made from a reed attached to a frame, plucked | 121.221 | |
| Scotland | bagpipe, highland | Bagpipe with a chanter, blowpipe, two tenor drones and a bass drone | 422.112.2-62 + 422.221.1-621 | |
| Serbia | Accordion | Accordion, bellow-driven free reed with keys or buttons to modify the air flow chords on an accordion | 412.132 | |
| Serbia | frula svirala, jedinka | End-blown wooden flute with six fingerholes | 421.211.12 | |
| Serbia | gajda Surle | Bagpipe with three types of chanters, one a simple reed, open at one end, another a small, conical tube with eight fingerholes, one of which is the flea-hole (a small hole made out of a tube that can raise any note a half-step), and the last is a long, no-holed drone | 422.22-62 | |
| Serbia | gusle | Stringed instrument, round, typically with one string bound at the top of the neck with a tuning peg Serbian gusle | 321.321-71 | |
| Slovakia | fujara | Endblown long bass diatonic fipple flute | 421.211.12 | |
| Slovenia | accordion | Accordion, bellow-driven free reed with keys or buttons to modify the air flow chords on an accordion | 412.132 | |
| South Africa | lesiba rattle stick | The lesiba, and gora or goura, are members of a class of "unbraced mouth-resonated bow[s]" with a flattened quill attached to a long string, stretched over a hard stick, acting as the main source of vibration | 423.121.12 | — |
| Spain | guitar | Fretted stringed instrument, long-necked with a flat soundboard and back, and incurved sides | 321.322 | |
| Sweden | drejelire | Hurdy-gurdy that uses a rosined wheel to create sound | 321.322-72 | |
| Sweden | nyckelharpa | Bowed keyed fiddle | 321.322-71 | |
| Swedish Estonia | talharpa | Bowed lyre with no fingerboard | 321.22-71 | |
| Switzerland | alphorn | Long wooden conical trumpet, bent at the end, with turned boxwood mouthpieces, traditionally used by herdsmen | 423.121.12 | |
| Trinidad and Tobago | steelpan | Barrel-shaped percussion instruments, tuned chromatically, originally made from discarded 55 gallon drums | 111.241.2 | |
| Turkey | saz bağlama, kopuz | Fretted lute with a long neck, pear-shaped body, and three courses of seven steel strings | 321.321-6 | |
| Turkmenistan | dutar | Plucked string instrument with two strings and a long neck, strummed or plucked | 321.322 | |
| Tuva | igil Horse-head fiddle | Small fiddle | 321.322 | |
| Tuva | khomus | Jaw harp, made from a reed attached to a frame, plucked | 121.221 | |
| Tuva | morin khuur Horse-head fiddle | Large fiddle with a wooden sound box and two strings attached to tuning pegs in the neck | 321.322 | |
| Ukraine | bandura | Diatonic, unfretted lute-like string instrument, traditionally carved from a single block of wood | 321.321 | |
| United States | Appalachian dulcimer dulcimer, mountain dulcimer, lap dulcimer, fretted dulcimer, dulcimore, et al. | Fretted string instrument of the zither family, typically with three or four strings, originally played in the Appalachian region of the United States. The body extends the length of the fingerboard, and its fretting is generally diatonic. | 321.312-5 | |
| United States | banjo | Membrane-topped four or five string fretted instrument, plucked or strummed with fingers or a plectrum. Probably African American in origin. | 321.312-5 | |
| Uzbekistan | doira | Round, flat drum with shakers made of metal inside and a horse-skin head | 211.311 + 112.113 | |
| Uzbekistan | karnay | Long brass trumpet with a mouthpiece | 423.121.12 | |
| Venezuela | cuatro | Guitar-like lute with four strings, usually strummed | 321.322 | |
| Venezuela | harp, Venezuelan | Diatonic harp, with an exaggerated neck arch, similar to the Paraguayan harp | 322.211 | |
| Vietnam | đàn bầu | | 321.22 | |
| Wales | crwth | Six-stringed instrument with a flat fingerboard, fretless | 321.22 | |
| Wales | harp, triple telyn | Harp with no blades or levers, with three rows of strings, the outer two tuned in a diatonic scale and the inner one tuned to the extra semitones of the chromatic scale | 322.212.1 | |
| Yugoslavia | gusle | Stringed instrument, round, typically with one string bound at the top of the neck with a tuning peg Serbian gusle | 321.321-71 | |
| Zimbabwe | mbira thumb piano | Plucked lamellophone, consisting of staggered keys attached to a board, with a halved calabash gourd as resonator | 122.12 | |
