= Yoke lutes =

Class of string instruments

Yoke lutes, commonly called lyres, are a class of string instruments, subfamily of lutes, indicated with the codes 321.21 and 321.22 in the Hornbostel–Sachs classification.

== Description ==
Yoke lutes are defined as instruments with one or more strings, arranged parallel to the sound board and attached to a yoke lying on the same plane as the sound table, composed of two arms and a crosspiece. All of the instruments of the ancient Greek lyre family were played by strumming the strings, but modern African lyres are most often plucked; a few yoke lutes are played with a bow.

The sound box can be either bowl-shaped (321.21) or box-shaped (321.22). In the first case, the resonator is often a turtle shell, while the sound board is made of leather. In the second case, usually both the body and the sound board are made of wood.

== Examples ==
Examples of yoke lutes are the lyre, the kithara, the barbiton, and the phorminx from Ancient Greece, and the biblical kinnor, all of which were strummed instruments, with the fingers dampening the unwanted notes in the chord.

Africa has continuous living traditions of yoke lutes, most of which are plucked, among them the begena, endongo, kissar, krar, litungu, nyatiti, obokano, simsimiyya, and tanbūra. Scandinavia, Finland/Karelia, and Britain also have a bowed yoke-lute tradition in the Crwth, Jouhikko and Talharpa.

== Contrary examples ==
However, there are other instruments called "lyra" or "lira" which, from an organological point of view, do not belong to this family; they are instead handle lutes. For example: The Byzantine lyra, the Calabrian lira, the Cretan lyra, the lira da braccio, and the lyra viol.
