= Lyre =

Ancient Greek string instrument

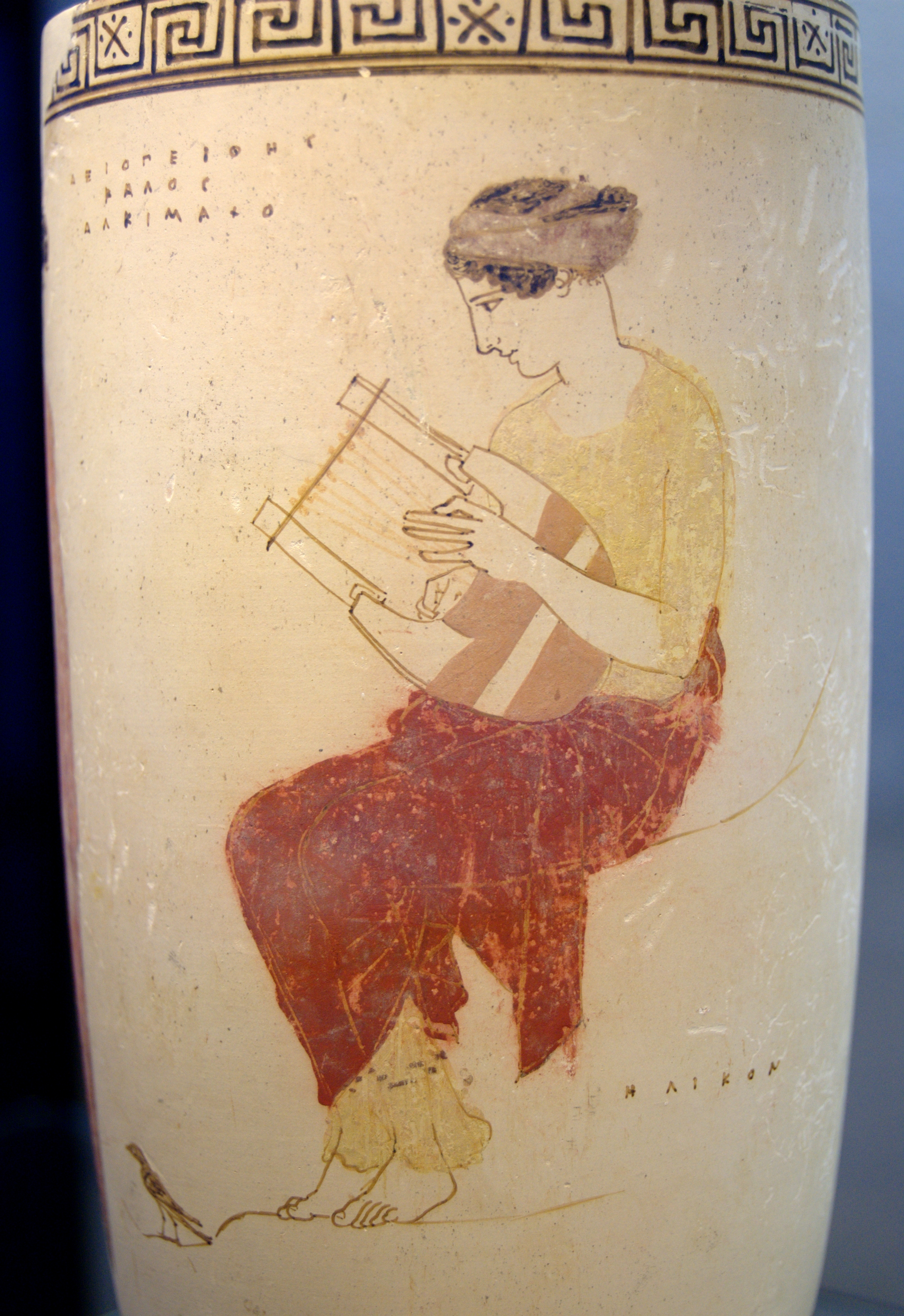
- Greek vase with muse playing the phorminx, a type of lyre

String instrument
- Hornbostel–Sachs classification: 321.2 (Composite chordophone sounded with a plectrum)
- Developed: Sumer, Iraq, Bronze Age

Related instruments
- Barbitos; Çeng; Chang (instrument); Cithara or Kithara; Crwth; Endongo; Harp; Konghou; Krar; Rotte or Germanic lyre

The lyre (/ˈlaɪər/) (from Greek λύρα and Latin lyra) is a stringed musical instrument that is classified by Hornbostel–Sachs as a member of the lute family of instruments. In organology, a lyre is considered a yoke lute, since it is a lute in which the strings are attached to a yoke that lies in the same plane as the sound table, and consists of two arms and a crossbar.

The lyre has its origins in ancient history. Lyres were used in several ancient cultures surrounding the Mediterranean Sea. The earliest known examples of the lyre have been recovered at archeological sites that date to c. 2700 BC in Mesopotamia. The oldest lyres from the Fertile Crescent are known as the eastern lyres and are distinguished from other ancient lyres by their flat base. They have been found at archaeological sites in Egypt, Syria, Anatolia, and the Levant. In a discussion of the Nubian lyre, Carl Engel notes that modern Egyptians call it qytarah barbarîyeh, reflecting its association with the Barbaras (Berbers)—linked to the brbrta of ancient Egyptian references to Punt, a region identified with present-day Somalia, where the shareero lyre remains in use.

The round lyre or the Western lyre also originated in Syria and Anatolia, but was not as widely used and eventually died out in the east c. 1750 BC. The round lyre, so called for its rounded base, reappeared in ancient Greece c. 1700–1400 BC, and then later spread throughout the Roman Empire. This lyre served as the origin of the European lyre known as the Germanic lyre or rotte that was widely used in north-western Europe from pre-Christian to medieval times.

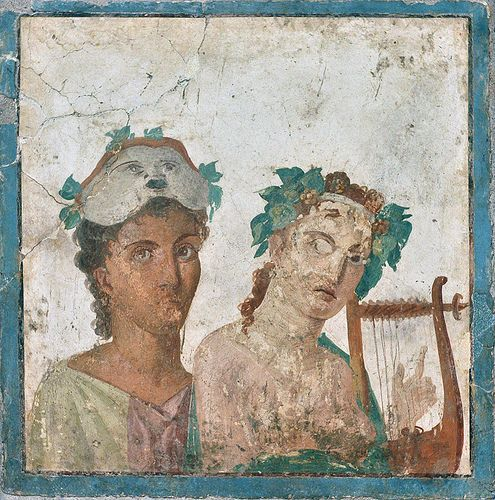
A Roman fresco from Pompeii, 1st century AD, depicting a man in a theatre mask and a woman wearing a garland while playing a lyre

== Etymology ==
The earliest reference to the word "lyre" is the Mycenaean Greek ru-ra-ta-e, meaning "lyrists" and written in the Linear B script. In classical Greek, the word "lyre" could either refer specifically to an amateur instrument, which is a smaller version of the professional cithara and eastern-Aegean barbiton, or "lyre" can refer generally to all three instruments as a family. The English word comes via Latin from the Greek.

== Classification ==
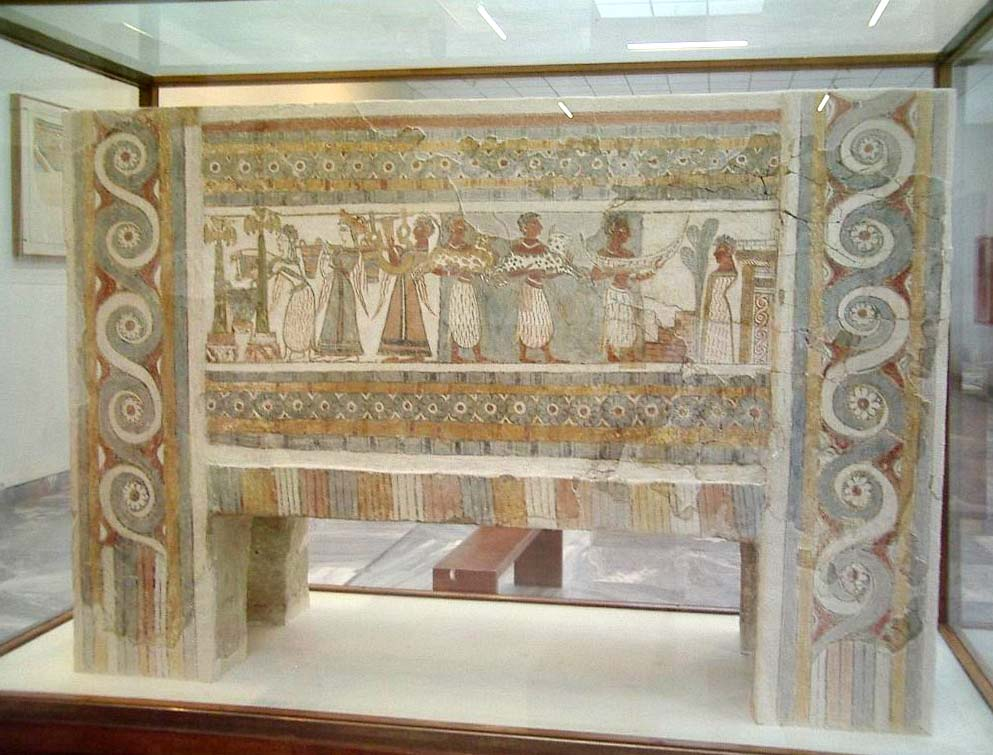
The Minoan sarcophagus of Hagia Triada, 14th century BCE, depicting the earliest lyre with seven strings, held by a man with long robe, third from the left.

Hornbostel–Sachs classifies the lyre as a member of the lute-family of instruments which is one of the families under the chordophone classification of instruments. Hornbostel–Sachs divide lyres into two groups, Bowl lyres (321.21) and Box lyres (321.22). In organology, a lyre is considered a yoke lute, since it is a lute in which the strings are attached to a yoke that lies in the same plane as the sound table, and consists of two arms and a crossbar.

== Ancient lyres ==
There is evidence of the development of many forms of lyres from the period 2700 BCE through 700 BCE. Lyres from the ancient world are divided by scholars into two separate groups, the eastern lyres and the western lyres, which are defined by patterns of geography and chronology.

=== Eastern lyres ===
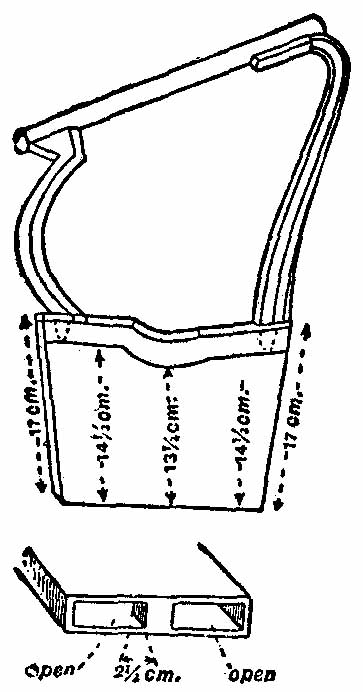
A lyre from Ancient Egypt, found in Thebes

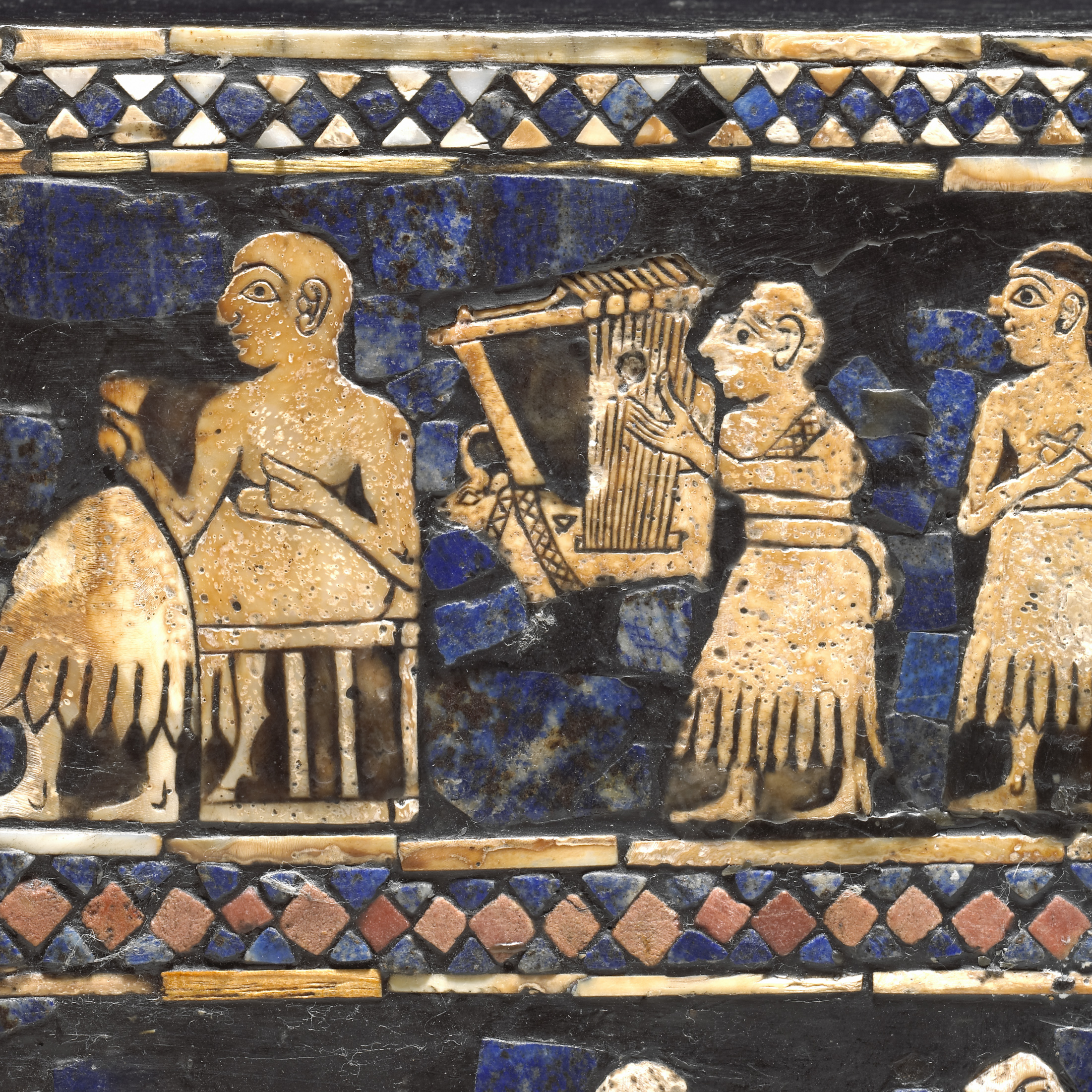
A bull lyrist on the Standard of Ur, c. 2500 BCE

Eastern lyres, also known as flat-based lyres, are lyres which originated in the Fertile Crescent (Mesopotamia) in what is present day Syria, Anatolia, the Levant and Egypt. The eastern lyres all contain sound boxes with flat bases. They are the oldest lyres with iconographical evidence of their existence, such as depictions of the eastern lyre on pottery, dating back to 2700 BCE.

While flat-based lyres originated in the East, they were also later found in the West after 700 BCE. By the Hellenistic period (c. 330 BCE) what was once a clearly divided use of flat-based lyres in the East and round-based lyres in the West had disappeared, as trade routes between the East and the West dispersed both kinds of instruments across more geographic regions.

Eastern lyres are divided into four main types: bull lyres, thick lyres, thin lyres and giant lyres.

==== Bull lyres ====
Bull lyres are a type of eastern lyre that have a flat base and bull's head on one side. The lyres of Ur are bull lyres excavated in ancient Mesopotamia (modern Iraq), which date to 2500 BCE and are considered to be the world's oldest surviving stringed instruments. However, older pictorial evidence of bull lyres exist in other parts of Mesopotamia and Elam, including Susa.

==== Thick lyres ====
Thick lyres are a type of flat-based eastern lyre that comes from Egypt (2000–100 BCE) and Anatolia (c. 1600 BCE). The thick lyre is distinguished by a thicker sound box which allowed for the inclusion of more strings. These strings were held on a larger 'box-bridge' than the other type of eastern lyres, and the sound hole of the instrument was cut in the body of the lyre behind the box-bridge.

While similar to the bull lyre in size, the thick lyre did not contain the head of an animal, but did depict images of animals on the arms or yoke of the instrument. Like the bull lyre, the thick lyre did not use a plectrum but was plucked by hand.

While the clearest examples of the thick lyre are extant to archaeological sites in Egypt and Anatolia, similar large lyres with thicker soundboxes have been found in Mesopotamia (1900–1500 BCE). However, these Mesopotamia lyres lack the box-bridge found in the instruments from Egypt and Anatolia.

==== Thin lyres ====
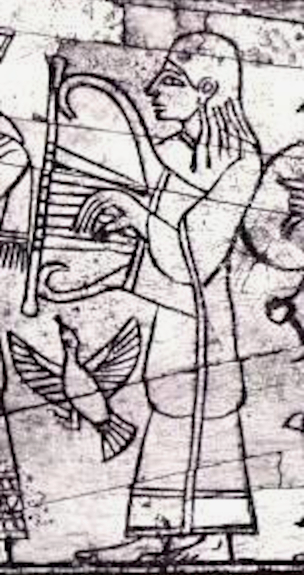
Excavated at Tel Megiddo, a lyre player 1350–1150 BCE, identified as a likely kinnor by scholars During the Iron Age, Megiddo was a royal city in the Kingdom of Israel.

Thin lyres are a type of flat-based eastern lyre with a thinner soundbox where the sound hole is created by leaving the base of the resonator open. The earliest known example of the thin lyre dates to c. 2500 BCE in Syria. After this, examples of the thin lyre can be found throughout the Fertile Crescent. The thin lyre is the only one of the ancient eastern lyres that is still used in instrument design today among current practitioners of the instrument. As a means of support, players of the thin lyre wear a sling around the left wrist which is also attached to the base of the lyre's right arm. It is played using a plectrum or pic to strike the strings; a technique later used by the Greeks on the western lyres.

There are several regional variations in the design of thin lyres. The Egyptian thin lyre was characterized by arms that bulged outwards asymmetrically; a feature also found later in Samaria (c. 375–323 BCE). In contrast, thin lyres in Syria and Phoenicia (c. 700 BCE) were symmetrical in shape and had straight arms with a perpendicular yoke which formed the outline of a rectangle.

The kinnor is an ancient Israelite musical instrument that is thought to be a type of thin lyre based on iconographic archaeological evidence. It is the first instrument from the lyre family mentioned in the Old Testament. Its exact identification is unclear, but in the modern day it is generally translated as "harp" or "lyre", and associated with a type of lyre depicted in Israelite imagery, particularly the Bar Kochba coins. It has been referred to as the "national instrument" of the Jewish people, and modern luthiers have created reproduction lyres of the "kinnor" based on this imagery.

==== Giant lyres ====
Giant lyres are a type of flat-based eastern lyre of immense size that typically required two players. Played from a standing position, the instrument stood taller than the instrumentalists. The oldest extent example of the instrument was found in the ancient city of Uruk in what is present day Iraq, and dates to c. 2500 BCE. Well preserved giant lyres dating to c. 1600 BCE have been found in Anatolia. The instrument reached the height of its popularity in Ancient Egypt during the reign of Pharaoh Akhenaten (c. 1353—1336 BCE). A giant lyre found in the ancient city of Susa (c. 2500 BCE) is suspected to have been played by only a single instrumentalist, and giant lyres in Egypt dating from the Hellenistic period most likely also required only a single player.

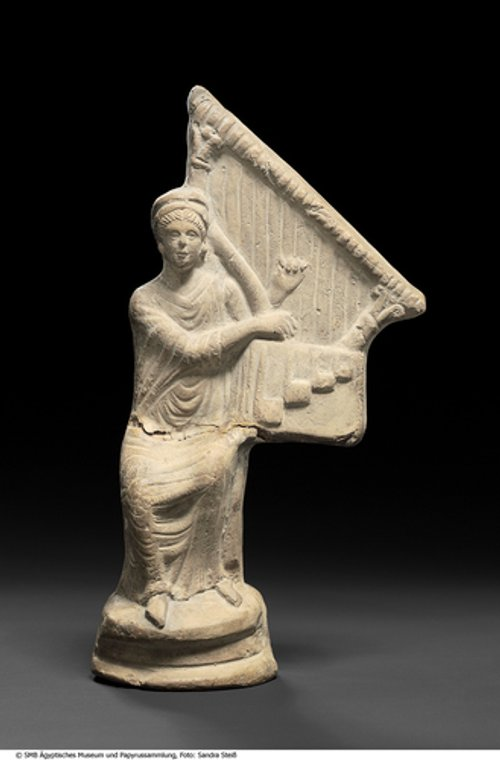
Terracotta figurine of a woman with a lyre, Egypt, 4th century A.D.

=== Western lyres ===
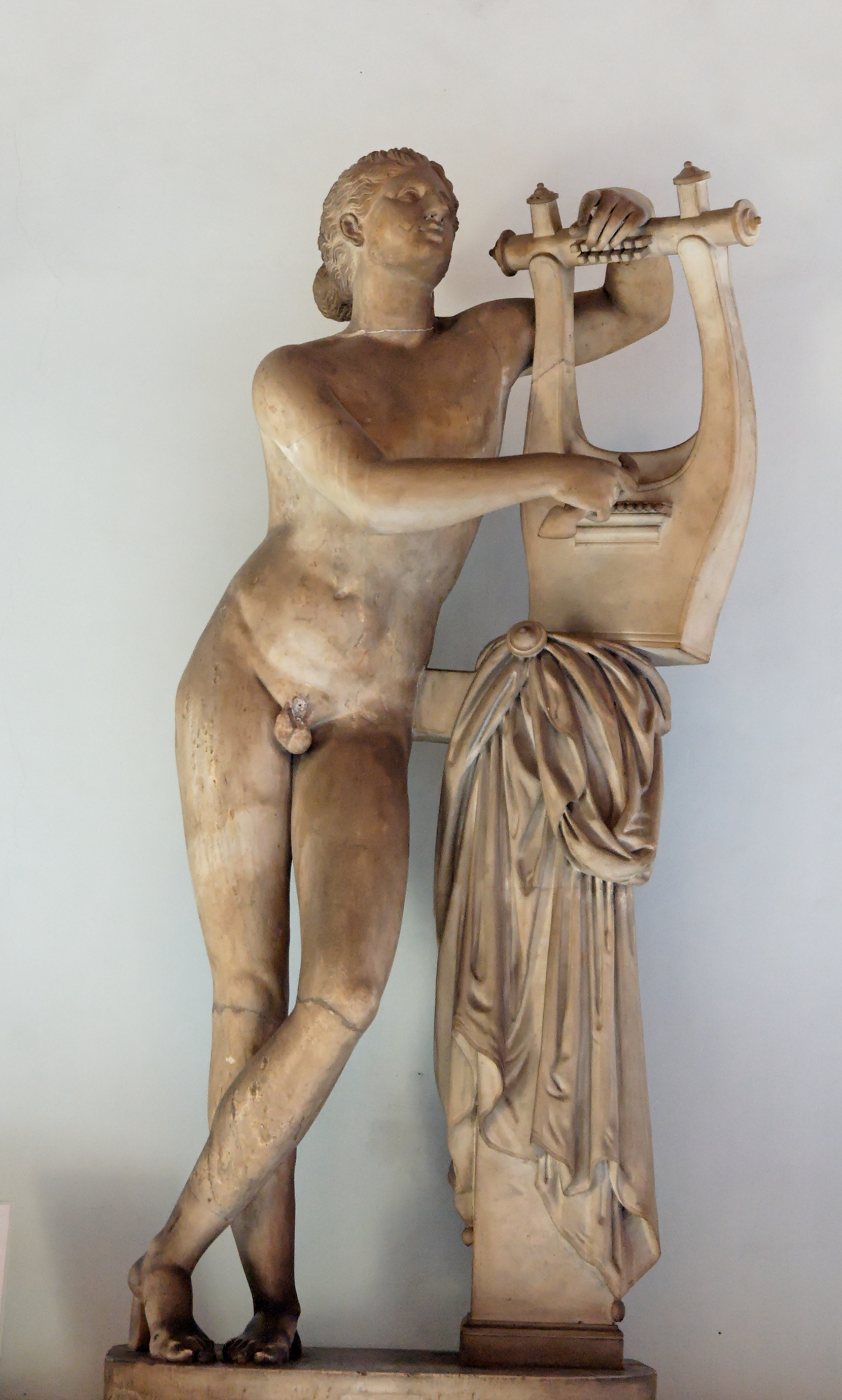
Pothos (Desire) holding a flat-based kithara. The deity in the artwork was restored as Apollo Citharoedus during the Roman era (1st or 2nd century CE, based on a Greek work c. 300 BCE); the kithara strings are not extant.

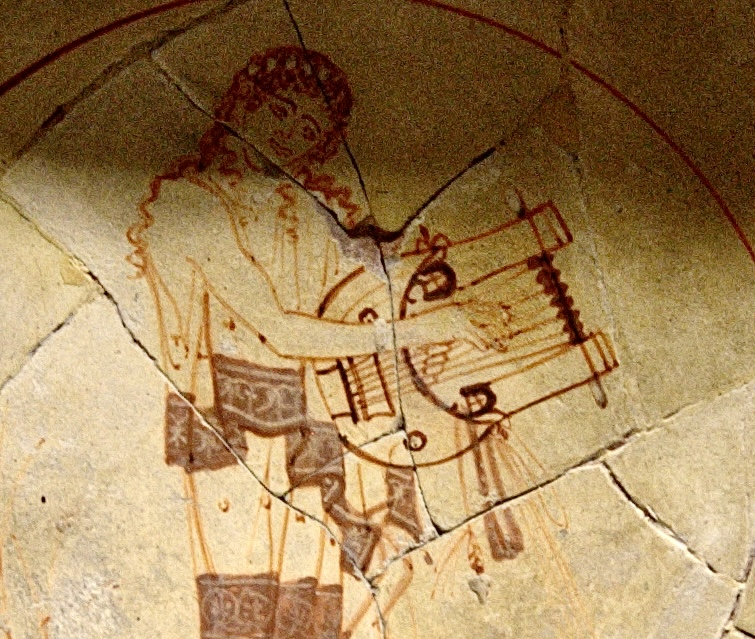
Phorminx player, 470-460 BCE,; round-based lyre. Detail of work by the Hesiod Painter.

Western lyres, sometimes referred to as round-based lyres, are lyres from the ancient history that were extant in the Aegean, mainland Greece, and southern Italy. They initially contained only round rather than flat bases; but by the Hellenistic period both constructs of lyre could be found in these regions. Like the flat-based Eastern lyres, the round-based lyre also originated in northern Syria and southern Anatolia in the 3rd millennium BCE. However, this round-based construction of the lyre was less common than its flat-based counterparts in the east, and by c. 1750 BCE the instrument had died out completely in this region. The round-based lyre re-appeared in the West in Ancient Greece where it was sole form of lyre used between 1400 and 700 BCE.

Like the eastern flat-based lyre, the western round-based lyre also had several sub-types. Homer described two different western lyres in his writings, the phorminx and kitharis. However, both of these terms have not had uniform meaning across time, and their use during Homer's time was later altered. Today, scholars divide instruments referred to as kitharis into two subgroups, the round-based cylinder kithara and the flat-based concert kithara.

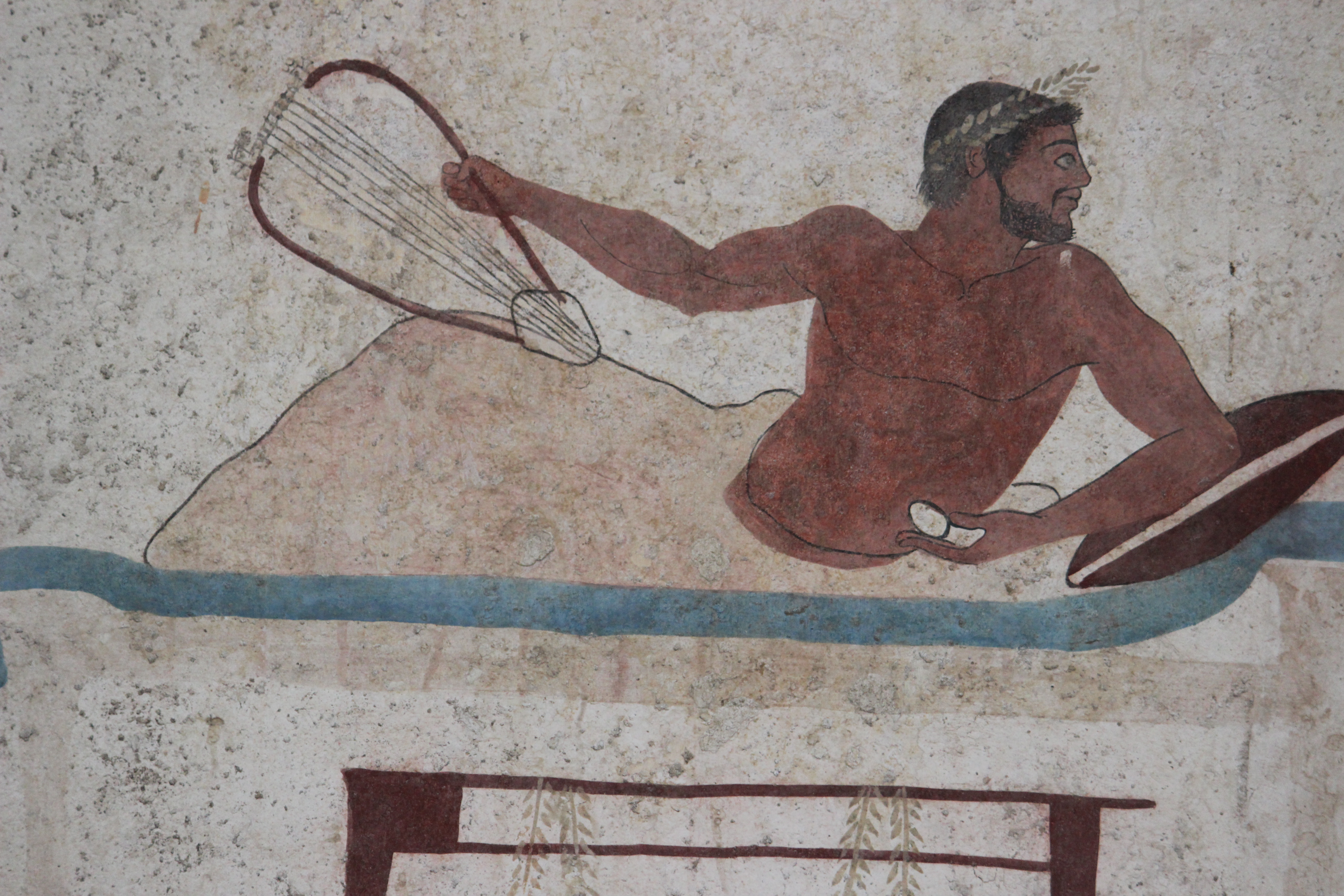
5th century BCE. Lyra or barbitos from the Tomb of the Diver.

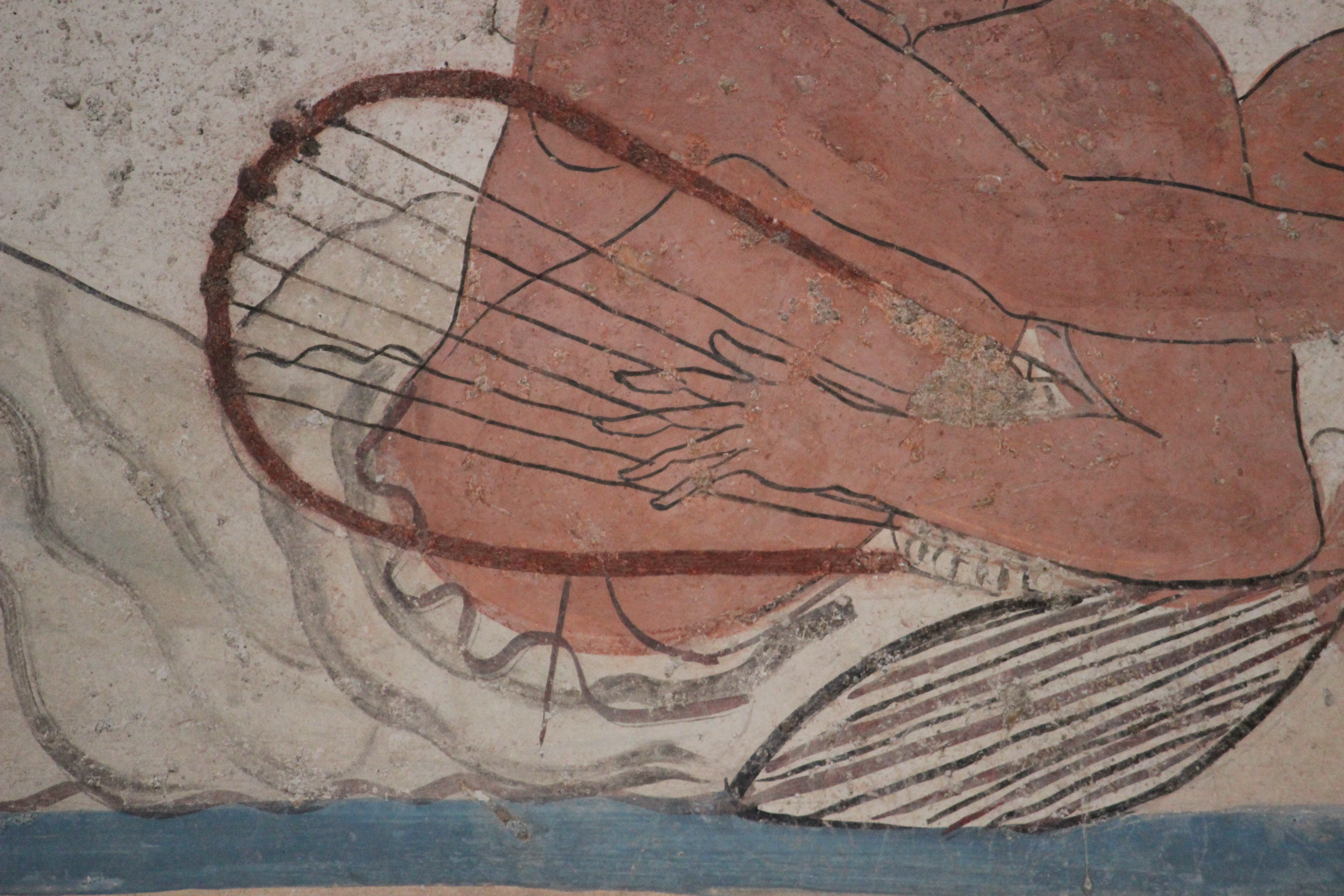
5th century BCE. Lyra or barbitos from the Tomb of the Diver. Tortoiseshell body.

== Cultural use in Ancient Greece ==
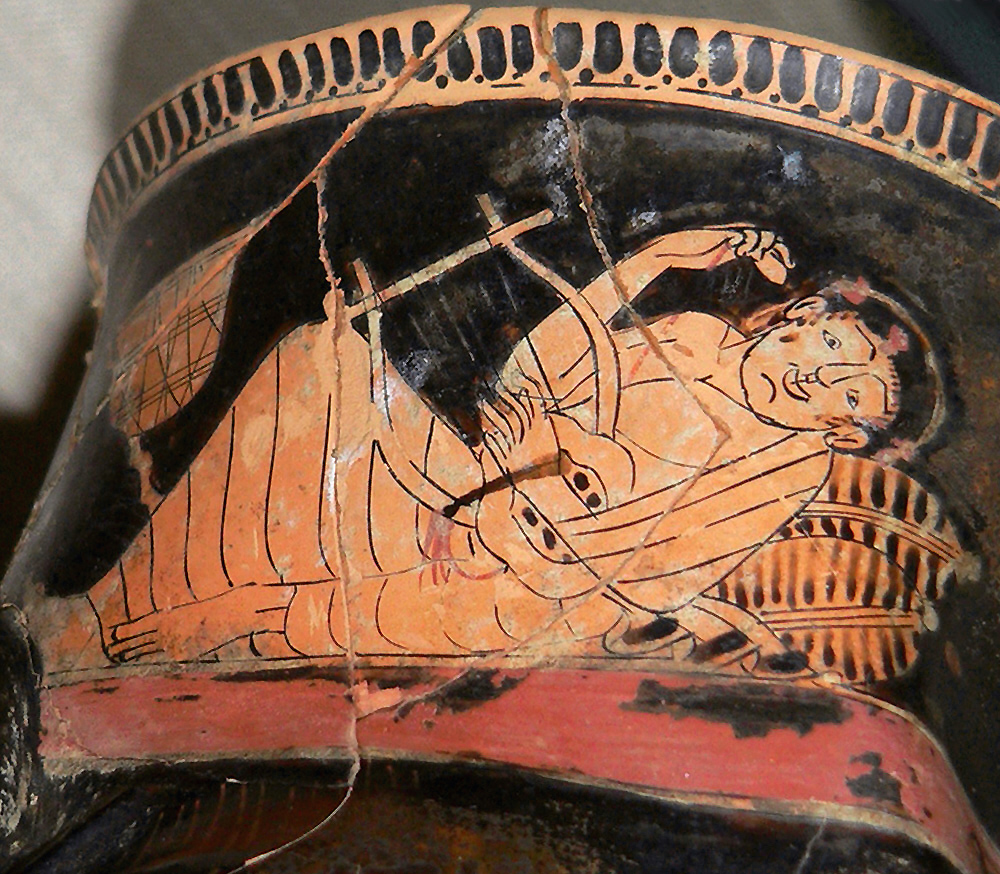
Lyre with tortoiseshell body (rhyton, c. 475 BC). Shows strap that stabilizes instrument. Musician holds a plectrum in his other hand.

In Ancient Greece, recitations of lyric poetry were accompanied by lyre playing. The earliest picture of a Greek lyre appears in the famous sarcophagus of Hagia Triada (a Minoan settlement in Crete). The sarcophagus was used during the Mycenaean occupation of Crete (c. 1400 BCE).

The lyre of classical antiquity was ordinarily played by being strummed like a guitar or a zither, rather than being plucked with the fingers as with a harp. A pick called a plectrum was held in one hand, while the fingers of the free hand silenced the unwanted strings.

=== Construction ===
A classical lyre has a hollow body or sound-chest (also known as soundbox or resonator), which in Greek tradition was anciently made out of a turtle shell. Extending from this sound-chest are two raised arms, which are sometimes hollow, and are curved both outward and forward. They are connected near the top by a crossbar or yoke. An additional crossbar, fixed to the sound-chest, makes the bridge, which transmits the vibrations of the strings. The deepest note was that closest to the player's body; since the strings did not differ much in length, more weight may have been gained for the deeper notes by thicker strings, as in the violin and similar modern instruments, or they were tuned by having a slacker tension. The strings were of gut (animal intestines). They were stretched between the yoke and bridge, or to a tailpiece below the bridge. There were two ways of tuning: One was to fasten the strings to pegs that might be turned, while the other was to change the placement of the string on the crossbar; it is likely that, as expedient, both methods were used simultaneously.

Lyres were used without a fingerboard, no Greek description or representation having ever been met with that can be construed as referring to one. Nor was a bow possible, the flat sound-board being an insuperable impediment. The pick, or plectrum, however, was in constant use. It was held in the right hand to set the upper strings in vibration; when not in use, it hung from the instrument by a ribbon. The fingers of the left hand touched the lower strings (presumably to silence those whose notes were not wanted).

=== Number of strings ===
Before Greek civilization had assumed its historic form (c. 1200 BCE), there was likely to have been great freedom and independence of different localities in the matter of lyre stringing, which is corroborated by the antique use of the chromatic (half-tone) and enharmonic (quarter-tone) tunings - pointing to an early exuberance, and perhaps also to a bias towards refinements of intonation. The number of strings on the classical lyre therefore varied, with three, four, six, seven, eight and ten having been popular at various times.

The priest and biographer Plutarch (c. 100 CE) wrote of the musicians of the archaic period Olympus and Terpander, that they used only three strings to accompany their recitation; but there is no evidence for or against this dating from that period. The earliest known lyre had four strings, tuned to create a tetrachord or series of four tones filling in the interval of a perfect fourth. By doubling the tetrachord a lyre with seven or eight strings was obtained. Likewise the three-stringed lyre may have given rise to the six-stringed lyre depicted on many archaic Greek vases. The accuracy of this representation cannot be insisted upon, the vase painters being little mindful of the complete expression of details; yet one may suppose their tendency would be rather to imitate than to invent a number. It was their constant practice to represent the strings as being damped by the fingers of the left hand of the player, after having been struck by the plectrum held in the right hand.

=== Origin ===
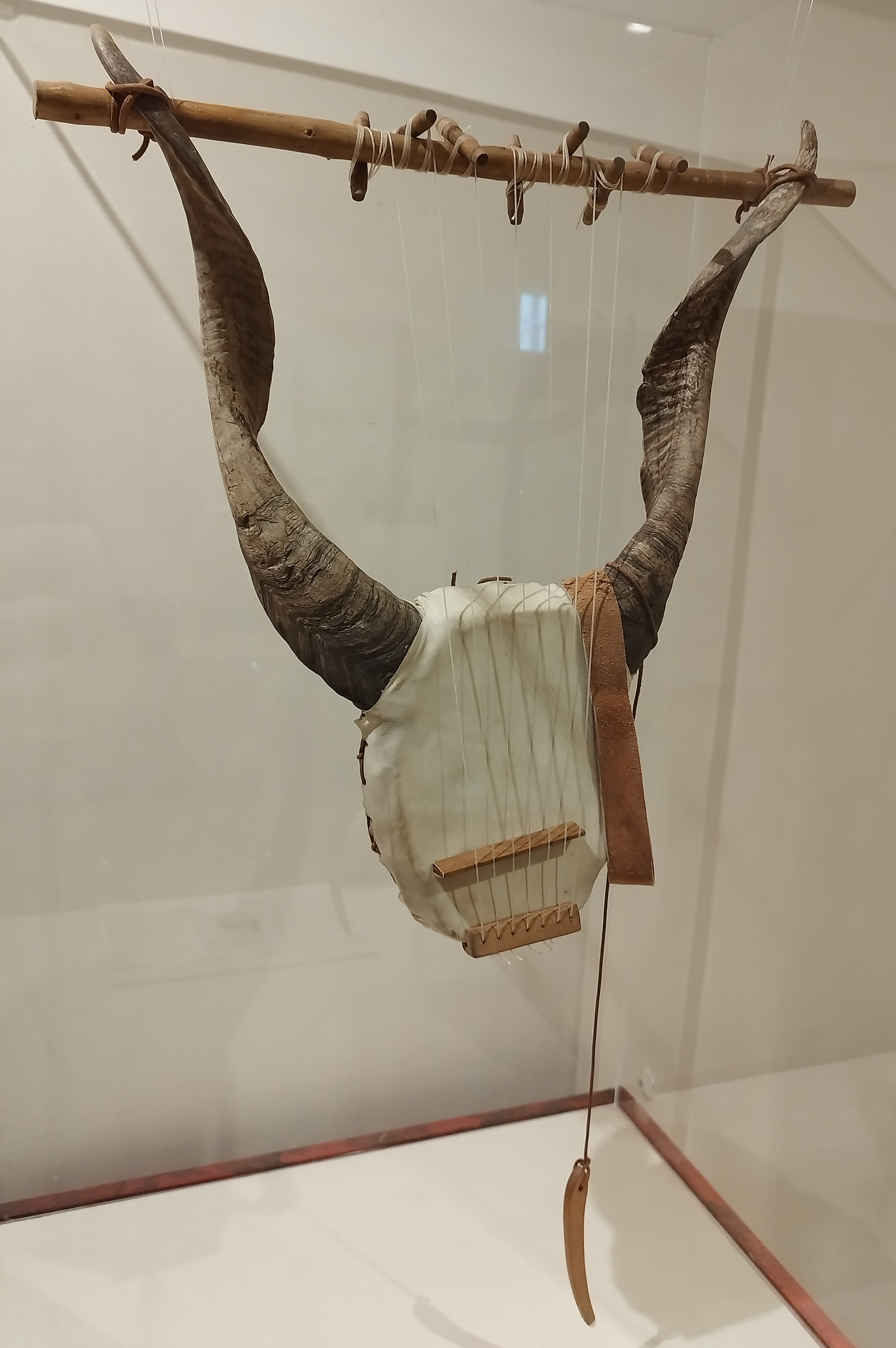
A modern reconstruction of Hermes' lyre by Kotsanas Museum of Ancient Greek Technology, in Athens, Greece.

According to ancient Greek mythology, the young god Hermes stole a herd of sacred cows from Apollo. In order not to be followed, he made shoes for the cows which were facing backwards, making it appear that the animals had walked in the opposite direction. Apollo, following the trails, could not follow where the cows were going. Along the way, Hermes slaughtered one of the cows and offered all but the entrails to the gods. From the entrails and a tortoise/turtle shell, he created the Lyre. Apollo, figuring out it was Hermes who had his cows, confronted the young god. Apollo was furious, but after hearing the sound of the lyre, his anger faded. Apollo offered to trade the herd of cattle for the lyre. Hence, the creation of the lyre is attributed to Hermes. Other sources credit it to Apollo himself.

Some of the cultures using and developing the lyre were the Aeolian and Ionian Greek colonies on the coasts of Asia (ancient Asia Minor, modern day Turkey) bordering the Lydian empire. Some mythic masters like Musaeus, and Thamyris were believed to have been born in Thrace, another place of extensive Greek colonization. The name kissar (cithara) given by the ancient Greeks to Egyptian box instruments reveals the apparent similarities recognized by Greeks themselves. The cultural peak of ancient Egypt, and thus the possible age of the earliest instruments of this type, predates the 5th century classic Greece. This indicates the possibility that the lyre might have existed in one of Greece's neighboring countries, either Thrace, Lydia, or Egypt, and was introduced into Greece at pre-classic times.

== Central and Northern European lyres ==
See Rotte (lyre)

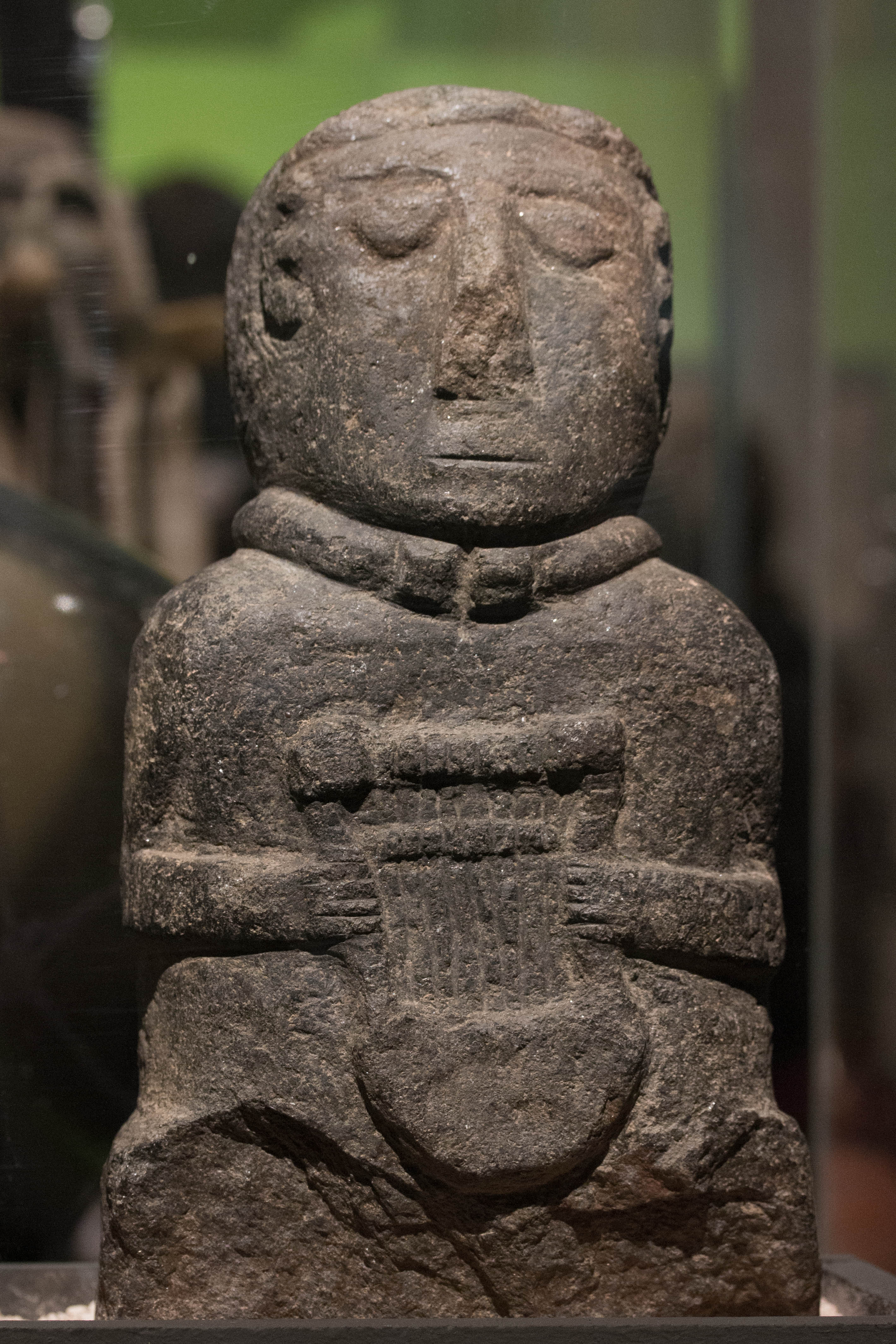
2nd or 1st century BCE buste-socle found in the fortress of Paule, in Brittany

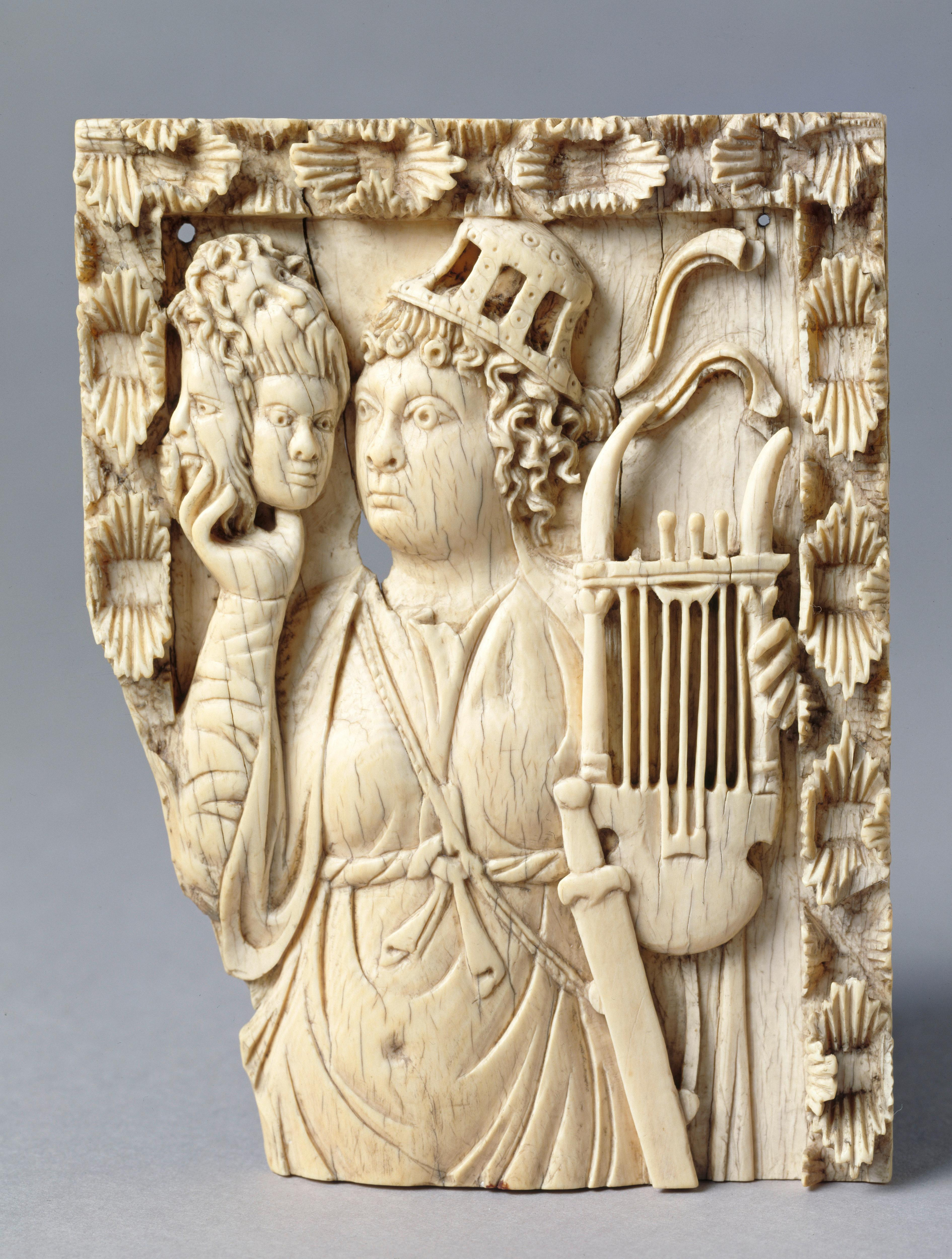
Example of lyre (early 6th century A.D.) in Roman city of Trier at the time when the Germanic Franks took over the city (mid-5th century A.D.)

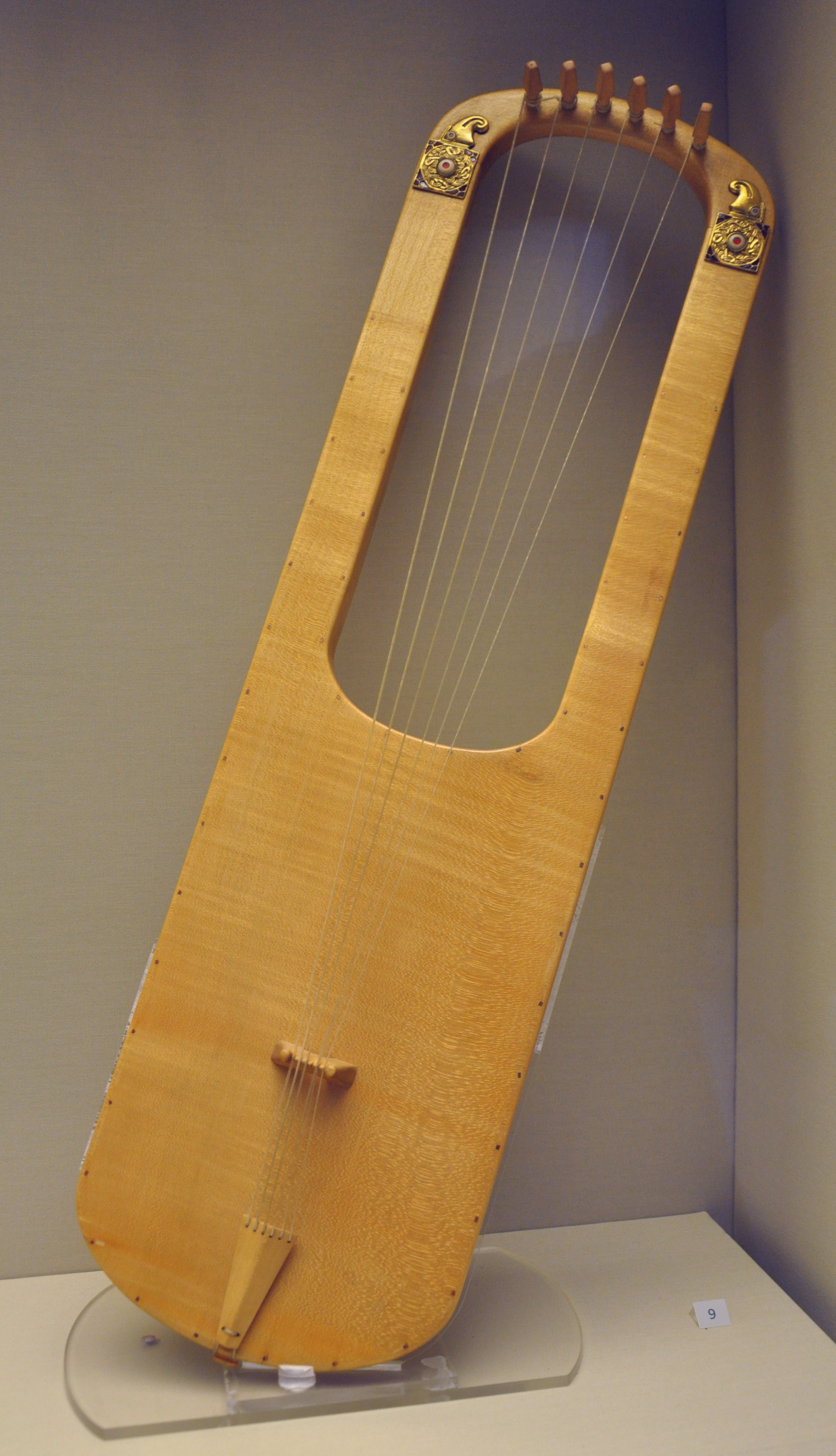
Reproduction of the round Germanic-lyre from the Sutton Hoo royal burial (England), c. 600 CE

Other instruments known as lyres have been fashioned and used in Europe outside the Greco-Roman world since at least the Iron Age. Lyres are depicted on ceramic and bronze vessels of the Proto-Celtic Hallstatt culture across central Europe. Among them there are lyres with rounded bottoms, stringed instruments whose resonators seem to be missing and lyres with strongly curved yokes and single or double bulging resonators. The number of strings depicted varies from two to ten. Fragmented tuning pegs and bridges made of wood have been discovered from the Iron Age industrial settlement in the Ramsau valley at Dürrnberg, Austria. Possible further wooden tuning pegs have been found in Glastonbury in Somerset in England and Biskupin in Poland. The remains of what is thought to be the bridge of a 2300-year-old lyre were discovered on the Isle of Skye, Scotland in 2010.

In 1988, a stone bust from the 2nd or 1st century BCE was discovered in Brittany, France which depicts a figure wearing a torc playing a seven-string lyre.

The Germanic lyre is representative of a separate strand of lyre development. Appearing in warrior graves of the first millennium CE, these lyres differ from the lyres of the Mediterranean antiquity, by a long, shallow and broadly rectangular shape, with a hollow soundbox curving at the base, and two hollow arms connected across the top by an integrated crossbar or 'yoke. Famous examples include the lyre from the ship burial at Sutton Hoo, and the decayed lyre discovered in silhouette at the Prittlewell royal Anglo-Saxon burial in Essex. The waterlogged lyre recovered from a grave at Trossingen, Germany, in 2001 is the best-preserved example found so far.

== Bowed lyres ==
Some instruments called "lyres" were played with a bow in Europe and parts of the Middle East, namely the Arabic rebab and its descendants, including the Byzantine lyra.

After the bow made its way into Europe from the Middle-East, it was applied to several species of those lyres that were small enough to make bowing practical. The dates of origin and other evolutionary details of the European bowed lyres continue to be disputed among organologists, but there is general agreement that none of them were the ancestors of modern orchestral bowed stringed instruments, as once was thought.

There came to be two different kinds of bowed European lyres: those with fingerboards, and those without.

The last surviving examples of instruments within the latter class were the Scandinavian talharpa and the Finnish jouhikko. Different tones could be obtained from a single bowed string by pressing the fingernails of the player's left hand against various points along the string to fret the string.

The last of the bowed lyres with a fingerboard was the "modern" (c. 1485–1800) Welsh crwth. It had several predecessors both in the British Isles and in Continental Europe. Pitch was changed on individual strings by pressing the string firmly against the fingerboard with the fingertips. Like a violin, this method shortened the vibrating length of the string to produce higher tones, while releasing the finger gave the string a greater vibrating length, thereby producing a tone lower in pitch. This is the principle on which the modern violin and guitar work.

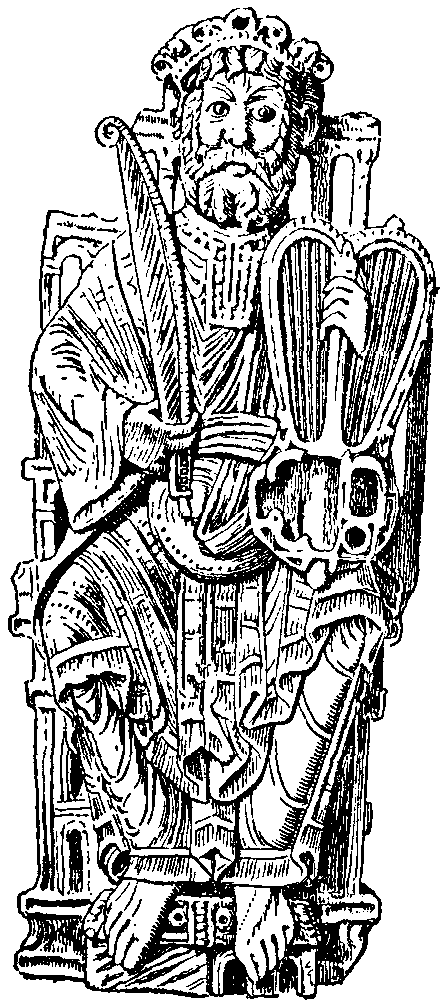
12th century A.D. Carolingian Empire. Bowed round lyre on the Lothair Psalter. Engraving lacks fine details in the original, such as the mechanism to adjust the tension of the bow.

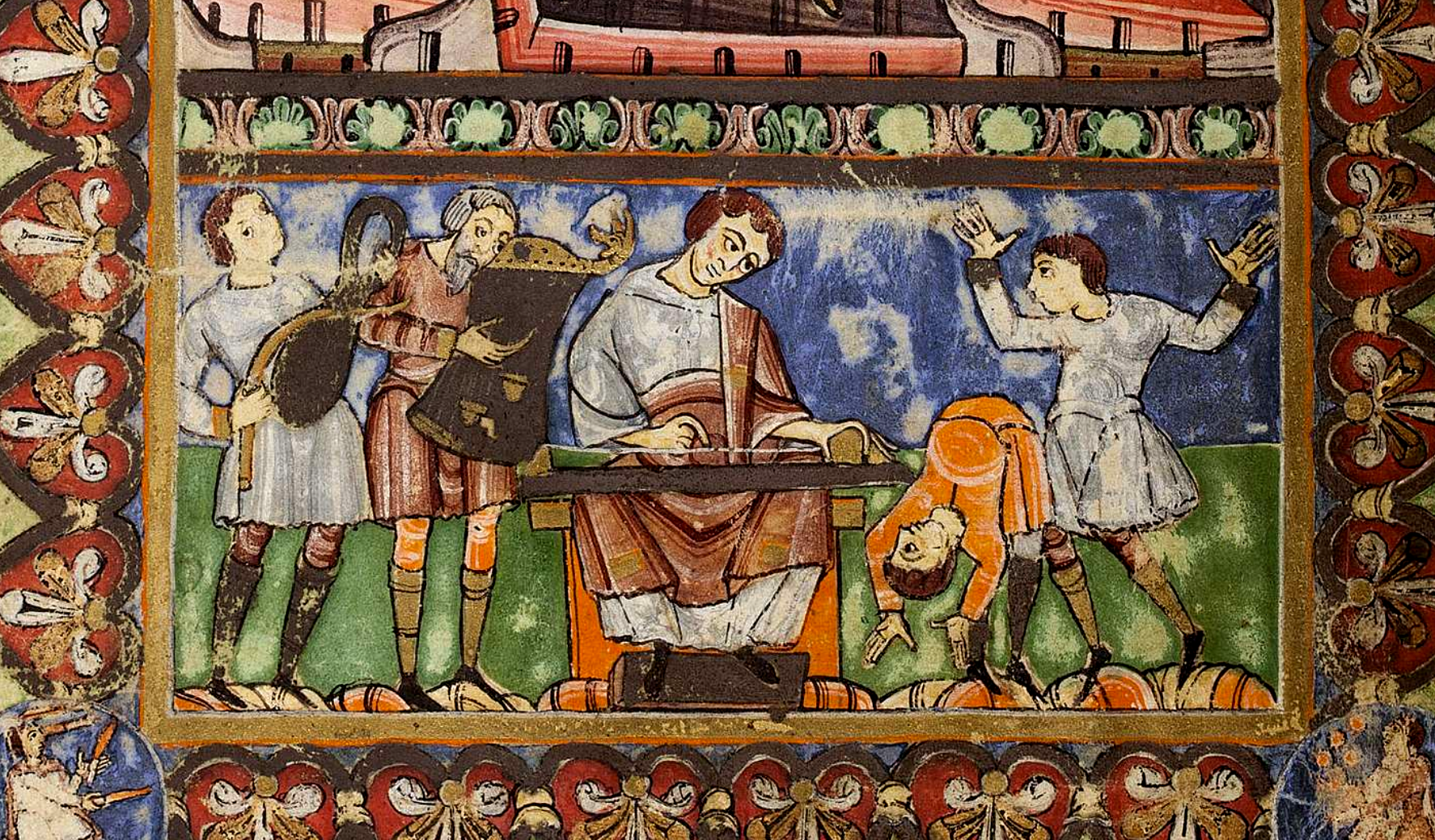
1029-1050 A.D., Germany. Werner Psalter. Bowed Germanic lure (far left)

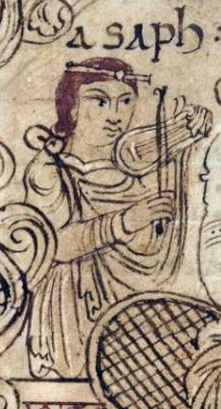
1025-1050, England. Asaph playing bowed lyre, detail from Winchcombe Psalter, Cambridge University Library, Ff.1.23, folio 4v

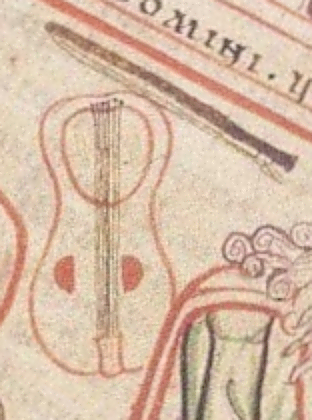
Early 13th century A.D., Aldersbach, Germany. Bowed lyre without fingerboard from, Bayerische Staatsbibliothek Munchen, BSB, CLM 2599, folio 96v.

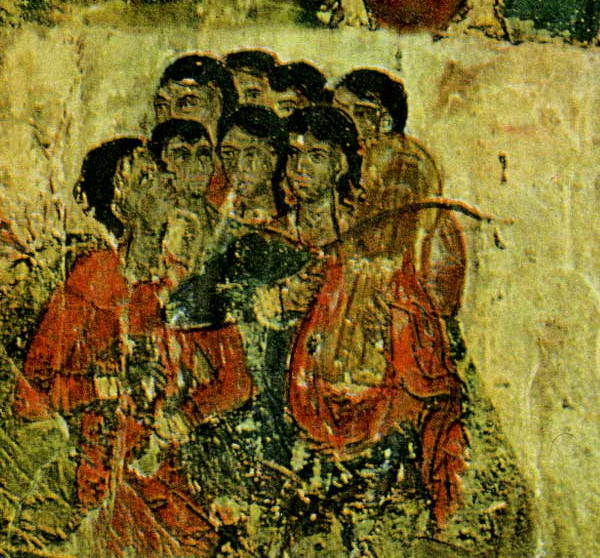
13th century, Russia. Bowed lyre, from Simonovskaya Psalter, State Historical Museum, Moscow

== Modern lyres ==
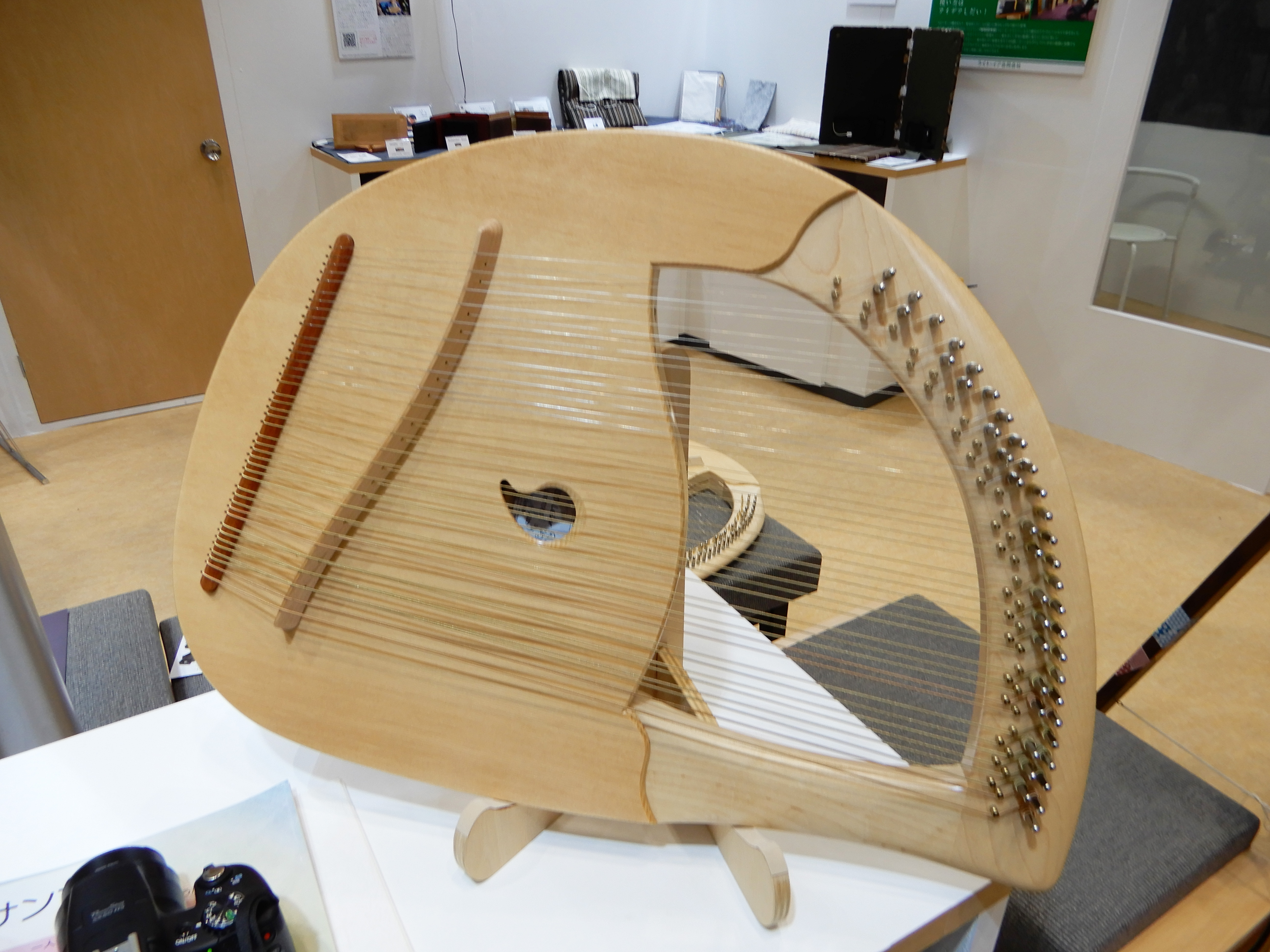
Gärtner lyre; this modern lyre was created by Edmund Pracht and W. Lothar Gärtner in 1926.

== In popular culture ==
The term is also used metaphorically to refer to the work or skill of a poet, as in Shelley's "Make me thy lyre, even as the forest is" or Byron's "I wish to tune my quivering lyre, / To deeds of fame, and notes of fire".

== Other instruments called "lyres" ==
Over time, the name in the wider Hellenic space came to be used to label mostly bowed lutes such as the Byzantine lyra, the Pontic lyra, the Constantinopolitan lyra, the Cretan lyra, the lira da braccio, the Calabrian lira, the lijerica, the lyra viol, the lirone.

== Global variants and parallels ==
Europe

- Armenia: քնար (knar)
- British Isles: Scotland cruit, The Shetland Isles gue and Wales crwth
- England: Anglo-Saxon Lyre, giga, rote or crowd
- Continental Europe: Germanic or Anglo-Saxon lyre (hearpe), rotte or crotte
- Estonia: talharpa
- Finland: jouhikko
- Greece: λύρα (lýra; Modern Greek pronunciation: líra) with the subtypes of Politiki lyra ("Constantinopolitan lyre"), Cretan lyra and Pontic lyra ("lyre of the Black Sea", also known as kemençe)
- Italy: the Latin chorus, the modern Calabrian lira
- Lithuania: lyra
- Norway: giga, Kraviklyra
- Poland: lira
- Russia: Lyre-shaped gusli

Asia

- Arabian peninsula: tanbūra
- Iran: chang romi
- Iraq (Sumer): tanbūra, zami, zinar
- Israel: kinnor
- India and Pakistan: tanpura
- Kazakhstan: kossaz
- Siberia: nares-jux
- Yemen: tanbūra, simsimiyya

Africa

- Egypt: kissar, tanbūra, simsimiyya
- Ethiopia and Eritrea: begena, dita, krar
- Kenya: kibugander, litungu, nyatiti, obokano
- Sudan: kissar, tanbūra
- Uganda: endongo, ntongoli
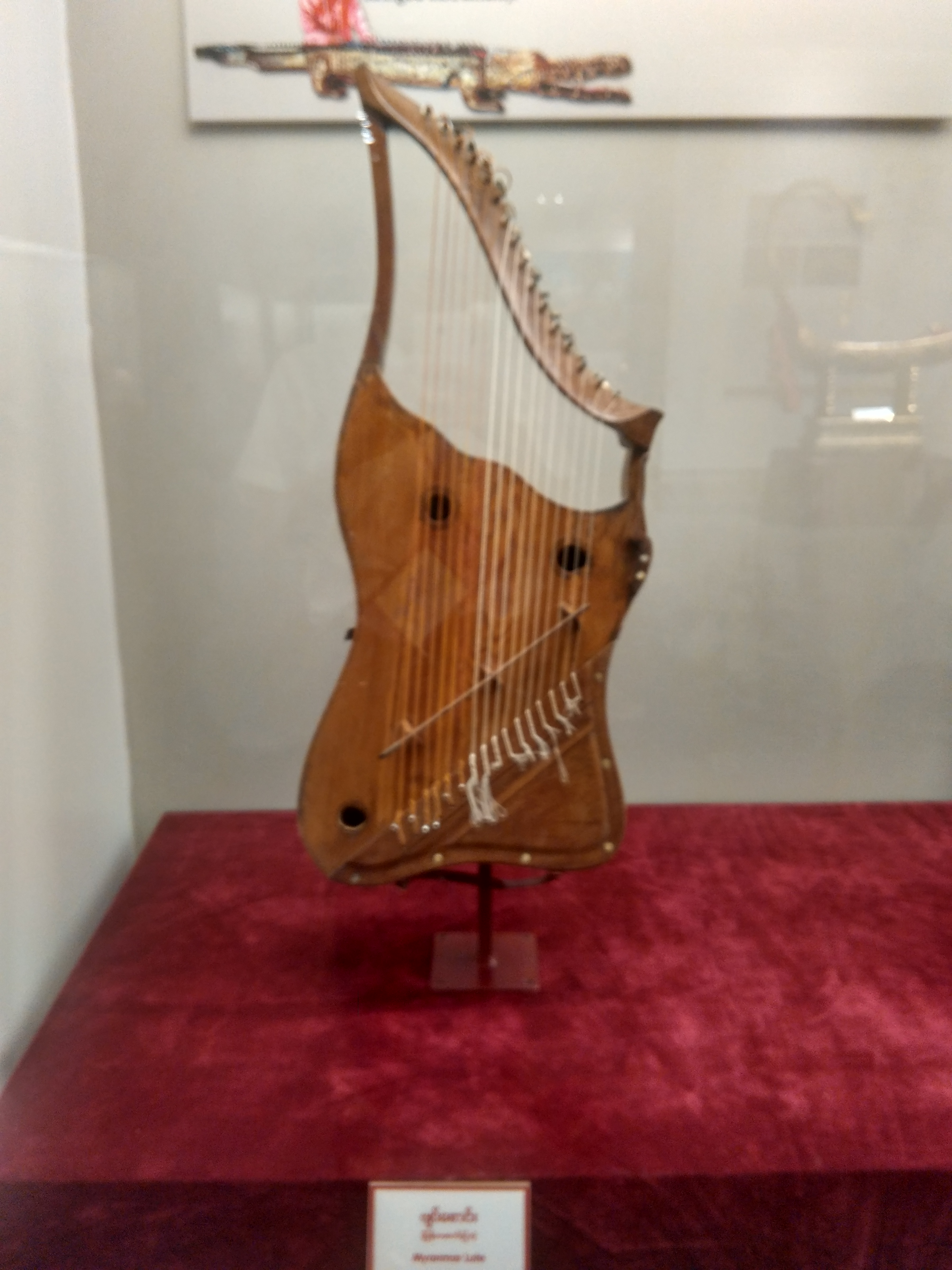
Burmese lyre, a Byat saung.

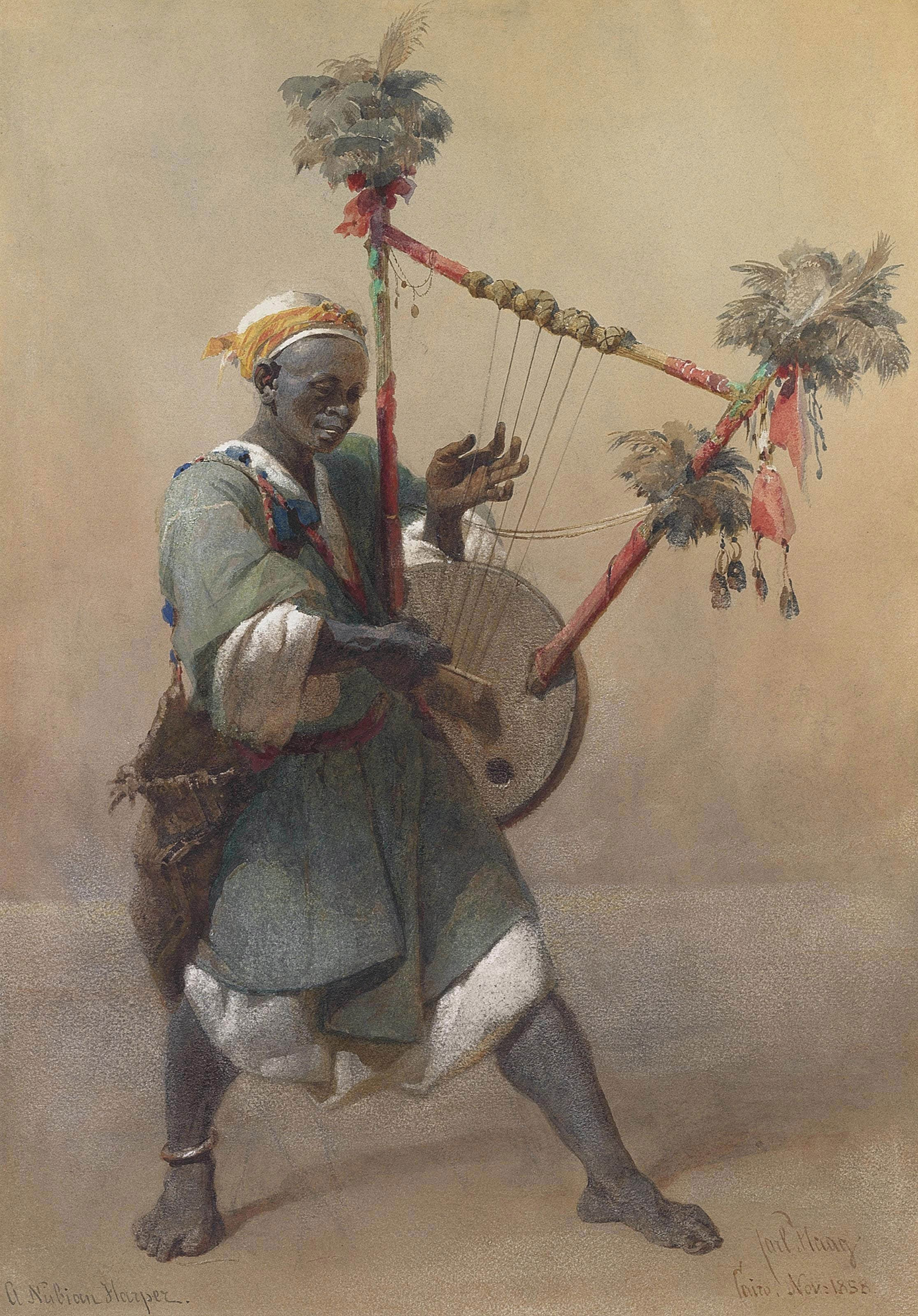
Tanbūra In Cairo, played by a Nubian, 1858.

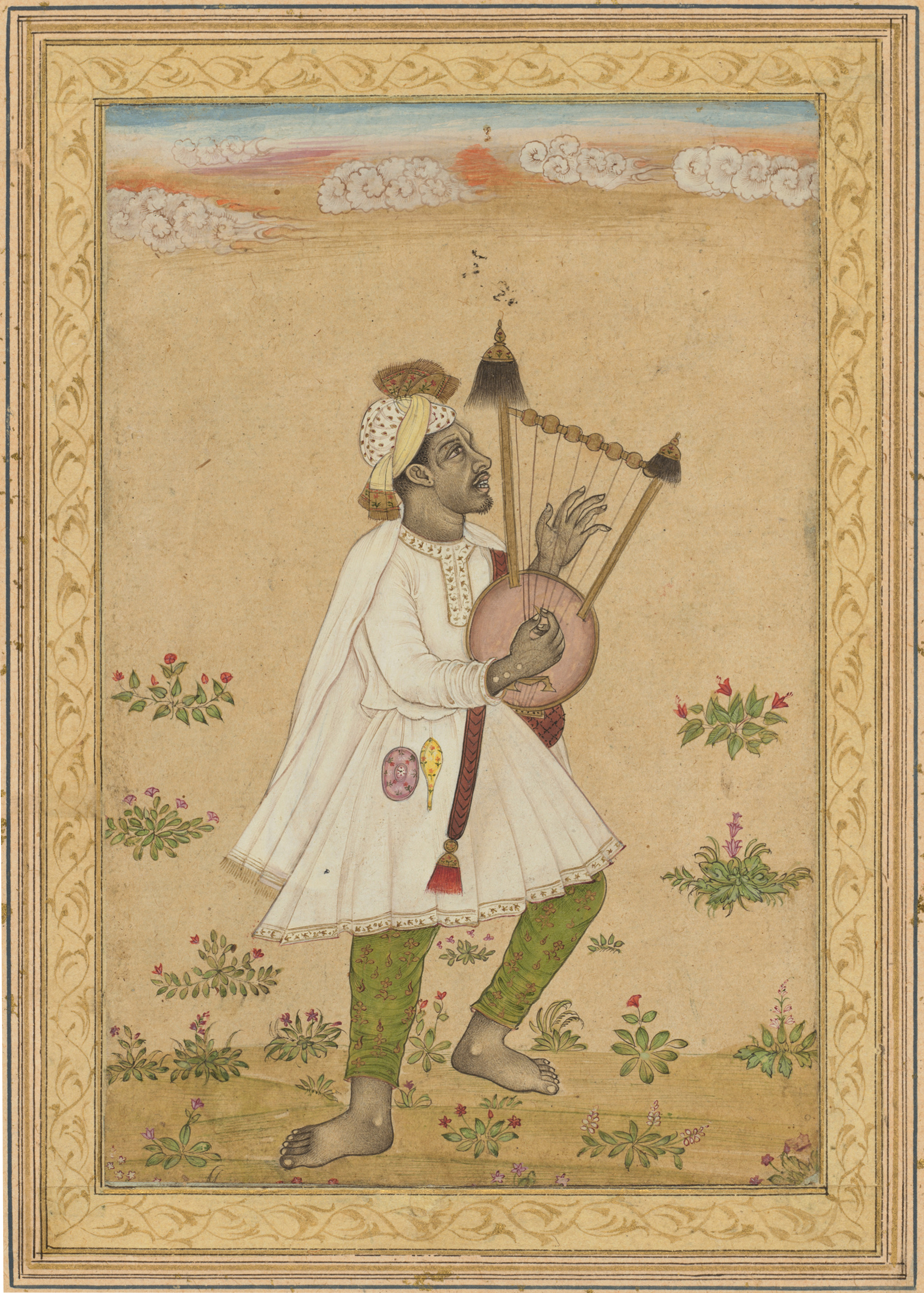
Lyre Player c. 1640–1660, Deccan sultanates

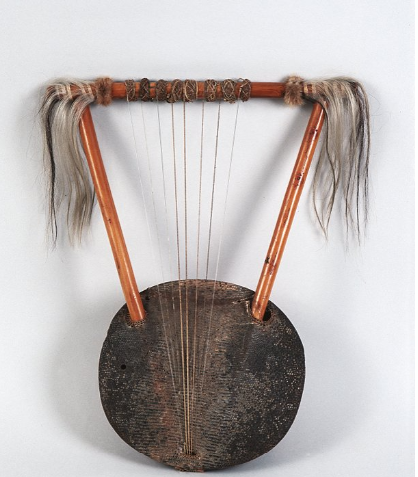
Picture of a 1960s Ntongoli (Bowl Lyre) from St. Cecilia's Hall, Edinburgh

== See also ==
- Asor — an otherwise-unknown instrument mentioned in the Old Testament which may have been a type of lyre or a type of harp.
- Ancient Greek harps
- Barbiton (barbitos) — a bass version of the kithara (cithara).
- Kithara (cithara) — the version of the lyre used by professional musicians.
- Lyre-guitar — a modern instrument that combines a guitar and a zither. Also called a "harp guitar".
- Phorminx — an ancient wooden-frame lyre intermediate in size between the smaller tortoise-shell lyre and larger kithara, which replaced it.

== Bibliography ==
- Andersson, Otto. The Bowed Harp, translated and edited by Kathleen Schlesinger (London: New Temple Press, 1930).
- Bachmann, Werner. The Origins of Bowing, trans. Norma Deane (London: Oxford University Press, 1969).
- Jenkins, J. "A Short Note on African Lyres in Use Today." Iraq 31 (1969), p. 103 (+ pl. XVIII).
- Kinsky, George. A History of Music in Pictures (New York: E.P. Dutton, 1937).
- Sachs, Curt. The Rise of Music in the Ancient World, East and West (New York: W.W. Norton, 1943).
- Sachs, Curt. The History of Musical Instruments (New York: W.W. Norton, 1940).
