= List of musical instruments by Hornbostel–Sachs number: 321.21 =

This is a list of instruments by Hornbostel-Sachs number, covering those instruments that are classified under 321.21 under that system. These instruments may be known as bowl lyres.

3: Instruments in which sound is produced by one or more vibrating strings (chordophones, string instruments).

32: Instruments in which the resonator and string bearer are physically united and can not be separated without destroying the instrument

321: Instruments in which the strings run in a plane parallel to the sound table (lutes)

321.2: Instruments in which the string is attached to a yoke that consists of a cross-bar and two arms, with the yoke lying in the same plane as the sound-table (lyres or yoke lutes)

321.21: Instruments in which the resonator is bowl-shaped, either carved or natural

These instruments may be classified with a suffix, based on how the strings are caused to vibrate.

- 4: Hammers or beaters
- 5: Bare hands and fingers
- 6: Plectrum
- 7: Bowing
  - 71: Using a bow
  - 72: Using a wheel
  - 73: Using a ribbon
- 8: Keyboard
- 9: Using a mechanical drive

== List ==
Instrument	Tradition	Hornbostel–Sachs classification	Description
endongo	Baganda peoples of Uganda	321.21	Bowl lyre made of lizardskin with strings tied to a piece of wood inserted into two holes on two arms
lyre	Greece, Ancient	321.21-5	Stringed instrument, strummed with a plectrum, with the free hand silencing unwanted strings, traditionally made from a tortoise shell
nyatiti	Kenya	321.21-5	3-foot-long (0.91 m) harp, plucked with both hands, made of wood and goat or antelope skin
