= Lesiba =

Class of unbraced mouth-resonated musical bows

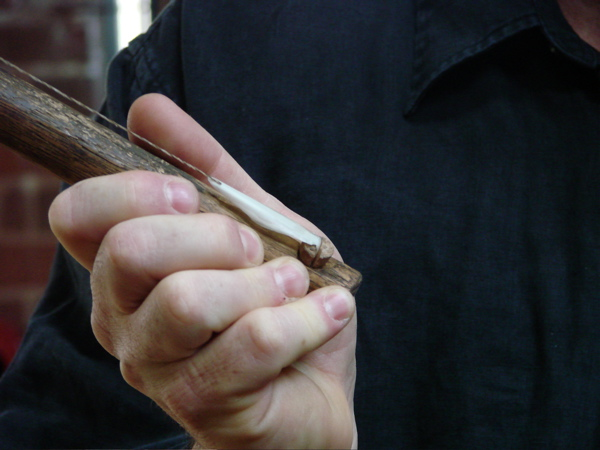
- A close up of the quill portion of a lesiba

String instrument
- Classification: Stringed-wind instrument
- Hornbostel–Sachs classification: 311.121.222 (Single-stringed heterochord musical bow)

Related instruments
- goura

Musicians
- Ntate Thabong Phosa

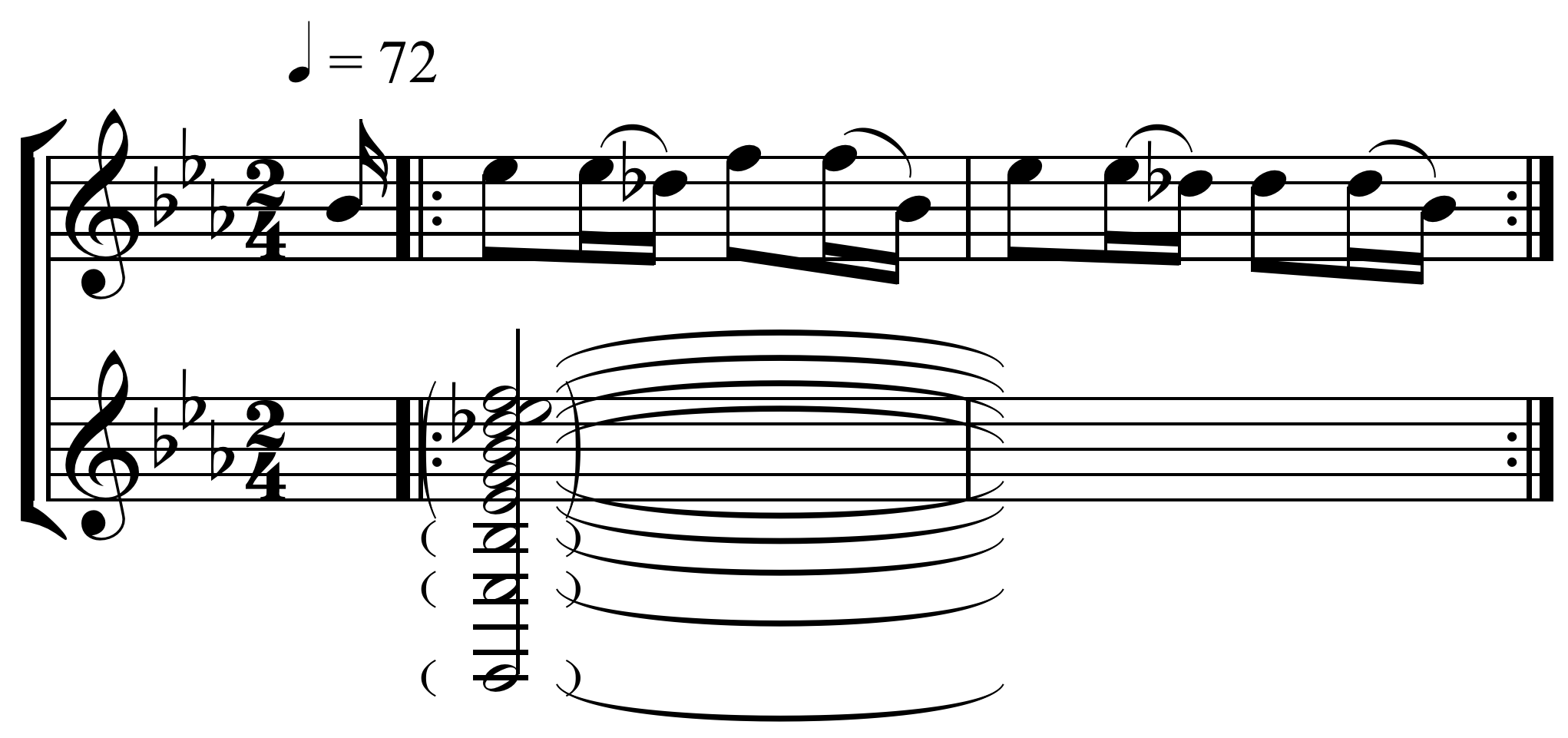
Melody produced without grunts, notes often shaded by the harmonic series (D♭ is the harmonic seventh)

The term lesiba (Tswana for 'feather') refers to a class of "unbraced mouth-resonated bow[s]" with a flattened quill attached to a long string, stretched over a hard stick, acting as the main source of vibration. Holding both hands around the quill, positioned without touching just inside the lips, the player sharply inhales or exhales against it, creating vibration in the string. This "produces a powerful buzzing sound," usually in short notes on a small, limited scale.

Inhalation excites the harmonics of the string, while exhalation is most often accompanied by a throaty grunt, except in players with strong breath, and may be accompanied by humming. Vocalizations create, from a single player, the effect of more than one part. The harmonics used are primarily the fifth, sixth, seventh, eighth, ninth, tenth, and twelfth. The lesiba's construction is unique: "no other class of stringed-wind instrument has been found anywhere else in the world."

According to Barrow in 1806, the instrument sounds "like the faint murmurs of distant music that 'comes o'er the ear' without any distinction of notes." Barnard in 1910 noted the loudness of the instrument, while Alberti in 1810 compared the sounds to the "tones of the so-called Hunting-horn," presumably a reference to the shared use of the harmonic series. According to Kirby in 1934, "the tone is, when well produced, very pleasant, partaking of the qualities of both string and wind, reminding one of the Aeolian harp; and it can be varied in power from a faint whisper to a strong, vibrant sound, the air column of the mouth and throat acting as a resonator."

Though very few people alive today play this instrument, the "harsh, bird-like sounds" the instrument produces are so well recognised among the Sotho that it is used on Lesotho Radio to signal the start of the news broadcast. The lesiba is the national instrument of the Basotho, a southern African people, now located primarily in South Africa and Lesotho, and the Khoikhoi people of South Africa. The lesiba is played mostly by herdsmen and herdboys to give signals and instructions to their cattle, and, almost as much, for their own entertainment.

Whenever they [a herd] hear him [a herdsman] play [they easily recognize his mode of playing and distinguish him from other performers], they exhibit their appreciation of the music by clustering and huddling around him.

As such, studies of the instrument may be classified as zoomusicology, and passages on the instrument are metaphorically compared to various linong (Sotho for 'vultures').

One player, Ntate Thabong Phosa, plays with Sipho Mabuse and can be heard in the song "Thaba Bosiu" on Mabuse's Township Child album.

== See also ==
- Korhaan
