= List of musical instruments by Hornbostel–Sachs number: 322.211 =

This is a list of instruments by Hornbostel-Sachs number, covering those instruments that are classified under 322.211 under that system. These instruments are diatonic frame harps.

3: Instruments in which sound is produced by one or more vibrating strings (chordophones, string instruments).

32: Instruments in which the resonator and string bearer are physically united and can not be separated without destroying the instrument

322: Instrument whose strings are at right angles to the sound table, such that a line between the lower tips of the strings would point at the neck (harps)

322.2: Instrument has a pillar (frame harps)

322.21: Instrument has no tuning action

322.211: Instrument is diatonic

These instruments may be classified with a suffix, based on how the strings are caused to vibrate.

- 4: Hammers or beaters
- 5: Bare hands and fingers
- 6: Plectrum
- 7: Bowing
  - 71: Using a bow
  - 72: Using a wheel
  - 73: Using a ribbon
- 8: Keyboard
- 9: Using a mechanical drive

== List ==
Instrument	Tradition	Hornbostel–Sachs classification	Description
harp, Paraguayan	Paraguay	322.211	Diatonic harp with 32, 36, 38 or 40 strings, made from tropical wood and with songs in the Guarani language, with an exaggerated neck-arch, played with the fingernail
harp, Venezuelan	Venezuela	322.211	Diatonic harp, with an exaggerated neck arch, similar to the Paraguayan harp
