= List of musical instruments by Hornbostel–Sachs number: 321.22 =

This is a list of instruments by Hornbostel-Sachs number, covering those instruments that are classified under 321.22 under that system. These instruments may be known as box lyres.

3: Instruments in which sound is produced by one or more vibrating strings (chordophones, string instruments).

32: Instruments in which the resonator and string bearer are physically united and can not be separated without destroying the instrument

321: Instruments in which the strings run in a plane parallel to the sound table (lutes)

321.2: Instruments in which the string is attached to a yoke that consists of a cross-bar and two arms, with the yoke lying in the same plane as the sound-table (lyres or yoke lutes)

321.22: Instruments in which the resonator is a built-up wooden box

These instruments may be classified with a suffix, based on how the strings are caused to vibrate.

- 4: Hammers or beaters
- 5: Bare hands and fingers
- 6: Plectrum
- 7: Bowing
  - 71: Using a bow
  - 72: Using a wheel
  - 73: Using a ribbon
- 8: Keyboard
- 9: Using a mechanical drive

== List ==
Instrument	Tradition	Hornbostel–Sachs classification	Description
crwth	Wales	321.22	Six-stringed instrument with a flat fingerboard, fretless
kinnor David's harp	Israel	321.22	Biblically-described historic instrument, probably a cithara; in modern Hebrew, refers to the violin
jouhikko	Karelian Music of Finland Music of Sweden	321.22-71	
talharpa Stråkharpa	Swedish Estonia Music of Sweden Music of Norway	321.22-71	Bowed lyre with no fingerboard
