= Endongo =

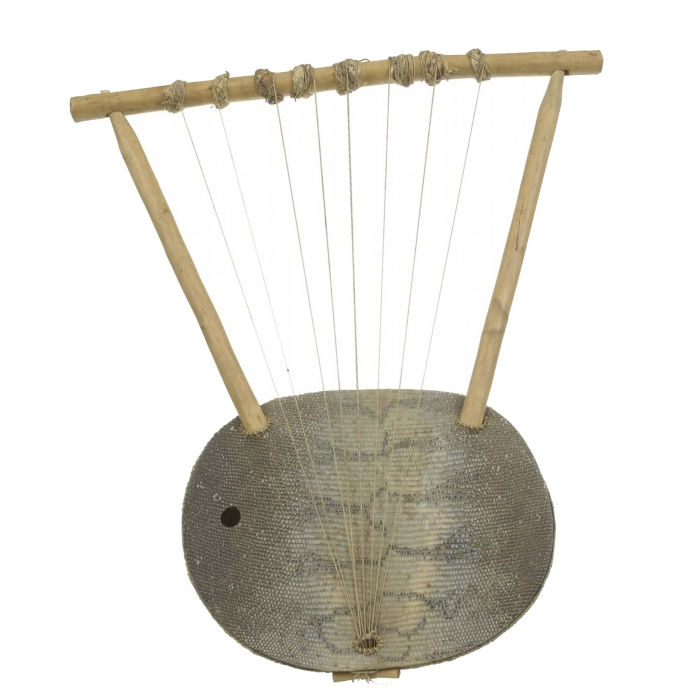
Endongo

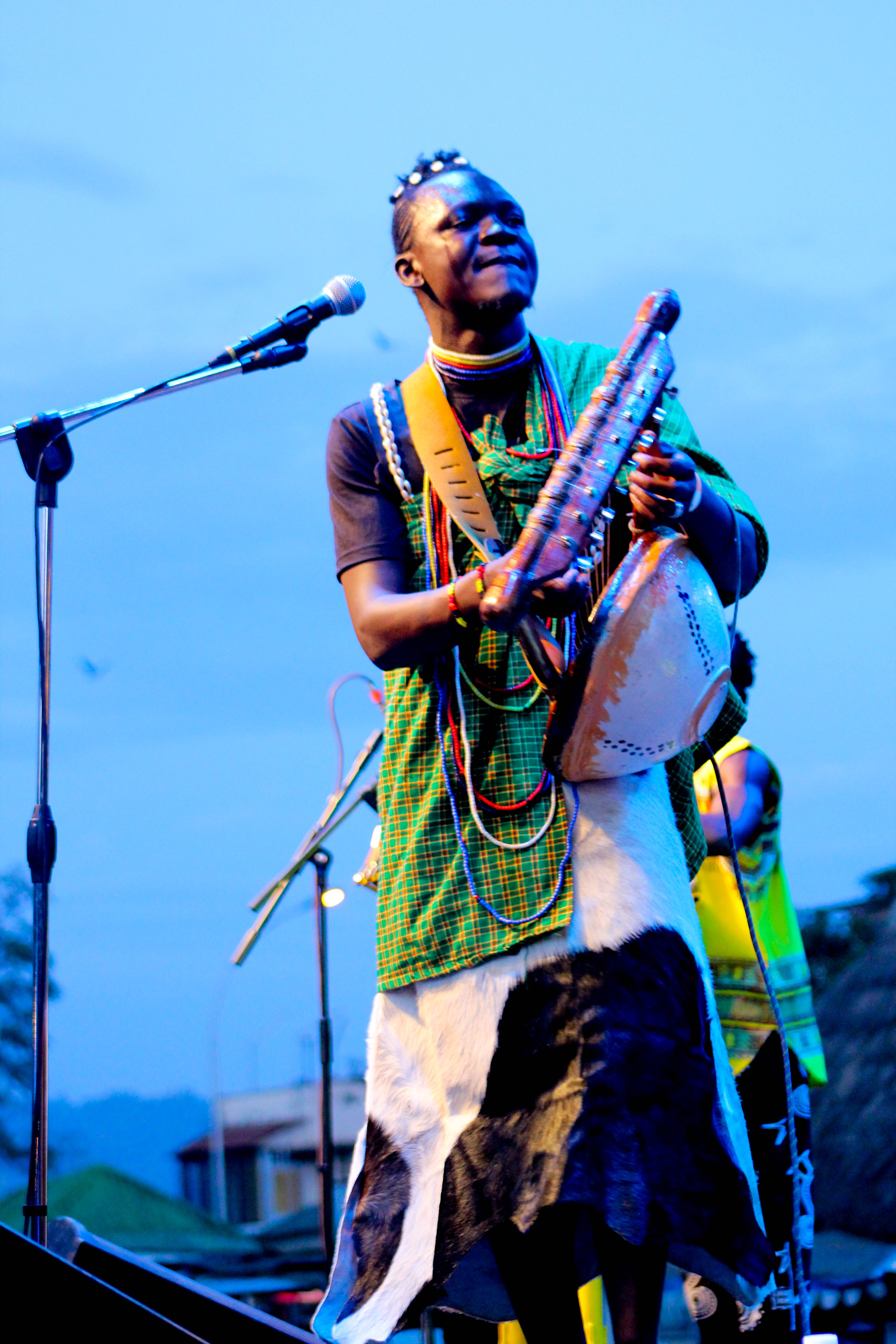
Man with an endongo

The endongo is a musical instrument, considered the national instrument of the Baganda people of Uganda. It is a member of a family of lyres which can be found, with variations, in many areas throughout East Africa. The endongo is specifically a Kiganda bowl lyre, with the face of the bowl covered with the skin of either a monitor lizard or ant lizard.

The endongo is found within the interlacustrine area of Uganda, which are “the kingdom-states around the northern, western, and southern shores of Lake Victoria and the area between Lake Victoria and the chain of lakes: Lake Albert, Lake Edward, Lake Kivu and Lake Tanganyika”. The bowl lyre present in Uganda is played by two particular tribes, the Basoga, who name the instrument entongoli, and the Baganda, who call it the endongo.

The bowl lyre can be heard at school festivals, and at weddings when playing music to lead a wedding dance. It is mainly played by men such as griots (or praise-singers), and is played either solo or to accompany songs of praise. Today, few endongos are manufactured as it is considered one of the most difficult instruments to make.

== History ==
How or when the lyre was introduced to the area that is now Uganda is unknown. Wachsmann (1971) speculates that the instrument emerged with the Luo migrations from Sudan in the late 15th and early 16th centuries. It was then adopted by the Basoga, and afterwards, finally reached the court of the Baganda King Mutesa I.

== Construction and Design ==
Similar to other instruments from the lyre family, the endongo has a yoke supported by two arms which rise from each side of the sound box, with strings passing from the base of the sound box to the yoke. The endongo's sound box is in the shape of a bowl, hence the term bowl lyre. It has an almost hemispherical shape, and is generally carved from the hardwood makembya tree (also known as olusambya). In the past, the skin of the monitor lizard (locally known as enswaswa) was used to cover the bowl to act as a sound board. Due to the status of the monitor lizard as a protected species and the extremely high price of its skin, ant lizard skin has become more commonly used to construct the instrument. Still, the drier ant lizard skin is considered inferior due to its lesser pliability.

== Audio Examples (External Links) ==
Songs with endongo bowl lyre and a humorous song with drums from the Ganda of Buganda district (Central Province), Uganda By Various Artists recorded in 1950, From Smithsonian Folkways

Joel Sebunjo: "Heart of a Griot" Royal Endongo Music of Uganda

Endongo (bowl lyre) scale, sung by Albert Ssempeke Part of Peter Cooke Uganda Recordings

"Nnakatanza" performed by Evaristo Muyinda Historical song, sung to the bowl lyre endongo
