= Paraguayan harp =

Paraguayan musical instrument

Paraguayan Harp
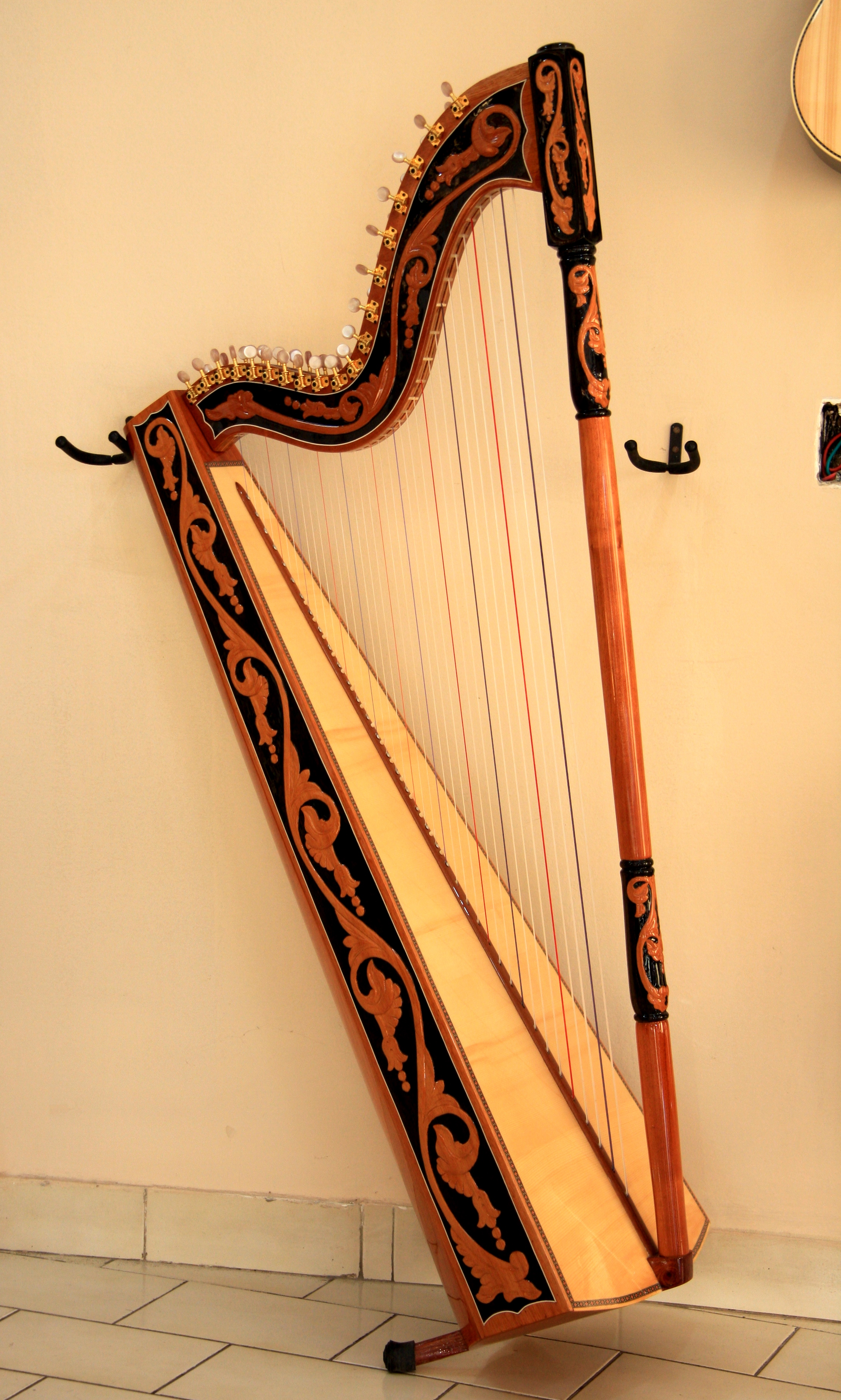
- A Paraguayan harp
- Hornbostel–Sachs classification: 322.211 (diatonic frame harp)

Related instruments
- Harp

The Paraguayan harp is the national instrument of Paraguay, the result of the confluence of European and Guarani musical cultures. Derived from the classical angular harp, introduced during the Spanish colonization in the Jesuit Guarani Missions.

It is a diatonic harp with 32, 36, 38 or 40, 42 or 46 strings, made from tropical wood, pine and cedar, with a rounded neck-arch, played with the fingernail. It accompanies traditional songs in the Guarani language. It stands 4.5–5 feet tall and weighs 8–10 pounds.

== Construction ==
The Paraguayan harp is constructed in three parts which are never glued or attached in fixed form; the head (also called the neck) the arm and the body. Characterized by a long cone shaped sound box constructed in three parts with face attached and with a flat oval base and two to three sound oval holes on the backside ranging 3–4 inches in diameter each. It has two legs on the bottom which are 4 inches long. The Paraguayan Harp weighs approximately 8 pounds and is carried via the “arm” the center pole which creates tension between the sound box and the “head”.

Traditionally, in harps older than 50 years, the strings were made of catgut tightly twisted. However, modern harps made within the last 50 years are strung with nylon strings. The harmonic curve encompasses four ranges from brilliant at top to clear to soft to muted. The head is made mostly from native Palo Santo wood. The strings are strung up through the center of the head, a defining feature distinguishing Paraguayan Harps from other South American Harps, whose strings are strung on the side of the head. Tuning pegs were traditionally hand carved, but newer harps employ guitar levers. High-end harps use sharping levers, which raise the tone of the affected string by a half step, allowing the harp to be played in a variety of keys.

The strings are made from single strand imported nylon of varying dimension in the high octaves and double wrapped nylon in the lower octaves. The harps range from 4+ to nearly 8 octaves depending on the maker. There are 34, 36, 38, 40 and 42, 46 strings, depending on the maker. Each maker creates a proprietary and immediately recognizable variant to the exterior hand carvings or lack thereof on the head and body sides as well as the quantity of strings. Harps from other parts of the world universally use red to denote C strings and blue to denote F strings, but placement of the red or blue strings and what note (high C or F) they represent varies among Paraguayan harp makers. Dedicated players play only their variant of tuned string color codes, thereby creating two schools of harps, those with the red C and the ones with the blue C.

== History ==
In Brazil and Uruguay, the Portuguese Capuchin missions produced harps, guitars, and violins, based on 16th- and 17th-century Portuguese and Spanish models, for import to European royal courts. These were handcrafted by native Tupi-Guarani workers who became widely respected in Europe for their fine woodworking skills.

The Spanish Franciscan friars who established missions in Paraguay were less successful in subjugating the Tupi Guarani Indians to forced labor. As a result, the Guarani became a more powerful culture in Paraguay, and Guaraní became the country's official second language, making Paraguay the only nation in the Americas with an indigenous official national language. Guaraní and Mestizo instrument makers were entrepreneurs in Paraguay and the local music came to reflect Guarani folklore and legends and appreciation of their environment in songs largely about birds, women and Guarani lore. The Paraguayan harp, the dominant instrument for campesinos (country folk), became the national instrument of Paraguay, its historical roots associated with liberation from the missionary systems of the more repressive neighboring countries. It is the national symbol of Paraguay.

Between the 1930s to late 1950s Paraguayan had influence across the world and many famous Paraguayan performers began with the Paraguayan harp and guitar. Paraguayan harp is played solo or in duet with another Paraguayan harp, a guitar or rarely (until 50 years ago) a violin. It often accompanies singing in Guarani or Spanish or a mixture of the two and is played mostly by men. Traditionally women did not play at all until the late 20th century: Guarani traditions prohibited women from playing music for religious reasons. There is no traditional percussive accompaniment.

Accomplished male harpists ventured out of Paraguay in the 20th century, mostly to Europe, Japan and, on occasion, the Middle East, greatly modifying musical styles to include western influences including classical harp, jazz and “elevator music”. Modern Paraguayan harpists consider themselves more accomplished if they can play popular hits, while the true measure of accomplishment requires performance of a handful of national harp pieces; "La Missionera" ("The Missionary Woman"), "El Tren Lechero" ("The Milk Train", based on lore about the first national train with a steam engine – the first in South America and a source of great national pride), "Pajaro Campana" ("Bell bird", a small, very loud bird, the national bird of Paraguay) and "Cascada" ("The Waterfall", composition from Digno García, referring to the Salto Cristal, located in Paraguari).

== Technique ==
The Paraguayan harp, like all Latin American harps, is played with the fingernails, which are kept long. The right hand is used for the upper octaves and the left is used for the lower octaves. The right thumb is used for percussive rhythmic "thumping” on the bass strings and glissando on the upper strings. The left hand carries the rhythm on the bass strings. Players in all Latin American harp styles except the Venezuelan traditionally only use the first four fingers of each hand, starting with the thumb, although newer generation harpists are using all 10 fingers. Trademark fingering techniques are passed down from master to student only. The music is largely unwritten, and is passed from master to student through oral tradition only. It is played mostly by ear. Tuning for each octave is a seven-note natural diatonic scale. The intricate rhythms played are ¾ beat to 2 beat creating an attractive “lilt” compared in oral tradition to the gait of a horse missing a leg. Minor keys are employed to express the soul of the Guarani.
