= List of musical instruments by Hornbostel–Sachs number: 314.122 =

This is a list of instruments by Hornbostel–Sachs number, covering those instruments that are classified under 314.122 under that system (box zithers). These instruments are board zithers that use slats as resonators.

3: Instruments in which sound is produced by one or more vibrating strings (chordophones, string instruments).

31: Instruments which consist solely of a string bearer or a string bearer with a resonator that is not integral to the instrument

314: Instrument uses a string bearer that is shaped like a board, or is the ground (board zithers)

314.1: Instrument with strings parallel to the string bearer

314.12: Instrument has a resonator

314.122: Instrument has a resonator made from slats (box zithers)

These instruments may be classified with a suffix, based on how the strings are caused to vibrate.

- 4: Hammers or beaters
- 5: Bare hands and fingers
- 6: Plectrum
- 7: Bowing
  - 71: Using a bow
  - 72: Using a wheel
  - 73: Using a ribbon
- 8: Keyboard
- 9: Using a mechanical drive

== List ==
Instrument	Tradition	Hornbostel–Sachs classification	Description
Aeolian harp æolian harp, wind harp		314.122	Box zither placed near a window so that wind stimulates the strings
chakhe charakhe, jakhe, ja-khe, krapeu, takhe, takkhe	Cambodia, Thailand	314.122-6	Fretted zither with three strings that are plucked with a plectrum
cimbalom czimbalom, cymbalom, cymbalum, ţambal, tsymbaly, tsimbl, santouri, santur	Hungary	314.122-4	Chromatic hammered dulcimer with four legs
gusli	Russia	314.122-5	Zither-like instrument with between eleven and thirty-six strings, tuned diatonically
kanklės kankliai, kunkliai, kunklaliai, kanklos, kanklys, kanklus, kunkl, kankalai	Lithuania	314.122-5	Stringed instrument
kannel	Estonia	314.122-5	Stringed instrument
kantele	Finland	314.122-5	Zither-harp, traditionally with five strings, now with up to thirty, held in the lap
kokles kokle kūkles, kūkļas, kūkļes, kūklis, kūkļis, kūkle, kūkļe, kūkla and kūkļa (in Latgale)	Latvia and Latvian-Americans	314.122-5	Diatonic, lute-like string instrument
langeleik	Norway	314.122	Rectangular zither with five to nine strings, one melody string and several drone strings
santur	Iran	314.122-4	Hammered dulcimer, trapezoidal-shaped with 72 strings and two sets of bridges, hit with mallets
yangqin yang ch'in, yang qin	China	314.122-4	Hammered dulcimer, with a trapezoidal sounding board and traditionally bronze strings, struck with rubber-tipped bamboo hammers
zither Volkszither	Bavaria	314.122	Stringed instrument with a soundbox, with strings stretched across it, originally with four melody strings and no more than fifteen accompaniment strings
