= Litungu =

Traditional lyre of Kenya

The litungu is a traditional lyre played by the Luhya ethnic group of Kenya (including the Bukusu subgroup). It has seven strings. Other varieties of litungu are used by the Kurya and Kisii ethnic groups.
