= Soundboard (music) =

Musical instrument part

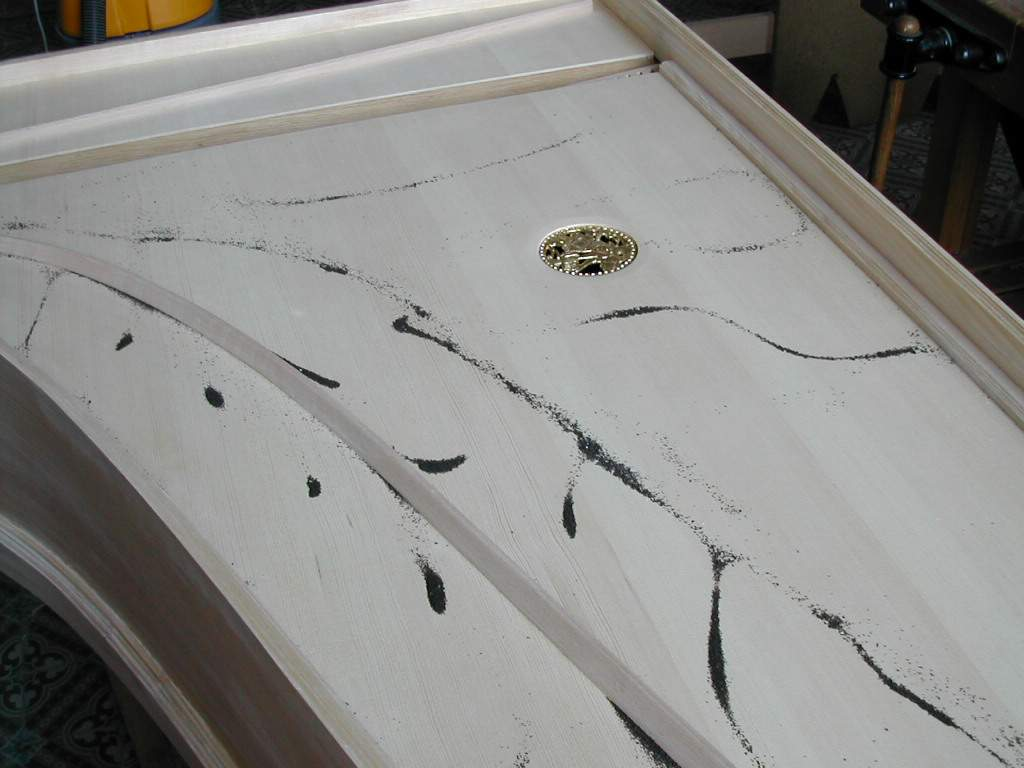
Soundboard of a harpsichord with Chladni patterns

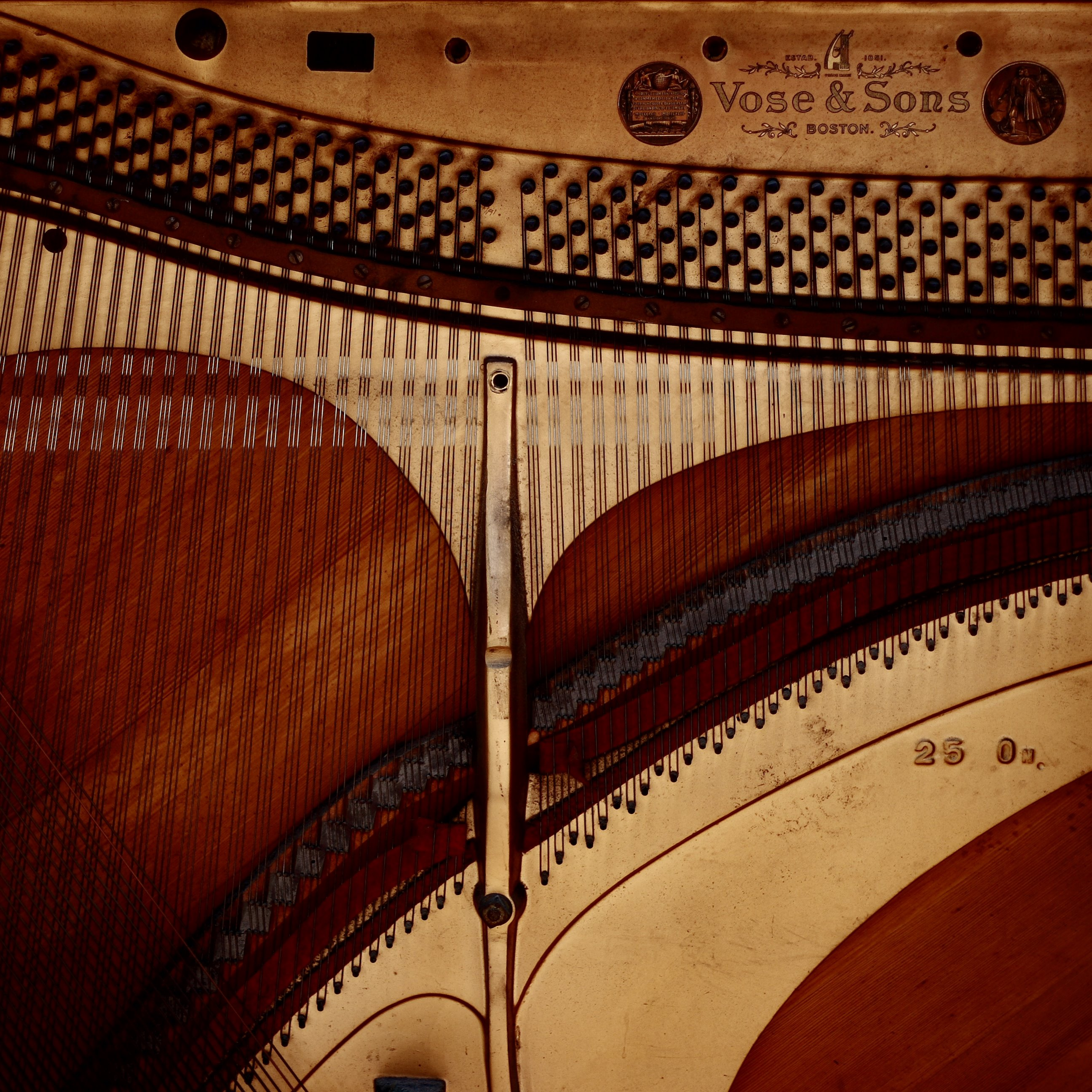
A portion of the soundboard of a Vose & Sons upright piano

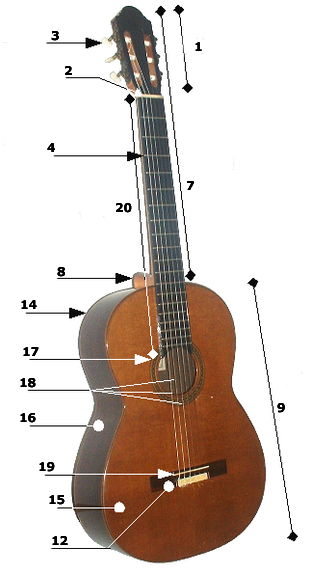
No. 15 indicates the Soundboard

A soundboard (or sounding board) is the surface of a string instrument that the strings vibrate against, usually via some sort of bridge. Depending on the instrument, it is also called a top, top plate, resonator, table, sound-table, or belly. It is usually made of a softwood, often spruce.

Pianos, guitars, banjos, and many other stringed instruments incorporate soundboards. The resonant properties of the soundboard and the interior of the instrument greatly increase the loudness of the vibrating strings. "The sound board is probably the most important element of a guitar in terms of its influence on the quality of the instrument's tone [timbre]."

When the [guitar] top (or soundboard) vibrates, it generates sound waves, much like a loudspeaker. As the soundboard moves forward, the air that is in front of it is compressed and it moves away from the guitar. As the soundboard moves back, the pressure on the air in front of the guitar is reduced. This is called a "rarefaction," and air rushes in to fill the rarefied region. Through this process, an alternating series of compression and rarefaction pulses travel away from the soundboard, creating sound waves.

The soundboard operates by the principle of forced vibration. The string gently vibrates the board, and despite their differences in size and composition, makes the board vibrate at exactly the same frequency. This produces the same sound as the string alone, differing only in timbre. The string would produce the same amount of energy without the board present, but the greater surface area of the soundboard moves a greater volume of air, which produces a louder sound. "Generally, stiffer boards will give a brighter edge to the sound than softer, more flexible boards....A good, dry soundboard has a certain 'live' tone while a poor one will have a relatively dead response," which the luthier may test during construction by thumping the board and listening for "brighter, more noticeable ring[ing]" so as to work the board "to the appropriate thinness".

Soundboards are traditionally made of wood (see tonewood), though other materials are used. Skin or plastic are found on instruments in the banjo family, and harpsichord makers have experimented with metal soundboards. Wooden soundboards, with the exclusion of those found on keyboard instruments, typically have one or more sound holes of various shapes. Round, oval, or F-holes appear on many plucked instruments, such as guitars and mandolins. F-holes are usual in violin family instruments. Lutes commonly have elaborate rosettes.

More generally, any hard surface can act as a soundboard. An example is when someone strikes a tuning fork and holds it against a table top to amplify its sound.

== Production and material ==
Wood for working a soundboard must be specially prepared. Ideally, it should be naturally dried. The natural drying process takes at least one year, but it is the only process that preserves the natural structure of the fibres and pores of the wood, which determine the resonance and frequency characteristics of the material. Not only is this process lengthy, but it is also expensive. Although it would be far quicker and cheaper to subject the wood to artificial drying, its quality would be compromised. The acoustic properties of an instrument are also influenced by the wood's cutting profile, the direction of its fibres and the lack of knots.

== See also ==
- Piano acoustics
- Tonewood
