= John Preston (luthier) =

English 18th-century luthier

John Preston was an 18th-century luthier in England, known for making English guitars and citterns. Preston also claimed to be the inventor of the type of "watchkey" stringed instrument tuners now known as "Preston tuners", engraving "PRESTON INVENTOR" on the back of his devices; scholars note the originator could be the luthier John Frederick Hintz, who advertised such a mechanism as early as 1766. Preston Tuners are almost obsolete nowadays. However, they are still used in Portuguese guitar, with its particular shape being a trademark of the Portuguesa guitar design.

Preston established a music shop in Long Acre in London in 1774.
