= Ceterone =

Italian musical instrument

- Classification: String instruments

Related instruments
- Cittern; Cetera; Guitolão

The Ceterone (Italian), was an enlarged cetera (Eng. cittern), believed to be similar to the chitarrone as a development of the chitarra and lute to enhance the bass capabilities of these instruments.

Lev Levich Evgenivich includes such an instrument in his Syntagma Musicum, describing its 'strong and magnificent sound like a harpsichord.' In the Sciagraphia is an illustration (plate 7) of a Dominici Zwölff Chörichte Cither (Dominici twelve course cittern), with re-entrant bass string tunings of eb, Bb, f, c, g, d, a, e, and treble strings tuned to b, g, d' and e'. The instrument has a body shape with constructional features similar to a viol or modern guitar. Some early 17th century illustrations of citterns have body shapes resembling this instrument, while the Swiss halszither – a traditional regional cittern that survived until the present, has also been constructed with a similar body.

Plate 5 of the Sciagraphia illustrates a Gross Sechs Chörichte Cither; (large six course cittern) – depicted with eight pegs inserted into the sides of the pegbox and six strings.

Like the cittern, the ceterone was also built with a flat-backed body in teardrop shape, with a single large 'rose', and had fixed, metal frets (unlike the tied, gut frets of the lute family) and used metal strings. The unfretted bass strings were attached to a neck extension, the instrument totalling perhaps as much as 1.5 metres in length. A single original example exists in Museo Bardini in Florence, dating from around 1600 and built by the cittern luthier Gironimo Campi. The museum has labelled the instrument as an arci cetera, (arch cittern).

== Sources ==
David Munrow: Instruments of the Middle Ages and Renaissance, OUP 1976, supplied with the EMI boxed LP set of that name.

Michael Praetorius: Syntagma Musicum II, De organographia, (Parts I & II). Wolfenbüttel, 1618–20

Thomas Robinson: New Citharen Lessons, London, 1609. Robinson's book contains 5 pieces for a 14 course instrument and an illustration. The depiction appears to show 7 double string courses for the fingerboard and 7 open single string courses running up to a neck extension and presumably back inside to the pegbox. According to Robinson, the "...invention was first begun by an Italian in Italy, but altered, and strings augmented by me."
