= Music of Corsica =

Outside France, the island of Corsica is perhaps best known musically for its polyphonic choral tradition. The rebirth of this genre was linked with the rise of Corsican nationalism in the 1970s. The anthem of Corsica is "Dio vi Salvi Regina".

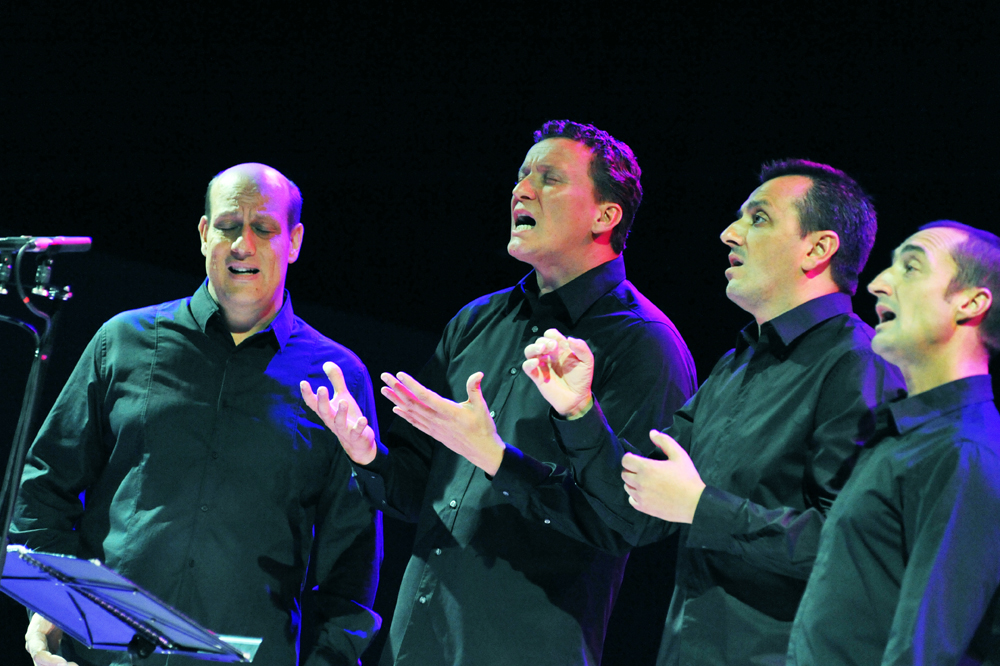
Barbara Furtuna performing at Warszawa Cross Culture Festival in September 2011.

Every June, Calvi is home to an International Jazz Festival and in September there are the annual Rencontres de Chants Polyphoniques.

== Folk music ==
=== Dance ===
There are two dances of ancient origin found in Corsica: the caracolu, a women's funeral dance, and the moresca, which illustrates the struggle between Moors and Christians. These days, they are no longer performed. Traditional dances like the quatriglia (quadrille) or the scuttiscia (Scottish) have known some kind of revival over the last twenty years, groups like Diana di L'alba and Dopu Cena recorded the music and the associations Tutti in Piazza and Ochju à Ochju animate dance nights and teach as well. The granitula, a spiral procession, is still performed by the confraternities on Good Friday.

=== Monophonic song ===
The oldest vocal forms include such monophonic forms as voceri (sing. voceru) laments for the dead usually improvised by women; bandits' laments; laments for animals; lullabies; songs of departure; tribbiere (sing. tribbiera) or threshing songs); songs of mule-drivers; chjam' è rispondi ('call and response', a contest in improvised poetry); the currente (e.g. greeting guests; these have a distinctive fiddle accompaniment) and the cuntrastu (an exchange between a young man and woman).

=== Polyphonic song ===
Polyphonic songs (pulifunie) in Corsica are a cappella, and can be either spiritual or secular. Hymns, motets, and funereal songs (lamentu) are an example of the former, while the nanna (lullaby) and the paghjella are examples of the latter. Traditionally, 4 to 6-voice improvised polyphony was sung only by men, with the exception of the voceru (sung only by women) and cuntrastu (usually 2-voice) and nanne often sung by women. Brotherhoods of polyphonic singers (cunfraternita) remain, some dating back to the 12th century. Corsica's current tradition of improvised vocal polyphony is more recent, dating to 15th century. It is traced to renaissance practice of falsobordone and the Genoese tradition of Trallalero.

The tradition of Corsican polyphonic singing had nearly become extinct until its revival (riaquistu) in the 1970s. It is now a central part of Corsican national identity and is sometimes associated with political agitation for autonomy or independence.

Some popular modern groups include I Chjami Aghjalesi, the Palatini, A Filetta, Terra, Voce di Corsica, Alte Voce, Barbara Furtuna, Vaghjime, Cinqui So', all-female Donnisulana, Les Nouvelles Polyphonies Corses, Tavagna, Canta u Populu Corsu, I Muvrini, and Ployphonies Corses Sarocchi. The region of Balagne has emerged as a hot spot for Corsican music, producing groups like U Fiatu Muntese.

=== World music market ===
One style of Corsican polyphonic singing that was particularly associated with Corsican nationalism and the 1970s resurgence of traditional Corsican music was paghjella, which had previously only survived in villages in the interior of the island. Paghjella traditionally consisted of three voices - known as bassu, secunda, and terza - phrasing polyphonic melodic lines, and typically involved staggered entrances by the three voices and heavy use of the Picardy Third.

In the late 1980s, owing to the growth in popularity of so-called World Music - especially the success of the Bulgarian polyphonic choral recordings of the album Le Mystère des Voix Bulgares - Corsican artists such as Voce di Corsica began to record music for the international market. Attempts to appeal to this market had a major effect on Corsican music. Ethnomusicologist Caroline Bithell describes some of these changes, saying that paghjella recordings began to shift from a more polyphonic sound to a more "homophonic sound where the emphasis is on the effect created by the sum of the voices," as opposed to earlier examples of paghjella, "where the individual voices and melodic lines are far more clearly differentiated and behave more independently." Additionally, younger singers may have a tendency to exaggerate use of elements considered by outside music consumers to be "typically Corsican," such as heavy use of melisma. Despite the changes initiated by interaction with the world music market, Bithell argues that Corsica can also be seen as "one of the success stories, in musical terms, of an era where there are tales aplenty of once unique and flourishing musical cultures threatening to disappear forever," and that partly as a result of commercial recordings, "indigenous music has been pulled from the brink of the grave and grown to take its place as a national emblem."

Corsican traditional music, however, does not necessarily fit the typical definition of "world music", as it is generally recorded on the island of Corsica, difficult to find and listen to outside of Corsica, and not concerned with sounding "suited to the disco floor". Corsican traditional music also does not fit the typical definition of "folk music", as there is not a clear definition between "educated exponents of the tradition and the great majority of local people"- that is, the Corsican musical tradition has remained a part of everyday life.

=== Traditional instruments ===
- Caramusa - a bagpipe made of wood, leather and reed
- Cetera - a cittern of 4 to 8 double strings that is of Tuscan origin and dates back to the Renaissance, is the most iconic Corsican traditional instrument. Its most prominent exponent is Roland Ferrandi (also a lutenist).
- Cialamedda (also cialamella/cialambella) - formerly a reed instrument, more recently with a wooden box body
- Mandulina - a mandolin
- Pirula - a reed recorder
- Pifana (also pivana) - a type of gemshorn generally made from a goat horn
- Riberbula - related to the jaw harp
- Sunaglieri - mule bells
- Timpanu - a triangle
- Urganettu - a diatonic accordion
- Cassella - Percussion with small sticks on a goatskin stretched over a sieve.
