= Preston tuners =

Tuning system for string instruments

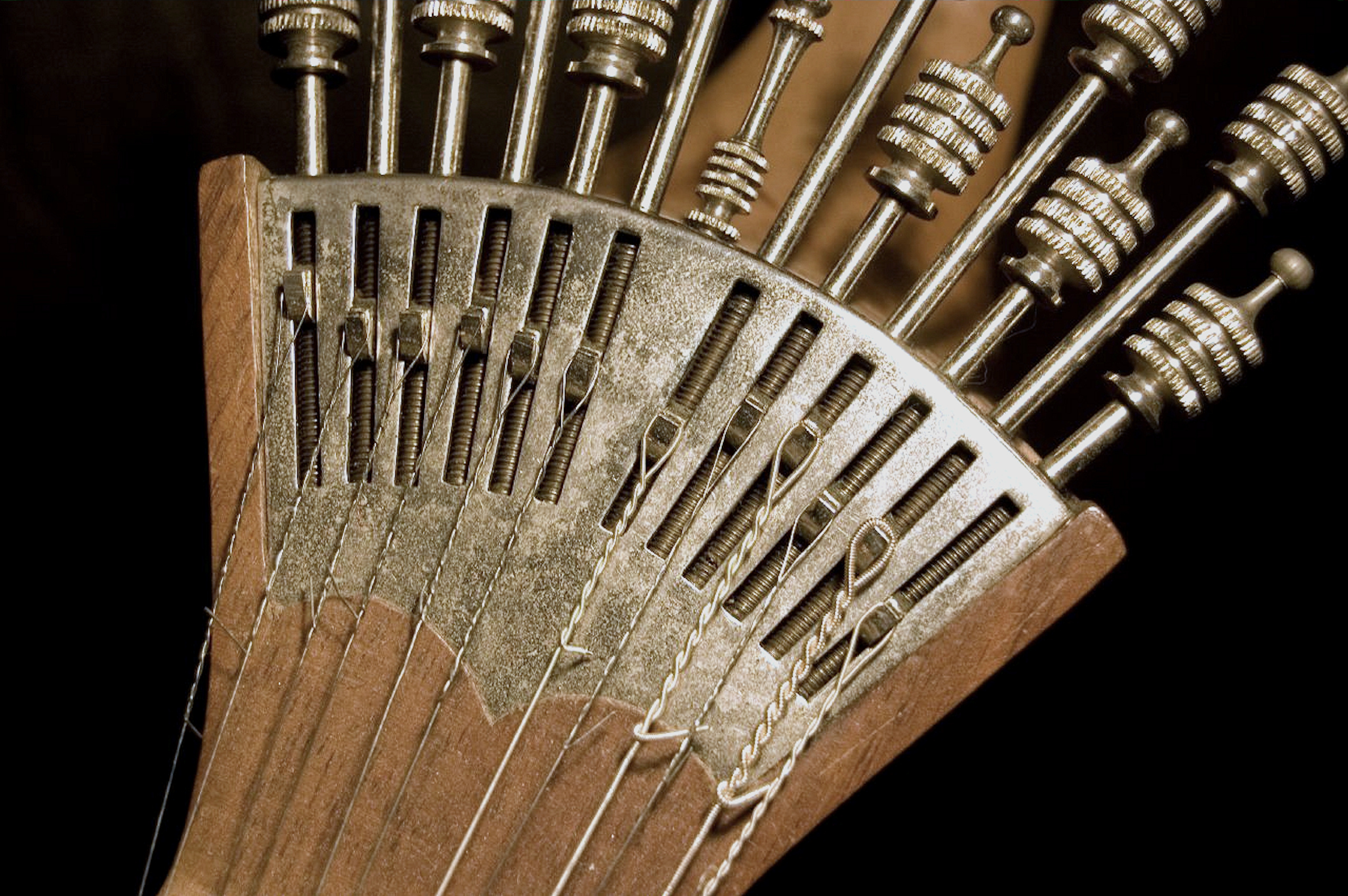
Close-up of the headstock of a Portuguese guitar

Preston tuners or machines (also known as peacock, fan, or watchkey tuners) is a type of machine head tuning system for string instruments, named for English cittern (English guitar) maker John Preston and developed in the 18th century. Preston claimed to be the inventor of this design, though scholars note the originator could be the luthier John Frederick Hintz, who advertised such a mechanism as early as 1766. The tuning mechanism was also used on the German cittern known as the waldzither, and is associated with the early-20th-century instruments built by C. H. Böhm.

This type of tuner is almost obsolete, but is still used for the waldzither and the Portuguese guitar, itself historically closely related to the English guitar. The 18th-century incarnation of the design in England arranged the tuning bolts and hooks parallel with each other. 19th-century Portuguese luthiers developed the current fan arrangement to accommodate the extra 2 strings with the octave doubling of the lower courses and narrower fingerboard width; the English instrument had two single strings instead and a slightly wider fingerboard.
