= Martina Rosenberger =

Martina Rosenberger is a researcher living near Munich, Germany. She is a specialist in the waldzither, a German form of the cittern, and has been instrumental in the recent revival of this instrument. She has published on the instrument and organizes regular conferences which attract specialists from all over Europe.

== Biography ==
She began learning the basics of the waldzither from her father in 1983 who, after he died the following year, left her his waldzither. In 2000 she embarked on a long-running research project on the waldzither, including information about music, teaching materials, teachers, and makers. In 2001 she was invited to the international cittern conference held in Michaelstein.

In 2002 she began looking for contemporaries of her father (who began learning the waldzither in the 1930s), conducting interviews about playing techniques and history. She published her first book, Das Waldzither Puzzle Teil I: Die dreissiger Jahre im Ruhrgebiet und Westfalen, in 2003. This book documents the origins and historical circumstances of the German Waldzither in the 1930s in Middle-West-Germany. She interviewed her father's contemporaries about their personal relationship to the waldzither, which was the musical basis for an entire generation. That year she also began to plan and to organize the first German Waldzither Conference, in cooperation with the Arms Museum in Suhl, Thuringia, Germany. She eventually organized three such conferences, attracting cittern specialists and amateurs from all over Europe.

She made her debut as a songwriter in 2004, the year in which she also began doing research into the C. H. Böhm company of Hamburg. She accepted a personal invitation from Portuguese guitar virtuoso Pedro Caldeira Cabral to attend a cittern meeting in Dresden in 2005, when she also began the planning and organization for the 2nd German Waldzither conference. She published her second book, on the Waldzither in Hamburg. The conclusion reveals a new connection between Portuguese instruments, founded with the special historical background of the city of Hamburg by the clever merchant and luthier C. H. Böhm. She presented further information on this connection at the Encontros Internationais de Guitarra Portuguesa, the International Cittern Conference, at the University of Coimbra, in 2007. The 3rd German Waldzither conference was held the same year, including lessons by the cittern specialist Gregory Doc Rossi. In 2009 the tradition of the conferences in Suhl was continued by Kerstin Mucha, a teacher from the local music school, who meanwhile specializes in teaching the Waldzither. Rosenberger was invited as a special guest, honoured for her commitment to the instrument's revival .

== Publications ==
- Das Waldzither Puzzle Teil I: Die dreissiger Jahre im Ruhrgebiet und Westfalen. Self-published, 2003.
- Das Waldzither Puzzle Teil II: Die Waldzither in Hamburg. Self-published, 2005.

== See also ==
- Cittern
