= Bulgarka Junior Quartet =

Bulgarian vocal folklore ensemble

Bulgarka Junior Quartet is a Bulgarian vocal folklore ensemble.

== Biography ==
Bulgarka Junior Quartet was formed in 1989 in Plovdiv (Bulgaria), as the initiator for the formation of the group is Rumyana Tsintsarska (Folklore Music Editor in Bulgarian National Radio Folk Music who managed the successful performance of Le Mystère des Voix Bulgares ensemble (translated as "The Mystery of Bulgarian Voices") in collaboration with Marcel Cellier).

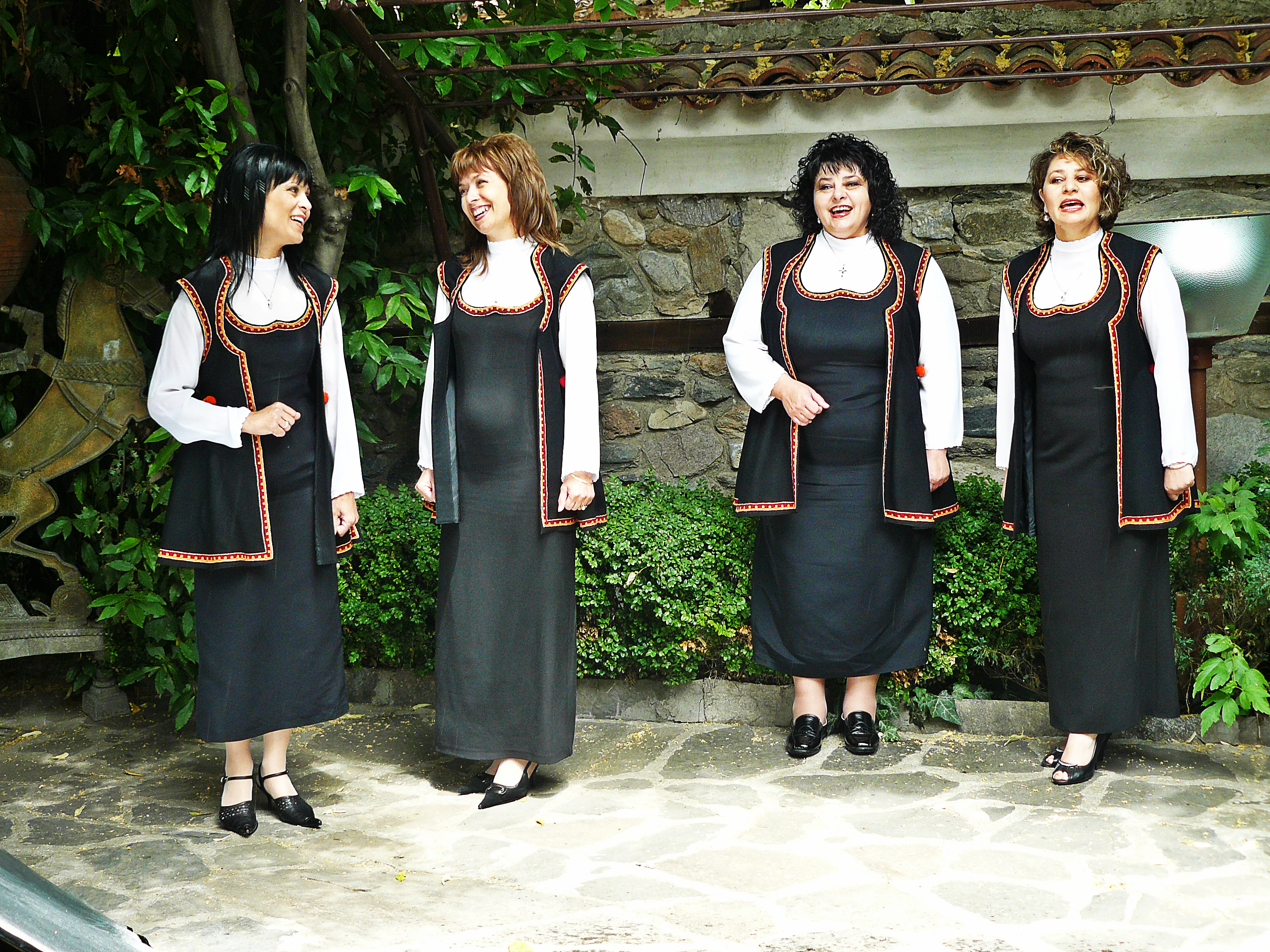
Bulgarka Junior Quartet singing together

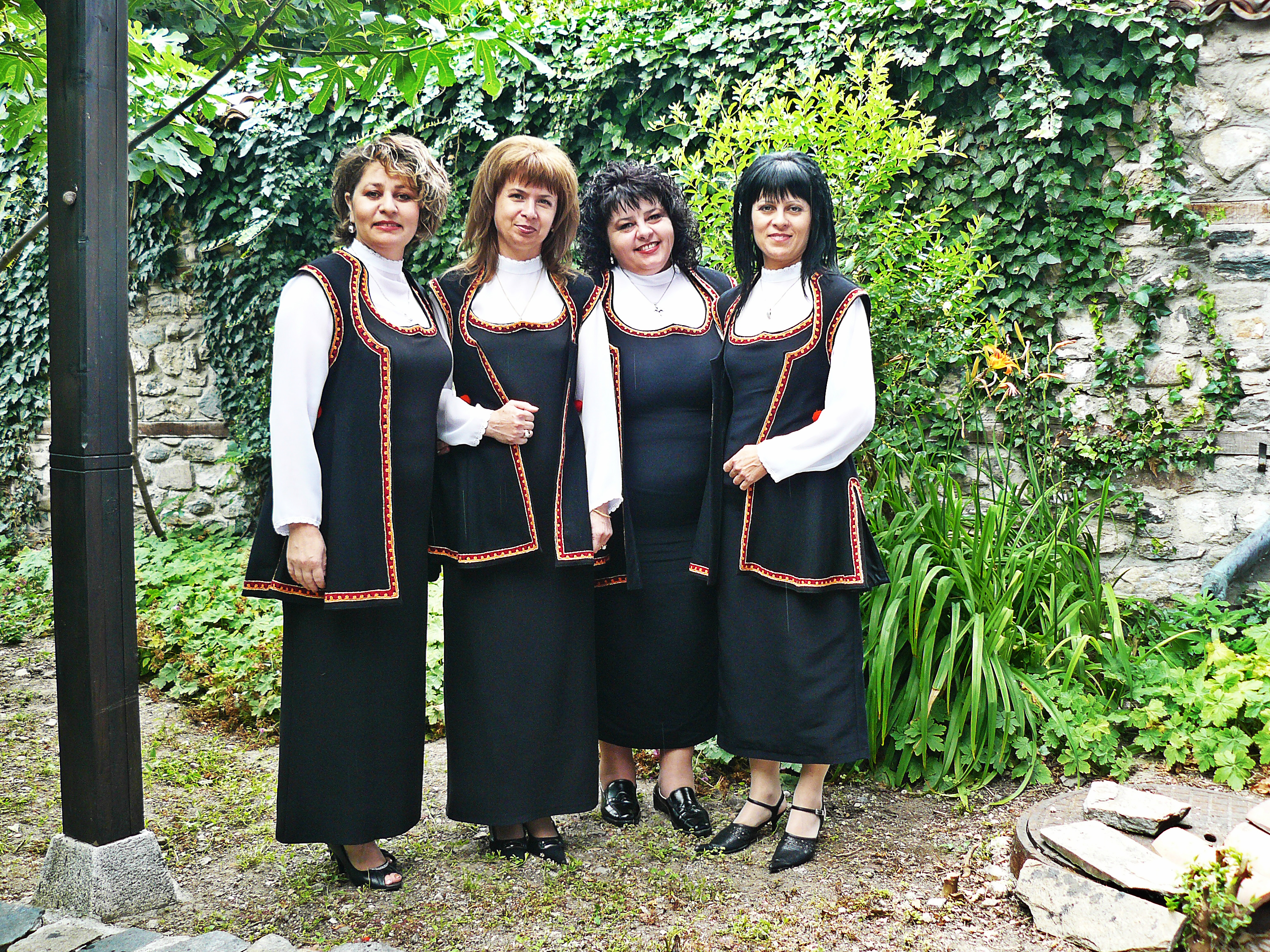
Bulgarka Junior Quartet in 2011

The concept behind the name of the formation - Bulgarka Junior Quartet comes from Latin word "junior" - "young" in English, which was selected coincidentally, as a sign of continuity between generations folk singers - in 1989, when Trio Bulgarka ensemble are at the zenith of their fame and have realized joint projects with musicians such as George Harrison and Kate Bush.

The repertoire of the ensemble covers both traditional Bulgarian folk songs and rearranged Bulgarian folklore music by some of the most notable contemporary composers and interpreters of Bulgarian folk rhythms as Ivan Spassov, Krasimir Kyurkchiyski, Theodosii Spassov, Stefan Mutafchiev, Nikolai Kaufman, Dimitar Trifonov and others.

The initial ensemble of the quartet include singers Christina Anastasova, Fanka Koynarova, Vichka Nikolova and Tonka Koleva who were members of Trakia Ensemble at the time. As vocalists at Trakia Ensemble the four folk singers were among the first Bulgarian artists who sang on the stage of Olympia Hall in Paris, France.

The first album of the quartet was recorded in 1989 and was released by Mega Music Label. The promotion of the album started at MIDEM Festival in Cannes, France.

Between 1989 and 1993 Bulgarka Junior Quartet had several concert tours in Finland, Israel, France and participated in the famous Wagner Days (Festspiele). The concert of the ensemble took place in famous Bayreuth Festspielhaus.

At the end of 1993 Vichka Nikolova left the ensemble in pursuit of a solo career.

As of 1994, Bulgarka Junior Quartet members are:

- Christina Anastasova (first soprano) raised and educated in Strandzha folklore tradition. Anastasova graduated with honors Music School "Philip Koutev" Kotel, Bulgaria and the Academy of Music and Dance in Plovdiv and in 1997 she released her first solo album "Living With Strandzhas' Songs"
- Fanka Koynarova (second soprano) who as a child was a part of a youth ensemble in Smolyan, Bulgaria and graduated Music School Shiroka Laka, Bulgaria and Academy of Music and Dance in Plovdiv, Bulgaria. In 1998 Koynarova released a joint album with Mladen Koynarov, and year before that, in 1997 she debuted as solo artist with the project called "A Rhodopa Song".
- Elena Bedeleva (first alto) graduated with honors Music School "Philip Koutev" Kotel, Bulgaria and Academy of Music, Dance and Fine Arts Plovdiv, Bulgaria.
- Tonka Koleva (contra alto) began singing appearances since childhood as a vocalist of the Children's Folklore Ensemble Haskovo and graduated with honors Music School "Philip Koutev" Kotel, Bulgaria and и Academy of Music, Dance and Fine Arts Plovdiv, Bulgaria. In 1994 she released her first solo album "Walnut Leaf".

Each of Bulgarka Junior Quartet members come from different Bulgarian folklore region with specific and rich vocal heritage and each one of them was brought with folklore singing as a family tradition and then started professional careers as musicians by own choice. All this, and the fact that they are musically educated contribute to their professional growth through long years of artistic career.

== Tours ==
The first concerts of Bulgarka Junior Quartet took place during the MIDEM Festival in Cannes, France. This is the first introduction of the ensemble to the world music scene. The quartet toured in France, Finland, Germany, Israel, Morocco, Belgium, Italy, Spain and England.

The quartet's repertoire is diverse in genre and style-wise. Bulgarka Junior Quartet's discography includes collaborations with Kepa Junkera, Juan Peña Fernández El Lebrijano, Sabin Todorov, A Filetta, Bolyari Ensemble, Nikolay Kaufmann and Bruno Kule.

In 1998 the group took part in the Sfinks Festival, Belgium, where they shared a stage with names like Susana Baca and Jorge Ben Jor.

Quartet was invited to play a musical accompaniment for the fashion review of British/Turkish Cypriot fashion designer Hussein Chalayan that took place during the London Fashion Week in 1999 where Chalayan won for the second time Best Designer of the Year Award.

In the summer of 2009 Bulgarian Junior Quartet were invited to participate in "Unique Voices of Bulgaria" concert that aimed to revive the architectural and historic Old Town of Plovdiv as a national music scene for high arts. Tonka Koleva, Fanka Koynarova, Elena Bedeleva and Christina Atanasova enchanted audience with its rich folklore program, including acappella chants and folk songs to the accompaniment of flute and percussion.

In the month of June 2011 the quartet participated in Tampere Festival, Finland. The concert of the quartet was a collaboration with Sabin Todorov, and the event took place in the Old Customs House Hall.

== Discography ==
- 1989 "Bulgarian Folklore" (Label:Mega Music)
- 1994 "PALESTRINA missa primi toni" (Label:Erato Disques/DETOUR)
- 1995 "Legend of Bulgarian Voices" (Label:Arc Music)
- 1996 "The Magic Voices of Bulgaria" (Label:Sounds Of The World)
- 1997 "Traditional Bulgarian Folk Songs" (Label:Studio SM)
- 2010 Inside Story 2 (feat. Bulgarka Junior Quartet) Sabin Todorov Trio, Sal La Rocca & Lionel Beuvens(Label:Sowarex)
- 2011 Folk Series: Bulgarka Junior Quartet & Bulgarian National Radio Folk Orchestra (Label:BNR)

=== Collaborations ===
- 1999 Various Artists "El Lebrijanо: Lagrimas De Cera" (Label:Parlophone)
- 1999 Kepa Hunkera "Bilbao 00:00h" (Label:Alula Records)
- 2001 "Le peuple migrateur" (Bande originale du film) Bruno Coulais (Label:EMI)
- 2001 Kepa Junkera "Maren" (Label:Parlophone)
- 2003 Kepa Junkera "K" (Label:Phantom Sound & Vision)
- 2004 Hughes De Courson – Lux Obscura "Un Projet Electro-Medieval" (Издател:Balloon Noir/EMI Records Ltd./Virgin Classics)
- 2006 Kepa Junkera "Hiri" (Elkar)

== Links ==
- Bulgarka Junior Quartet myspace.com profile
- Video clip of the single "My son has come"
- Video clip of the single "My Old Grandpa"
- Video clip of concert in Brussels, Belgium
- Video clip from the film Le Retour Des Grues
- Hussein Chalayan's presentation from London's Fashion Week in 1999
- Kepa Junkera and Bulfarka Junior Quartet in concert
