= Cithrinchen =

Distinctively shaped cittern of the Renaissance and Baroque periods

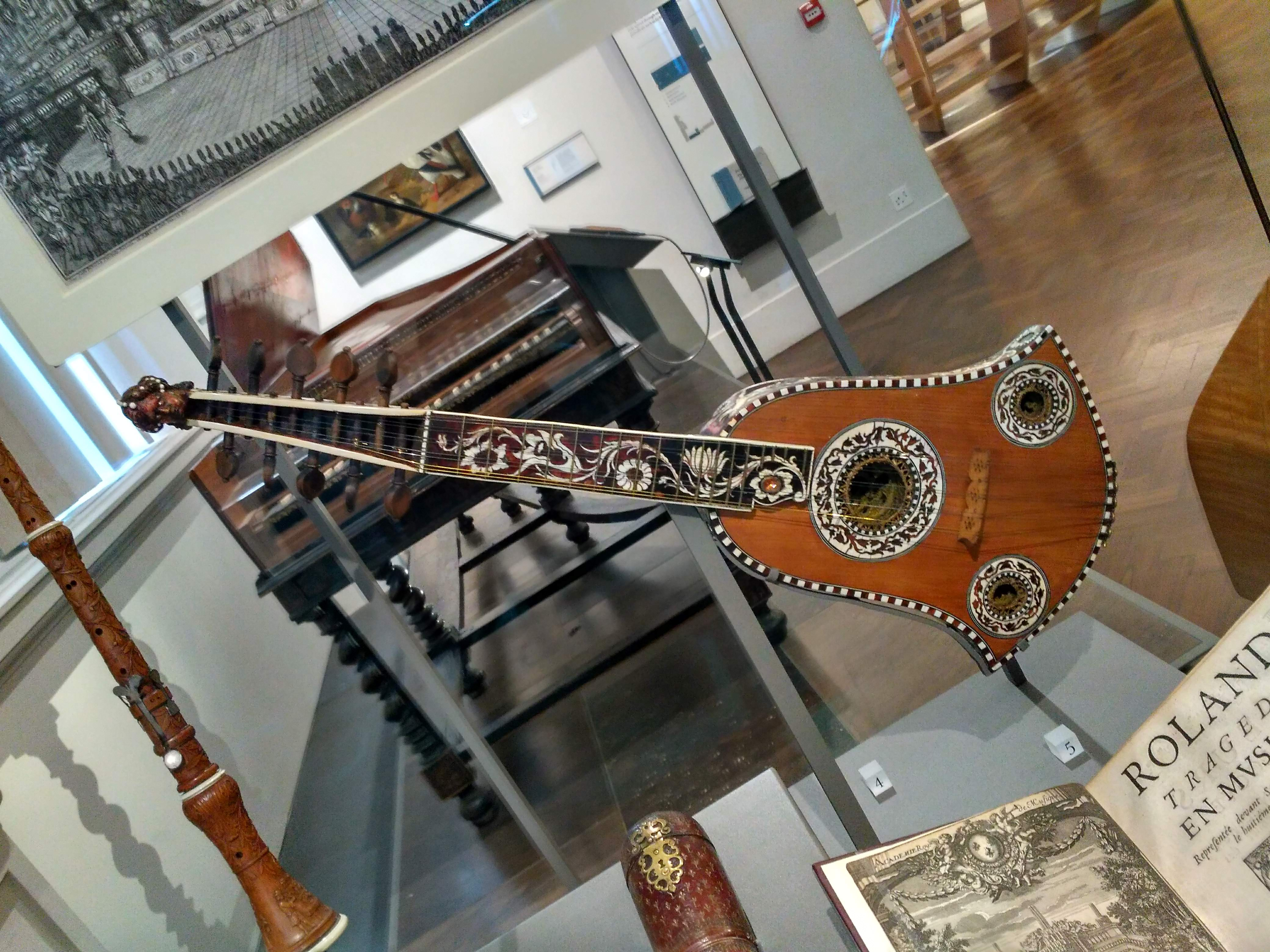
- Cithrinchen or Bell cittern by Joachim Tielke in the V&A Museum, London, UK.

String instrument
- Other names: Bell cittern, Citrinchen, Hamburger cithrinchen

Related instruments
- Cittern; Orpharion; English guitar; Portuguese guitar

The Cithrinchen or Bell cittern was a distinctively shaped instrument of the renaissance and baroque periods. It was usually strung with doubled courses of thin, light tension brass or steel strings. It usually had 3 soundholes (with decorative roses) and 5 (or sometimes 6 or more) courses (pairs) of strings. It was popular in Germany, England and Sweden.

Most such instruments built nowadays are reconstructions of historical instruments, or modern mandolin-type instruments which simply use the same body shape as the historical Cithrinchen.

== Gallery ==
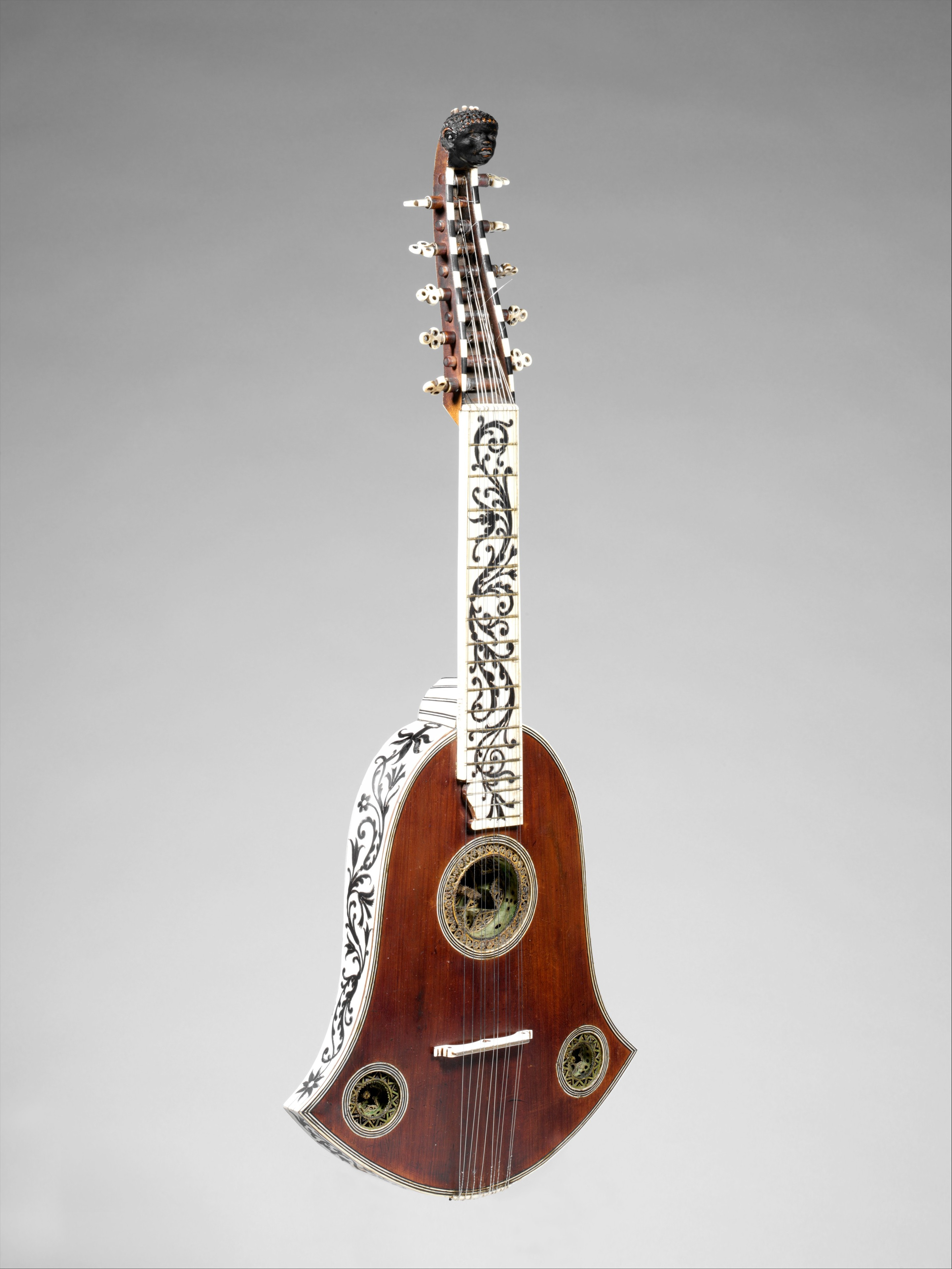
Cithrinchen in the Met Museum, New York, USA.

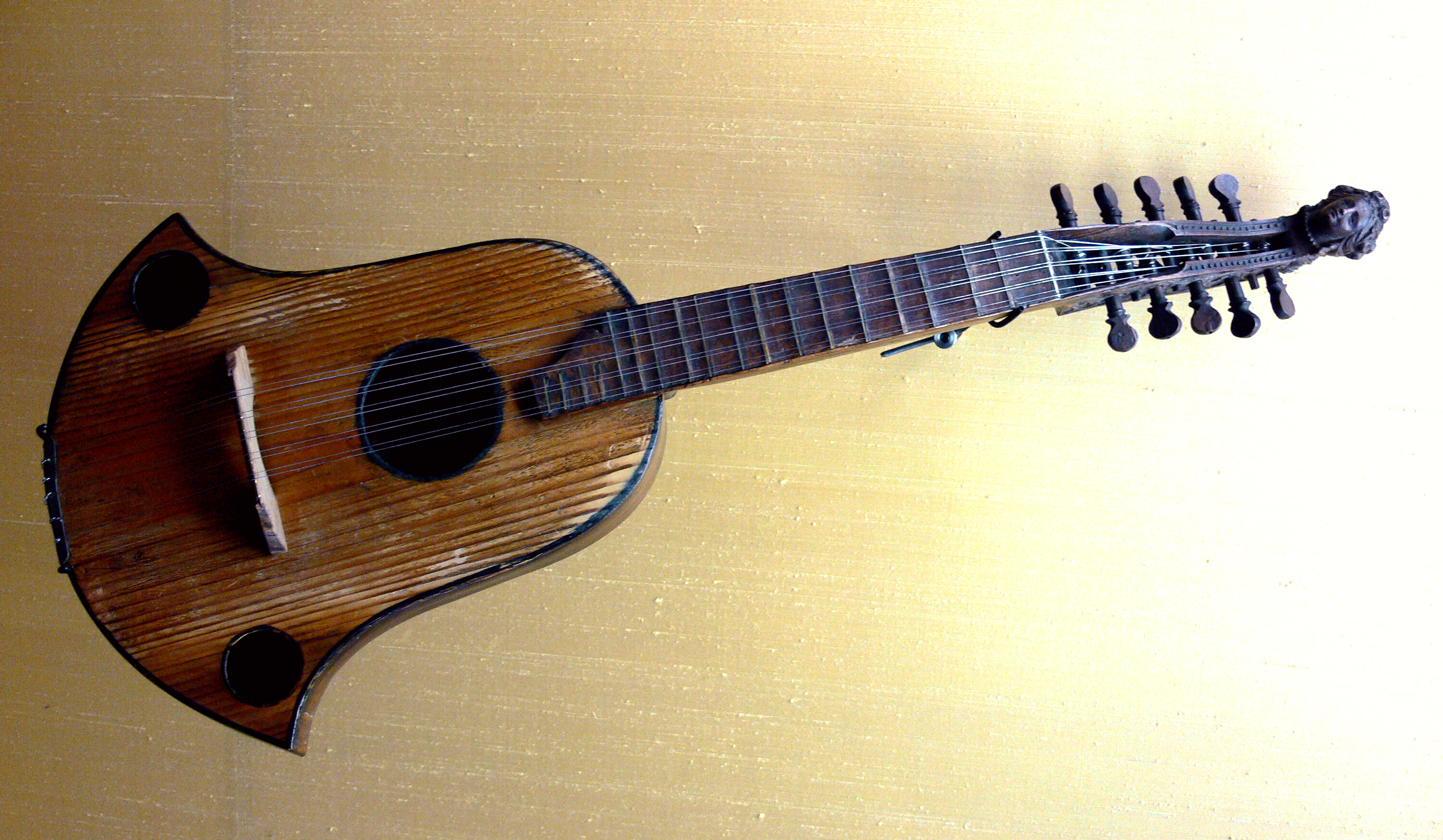
Cithrinchen in the Bayerisches Nationalmuseum, Munich, Germany

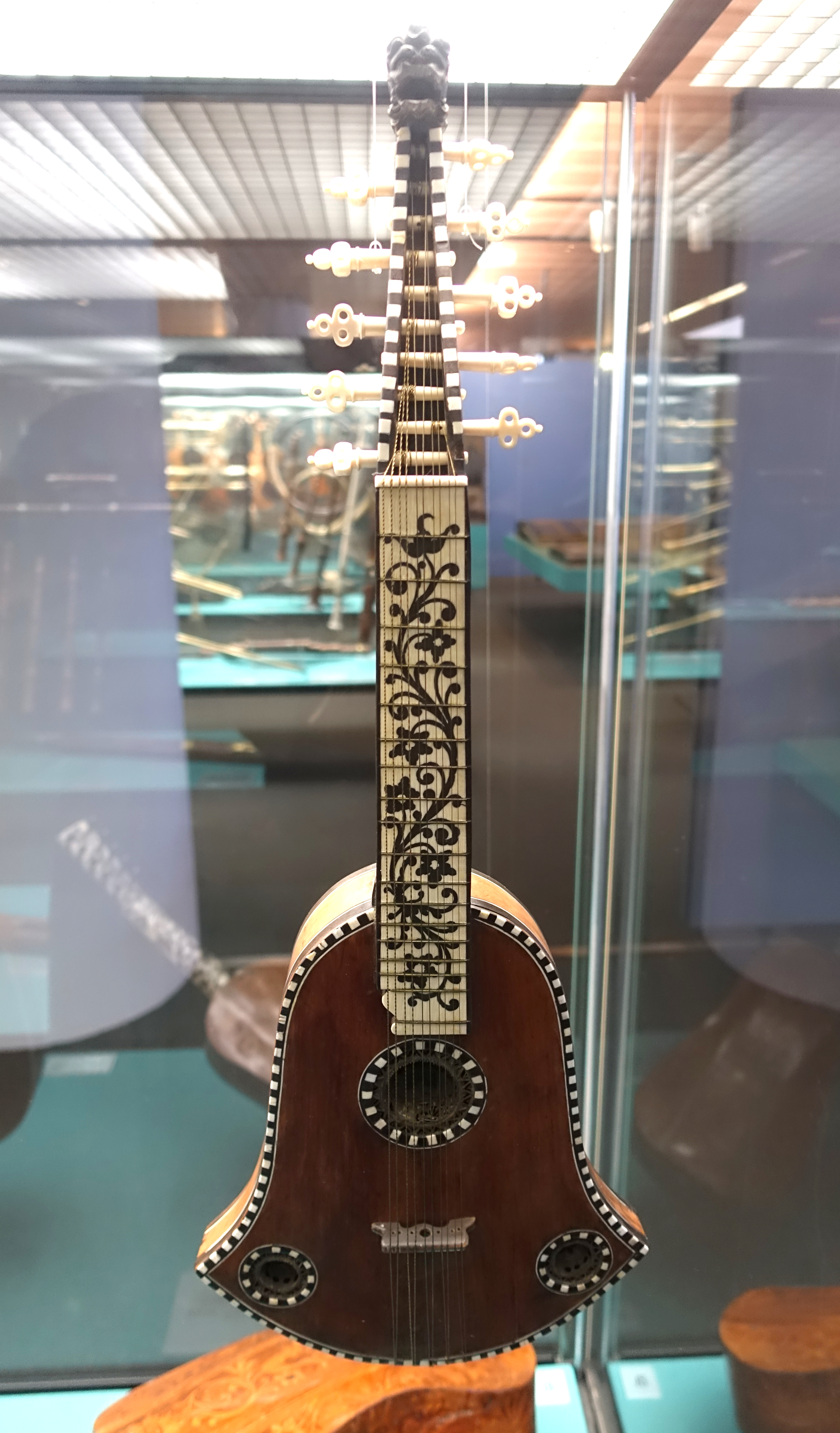
Cithrinchen in the Germanisches Nationalmuseum - Nuremberg, Germany, front view

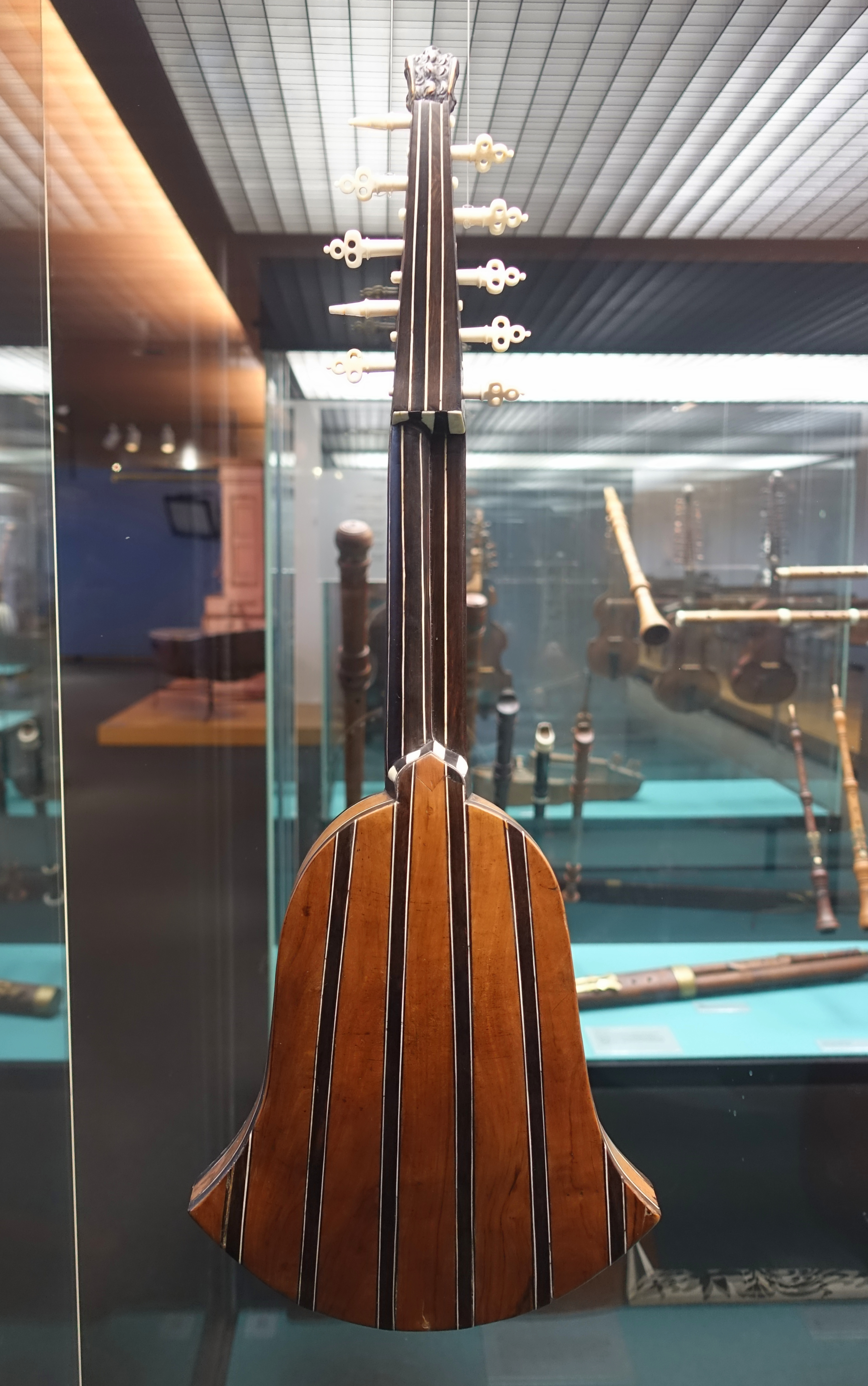
Cithrinchen in the Germanisches Nationalmuseum - Nuremberg, Germany, rear view
