= Alte Voce =

Corsican musical group

- Origin: Corsica
- Genres: World music; Polyphony; Music of Corsica
- Years active: 2000–present
- Members: Jean Mattei; Rosanna Cesari; Pasquale Cesari; Pierre Barthelemy; Laurent Menival; Bruno Vidal; Fanfan Cesari; François Quilichini; Christian Caporossi
- Website: altevoce.com

Alte Voce is a Corsican group, who sing Corsican music in the Corsican language.

== History ==
The band was founded in November 2000 by Jean Mattei and Rosanna Cesari. The group performs across France and in other countries of the world.

== Discography ==
- 2004 : Lingua materna
- Polyphonies
- Endemicu
- Issa Terra
- Di sale e di zuccheru
- 2010 : Petra Nostra
- 2012 : Amore Umanu Dernier opus
- 2019 : Isula Nostra
