= English guitar =

Musical instrument

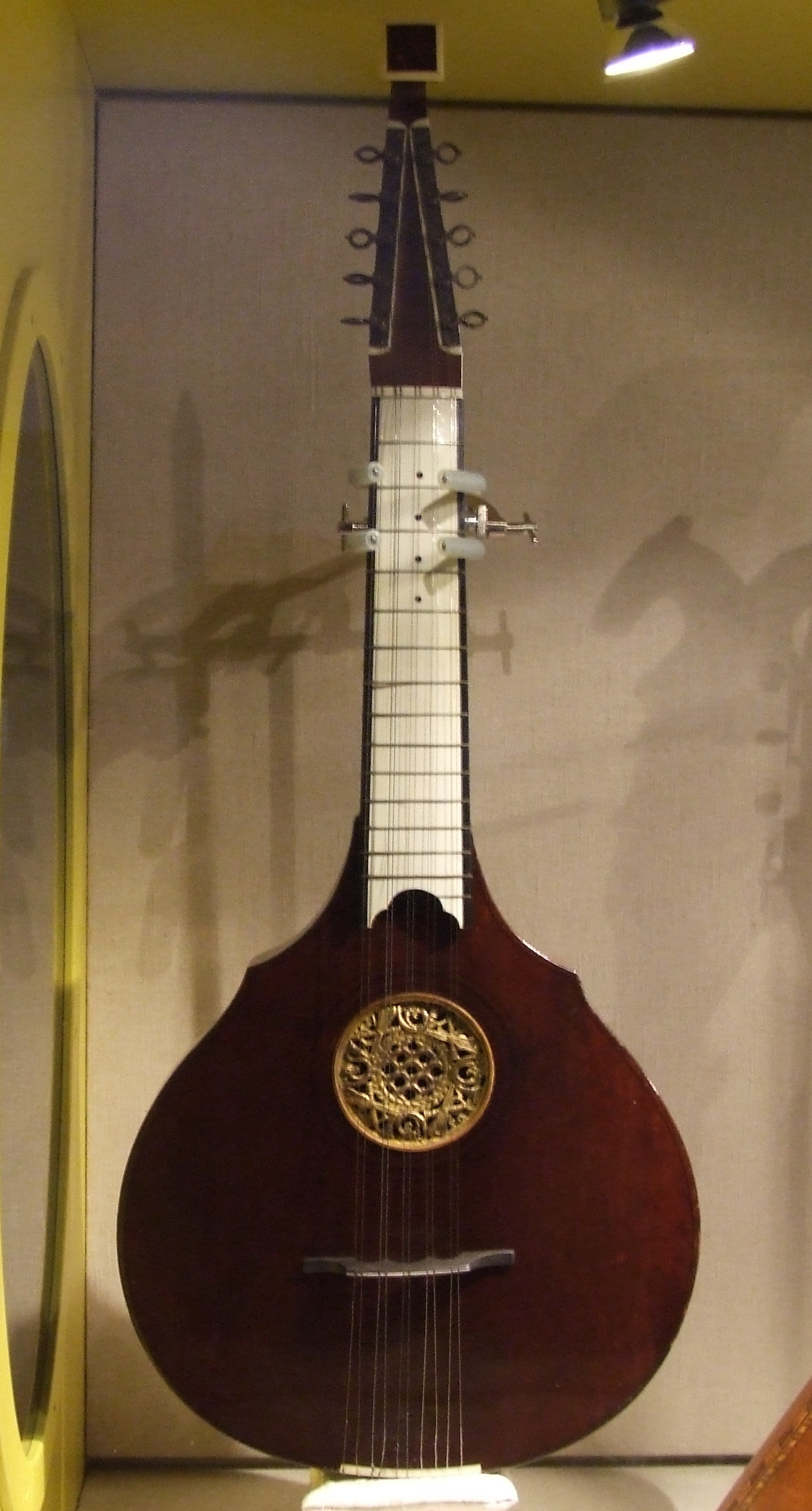
- English guitar made by William Gibson in 1772
- Classification: String instrument (plucked)
- Hornbostel–Sachs classification: 321.322 (necked box lute) (Chordophone with permanently attached resonator and neck, sounded by a plectrum)
- Developed: 18th century

Related instruments
- List: Modern descendants; Corsican Cetera; Portuguese guitar; Waldzither Bowed; Crwth; Guitar fiddle; Rebec; Vielle Plucked; Cetra; Cithara; Cittern; Cythara; Gittern; Guitar; Guitarra latina

The English guitar or guittar (also citra) is a stringed instrument – a type of cittern – popular in many places in Europe from around 1750–1850. It is unknown when the identifier "English" became connected to the instrument: at the time of its introduction to Great Britain, and during its period of popularity, it was apparently simply known as guitar or guittar. The instrument was also known in Norway as a guitarre and France as cistre or guitarre allemande (German guitar). There are many examples in Norwegian museums, like the Norsk Folkemuseum and in British ones, including the Victoria and Albert Museum. The English guitar has a pear-shaped body, a flat base, and a short neck. The instrument is also related to the Portuguese guitar and the German waldzither.

Early examples had tuning pegs (similar to a violin or lute), but many museum examples have what are commonly referred to now as Preston tuners, an innovation that appears closely linked with the instrument. In the 1760s J.N. Preston of London invented watch-key tuning, which was better suited to the instrument’s short metal strings than the original peg tuning. Dublin-made instruments of the 1760s often use the worm-gear tuning later adopted by the Spanish guitar.

The English guitar's popularity reflected the desire of the wealthy class to play a simple musical instrument. Burney recounted (in ‘Guitarra’, Rees's Cyclopaedia, 1802–19) how its vogue about 1765 was so great among all ranks of people as nearly to ruin the harpsichord makers; but Jacob Kirkman retrieved the situation by giving cheap guitars to milliner girls and street ballad singers, thereby shaming the richer ladies into returning to the harpsichord.

== Keyed English Guitar ==
This instrument helped those that found it hard to acquire the right-hand technique, during the 1770s a certain Smith patented a key-box housing six keys similar to those of a piano, which when depressed caused leather-covered hammers to strike down onto the strings. In 1783 Christian Claus of London patented a more sophisticated ‘keyed guitar’, whose mechanism was housed inside the sound box instead of being poised above the strings; the hammers struck upwards through holes in the soundhole rose. This type of instrument was called a ‘piano forte guitar’ by Longman & Broderip in 1787.

== Tuning ==
It usually had ten strings in a repetitive open C tuning, of which the highest eight are paired in four courses (doubled strings),

C E GG cc ee gg

in Helmholtz notation.

The English guitar may have influenced the development and tuning of the Russian guitar, which has seven strings tuned to open G in thirds (G_{⸜}–B, B–D, g–b, and b–d^{⸝}) with two in fourths (D_{⸜}–G_{⸜}, and D–g):

D_{⸜}, G_{⸜}, B, D, g, b, d^{⸝}.

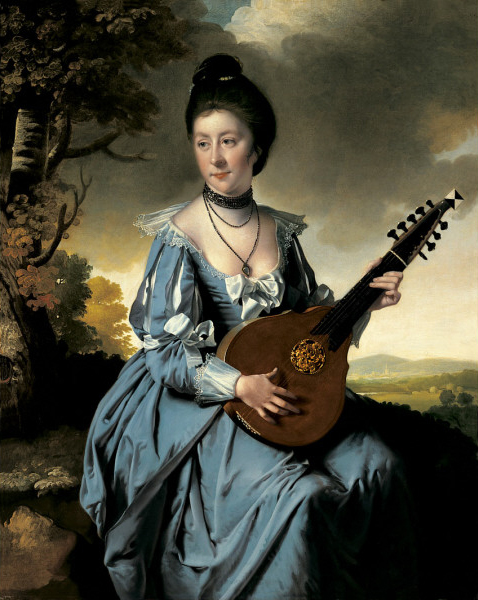
1766, England.Mrs. Robert Gwillym playing an English guitar, painting by Joseph Wright of Derby.

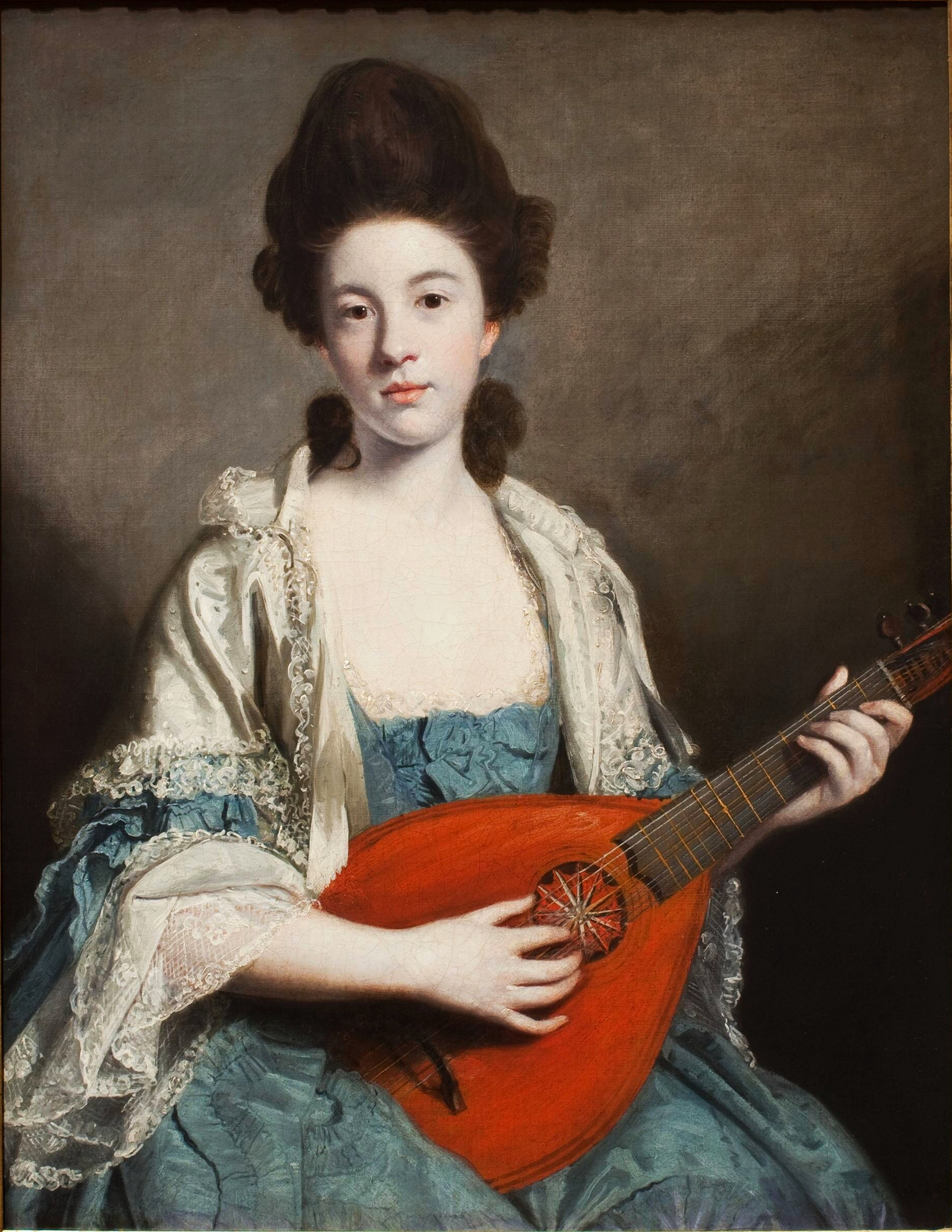
1762, England. Painting by Sir Joshua Reynolds of Mrs. Froude playing an English guitar or cittern.

== See also ==
- Citole
- Cittern
- Portuguese guitar
- Halszither
- Waldzither
