= Jean Dorst =

French ornithologist (1924–2001)

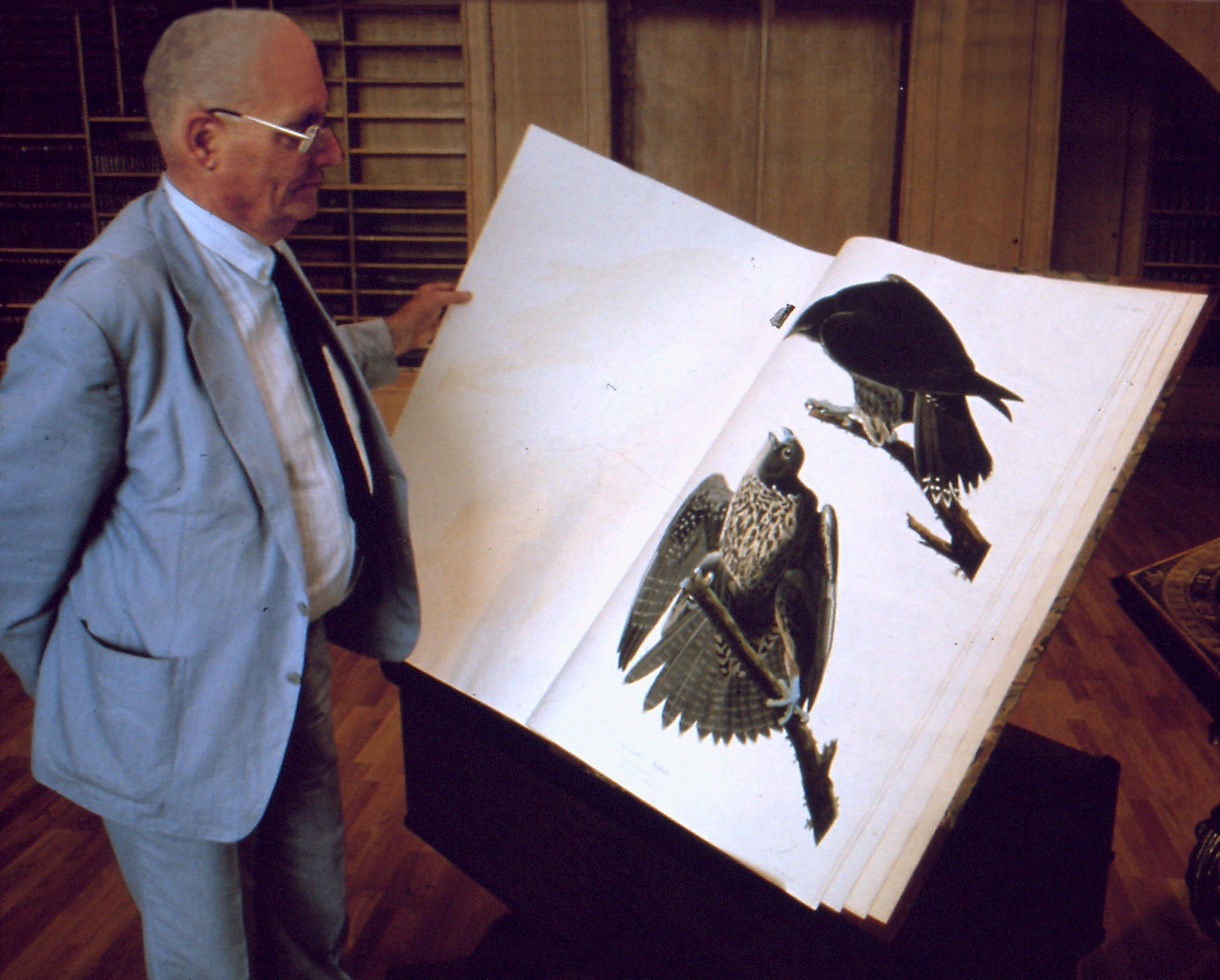
- Born: 7 August 1924; Mulhouse, France
- Died: 8 August 2001 (aged 77)
- Education: University of Paris
- Known for: Le Peuple Migrateur
- Awards: Académie des Sciences
- Scientific career
- Institutions: Muséum national d'Histoire naturelle

Jean Dorst (7 August 1924 – 8 August 2001) was a French ornithologist.

Dorst was born at Mulhouse and studied biology and paleontology at the Faculty of Biological Sciences of the University of Paris. In 1947 he joined the staff of the Muséum national d'Histoire naturelle. He succeeded Jacques Berlioz as chairman of Mammifères et Oiseaux in 1964, and was elected as director of the museum in 1975, resigning in 1985 to protest against government reforms of the museum.

Dorst was a member of the Académie des Sciences, one of the founders and second president of the Charles Darwin Foundation for the Galapagos, president of the 16th International Ornithological Congress (IOC), and vice president of the Commission of Protection of Threatened Species of the International Union for Conservation of Nature (IUCN).

Dorst was one of the writers of the documentary Le Peuple Migrateur (Winged Migration), and the film is dedicated to him. A companion volume of photographs and essays was published in 2003.

== Selected publications ==
- Les Migrations des oiseaux, 1956, Payot, "Petite bibliothèque", 1956, réédition 1962
  - The Migrations of Birds, 1962, Heinemann, trans. by Constance D. Sherman, with a foreword by Roger Tory Peterson
- Les Animaux voyageurs, 1964
- Avant que nature meure, 1965 (translated into 17 language)
  - Before Nature Dies, 1970, Collins, trans. by Constance Sherman
- L'Amérique du Sud et L'Amérique Centrale, 1969, Hachette
  - South American and Central America, 1967, Random House
- La Nature dé-naturée, Le Seuil, coll. "Points / Essais", 1970, 188 p. (abridged version of Avant que nature meure)
- Guide des mammifères d'Afrique : Des rats à trompe aux éléphants, illustré par Pierre Dandelot, Delachaux et Niestlé
- Les Oiseaux dans leur milieu, 1971, Éditions Rencontre, Lausanne, 383 p.
- La Vie des oiseaux, 2 tomes, 1971, Éditions Rencontre, Lausanne, 767 p.
  - The Life of Birds, 2 vols., 1974, Weidenfeld & Nicolson, London
- Action des pollutions sur les équilibres biologiques et sur l'homme- Tome 1 (Tract des jeunes Naturalistes, mars 1974) (www.jeunesnaturalistes.org).
- Action des pollutions sur les équilibres biologiques et sur l'homme- Tome 2 (Tract des jeunes Naturalistes, mars 1974) (www.jeunesnaturalistes.org).
- L'Univers de la vie, Paris, Imprimerie nationale, 1975
- La Force du vivant, 1979, Flammarion (Paris), 265 p. ISBN 2-08-064215-4
- Amazonnia, 1987
- Asia Sud-Oriental, 1987
  - Southeast Asia, 1992, Steck-Vaught (juvenile audience – description of wildlife, habitats, and ecological niches in SE Asia)
- Les Oiseaux ne sont pas tombés du ciel, J. P. De Monza, 1995, Rééd. 2001
- La Faune en péril, avec Gaëtan du Chatenet, Delachaux et Niestlé, 1998
- Et si on parlait de la vie ? – Propos d'un naturaliste, avec Sébastien Ripari, Maisonneuve et Larose, 1999
- Voyages – Trois siècles d'explorations naturalistes, avec Tony Rice et Patrice Leraut, Delachaux et Niestlé, 1999
- Dictionnaire de biologie, avec Jean-Louis Morère et Raymond Pujol, Frison Roche, 2002
- Le Peuple migrateur avec Jean-François Mongibeaux et Jacques Perrin, Le Seuil, 2002
