= Halszither =

String instrument
- Classification: String instrument
- Hornbostel–Sachs classification: 321.322 (necked box lute)
- Developed: Switzerland

The halszither (German for "neck zither" or "neck cittern") is a stringed instrument from Switzerland. It has nine steel strings in five courses and is tuned: G2, D3 D3, G3 G3, B3 B3, D4 D4.

== See also ==
- Cittern
- Waldzither
- Portuguese guitar
- English guitar
