= Joachim Tielke =

German musical instrument maker (1641–1719)

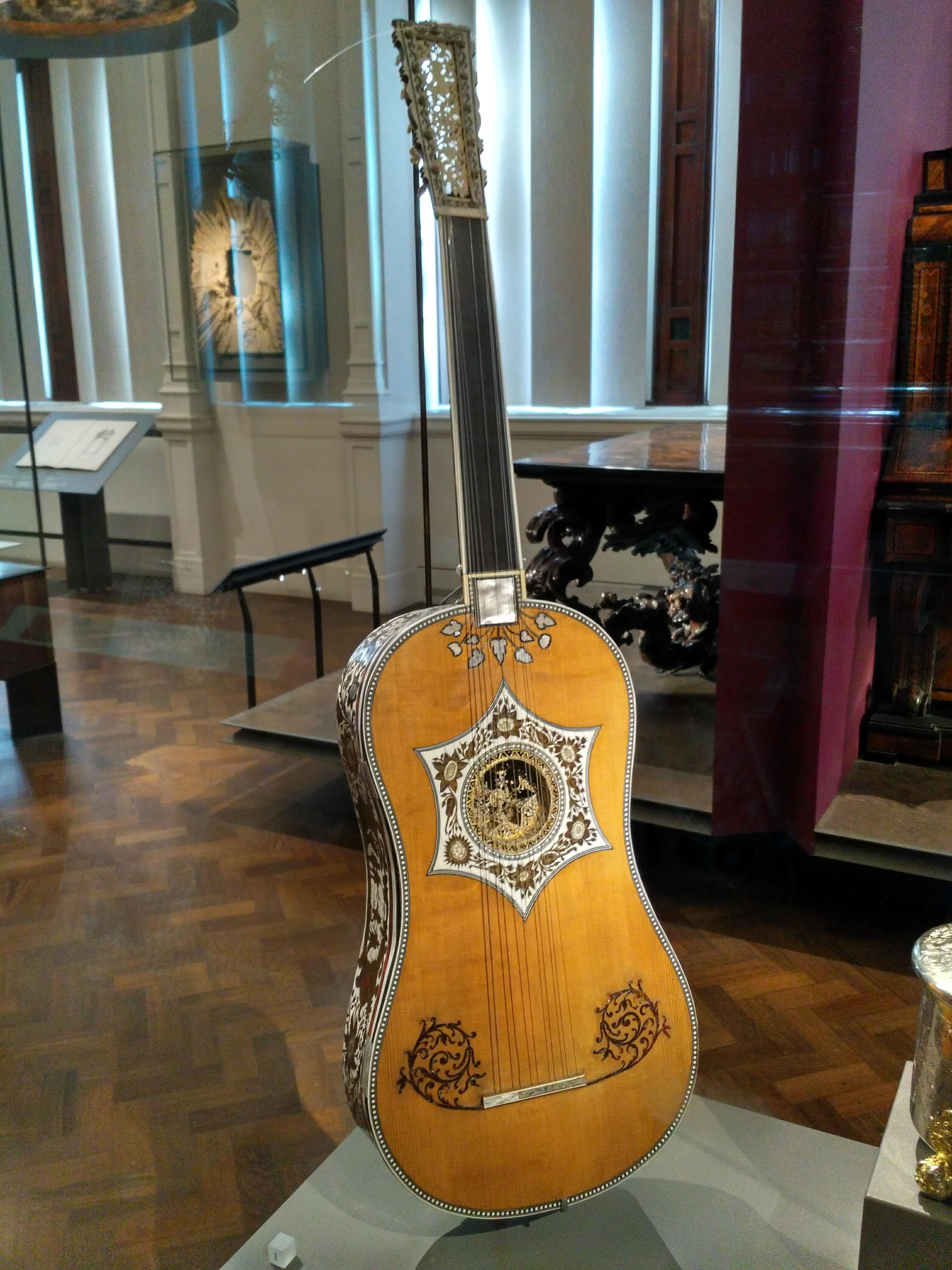
A baroque guitar by Joachim Tielke in the V&A Museum, London, UK.

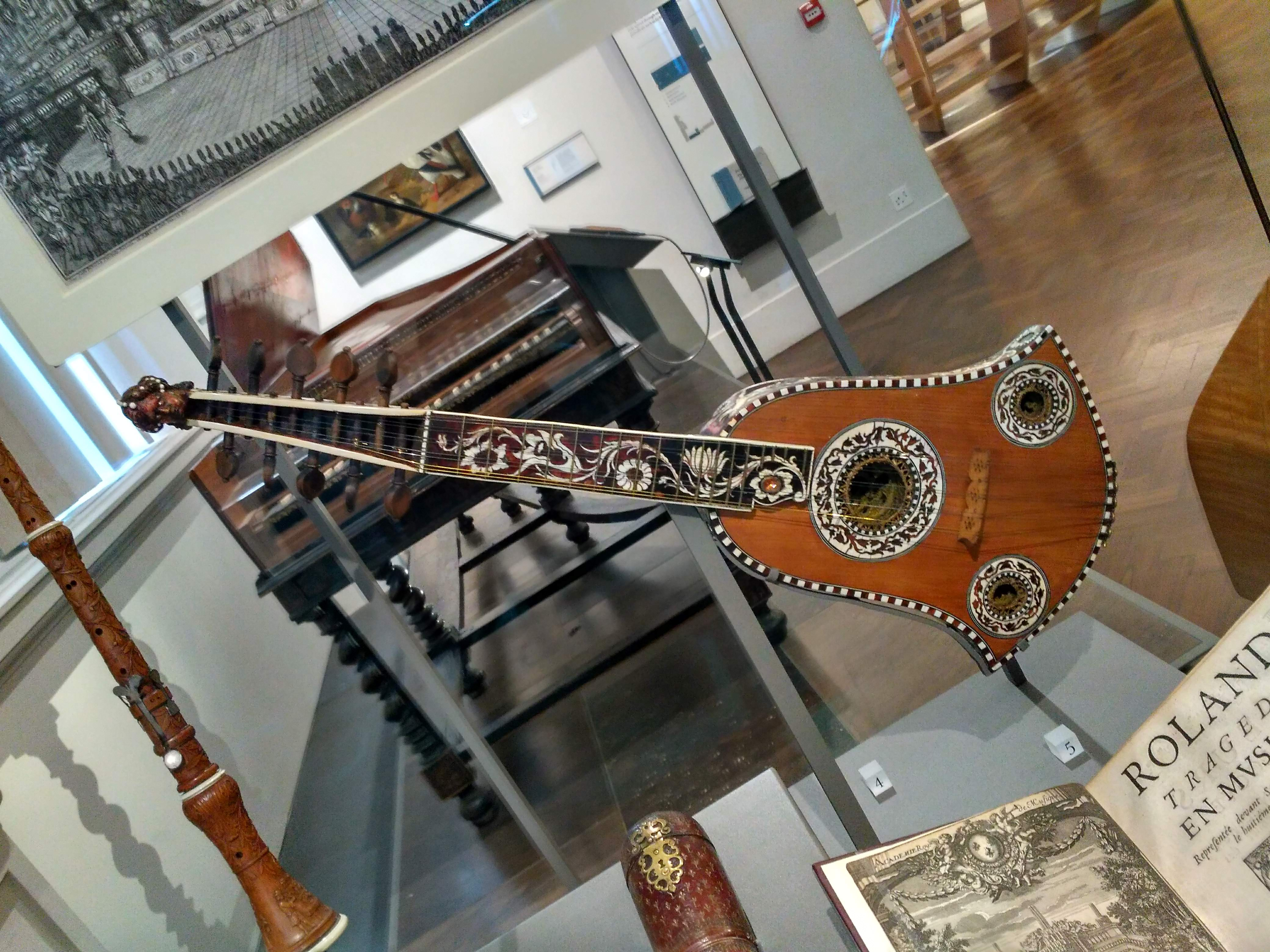
Bell cittern by Joachim Tielke in the V&A Museum, London, UK.

Joachim Tielke (14 October 1641 – 19 January 1719) was a German maker of musical instruments. He was born in Königsberg (now Kaliningrad), Duchy of Prussia a fief of Kingdom of Poland, and died in Hamburg.

A publication was dedicated to him by Günther Hellwig. Hellwig lists the total number of 139 instruments still existing of Tielke's oeuvre, with lutes, angelicas, theorboes, bell citterns (Ger Hamburger Cithrinchen), guitars, pochettes, violins, viole d'amore without sympathetic strings, barytons, viole da gamba, and bows. The publications of 2011 and 2020 omit few instruments and the bows as unauthentic, but new findings raise the total number of instruments and fragments from the Tielke workshop to 174.

More recent research shows that all theorboes were originally either lutes with bent-back pegboxes or are modifications of angelicas. The bows have shown to be non-authentic. On the other hand, nearly thirty instruments not known to Hellwig have come up, among them the fragment of a baryton, a cello, more viols, guitars, and lutes. Tielke's existing oeuvre is therefore one of the most comprehensive and by number close to that of Stradivari and the other great Italian makers. Tielke's instruments are famous not only for their marquetry and carved heards, but also for their tonal qualities.

A much-debated question is that of the contribution Tielke himself made to the instruments signed with his name. The examination of his work leads to the idea that he engaged outside craftsmen and artists for the supply of carvings and marquetry, possibly even complete instruments.

== Bibliography ==
- Friedemann and Barbara Hellwig, Joachim Tielke. Neue Funde zu Werk und Wirkung, Berlin/Munich 2020 (in German)
- Friedemann and Barbara Hellwig, Joachim Tielke. Kunstvolle Musikinstrumente des Barock, Berlin/Munich 2011 (in German, with an English summary)
- Günther Hellwig, Joachim Tielke: ein Hamburger Lauten- und Violenmacher der Barockzeit, Frankfurt/Main 1980
