= A Filetta =

Singing group in Corsica, France

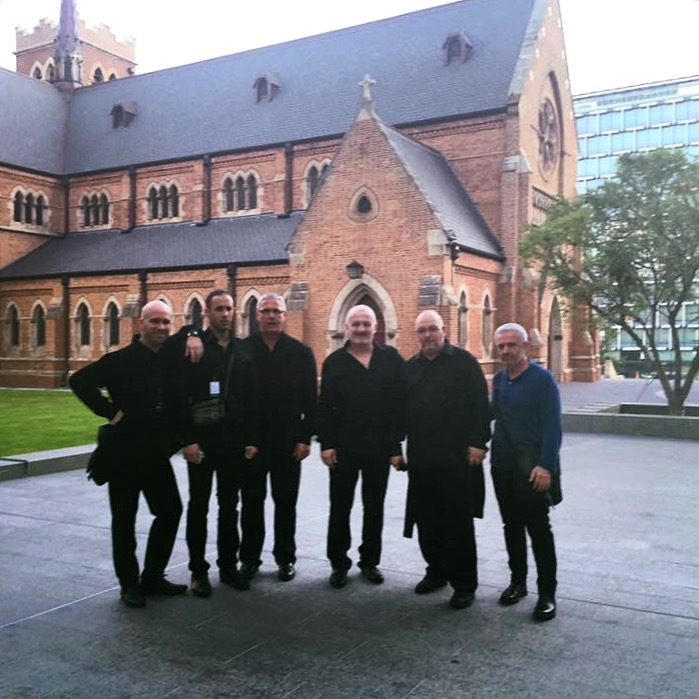

Background information
- Origin: Balagna, Corsica
- Genres: World music; Polyphony; Music of Corsica
- Years active: 1978–present
- Members: Jean-Claude Acquaviva, François Aragni, Petr'Antò Casta, Paul Giansily, Stéphane Serra, Maxime Vuillamier
- Past members: Michel Frassati, Jean Sicurani, Jean-Luc Geronimi, José Filippi, Stéphane Casalta, Dédé Nobili, Ceccè Acquaviva, Natale Ferricelli
- Website: afiletta.com

A Filetta (Corsican pronunciation: [a fiˈletta], lit. 'The Fern') is an all-male singing group that performs traditional music from Corsica. It is made up of Corsican singers who try to popularize the traditional Corsican polyphony singing style. To assert its Corsican identity, the group's name refers to a kind of fern that grows on the island.

== History ==
For over 45 years, A Filetta has been singing traditional polyphony but also innovate. They have recorded extensively and performed internationally. In 2009, they performed in France, Germany, Poland, Ireland, Brazil, in the Baltic States, Belgium, Italy, and Austria. The year 2010 brought them to Japan, Korea and the Réunion.

=== Beginnings of A Filetta ===
The group A Filetta was founded in October 1978 in Balagne by Michel Frassati, a young teacher, joined by Tumasgiu Nami, apiculturist. This association whose first objective was to contribute to the salvation of the Corsican oral heritage was linked to the Riacquistu mouvement. In 1981, the first album of A Filetta, Machja n'avemu un antra, is released. This first album will be followed by others, including one with children, (Sonnii Zitillini, 1987) and their first a cappella album, A' u visu di tanti (1989).

At the same time, A Filetta put a lot into cultural associations, including U Svegliu Calvese with which they launched in 1989 the first Rencontres de Chants Polyphoniques de Calvi: "A l'iniziu c'era a voce", now an established festival.

=== Members ===
The group is currently composed of 6 singers:

- Jean-Claude Acquaviva (since 1978);
- Paul Giansily (since 1983);
- Jean-Luc Geronimi (since 1994);
- Jean Sicurani (since 1978);
- Maxime Vuillamier (since 1989);
- Ceccè Acquaviva (since 2005).

== Discography ==
- 1981 : Machja n'avemu un altra
- 1982 : O'Vita
- 1984 : Cun tè
- 1987 : Sonnii Zitillini and In l'abbriu di e stagioni
- 1989 : A U VISU DI TANTI
- 1992 : AB'ETERNU (Diapason d'Or)
- 1994 : UNA TARRA CI HE (choc du monde de la musique)
- 1997 : PASSIONE (diapason d'or et choc du monde de la musique)
- 1998 : Soundtrack "Don Juan" by Jacques Weber
- 1999 : Soundtrack "Himalaya - l'enfance d'un chef" by Éric Valli
- 2000 : Soundtrack "Le libertin" by Jacques Weber
- 2000 : Participation at the soundtrack of "Comme un aimant" by Kamel Saleh and Akhenaton
- 2001 : Soundtrack "Le Peuple migrateur" by Jacques Perrin
- 2002 : INTANTU (Deda), reviewed as a "remarkable CD" by The Independent
- 2002 : DVD : "A FILETTA, voix corses" by Don Kent (Éditions Montparnasse)
- 2003 : SI DI MÈ
- 2005 : Soundtrack "Liberata" France 3
- 2006 : MEDEA
- 2008 : BRACANÀ (Deda/Harmonia Mundi distr.)
- 2009 : DVD "TRENT'ANNI POCU, TRENT'ANNI ASSAI" : a documentary by Cathy Rocchi and a concert at the Oratoire de Calvi, + bonus + a CD with songs. (Harmonia Mundi)
- 2011 : Mistico Mediterraneo with Paolo Fresu and Daniele di Bonaventura (ECM)
- 2011 : Di Corsica Riposu, Requiem pour deux regards with Daniele di Bonaventura
- 2013 : Puz/zle soundtrack for Sidi Larbi Cherkaoui's choreography with Fadia Tomb El-Hage, Kazunari Abe and Olga Wojciechowska (Eastman)
- 2015 : Castelli (Harmonia Mundi/World Village)

== Filmography ==
- 1995: A Filetta, en concert - Chants et Polyphonies de Corse (Olivi)
- 2002: A Filetta, voix corses (DVD) de Don Kent (Éditions Montparnasse)
- 2004 : A Filetta, Di Corsica Riposu d'Ange Leccia (Camera Lucida)
- 2009 : Trent'anni pocu, trent'anni assai (DVD), un documentaire de Cathy Rocchi et un concert à l'Oratoire de Calvi (Harmonia Mundi)

== Awards ==
- Grand Prix de l'académie Charles Cros (1995 et 2008)
- Diapason d'Or (1993, 1997)
- Choc du Monde de la Musique (1993, 1995, 1997)
- César de la meilleure musique de film pour "Himalaya l'Enfance d'un chef" (2000)

== Bibliography ==
"A Filetta - tradition et ouverture", by Jean-Claude Casanova - Colonna Editions, Ajaccio, 2009
