= Waldzither =

German style of cittern, a plucked string instrument

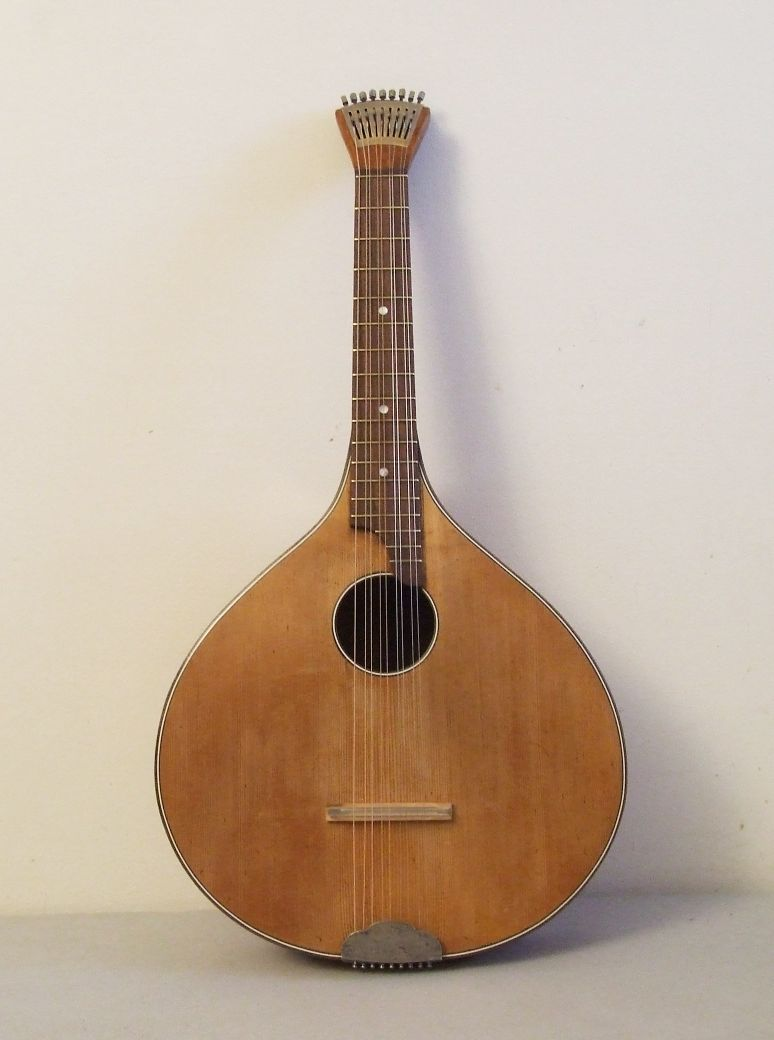
- Hamburg waldzither

String instrument
- Classification: String instrument
- Hornbostel–Sachs classification: 321.322 (necked box lute)
- Developed: Germany

The waldzither (German: "forest zither") is a plucked string instrument from Germany. It is a type of cittern that has nine (sometimes ten) steel strings in five courses. Different types of waldzither come in different tunings, which are generally open tunings as usual in citterns. The most Common Tuning for the Waldzither is Open C (C3, G3, C4, E4, G4) which is the same tuning as a Banjeaurine (or a 5 string Banjo with a Capo on the 5th fret) except that the 5th string is 2 Octaves lower than on the Banjeaurine.

It is one of the few instruments to stick to Preston tuners, another being the Portuguese guitar.

Producers of the waldzither attempted to establish it as a national instrument of Germany in the first half of the 20th century, when more complicated instruments were hard to get and to afford. Martin Luther was popularly said to have played a similar cittern at the Wartburg.

== Waldoline ==
When the lowest single course is omitted, it is sometimes called a waldoline, a portmanteau of waldzither and mandoline.

== See also ==
- Cittern
- Halszither
- Portuguese guitar
- English guitar
