= Winged Migration =

2001 documentary film by Jacques Cluzaud, Michel Debats and Jacques Perrin

- theatrical poster
- Directed by: Jacques Perrin; Jacques Cluzaud; Michel Debats
- Written by: Jean Dorst; Jacques Perrin
- Produced by: Christophe Barratier; Jacques Perrin
- Narrated by: Jacques Perrin; Philippe Labro
- Music by: Bruno Coulais
- Distributed by: BAC Films (France); Lucky Red (Italy); Kinowelt Filmverleih (Germany); Ascot Elite Entertainment Group (Switzerland)
- Release date: 12 December 2001 (France)
- Running time: 97 minutes
- Countries: France; Italy; Germany; Switzerland
- Languages: English; French
- Budget: $23.6 million
- Box office: $52.8 million

Winged Migration (French: Le Peuple Migrateur, also known as The Travelling Birds in some UK releases, or The Travelling Birds: An Adventure in Flight in Australia) is a 2001 documentary film directed by Jacques Cluzaud, Michel Debats and Jacques Perrin, who was also one of the writers and narrators, showcasing the immense journeys routinely made by birds during their migration.

The film is dedicated to the French ornithologist Jean Dorst.

== Plot ==
The film takes the viewer on a journey alongside many species of birds from the Old and New World.

It begins in Europe, following the end of winter on a riverbank, where European robins, cuckoos and kingfishers feed on the bounty of spring. A flock of greylag geese soon land and depart when a boy scares them off; one of the geese gets tangled in a net, but the boy manages to release it and it reunites with its flock as night falls.

After a flight where a Mallard briefly joins the flock of geese, the film shifts to showcase two other species, common cranes, seen arriving at a farm and accidentally spooked by an old woman, and white storks, which arrive to breed on the roofs of buildings. Barnacle geese are then followed on a flight across shorelines while whooper swans fly across Asia towards Japan. The film also showcases a group of Japanese cranes dancing in a mating ritual and a flock of Bar-headed geese escaping an avalanche in the Himalayas.

In North America, in the Grand Canyon, a bald eagle sees a flock of Canada geese fly north, with the flock landing to take a rest but soon spooked by a herd of wild horses, accidentally causing one to get lost. Clark's grebes run in the water in synchrony to court before a group of American white pelicans arrive. Sandhill cranes arrive at a lake to spend the night before making their final flight north.

In a wetland, songbirds like the red-winged blackbird and yellow-headed blackbird sing, while in a field, combine harvesters reap the fruits of their labour, unaware that they are close to a quail's nest. The flock of Canada geese seen earlier flies over a farm, where a farm goose tries to follow with no success.

Greater sage-grouse fight for the right to mate, while snow geese make one final stretch to reach the Arctic Circle just in time for spring. The ice in the north thaws as glaciers begin to break. Arctic terns hunt for fish near the breaking zone while the flock of Barnacle geese turns around.

The tundra bursts with life as hatchlings of dozens of migratory species begin to hatch, from whooper swans and common loons to sandhill cranes, snowy owls, and snow geese, with one hatchling being chased by a parasitic jaeger for getting too close to its nest.

On the coasts of the Arctic Ocean, as summer reaches its peak, common eiders plunge into the water while puffins run the gauntlet of great skuas. Guillemots, kittiwakes and northern gannets feed and rear their young around the clock. The good times do not last for long, however, for as autumn arrives, food becomes scarce, and birds must now fly back south.

The flock of Barnacle geese once again flies the same route it came from, soaring over a stormy sea and having to land on a navy ship when the weather worsens. Meanwhile, the Canada and Snow geese fly through redwoods as winter beings to close in, running the gauntlet of hunters who kill some of the flock. A flock of red-breasted geese fly through a refinery; one member gets stuck in oil. The Greylag geese close in on their winter grounds, but the flock is ambushed by hunters, with the goose with the tangled net surviving the ordeal.

The Common cranes fly south, across the same farm where they were spooked earlier, but this time, they accept the food offered by the old woman. The White storks finish their migration at an oasis in the Sahara Desert. Other birds along the coastline, like wading birds, arrive to feed. Great white pelicans fly inland to a large wetland to feed in vast numbers alongside other birds like Black herons, white-faced whistling ducks and African darters.

The film then moves to the Amazon rainforest, where macaws survive the daily downpours of the jungle. A boat is shown with animals such as red-and-green macaws, equatorial sakis, and toucans being kept in wooden cages; one lucky hyacinth macaw, however, manages to escape and fly back into the wild. In the Andean mountains, Andean condors use the rocky walls to catch thermals to soar over the land in search of food.

The final stretch follows the Antarctic Ocean, where on the Falkland Islands, rockhopper penguins and black-browed albatrosses come to breed every year. On other Antarctic islands, king penguins assemble in large flocks to breed, reducing but not eradicating the threat of predators, as a group of giant petrels catch and kill one hatchling. On another corner of the island, male wandering albatrosses display their enormous wings to females as part of their mating ritual.

The birds soon fly into the sea to feed, with a flock of king penguins heading to the sea. The arctic terns fly back north, as the good weather in the north returns, while back in Europe, spring arrives at the riverbank once again. The Eurasian robin and the boy from the beginning of the film witness the flock of greylag geese, including the one with the tangled net, stop momentarily before continuing their flight north once again.

== Production ==
The movie was shot over the course of three years on all seven continents. Filming began in July 1998 and ended in spring 2001. Most of the footage is aerial, shot using in-flight cameras from ultralights, paragliders, and hot air balloons, with additional footage captured from trucks, motorcycles, motorboats, remote-controlled robots, and a French Navy warship.

The viewer appears to be flying alongside birds of successive species, with many shots of Canada geese. They traverse every kind of weather and landscape, covering vast distances in a flight for survival. The filmmakers exposed over 950 km (590 mi) of film to create an 89-minute piece. In one case, two months of filming in one location was edited down to less than one minute in the final film.

Much of the aerial footage was taken of "tame" birds. The filmmakers raised birds of several species, including storks and pelicans, from birth. The newborn birds imprinted on staff members, and were trained to fly along with the film crews. The birds were also exposed to the film equipment over the course of their lives to ensure that the birds would not be unsettled by it. Several of these species had never been imprinted before.

Its producer says that Winged Migration is neither a documentary nor fiction, but rather a "natural tale".

The film states that no special effects were used in the filming of the birds, although some entirely CGI segments that view Earth from outer space and include animated birds augment the real-life footage.

The film's soundtrack by Bruno Coulais was recorded by Bulgarian vocal group Bulgarka Junior Quartet in Bulgarian, as well as Nick Cave in English and Robert Wyatt. The vocal effects include sequences in which panting is superimposed on wingbeats to give the effect that the viewer is right alongside a bird.

== Release ==
The film was released in France on 12 December 2001, in Japan on 5 April 2003 (Tokyo), the US on 5 April 2003 (Philadelphia International Film Festival), and the UK on 5 September 2003.

== Reception ==
Winged Migration had an overall approval rating of 95% on Rotten Tomatoes as of October 2021, based on 132 reviews, and an average rating of 8.2/10. The website's critical consensus states, "A marvel to watch". It also has a score of 82 out of 100 on Metacritic, based on 34 critics, indicating "universal acclaim". By gross ticket sales, the film still holds seventh place in nature documentaries and eighteenth in documentary overall.

== Awards and honors ==
The film was nominated for an Academy Award for Best Documentary Feature. It won "Best Editing" at the 27th César Awards, where it was also nominated for "Best Music" and "Best Debut".

- Oscar 2003: Best Documentary Feature (nominated) – Jacques Perrin
- European Film Award 2002: Best Documentary Feature (nominated) – Jacques Perrin
- CFCA Award 2004: Best Cinematography (nominated) – Laurent Charbonnier, Luc Drion, Laurent Fleutot, Sylvie Carcedo, Philippe Garguil, Olli Barbé, Dominique Gentil, Thierry Machado, Stéphane Martin, Fabrice Moindrot, Ernst Sasse, Thierry Thomas, Michel Terrasse
  - Best Documentary (nominated)
- Chicago Film Critics Circle Awards 2004: Best Cinematography (nominated) – Bernard Luti, Michel Benjamin
- César 2002: Best Editing (Meilleur montage) - Marie-Josèphe Yoyotte
  - Best First Work (Meilleure première oeuvre) (nominated) – Michel Debats, Jacques Cluzaud
- The European Film Award 2002: Best Documentary Award (Nominated) – Jacques Cluzaud, Michel Debats

== Images ==
One of the only two CGI shots in Winged Migration, in which an arctic tern flies above southern Africa

== TV mini-series ==
In 2002, a series based on the documentary named "Wings of nature" ("Les ailes de la nature" in French) was released, Directed by Jacques Cluzaud, this 3-episode mini series compiles some of the species shown in the documentary while also showing other species that were not initially featured. It is known that this series was released in Mexico on 25 July 2003.

Episode 1: Spring and Summer	Producers:	Jacques Cluzaud, Cristophe Barratier	Duration:	52 minutes
The series begins with a flock of Japanese cranes courting, as a few individuals reaffirm their long-term partners. Whooper swans begin their flight north across Japan, while in Europe, black grouse and great bustards display in leks to attract females, and white storks arrive to start breeding. In wetlands, Eurasian coots fight for territory before pairing up; other birds like mallards, great crested grebes, black-necked grebes, black-headed gulls, and kingfishers too begin to pair up and build their nests. Songbirds like reed warblers and European robins build their nests, and a great tit delimits its territory by singing. Meanwhile, in North America, greater sage-grouse fight for the right to mate while Clark's grebes pair in a more sophisticated manner. American white pelicans and Ross's geese arrive to feed, the latter fuelling up for the journey to the Arctic Circle, much like Sandhill cranes do as they make a pit stop in Canada. Other songbirds arrive for the summer, such as the Red-winged blackbird, the bobolink, the western meadowlark, the marsh wren, and the yellow-headed blackbird. In more secluded woodlands, the American goldfinch makes the thinnest branches its territory, while the northern house wren and the red-naped sapsucker make their nests inside holes in the trees. In their way north, a flock of snow geese refuels by feeding on a low tide shoreline before continuing their flight north. In the Arctic, the first arrivals begin to settle down and breed. Whooper swans and common loons are among the first to arrive, followed by greylag geese. Back in Europe, many chicks begin to hatch. The nest of the reed warbler has become parasitised by a cuckoo, which proceeds to rid itself of its competition. The nest of the European robins sees the hatching of five healthy chicks while the kingfisher goes hunting for food. In the Arctic, the snow geese finally arrive, while on another corner of the tundra, snowy owls and parasitic jaegers nest close to each other, sometimes causing conflict. For nesting birds like king eiders and red knot, their plumage serves for camouflage, while the brooding sandhill cranes have to endure the ever-annoying biting mosquitoes. On the coast, the common eider takes its brood into the water to feed and escape predators, while other birds, such as the arctic tern, opt to breed in colonies. reducing the danger of attack. They are some of the longest-distance voyagers to travel to the Arctic. As summer reaches its end, a northern wheatear begins to prepare to fly back south.
Episode 2: Autumn and Winter	Producer:	Jacques Cluzaud, Cristophe Barratier	Duration	52 minutes
Migratory birds around the globe begin their migration south as food becomes scarce and temperatures drop. Barnacle geese begin their migration across Iceland towards Scotland, while on another corner of the Arctic, wading birds such as avocets, dunlin, oystercatchers, Eurasian whimbrels, spotted redshanks, and sanderling moult and fuel up before flying south. In mainland North America, Canada geese and snow geese fly south in V formations, often being stranded by sudden weather changes like strong winds and snowfall. The bad weather can catch up with those falling behind, so many of these migratory birds have to, at times, brave the strong winds to catch up, and refueling becomes more difficult upon sudden snowfall. On the coastline, stilt sandpipers gather in large flocks, the young learning to stick together to defend themselves, while in the wetlands, sandhill cranes reunite in previous migratory stops before they continue their flight south. Migratory birds in mainland Europe face a lack of food as their biggest challenge, and many will fly as far south as Africa as their winter grounds. Sand martins gather in flocks to prepare for such a journey, chattering together to keep close. Other birds, however, seek refuge in lower parts of Europe; greylag geese make a stop in France before flying west to Spain to hold out for the winter, while common cranes make a stop to refuel and fly further south. A few of these flocks, however, remain in France, where, thanks to human intervention, they have taken advantage of a controlled wetland and gorge themselves there during winter. Human intervention can cause problems and opportunities for migratory birds. In the Pyrenees mountains, collared doves face nets raised by hunters, while in other cities, white storks take advantage of human waste to seek food and fuel up before crossing the Mediterranean and into the Sahara Desert. The African continent is the final stop for many of the Old World migratory birds. Along the coastlines, thousands of wading birds, terns, and greater flamingos arrive to feed in the outgoing tides, while the usual residents, great white pelicans, fly inland to take advantage of flooded plains in Senegal, where they can satisfy their appetites. Many other species of freshwater birds take advantage of such an overabundance of fish brought by floods; the white-breasted cormorant and the African darter dive beneath the water to chase their prey, while black herons use their wings to lure prey into their makeshift covers. Glossy ibis wade around the reeds, catching anything they spot, while white-faced whistling ducks prefer to stick in large flocks to feed. Away from the wetlands, other African birds feed after arriving from their migration. European turtle doves and barn swallows feed on seeds and insects brought by the rains, while other, more local birds have to take advantage of food where they can. Ground hornbills, ostriches, and others are among those that know how to endure the dry seasons and reap the benefits of the rainy season. Lesser flamingos are more specialised, feeding in algae in toxic lakes en masse, some succumbing to botulism. Artificial wetlands in India are the home of other freshwater birds, yet the Keoladeo National Park was once a place of hunting, where around 10,000 birds met their end. Now, a protected area, black-faced spoonbills, herons, bar-headed geese, and sarus cranes find a paradise amidst a human-changing world.
Episode 3: Seabirds	Producer:	Jacques Cluzaud, Cristophe Barratier	Duration	52 minutes
Birds that live in the sea face different challenges from those that live on land, yet the struggle of migration and breeding is the same. In the Northern Atlantic, thousands of Atlantic puffins, northern gannets, common guillemots, and kittiwakes arrive to breed in rocky cliffs, each with a different way to nest, but all breeding in large colonies. Puffins burrow nests while catching multiple fish in a single trip, and gannets breed in monogamous pairs, often renewing their bond each year. Breeding does not come without challenges; thieves such as parasitic jaegers and great skuas often harass and, at times, kill the returning seabirds. For each parent, gathering enough food to feed their young is a race against time. Between each trip, these birds can bring from one fish to many at a time, often making multiple journeys in a day thanks to the longer days of summer. The guillemots and puffins dive beneath the water once they land, while the gannets dive from great heights to catch their food. By the end of the breeding season, many of these birds will have grown enough to make the journey into the open sea to hunt for themselves. Guillemot chicks often jump towards the sea from the great heights that saw them raised, while gannets use the strong winds to take off. In the southern region of our world, other kinds of seabirds wander around the ocean. In South Georgia, wandering albatross reunite each year to re-establish their bonds or find a partner for the first time. In the Falkland Islands, rockhopper penguins, black-browed albatross, and imperial shags return each year to breed together in large colonies; their nests often being targets of hungry striated caracaras and brown skuas, while the penguins face sea lions on their way out to the open ocean. Back in South Georgia, sooty albatross court in mid-air, pairs often flying close together to seal their bond, while on the beaches of Crozet Island, king penguins breed together, taking advantage of the island's rich seas to nest and raise their chicks all year round. Like in the Falklands, the large colonies attract the attention of predators such as southern giant petrels.

== See also ==
- Human-guided migration
- Bill Lishman – imprinted geese for aerial filming
- List of films with longest production time
