= Roland Ferrandi =

Roland Ferrandi (French pronunciation: [ʁɔlɑ̃ fɛʁɑ̃di]; also Orlandu Ferrandi; born in 1958) is a Corsican composer-ceterist, lutenist and theorbist.
