= Cittern =

Plucked string instrument

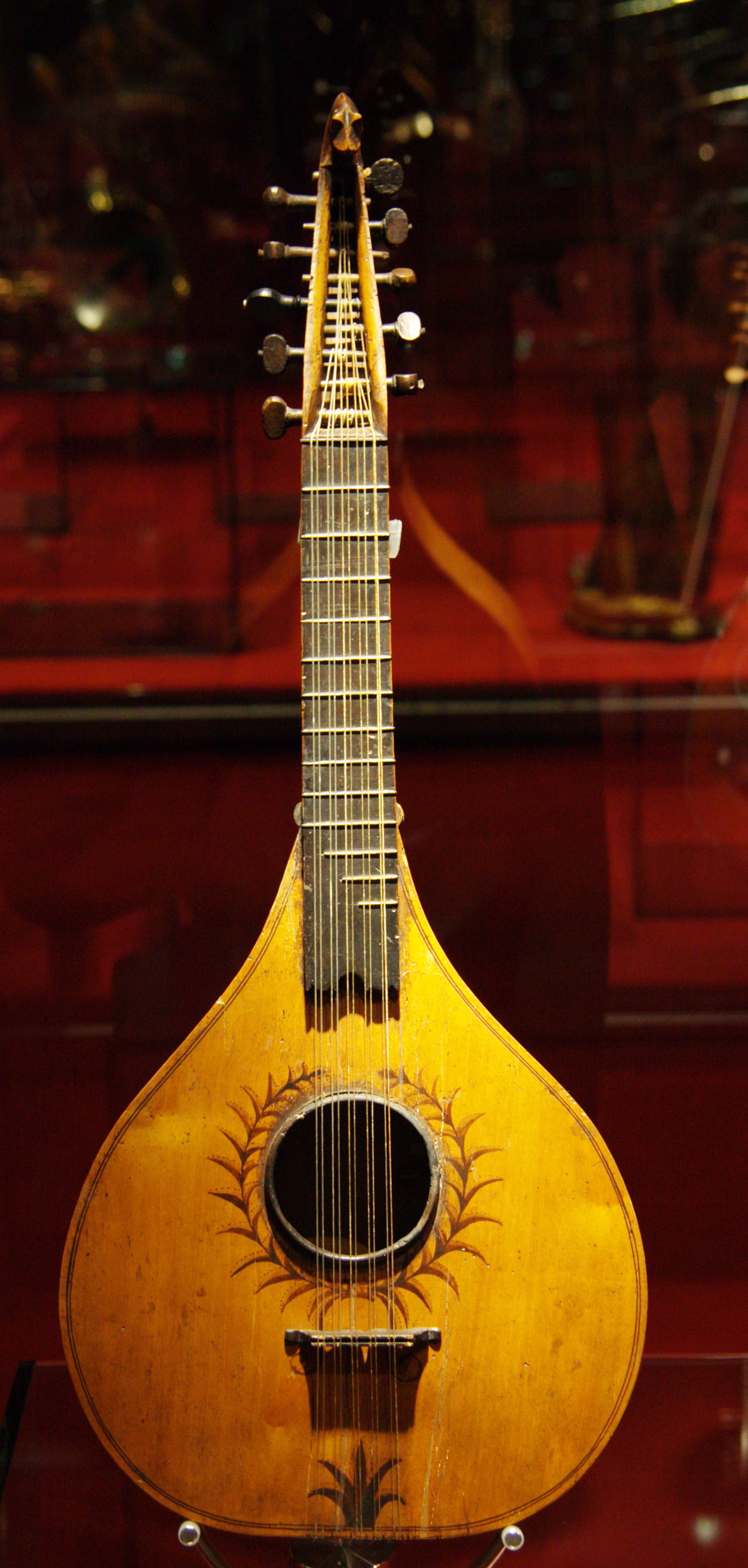
- Cittern exhibited at the Music Museum of Barcelona
- Other names: Fr. cistre, It. cetra, Ger. Cister, Zister, Sp. cistro, cedra, cítola
- Classification: String instrument (plucked)
- Hornbostel–Sachs classification: 321.322-5 (necked box lute, plucked with fingers)
- Developed: 16th century

Related instruments
- List: Cetra; Citole; Ceterone; English guitar; Portuguese guitar; Halszither; Waldzither; Zither

The cittern or cithren (Fr. cistre, It. cetra, Ger. Cister, Sp. cistro, cedra, cítola) is a stringed instrument dating from the Renaissance. Modern scholars debate its exact history, but it is generally accepted that it is descended from the medieval citole (or cytole). Its flat-back design was simpler and cheaper to construct than the lute. It was also easier to play, smaller, less delicate and more portable. Played by people of all social classes, the cittern was a popular instrument of casual music-making much like the guitar is today.

== History ==
=== Pre-modern citterns ===
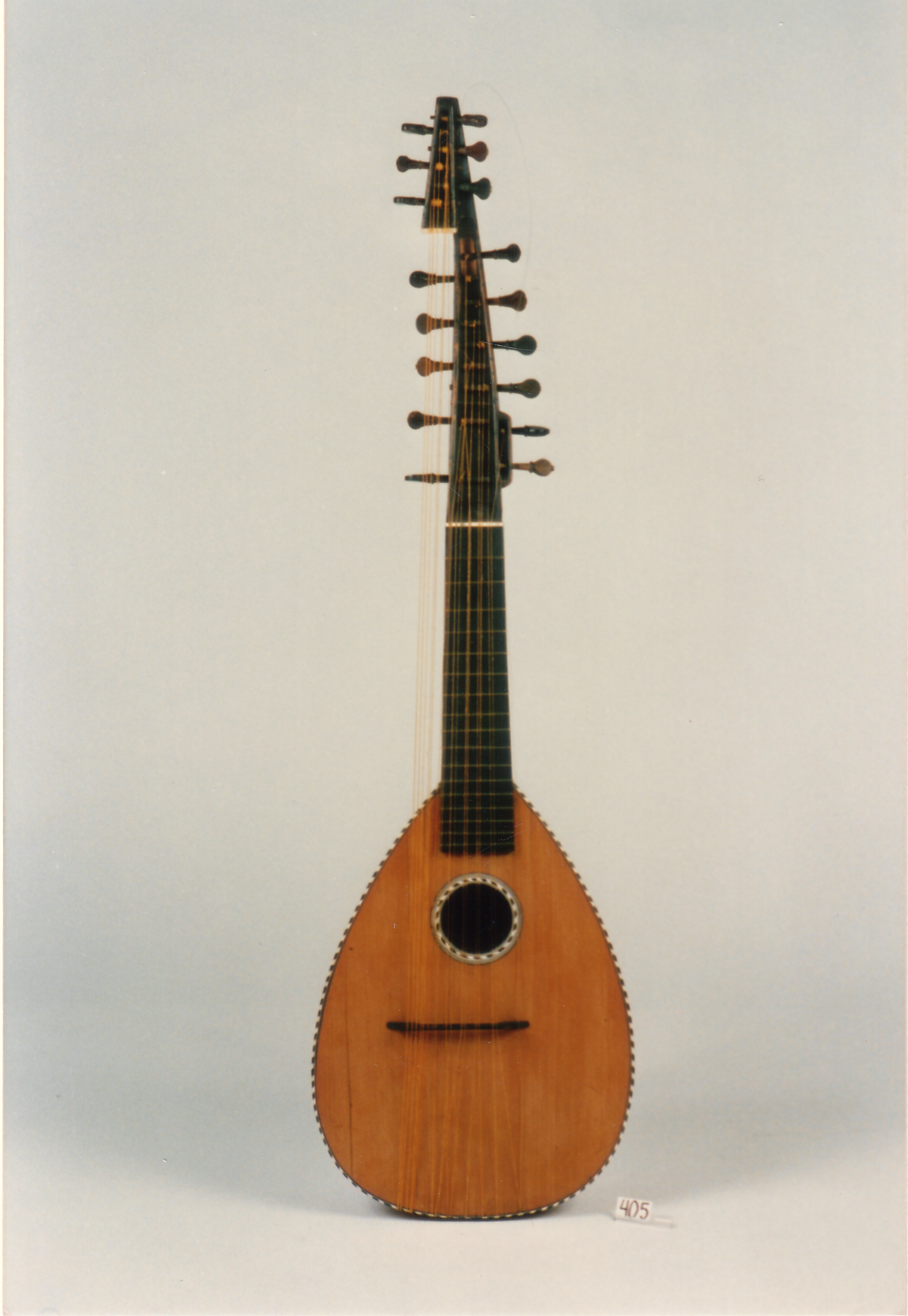
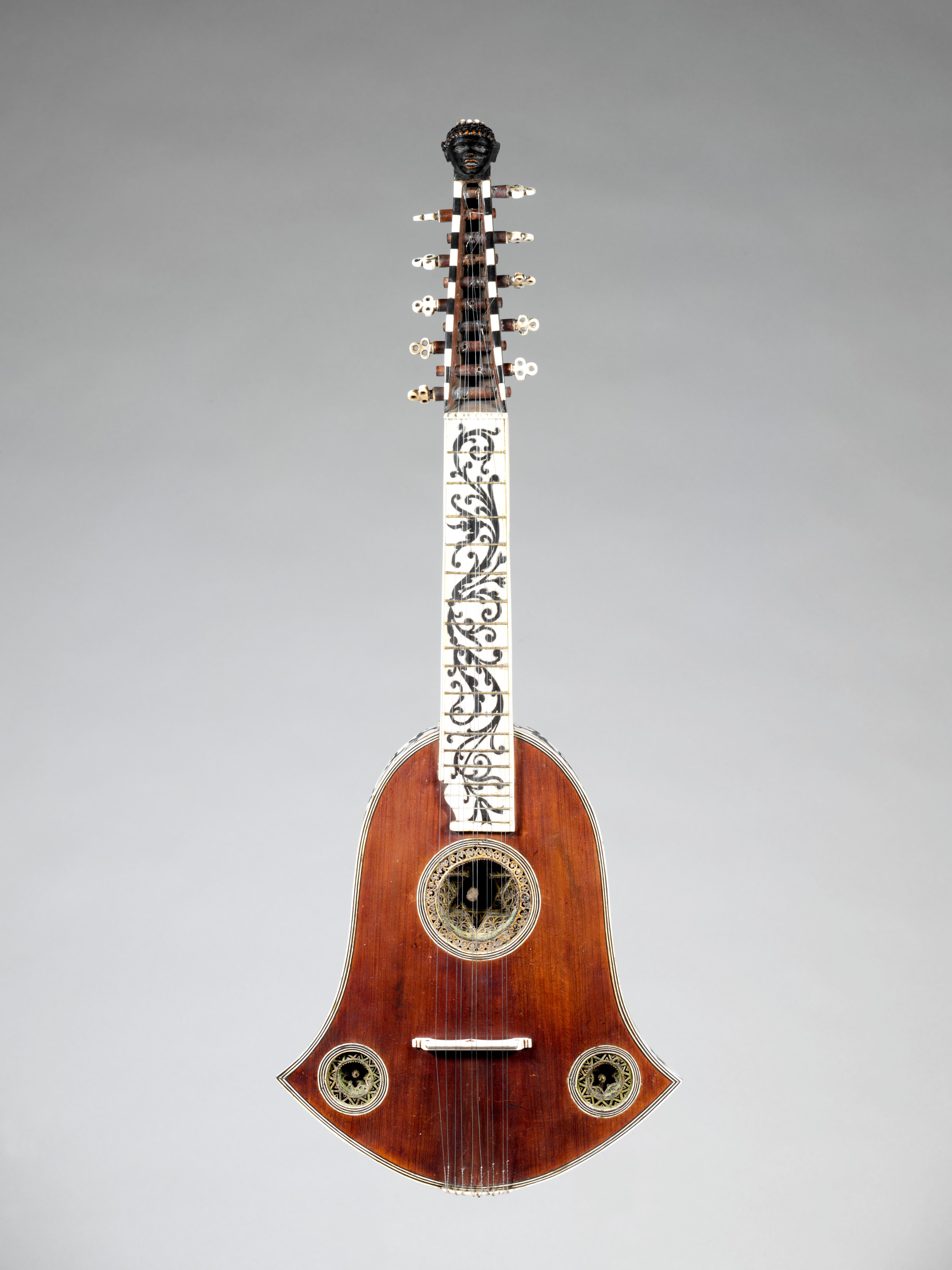
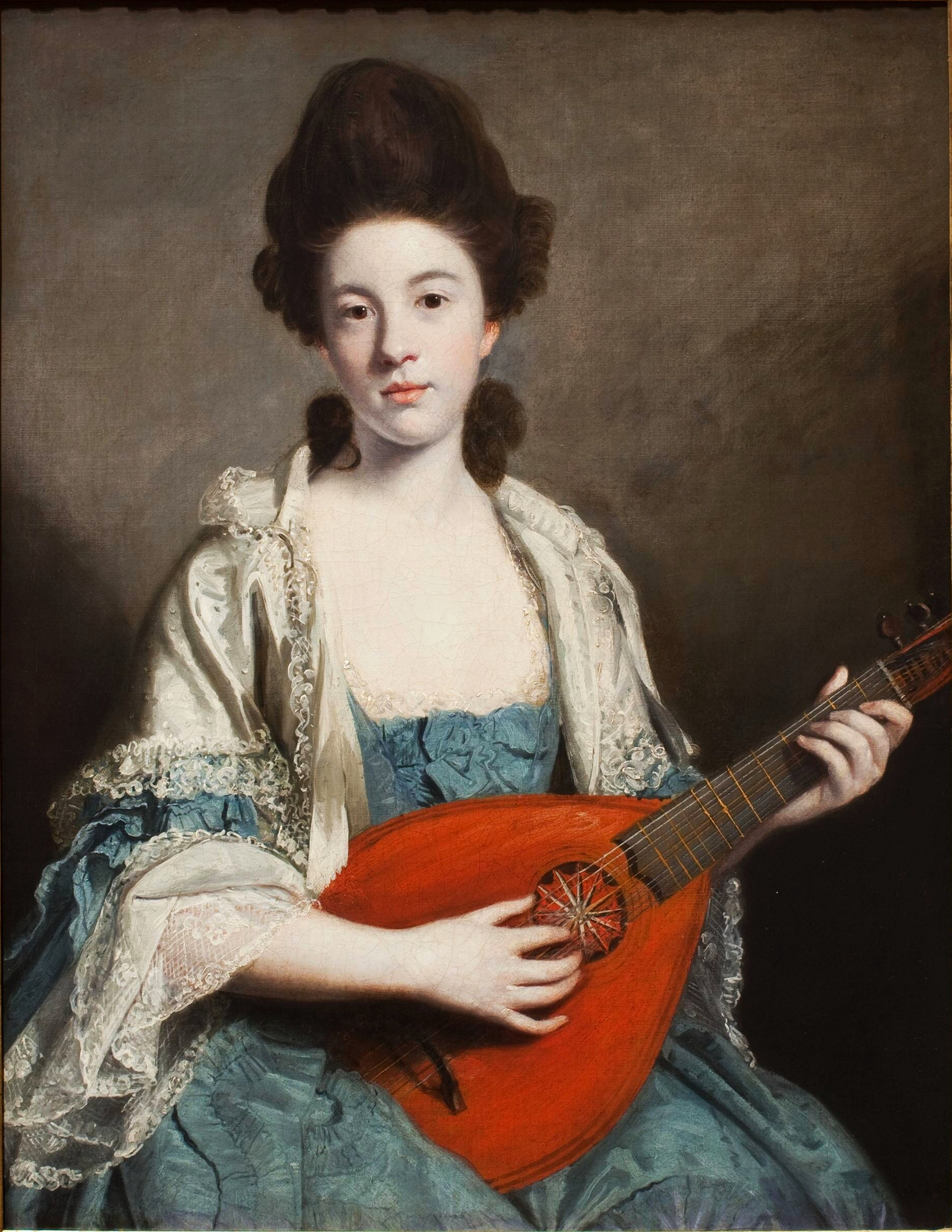
From left to right, 1: Archicitter, Laurent, Louis-Sigismond, c. 1774–89; 2: Bell cittern by Joachim Tielke, c. 1865; 3: Painting by Sir Joshua Reynolds of Mrs. Froude playing an English guitar or cittern, 1762

The cittern is one of the few metal-strung instruments known from the Renaissance music period (others being gut-strung). It generally has four courses of strings (single, pairs or threes depending on design or regional variation), one or more courses being usually tuned in octaves, though instruments with more or fewer courses were made. The cittern may have a range of only an octave between its lowest and highest strings and employs a re-entrant tuning – a tuning in which the string that is physically uppermost is not the lowest, as is also the case with the five-string banjo and most ukuleles for example. The tuning and narrow range allow the player a number of simple chord shapes useful for both simple song accompaniment and dances, though much more complex music was also written for it. Its bright and cheerful timbre make it a valuable counterpoint to gut-strung instruments. The Spanish bandurria, still used today, is a similar instrument.

=== 16th to 18th centuries ===
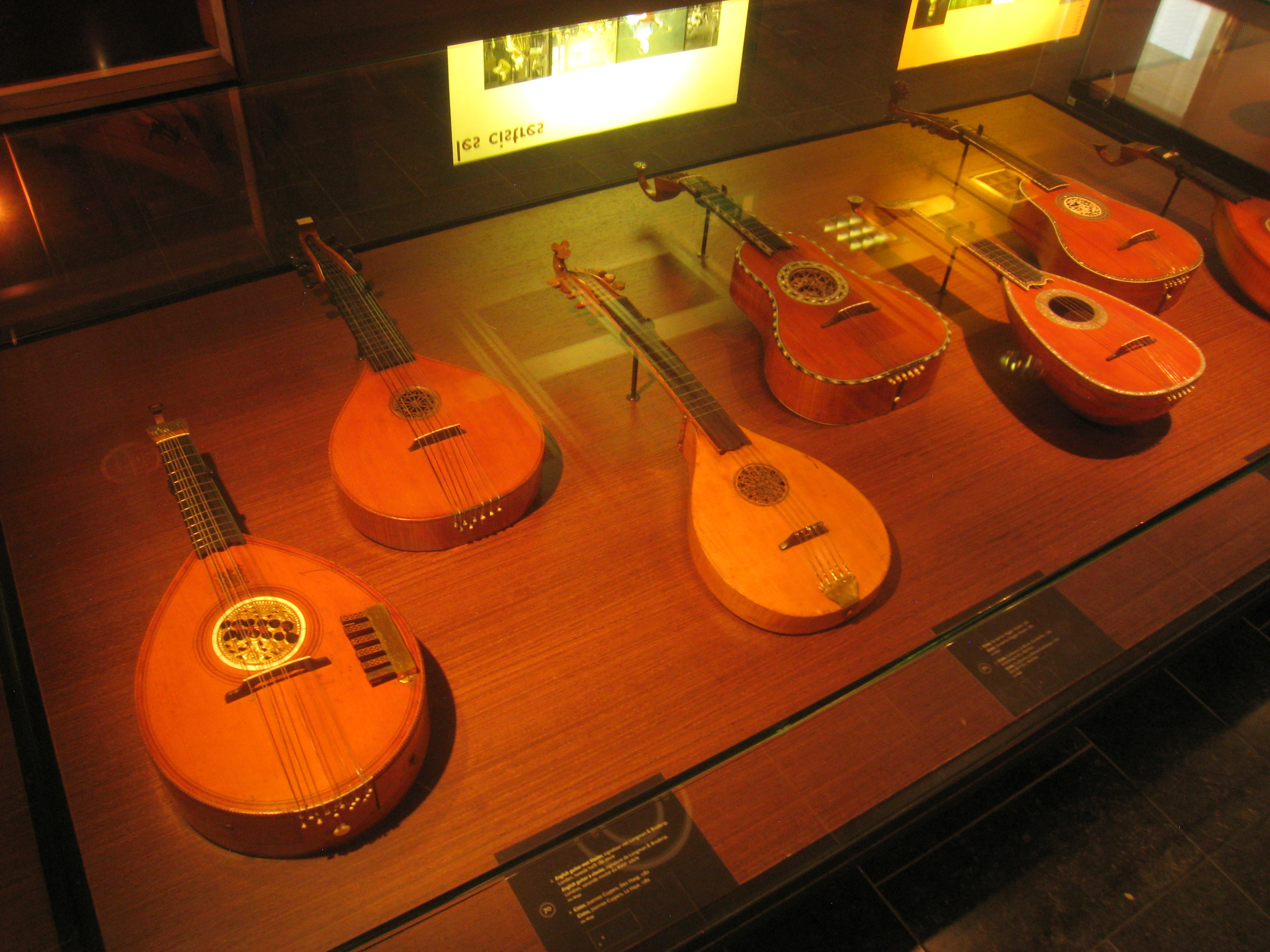
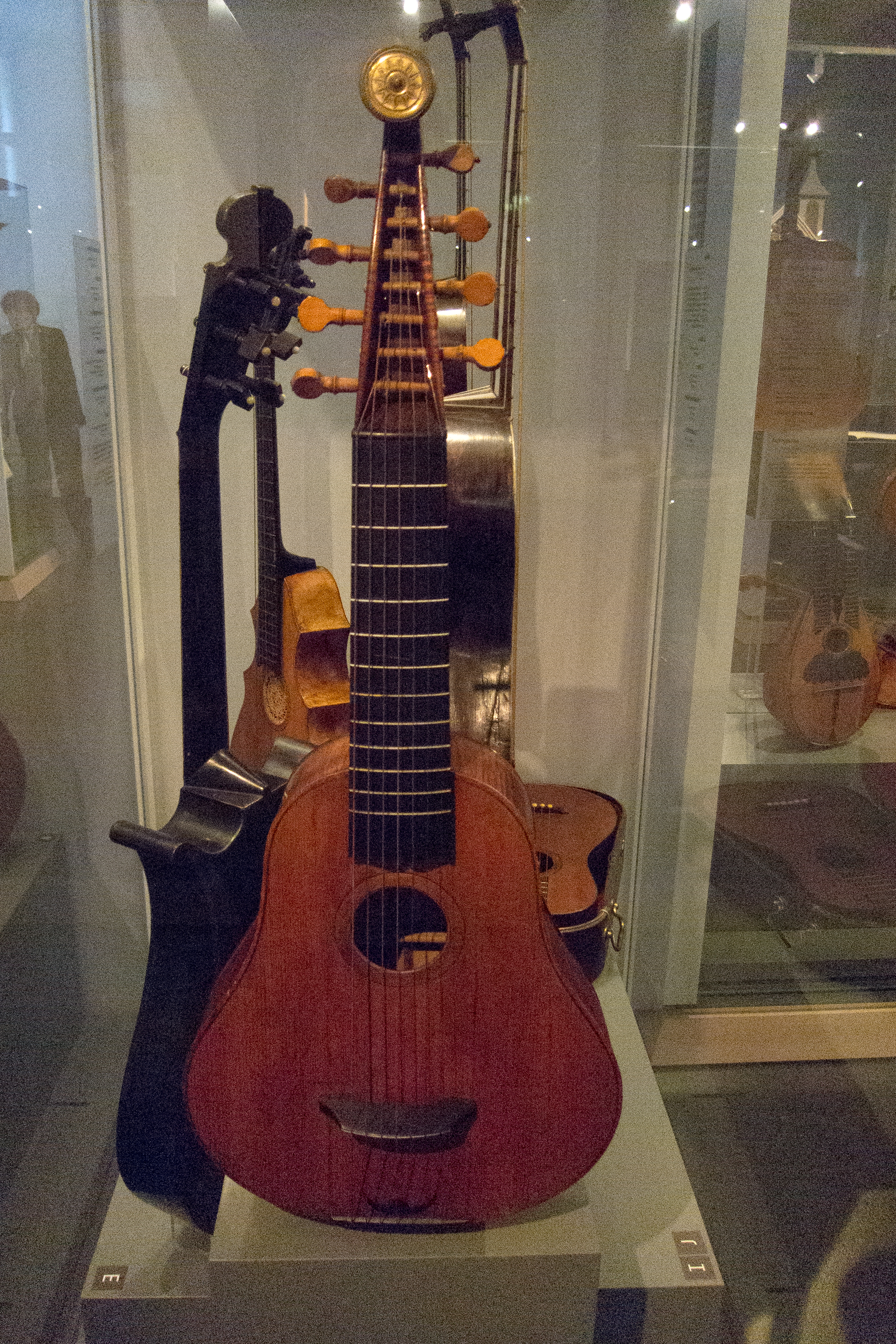
From left to right, 1: Stringed instruments in Musical Instrument Museum, Brussels, including two citterns by Gérard Joseph Deleplanque; 2: The Sister (Deutsche Guitarre) by Johann Wilhelm Bindernagel.

From the 16th until the 18th century the cittern was a common English barber shop instrument, kept in waiting areas for customers to entertain themselves and others with, and popular sheet music for the instrument was published to that end. The top of the pegbox was often decorated with a small carved head, perhaps not always of great artistic merit; in Shakespeare's Love's Labour's Lost, the term "cittern-head" is used as an insult:

HOLOFERNES: What is this?
BOYET: A cittern-head.
DUMAIN: The head of a bodkin.
BIRON: A Death's face in a ring.

Just as the lute was enlarged and bass-extended to become the theorbo and chitarrone for continuo work, so the cittern was developed into the ceterone, with its extended neck and unstopped bass strings, though this was a much less common instrument.

Gérard Joseph Deleplanque (1723-1784) was a luthier from Lille who made a wide variety of instruments, including citterns.

The instrument maker Johann Wilhelm Bindernagel (around 1770-1845), who worked in Gotha, made a mixed guitar-cittern under the name "Sister" or "German Guitar", which was equipped with seven gut strings.

The leading 18th-century Swedish songwriter Carl Michael Bellman played mostly on the cittern, and is shown with the instrument (now in the National Museum, Stockholm) in a 1779 portrait by Per Krafft the elder.

=== Modern citterns ===
Modern citterns
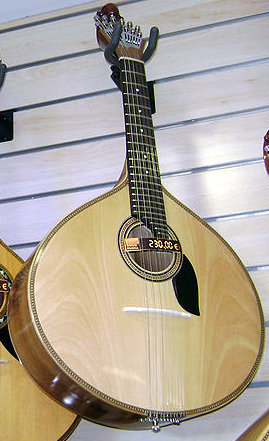
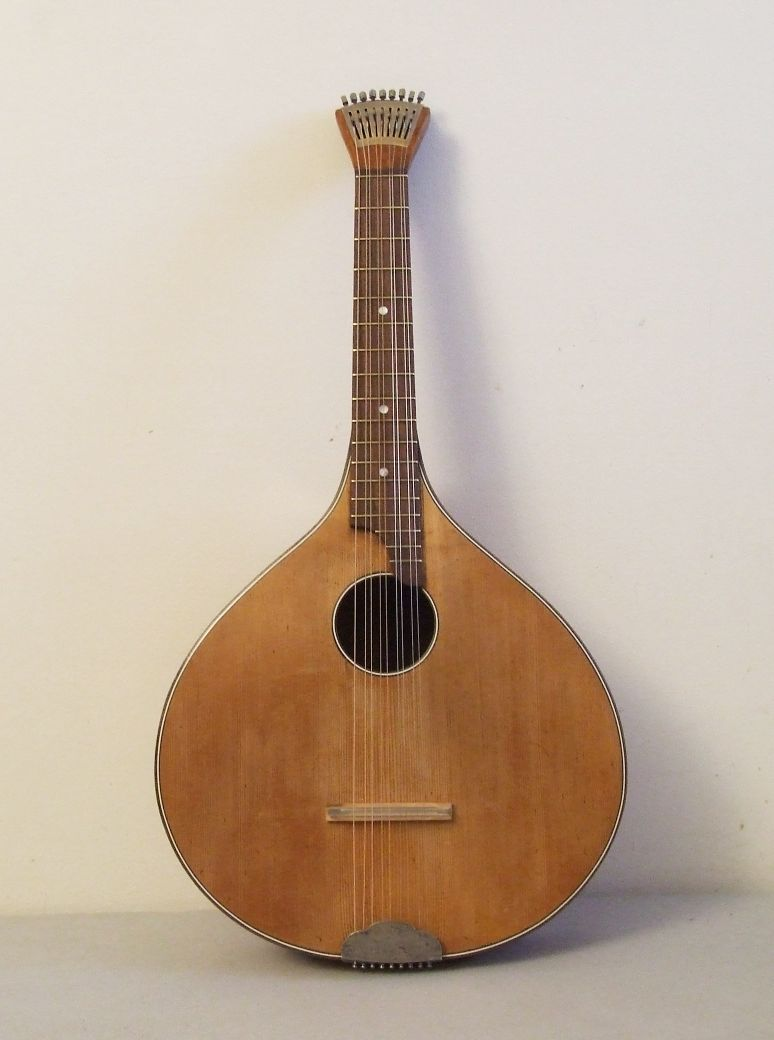
(Left): Portuguese guitar at a music shop, 2010; (right): Hamburger Waldzither

In Germany, the cittern survives under the names Waldzither and Lutherzither. The last name comes from the belief that Martin Luther played this instrument. Also, the names Thüringer Waldzither in Thüringer Wald, Harzzither in the Harz mountains, Halszither in German-speaking Switzerland are used. There is a tendency in modern German to interchange the words for cittern and zither. The term waldzither came into use around 1900, to distinguish citterns from zithers.

The cittern family survives as the Corsican cetara and the Portuguese guitar. The guitarra portuguesa is typically used to play the popular traditional music known as fado. In the early 1970s, using the guitarra and a 1930s archtop Martin guitar as models, English luthier Stefan Sobell created a "cittern", a hybrid instrument primarily used for playing folk music, which has proved to be popular with folk revival musicians.

== See also ==
- Chitarra Italiana
- English guitar
- Russian guitar
- Stringed instrument tunings
- Martina Rosenberger

== Bibliography ==
- Musick's Delight on the Cithren, John Playford (1666).
- Musick's Delight on the Modern Cittern, Robin Alexander Lucas, Vol.I. (2021) ISBN 9781838438500; Vol.II. (2022) ISBN 9781838438517; Vol.III. (2023) ISBN 9781838438524; Vol. IV. (2024) ISBN 9781838438531.
- Méthode pour Apprendre à Pincer du Cistre, ou Guitare Allemande, Charles Pollet (1786).
