= Cetara =

Corsican stringed musical instrument

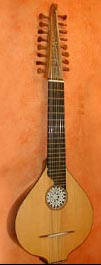
A Corsican cetara

The cetera or cetara is a plucked string instrument played in Corsica. It has sixteen, or sometimes eighteen, metal strings, running in paired courses, with a body similar to the mandolin, but larger, and is plucked with a plectrum made of horn or tortoiseshell.

The Italian term also occurs in historical sources and usually interpreted to indicate a musical instrument of the cittern family.

== See also ==
- Cetra
- Cittern
- Roland Ferrandi
