= List of musical instruments by Hornbostel–Sachs number: 321.322 =

This is a list of instruments by Hornbostel-Sachs number, covering those instruments that are classified under 321.322 under that system. These instruments may be known as necked box lutes or necked guitars.

3: Instruments in which sound is produced by one or more vibrating strings (chordophones, string instruments).

32: Instruments in which the resonator and string bearer are physically united and can not be separated without destroying the instrument

321: Instruments in which the strings run in a plane parallel to the sound table (lutes)

321.3: Instruments in which the string bearer is a plain handle (handle lutes)

321.32: Instrument in which the handle is attached to, or carved from, the resonator, like a neck (necked lutes)

321.322 : Instrument whose body is shaped like a box (necked box lutes)

These instruments may be classified with a suffix, based on the method used to cause the strings to vibrate.

- 4: Hammers or beaters
- 5: Bare hands and fingers
- 6: Plectrum
- 7: Bowing
  - 71: Using a bow
  - 72: Using a wheel
  - 73: Using a ribbon
- 8: Keyboard
- 9: Using a mechanical drive

== List ==
| Instrument | Tradition | Hornbostel–Sachs classification | Description |
|---|---|---|---|
| bandurria | Spain | 321.322 | Flatback bandurria is box lute. Roundback bandurria is bowl lute. |
| bouzouki, Irish | Ireland | 321.322 | An Irish variant of the Greek bouzouki, with a flat rather than bowl-shaped back |
| cuatro | Colombia and Venezuela | 321.322 | Fretted stringed instrument with a hollow body and with four strings |
| cuatro | Puerto Rico | 321.322 | Fretted stringed instrument with a hollow body, derived from the Spanish tiple and other stringed instruments, made from carved wood with strings (ten, in five courses of two) |
| dotara | Bangladesh | 321.322 | Small stringed instrument, with plucked metal strings, elongated belly as soundboard and narrow neck ending in a pegbox, decorated with carvings of animals and covered with skin |
| drejelire | Sweden | 321.322-72 | Hurdy-gurdy that uses a rosined wheel to create sound |
| dutar | Turkmenistan | 321.322 | Plucked string instrument with two strings and a long neck, strummed or plucked |
| fiddle violin | | 321.322-71 | |
| guitar | | 321.322 | Fretted stringed instrument, long-necked with a flat soundboard and back, and incurved sides |
| guitar, Portuguese | Portugal | 321.322 | Fretted 12-stringed (in 6 courses) instrument with a hollow body |
| Hardingfele; Hardanger fiddle | Norway | 321.322-71 | Ornately decorated fiddle with four main strings and four resonating strings beneath them, which are not touched by the bow |
| mandola | European | 321.322 | Originally a bowlback, but modern flatbacks exist too |
| mandole mandole, mondol | Music of Algeria, Music of Morocco, Chaabi music, Music of Kabyle people, Andalusian classical music, Andalusi nubah, Nuubaat | 321.322 | Fretted stringed instrument, short-necked, 4 courses/8 strings or 5 courses/10 strings or 6 courses/12 strings. Flat soundboard and flatback. |
| mandolin bandolim | Europe, has spread worldwide | 321.322 | Fretted stringed instrument, short-necked, the types belonging to this category have a flat, carved, or canted soundboard and flat or carved back |
| merlin M4 | Canada | 321.322 | Fretted guitar-shaped musical instrument with four strings, tuned diatonically |
| nyckelharpa | Sweden | 321.322-71 | Bowed keyed fiddle |
| suroz | Balochs | 321.322 | Bowed string instrument with a long neck, similar to a fiddle or sarangi and played vertically |
| tiple Tiple Colombiano | Colombia | 321.322 | Guitar-like instrument with a neck and four courses of three strings each |
| tres | Cuba | 321.322 | Guitar-like instrument with a neck and three courses of two strings each |
| ukulele uke | Hawaii | 321.322 | String instrument derived from the Portuguese braguinha, from the Hawaiian uku lele, jumping flea, referring to the swift fingerwork the instrument requires chords on a ukulele |
| vihuela viola da mano (Italian/Portuguese) | Spain, Portugal, Italy | 321.322 | Most commonly twelve-stringed, arranged in six courses |
| viol | | 321.322-71 | |
| violin | | 321.322-71 | |
| waldzither | Germany | 321.322 | mandola-like lute with nine steel strings |
| yueqin moon guitar, moon lute, gekkin, laqin | China | 321.322 | Two varieties: a round moon-shaped lute with four strings and a short neck, played with a plectrum, common in Northern China, and a variety with a longer neck found in Taiwan |
