= Korpiklaani discography =

This is the discography for Finnish folk metal band Korpiklaani.

== Studio albums ==
Title	Album details	Peak chart positions					
Title	Album details	FIN	SWI	AUT	GER	BEL (WA)	JPN
Spirit of the Forest	Released: November 10, 2003; Label: Napalm Records; Formats: CD, digital download	—	—	—	—	—	—
Voice of Wilderness	Released: February 1, 2005; Label: Napalm Records; Formats: CD, digital download	—	—	—	—	—	195
Tales Along This Road	Released: April 21, 2006; Label: Napalm Records; Formats: CD, digital download	—	—	—	—	—	157
Tervaskanto	Released: June 26, 2007; Label: Napalm Records; Formats: CD, CD+DVD, digital download	36	—	—	85	—	83
Korven kuningas	Released: March 21, 2008; Label: Nuclear Blast; Formats: CD, LP, digital download	16	—	—	72	—	175
Karkelo	Released: August 25, 2009; Label: Nuclear Blast; Formats: CD, LP, digital download	26	94	—	81	—	228
Ukon Wacka	Released: February 15, 2011; Label: Nuclear Blast; Formats: CD, LP, digital download	9	57	75	72	—	254
Manala	Released: August 14, 2012; Label: Nuclear Blast; Formats: CD, LP, digital download	19	70	60	47	180	243
Noita	Released: May 5, 2015; Label: Nuclear Blast; Formats: CD, LP, digital download	16	61	70	46	186	195
Kulkija	Released: September 7, 2018; Label: Nuclear Blast; Formats: CD, LP, digital download	24	29	72	45	—	265
Jylhä	Released: February 5, 2021; Label: Nuclear Blast; Formats: CD, LP, digital download	6	29	—	61	—	261
Rankarumpu	Released: April 5, 2024; Label: Nuclear Blast; Formats: CD, LP, digital download	17	—	—	—	—	—
"—" denotes a recording that did not chart or was not released in that territory.

== Singles ==
Title	Year	Peak chart positions	Album
Title	Year	HUN	Album
"Nisson Čahppes Biktasiinnes (Lady In Black)"	1995	—	Hunka Lunka
"Ođđa máilbmi"	1999	—	Idja
"Keep on Galloping"	2008	7	Korven Kuningas
"Vodka"	2009	—	Karkelo
"Ukon Wacka"	2010	—	Ukon Wacka
"Tequila"	2011	—	Ukon Wacka
"Metsälle"	2011	—	Manala
"Kunnia"	2012	—	Manala
"Rauta"	2012	—	Manala
"—" denotes a recording that did not chart or was not released in that territory.

== Music videos ==
Year	Title	Directed	Album
1999	"Ođđa Máilbmi"	—	Idja
2002	"Kanöhta Lávlla"	—	Shamániac
2003	"Wooden Pints"	—	Spirit Of The Forest
2004	"Hunting Song"	Kristian Karvonen	Voice Of Wilderness
2005	"Kädet Siipinä"	Kristian Karvonen	Voice Of Wilderness
2005	"Beer Beer"	—	Voice Of Wilderness
2006	"Happy Little Boozer"	—	Tales Along This Road
2007	"Tervaskanto"	—	Tervaskanto
2008	"Keep On Galloping"	—	Korven Kuningas
2008	"Metsämies"	—	Korven Kuningas
2009	"Vodka"	Markku Kirves	Karkelo
2011	"Tequila"	Markku Kirves	Ukon Wacka
2012	"Honor" (Lyric Video)	—	Manala
2012	"Rauta"	Markku Kirves	Manala
2015	"Pilli On Pajusta Tehty"	—	Noita
2015	"Ämmänhauta"	Joona Sarisalmi & Tapani Hiedanniemi	Noita
2016	"A Man With A Plan"	RMIT University	Noita
2018	"Kotikonnut" (Lyric Video)	—	Kulkija
2018	"Harmaja"	Ville Lipiäinen	Kulkija
2018	"Henkselipoika"	Markku Kirves	Kulkija
2018	"Aallon alla" (Lyric Video)	—	Kulkija
2018	"Kuin korpi nukkuva" (Lyric Video)	—	Kulkija
2019	Beer Beer (Featuring Christopher Bowes, from Scotland) (Lyric Video)	—	Kulkija (Tour Edition)
2019	Kaljaa (Featuring Vesku Joskinen, from Finland) (Lyric Video)	—	Kulkija (Tour Edition)
2019	Øl Øl (Featuring Trollfest, from Norway) (Lyric Video)	—	Kulkija (Tour Edition)
2019	Bier Bier (Featuring Gerre, from Germany) (Lyric Video)	—	Kulkija (Tour Edition)
2019	Bír Bír (Featuring Fleret, from Czechia) (Lyric Video)	—	Kulkija (Tour Edition)
2019	Pivo Pivo (Featuring Meri Tadić or IRIJ, in Croatian) (Lyric Video)	—	Kulkija (Tour Edition)
2019	Land Of A Thousand Drinks (Lyric Video)	—	Kulkija (Tour Edition)
2019	Jägermeister	—	Kulkija (Tour Edition)
2020	Beer Kill Kill (Featuring Steve "Zetro" Souza, from USA) (Lyric Video)	—	Kulkija (Tour Edition)
2020	Birra Birra (Featuring Emilio or SKILTRON, from Argentina) (Lyric Video)	—	Kulkija (Tour Edition)
2020	Pivo Pivo (Featuring Milan or ACHSAR, from Slovakia) (Lyric Video)	—	Kulkija (Tour Edition)
2020	Bier Bier (Featuring Heidevolk, from the Netherlands) (Lyric Video)	—	Kulkija (Tour Edition)
2020	Bira Bira (Featuring Jesper Anastasiadis or Turisas, from Finland) (Lyric Video)	—	Kulkija (Tour Edition)
2020	Mellanöl (Featuring Viking Danielson or SVARTA LJUSET from Sweden) (Lyric Video)	—	Kulkija (Tour Edition)
2020	"Sudenmorsian" (Lyric Video)	—	Sudenmorsian (Single)
2020	"Leväluhta"	Markku Kirves	Jylhä
2020	"Mylly"	Markku Kirves	Jylhä
2020	"Sanaton maa"	Markku Kirves	Jylhä
2021	"Niemi"	Markku Kirves	Jylhä
2021	"Tuuleton"	Markku Kirves	Jylhä
2021	"Ennen	Markku Kirves	Ennen (Single)
2022	"Krystallomantia" (Lyric Video)	—	Krystallomantia (Single)
2023	"Gotta Go Home"	Miika Hakala	Gotta Go Home (Single)
2024	"Saunaan"	Tuukka Temonen and Aki Huttunen	Rankarumpu
2024	"Aita"	Tuukka Temonen	Rankarumpu
2024	"Oraakkelit"	Vesa Ranta/Kaira Films	Rankarumpu
2024	"Rankarumpu"	Vesa Ranta/Kaira Films and Petri Marttinen	Rankarumpu
2024	"Harhainen Höyhen"	Miika Hakala	Rankarumpu
2025	"Kalmisto"	Teppo Ristola Photography	Rankarumpu
2025	"Tapa sen kun kerkeet"	Thom'Art Studios by Thomas Dolvelde	Rankarumpu
Note: the listed music videos, if an English version was created as well, only include the original Finnish-language versions of the videos.
