= Rauno =

- Gender: Male

Origin
- Region of origin: Estonia, Finland

Rauno is an Estonian and Finnish masculine given name, and may refer to:

- Rauno Aaltonen (born 1938), Finnish former professional rally driver
- Rauno Alliku (born 1990), Estonian professional footballer
- Rauno Bies (born 1961), Finnish former sport shooter and Olympic medalist
- Rauno Heinla (born 1982), Estonian strongman competitor
- Rauno Korpi (born 1951), Finnish ice hockey coach
- Rauno Lehtinen (1932–2006), Finnish conductor and composer
- Rauno Lehtiö (1942–2026), Finnish ice hockey player
- Rauno Mäkinen (1931–2010), Finnish wrestler and Olympic medalist
- Rauno Miettinen (born 1949), Finnish former Nordic combined skier
- Rauno Esa Nieminen (born 1955), Finnish musician, writer, artist, and researcher
- Rauno Nurger (born 1993), Estonian basketball player
- Rauno Pehka (born 1969), Estonian former professional basketball player
- Rauno Ronkainen (born 1964), Finnish TV and film cinematographer and cameraman
- Rauno Ruotsalainen (born 1938), Finnish footballer
- Rauno Sappinen (born 1996), Estonian professional footballer
- Rauno Saunavaara (born ????), Finnish paralympic track and field athlete
- Rauno Sirk (born 1975), Estonian military commander
- Rauno Suominen (1939–2018), Finnish tennis player and coach
- Rauno Tamme (born 1992), Estonian volleyball player
