= Vodka (disambiguation) =

Vodka is a distilled alcoholic beverage.

Vodka may also refer to:

- VoDKa, a cyber alias of Columbine school shooter Dylan Klebold
- Vodka (horse), a Japanese racehorse
- Vodka (Case Closed), a character in Case Closed
- "Vodka", a song by Mike & Rich from Expert Knob Twiddlers
- "Vodka" (song), a 2008 song by Morena
- "Vodka", a song by Korpiklaani from their 2009 album Karkelo
- Vodkaa, komisario Palmu, a 1969 film by Matti Kassila
