= Gue =

Extinct type of bowed string instruments

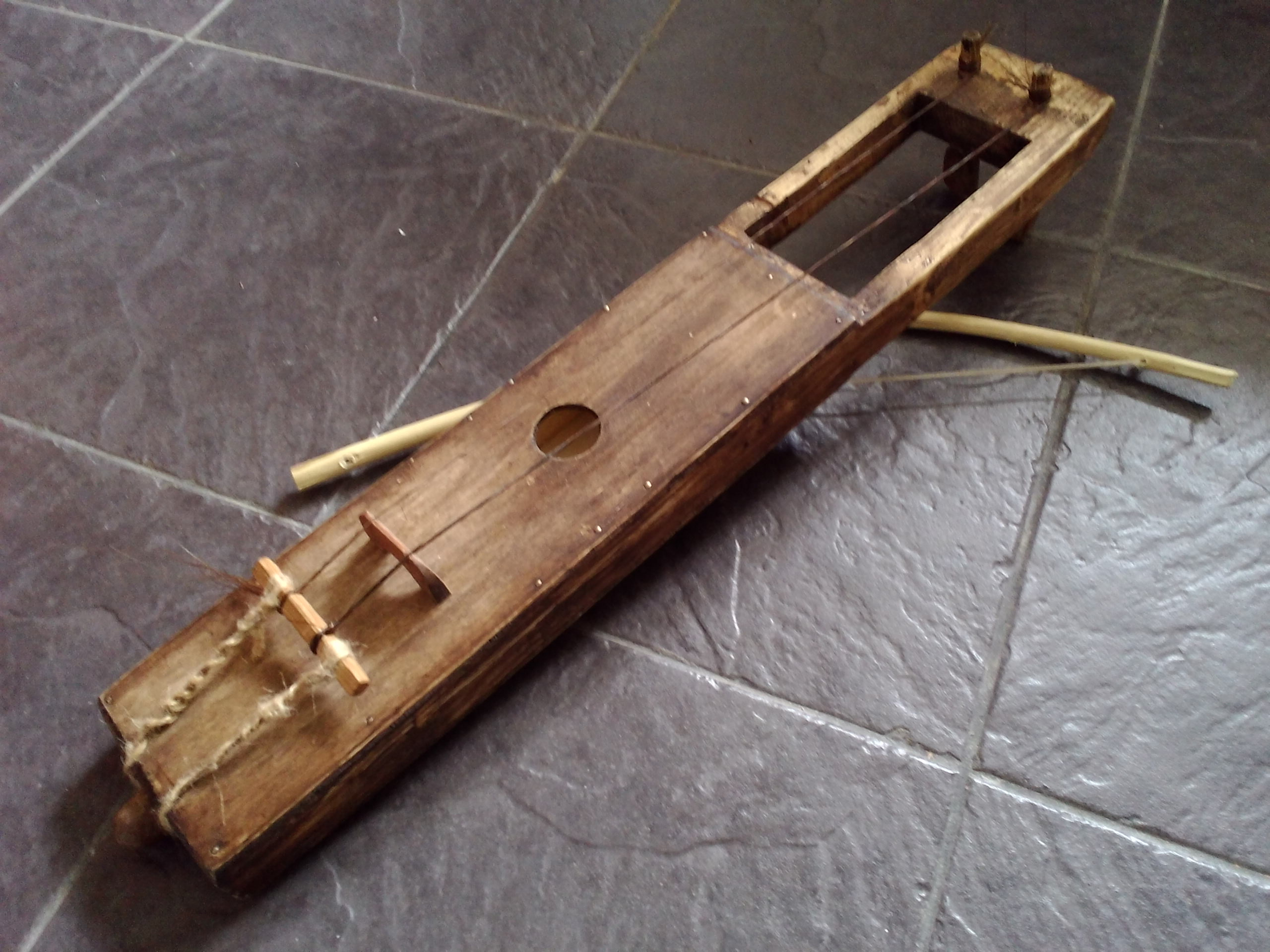
Charlie Bynum's rendition of the Shetland Gue, donated to the Shetland Museum and Archives. 2014

The gue was a type of two-stringed bowed lyre or zither from the Shetland Isles. The instrument was described in 1809 by Arthur Edmondston in View of the Ancient and Present State of the Zetland Islands:

"Before violins were introduced, the musicians performed on an instrument called a gue, which appears to have had some similarity to the violin, but had only two strings of horse hair, and was played upon in the same manner as a violoncello."

The exact details of the gue are unclear, but it possibly resembled extinct bowed lyres such as the Norwegian giga, or the extant Swedish and Estonian talharpa or Finnish jouhikko. However, other ethnomusicologists believe the gue more resembled the Icelandic fiðla, a two-stringed bowed zither. Peter Cooke notes the prevalence of the tautirut bowed zither among the Inuit peoples in areas of Canada influenced by Orkney and Shetland sailors, as possible evidence that the Inuit bowed zither is based on a Shetland model.

The first person to recreate the Shetland gue for modern musicians was instrument maker and musician Corwen Broch of Ancient Music, who began making them in 2007. What he freely admits is a tentative reconstruction made initially for the purposes of experimental music archaeology was based largely on Scandinavian bowed lyre design and the surviving written descriptions as discussed in the works of Otto Andersson. In 2009, Corwen was commissioned to make a reconstruction for the Shetland Museum. In 2012, luthier Michael J. King asked to use Corwen's design in a CD-rom of instrument plans. So far all subsequent interpretations of the instrument by other makers draw heavily on Corwen Broch's initial design.

== See also ==
- Jouhikko
- Talharpa
- Fiðla
- Tautirut
