= Talharpa =

Stringed instrument of northern Europe

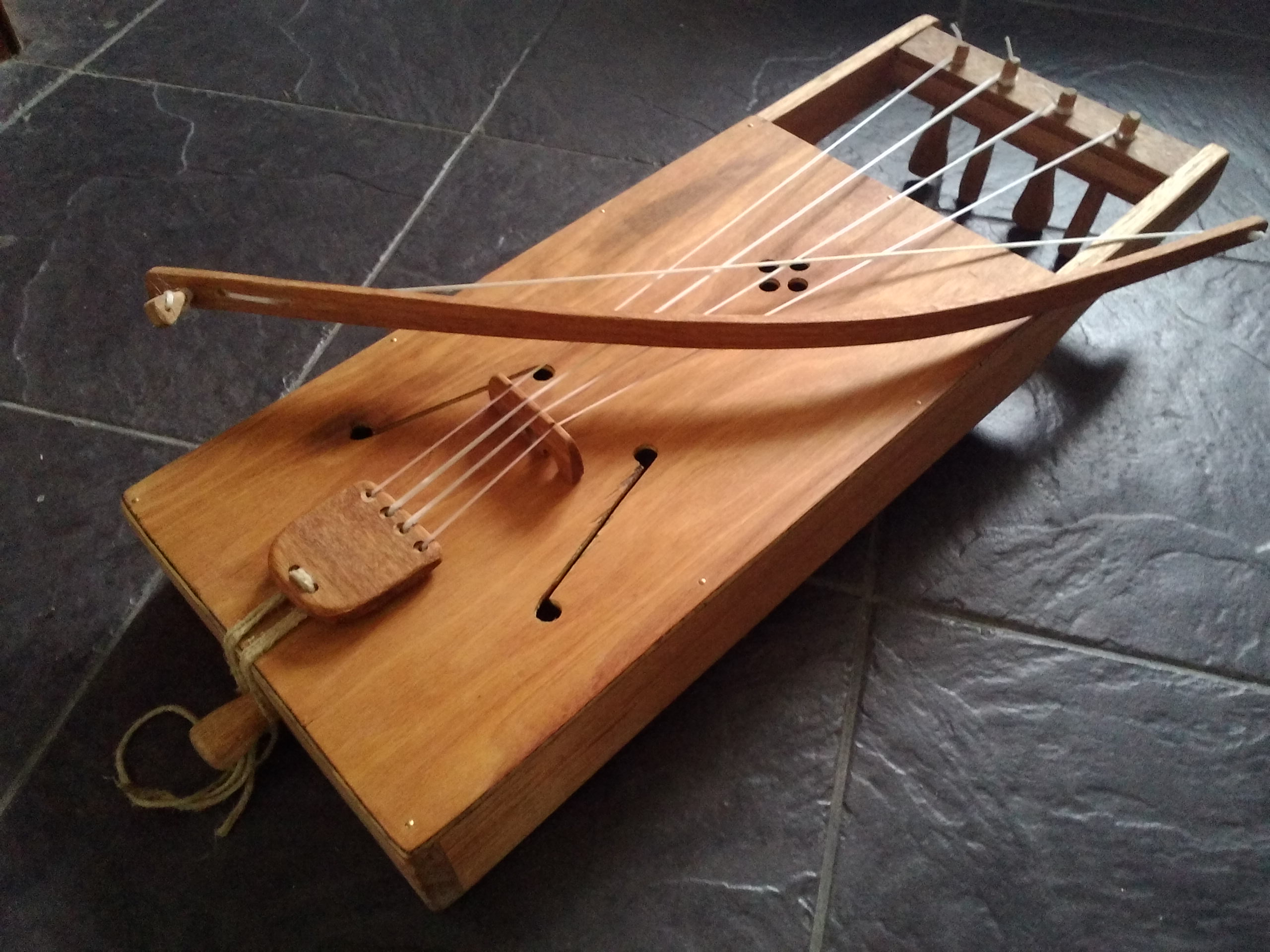
Talharpa, by Charlie Bynum, Silver Spoon Music, Alkmaar NL, 2014

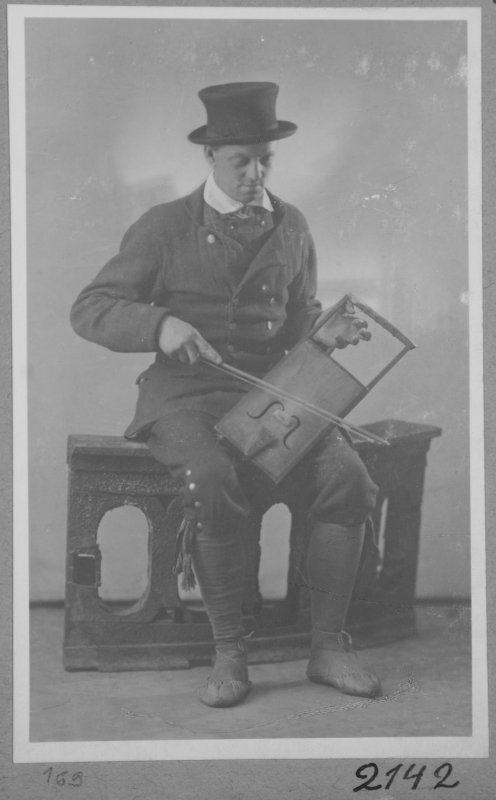
An Estonian man playing the hiiu kannel (or, talharpa), ca. 1920.

Talharpa, tagelharpa ("tail-hair harp"), or stråkharpa ("bowed harp") in Swedish, and hiiu kannel or hiiurootsi kannel in Estonian, is a two- to four-stringed bowed lyre from northern Europe. It is questionable whether it was formerly common and widespread in Scandinavia. Historically, it has been played in the Estonian-Swedish areas and in Western Estonia, particularly among Estonian Swedes who came to Estonia around the 10th century from the Swedish part of Finland; they likely brought the instrument with them (later Swedish settlers in Estonia did not know nor use the talharpa). It is similar to the Finnish jouhikko and the Welsh crwth. Jouhikko, a close relative of talharpa, is still known in Finland.

== Etymology ==
The prefix in talharpa is an abbreviated and dialectical form of the word tagel ("horsehair") from which the strings were made (compare cognate "tail"). Historical spellings includes Old Swedish taghl (which should make /taɣl/) and tavel/tauel (compare Old Danish: tauel, taul), with /aue/ → /au/ becoming a dialectal diphthong which then gets treated as /aa/ in other dialects (dialect X: /taul/ → dialect Y: /taal/).

The Estonian name hiiu kannel, originally hiiurootsi kannel (lit. 'Hiiu-Swedish kannel'), refers to the halfway point to Hiiumaa, the island Vormsi, which historically was inhabited by Estonian Swedish people. A kannel is otherwise a type of Estonian plucked instrument.

== Background ==
The earliest known Norse literary mentions of a harp or lyre date to the Eddic poem Völuspá, though not as a bowed instrument. There have been attempts to interpret as talharpa the iconography, that show Gunnar charming the snakes in the snake pit with a harpa-like instrument (also don't include a bow and instrument is in a very different shape) and a stone carving at the Trondheim Cathedral of Norway, that shows a musician playing a bowed hurdy gurdy- or nyckelharpa-like instrument, dating to around the 14th century. In Nordic countries, the bowed lyre (as opposed to the plucked harp) has continued in Finland, where it is called jouhikko or a jouhikantele and Estonia where it is called hiiu kannel.

== Construction techniques ==
Talharpas were traditionally built by hollowing out a single block of wood and gluing a soundboard on top, as can be seen from many instruments stored in the museums in Estonia and Finland. In modern times, many talharpa makers continue to build their musical instruments from solid wood, such as Rait Pihlap, Mihkel Soon or Rauno Nieminen. Others began to make tagelharpas following the classical school of lutherie, with each part assembled and characterized by reinforcements, bands, counter-bands, figured bottoms and blocks (such as Raivo Sildoja).

== Modern use ==
The talharpa is sometimes used in modern folk music, most notably by the Estonian nu-folk duo Puuluup who use talharpas and modern live looping. Other notable musicians and bands, that use a bowed-lyre family instruments: Sofia Joons, Strand...Rand, Pekko Käppi, Styrbjörn Bergelt, Krista Sildoja, Metsatöll, Wardruna, Per Runberg, Janne Mängli, A Tergo Lupi.

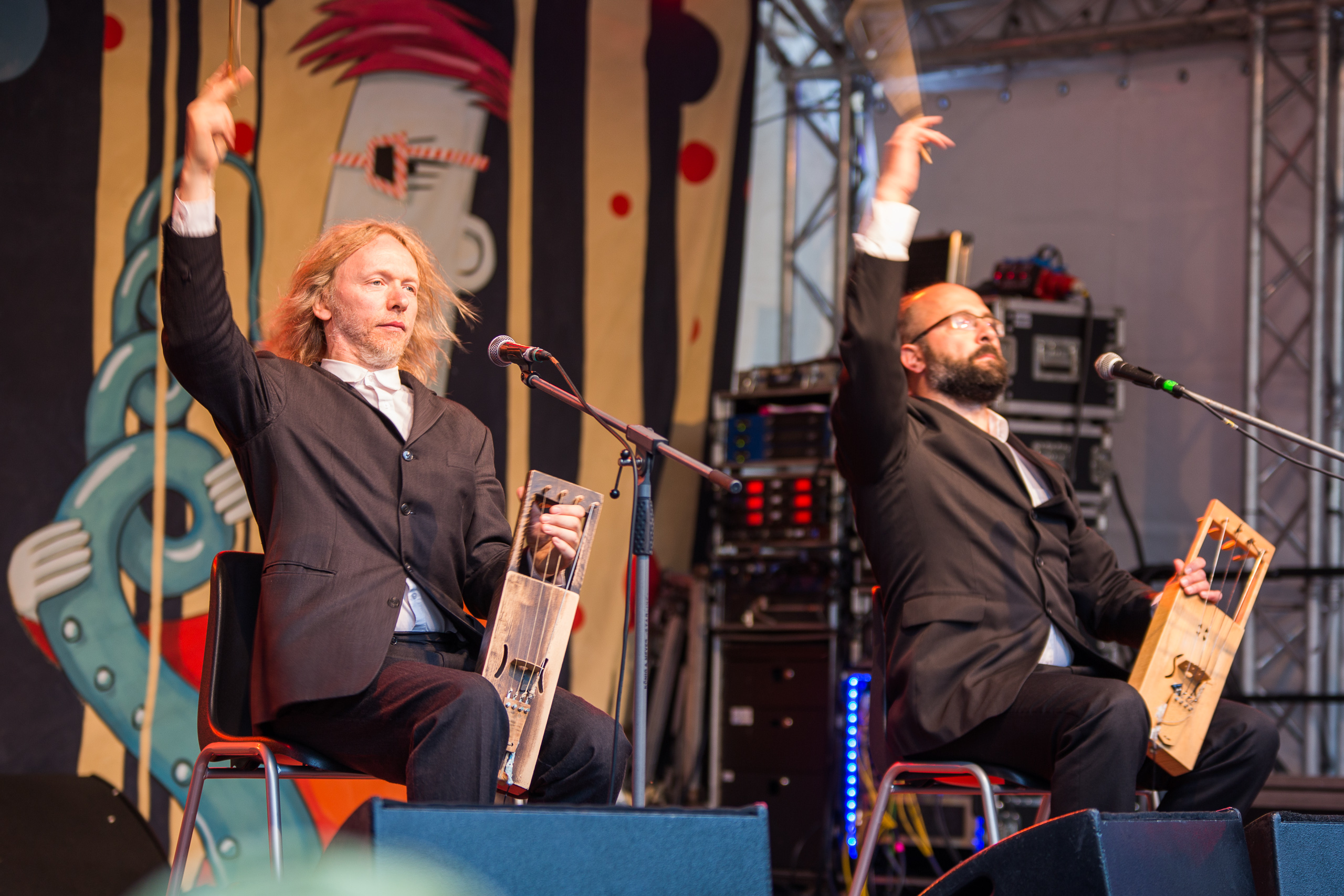
Puuluup on stage

== See also ==
- Crwth
- Jouhikko
- Gue
- Byzantine lyra (bowed lyre)
- Hiiu kannel (in Estonian)
- Bowed string instrument
