= Tervaskanto =

Studio album by Korpiklaani
- Released: 26 June 2007
- Recorded: 2006 at the Fantom Studios
- Genre: Folk metal
- Length: 42:31
- Languages: English, Finnish
- Label: Napalm
- Producers: Samu Oittinen, Jonne Järvelä

Korpiklaani chronology
Tales Along This Road (2006)	Tervaskanto (2007)	Korven Kuningas (2008)

Professional ratings
Review scores
Source	Rating
AllMusic	4/5 stars
Terrorizer Magazine	7/10 stars

Tervaskanto ("Resinous Stump") is the fourth studio album by Finnish folk metal band Korpiklaani. It was released on 26 June 2007 through Napalm Records.

== Track listing ==
No.	Title	Length
1.	"Let's Drink"	2:43
2.	"Tervaskanto" ("Resinous Stump")	3:54
3.	"Viima" ("Icy Wind")	3:33
4.	"Veriset äpärät" ("Bloody Bastards Children")	4:27
5.	"Running with the Wolves"	3:53
6.	"Liekkiön isku" ("The Revenge of Liekkiö")	2:56
7.	"Palovana" ("Inner Fire")	5:04
8.	"Karhunkaatolaulu" ("Bear Hunt Song")	2:52
9.	"Misty Fields"	3:25
10.	"Vesilahden veräjillä" ("At the Gates of Vesilahti")	6:58
11.	"Nordic Feast"	2:46
Total length:		42:31

== Personnel ==
- Jonne Järvelä - vocals, guitars, mandolin
- Cane - guitars, backing vocals
- Jarkko Aaltonen - bass
- Matti Johansson - drums, backing vocals
- Juho Kauppinen - accordion, guitars, backing vocals
- Hittavainen - violin, jouhikko, tin whistle, recorder, torupill

=== Guest musicians ===
- Nakki - additional vocals
- Pete Ilvespakka - additional vocals
- Yudai Fujita - additional vocals
- Samuel Dan - additional vocals
- Paukku - additional vocals

=== Production ===
- Harri Hinkka - photography
- Jan "Örkki" Yrlund - artwork, photography
- Mika Jussila - mastering
- Jonne Järvelä - producer
- Samu Oittinen - producer, engineering, mixing
