= Voice of Wilderness =

Studio album by Korpiklaani
- Released: 1 February 2005
- Genre: Folk metal
- Length: 41:00
- Languages: English, Finnish
- Label: Napalm
- Producer: Samu Oittinen

Korpiklaani chronology
Spirit of the Forest (2003)	Voice of Wilderness (2005)	Tales Along This Road (2006)

Voice of Wilderness is the second studio album by Finnish folk metal band Korpiklaani. It was released on 1 February 2005 through Napalm Records.

In 2019, fourteen alternative versions of the song "Beer Beer" were released as bonus tracks on the Tour Edition of the album Kulkija.

== Track listing ==
All songs written by Jonne Järvelä.

No.	Title	Length
1.	"Cottages & Saunas"	3:16
2.	"Journey Man"	2:33
3.	"Fields in Flames"	3:52
4.	"Pine Woods"	4:26
5.	"Spirit of the Forest"	4:27
6.	"Native Land"	4:32
7.	"Hunting Song"	3:02
8.	"Ryyppäjäiset" (Booze-up)	3:00
9.	"Beer Beer"	3:00
10.	"Old Tale"	5:40
11.	"Kädet siipinä" ("Hands as Their Wings")	3:12
Total length:		41:02

== Personnel ==
=== Members ===
- Jonne Järvelä - vocals, joik, guitars
- Matti Johansson - drums, backing vocals
- Ali Määttä - percussion
- Cane - guitars, backing vocals
- Honka - guitars
- Arto Tissari - bass, backing shouts
- Hittavainen - fiddle, bagpipes, mouth harp, jouhikko, torupill

=== Guest musicians ===
- Mäkkärä - backing shouts
- Frank - backing shouts
- Virva Holtiton - kantele
- Katja Juhola - accordion

=== Production ===
- Sini-Suvi Helenius - photography
- Pekka Keskinen - cover art, photography
- Boris Stefanov - photography
- Monica Nordling - photography
- Samu Oittinen - recording, mixing, mastering, producer
- Jonne Järvelä - photography
