= Spirit of the Forest =

Studio album by Korpiklaani
- Released: 10 November 2003
- Genre: Folk metal
- Length: 48:07
- Languages: English, Finnish
- Label: Napalm
- Producer: Jay Bjugg

Korpiklaani chronology
Shamániac (2002)	Spirit of the Forest (2003)	Voice of Wilderness (2005)

Spirit of the Forest is the debut studio album by Finnish folk metal band Korpiklaani. It was released in 2003 through Napalm Records.

Exclaim! remarked about the album, "Despite the odd iffy moment Spirit of the Forest is fun and ballsy, if not really all that metal." Norway's Scream Magazine gave a strong grade, 5 out of 6.

== Track listing ==
All songs written by Jonne Järvelä, except where noted.

No.	Title	Length
1.	"Wooden Pints"	3:42
2.	"Before the Morning Sun"	4:24
3.	"God of Wind"	3:14
4.	"With Trees"	8:06
5.	"Pellonpekko" (Lemmetty)	3:35
6.	"You Looked into My Eyes"	2:14
7.	"Hullunhumppa"	1:29
8.	"Man Can Go Even Through the Grey Stone"	2:22
9.	"Pixies Dance"	2:19
10.	"Juokse sinä humma" ("Keep On Running, My Horse", traditional)	1:11
11.	"Crows Bring the Spring"	5:25
12.	"Hengettömiltä hengiltä" ("From the Spirits of the Dead")	0:34
13.	"Shaman Drum" (lyrics by Järvelä, music by Järvelä/Lemmetty)	4:57
14.	"Mother Earth"	4:35
Total length:		48:07

== Personnel ==
=== Members ===
- Jonne Järvelä - vocals, guitars, shaman drum
- Ali - percussion
- Hittavainen - violin, jouhikko, flute
- Honka - guitars
- Arto - bass

=== Guest musicians ===
- Tarnanen - accordion
- Jay Bjugg - guitars
- Samu "Dominator" Ruotsalainen - drums

=== Production ===
- Jameye - engineering
- Ozzie Rissanen - engineering
- Tarnanen - mixing, engineering
- Mika Jussila - mastering
- Jay Bjugg - producer, engineering, mixing
- Pekka Keskinen - cover art, booklet design
