= Kulkija =

Studio album by Korpiklaani
- Released: 7 September 2018
- Recorded: Sound Supreme Studio at Hämeenlinna, Finland
- Genre: Folk metal
- Length: 71:20
- Language: Finnish
- Label: Nuclear Blast
- Producer: Janne Saksa

Korpiklaani chronology
Noita (2015)	Kulkija (2018)	Jylhä (2021)

Professional ratings
Review scores
Source	Rating
Blabbermouth.net	8.5/10
Metal Hammer Germany	4/7
Metal Hammer UK	3/5 stars
Rock Hard	7.5/10

Kulkija ("The Wanderer") is the tenth studio album by Finnish folk metal band Korpiklaani. Released on 7 September 2018, it features themes like travelling, nostalgia and homesickness. It is the band's longest studio album at 71 minutes and 20 seconds, thus beating 2008's Korven Kuningas by almost a minute. The album reached the top 30 chart positions in Finland and Switzerland.

In 2019, the album was released in a special Tour Edition that features a bonus disc called Beer Beer, which is composed by various artists invited by the band to perform their song of the same name in different languages and versions.

== Reception ==
Kulkija received positive reviews from critics, with praise going to the band for having updated its sound, flirting with genres like doom metal and acoustic while maintaining its classic essence with elements like drinking songs, although some felt the album was not as strong as their previous release, Noita.

== Track listing ==
Kulkija track listing
No.	Title	Length
1.	"Neito" (The Maiden)	3:52
2.	"Korpikuusen kyynel" (Moonshine)	4:07
3.	"Aallon alla" (Under the Wave)	4:05
4.	"Harmaja" (The Grey)	5:08
5.	"Kotikonnut" (Homestead)	4:23
6.	"Korppikalliota" (The Raven's Rock)	5:38
7.	"Kallon malja" (Chalice of the Skull)	9:46
8.	"Sillanrakentaja" (Bridge Builder)	6:44
9.	"Henkselipoika" (A Boy in Suspenders)	3:56
10.	"Pellervoinen"	3:19
11.	"Riemu" (Joy)	5:15
12.	"Kuin korpi nukkuva" (Like a Sleeping Forest)	3:56
13.	"Juomamaa" (Drinker's Land)	3:49
14.	"Tuttu on tie" (The Road is Familiar)	7:22
Total length:		71:20

Beer Beer (Tour Edition bonus disc)
No.	Title	Length
1.	"Kaljaa" (featuring Vesku Jokinen from Klamydia)	2:36
2.	"Bier Bier" (featuring Andreas "Gerre" Geremia from Tankard)	2:36
3.	"Bíra Bíra" (featuring Fleret)	2:36
4.	"Øl Øl" (featuring Trollfest)	2:36
5.	"Shai Shai" (featuring Nytt Land)	2:36
6.	"Birra Birra" (featuring Emilio Souto from Skiltron)	2:36
7.	"Пиво Пиво" (featuring Troll Bends Fir)	2:36
8.	"Pivo Pivo" (featuring Meri Tadić)	2:36
9.	"Μπύρα Μπύρα" (featuring Jesper Anastasiadis from Turisas)	2:36
10.	"Pivo Pivo" (featuring Milan Krištofik from Achsar)	2:36
11.	"Beer Kill Kill" (featuring Steve Souza from Exodus)	2:36
12.	"Beer Beer" (featuring Christopher Bowes from Alestorm)	2:36
13.	"Mellanöl" (featuring Viking Danielson from Svarta Ljuset)	2:36
14.	"Bier Bier" (featuring Heidevolk)	3:00
Total length:		36:48

=== Charts ===
Chart (2018)	Peak position
Austrian Albums (Ö3 Austria)	72
Finnish Albums (Suomen virallinen lista)	24
German Albums (Offizielle Top 100)	45
Swiss Albums (Schweizer Hitparade)	29

== Personnel ==
- Jonne Järvelä – vocals, acoustic guitar, mandolin, percussion, violaphone
- Kalle "Cane" Savijärvi – guitar, backing vocals
- Jarkko Aaltonen – bass
- Matti "Matson" Johansson – drums
- Sami Perttula – accordion
- Tuomas Rounakari – violin
