= Jylhä =

Studio album by Korpiklaani
- Released: 5 February 2021
- Studios: Sound Supreme Studios at Hämeenlinna, Finland; JonneMusic at Lahti
- Genre: Folk metal
- Length: 60:35
- Language: Finnish
- Label: Nuclear Blast
- Producer: Janne Saksa

Korpiklaani chronology
Kulkija (2018)	Jylhä (2021)	Rankarumpu (2024)

Professional ratings
Review scores
Source	Rating
Blabbermouth.net	8/10
Kerrang!	3/5
Louder Sound	3.5/5 stars
Metal Hammer Portugal	3/5

Jylhä (roughly translated as "majestic", or "wild and rugged in a beautiful way") is the eleventh studio album by Finnish folk metal band Korpiklaani, released on 5 February 2021. It is the band's first album with new drummer Samuli Mikkonen.

Although the album is considered folk metal, it saw the band incorporating sounds like thrash metal, power metal and even reggae and ska. Lyrically, the album features themes like folklore, nature, celebration and three murder stories, including the Lake Bodom murders.

In an interview with Slovak webzine Metalmania-Magazín, guitarist Kalle Savijärvi stated: "Mood was pretty much to the heavier direction as one of the first songs written was Niemi you mentioned. Samuli Mikkonen, our new drummer, brought some heaviness with his spectacular drumming."

== Reception ==
Jylhä received positive reviews from critics, who praised its lyrics and the band's musicianship. Roshan Machayya from Metal Wani wrote "Korpiklaani’s newest offering ‘Jylhä’ is a fun, trippy, and artistically well-rounded album. The arrangements, composition, and performance of the music on the album is a balanced representation of metal and ethnic folk music in the band’s experiences without a semblance of conflict". While Owen Edmonds from All About the Rock argued "I was surprised how much I enjoyed listening to an entire albums worth of music. To me, Korpiklaani are the perfect festival band. If you’ve ever been to Donnington or Bloodstock then you know those lazy Saturday afternoons when you’re on your 10th warm cider and having downed a foot long hot dog or one of those manky massive yorkshire puddings and you want to kick back".

Ralka Skjerseth of Metalriot.com wrote that "Jylhä has a magnificent resonance packed in a form of thirteen tracks..."

In a more positive to mixed review, José Cruz from Metal Hammer Portugal wrote "Jylhä is an album that has certainly improved over its predecessor, but has disappointed in many other ways. They earned points for trying something new, regardless of whether they work".

== Track listing ==
No.	Title	Length
1.	"Verikoira" (The Bloodhound)	6:19
2.	"Niemi" (The Cape)	3:42
3.	"Leväluhta"	3:50
4.	"Mylly" (The Mill)	4:43
5.	"Tuuleton" (The Windless)	5:50
6.	"Sanaton maa" (Speechless Ground)	4:29
7.	"Kiuru" (The Lark)	5:26
8.	"Miero" (The Unknown)	4:21
9.	"Pohja" (Rock Bottom)	4:28
10.	"Huolettomat" (The Careless)	4:16
11.	"Anolan aukeat" (Anola Plains)	3:05
12.	"Pidot" (Feast)	3:47
13.	"Juuret" (Roots)	6:19
Total length:		01:00:35

== Personnel ==
- Jonne Järvelä – vocals, acoustic guitar, mandolin, percussion, violaphone
- Kalle "Cane" Savijärvi – guitar, backing vocals
- Jarkko Aaltonen – bass
- Samuli Mikkonen – drums
- Sami Perttula – accordion
- Tuomas Rounakari – violin

== Charts ==
Chart performance for Jylhä
Chart (2021)	Peak position
Finnish Albums (Suomen virallinen lista)	6
German Albums (Offizielle Top 100)	61
Swiss Albums (Schweizer Hitparade)	29
