= Manala (album) =

Studio album by Korpiklaani
- Released: 3 August 2012
- Recorded: 2011 at Petrax Studios in Hollola, Finland; Wave Studio and Villvox Studio in Lahti, Finland
- Genre: Folk metal
- Length: 45:48
- Label: Nuclear Blast
- Producer: Aksu Hanttu

Korpiklaani chronology
Ukon Wacka (2011)	Manala (2012)	Noita (2015)

Singles from Manala
- 1. "Metsälle" Released: December 16, 2011; 2. "Kunnia" Released: July 20, 2012

Manala is the eighth studio album by Finnish folk metal band Korpiklaani. It was released on August 3, 2012 through Nuclear Blast. "Manala" translated from Finnish to English is "Underworld".

== Track listing ==
No.	Title	Lyrics	Music	Length
1.	"Kunnia"	Tuomas Keskimäki	Jonne Järvelä	3:25
2.	"Tuonelan tuvilla"	Jonne Järvelä	Jonne Järvelä	3:10
3.	"Rauta"	Tuomas Keskimäki	Jonne Järvelä	3:06
4.	"Ruumiinmultaa"	Juha Jyrkäs	Jonne Järvelä	3:37
5.	"Petoeläimen kuola"	Tuomas Keskimäki	Jonne Järvelä	3:15
6.	"Synkkä"	Tuomas Keskimäki	Jonne Järvelä	5:25
7.	"Ievan Polkka"	Eino Kettunen	traditional	3:08
8.	"Husky Sledge"	instrumental	Tuomas Rounakari	1:48
9.	"Dolorous"	instrumental	Jonne Järvelä	3:05
10.	"Uni"	Tuomas Keskimäki	Jarkko Aaltonen, Jonne Järvelä	3:49
11.	"Metsälle"	Jonne Järvelä	Jonne Järvelä	5:41
12.	"Sumussa hämärän aamun"	Tuomas Keskimäki	Jarkko Aaltonen, Jonne Järvelä	6:19
Total length:				45:48

Digipak bonus CD
No.	Title	Lyrics	Music	Length
1.	"Honor"	Tuomas Keskimäki	Jonne Järvelä	3:25
2.	"At the Huts of the Underworld"	Jonne Järvelä	Jonne Järvelä	3:10
3.	"The Steel"	Tuomas Keskimäki	Jonne Järvelä	3:06
4.	"Soil of the Corpse"	Juha Jyrkäs	Jonne Järvelä	3:37
5.	"The Predator's Saliva"	Tuomas Keskimäki	Jonne Järvelä	3:15
6.	"Dismal"	Tuomas Keskimäki	Jonne Järvelä	5:25
7.	"Ieva's Polka"	Eino Kettunen	traditional	3:08
8.	"Husky Sledge"	instrumental	Tuomas Rounakari	1:48
9.	"Dolorous"	instrumental	Jonne Järvelä	3:05
10.	"Dream"	Tuomas Keskimäki	Jarkko Aaltonen, Jonne Järvelä	3:49
11.	"Off to the Hunt"	Jonne Järvelä	Jonne Järvelä	5:40
Total length:				39:28

== Personnel ==
- Jonne Järvelä – vocals, guitar
- Jarkko Aaltonen – bass
- Matti "Matson" Johansson – drums
- Juho Kauppinen – accordion
- Tuomas Rounakari – violin
- Kalle "Cane" Savijärvi – guitar
