= Tales Along This Road =

Studio album by Korpiklaani
- Released: 21 April 2006
- Recorded: November–December 2005
- Genre: Folk metal
- Length: 42:29
- Languages: English, Finnish
- Label: Napalm
- Producers: Samu Oittinen, Jonne Järvelä

Korpiklaani chronology
Voice of Wilderness (2005)	Tales Along This Road (2006)	Tervaskanto (2007)

Professional ratings
Review scores
Source	Rating
AllMusic	4/5 stars

Tales Along This Road is the third studio album by Finnish folk metal band Korpiklaani. It was released on 21 April 2006 by Napalm Records.

== Track listing ==
All music composed by Jonne Järvelä. All lyrics written by Jonne Järvelä, except tracks 2, 4, 7 & 9 lyrics by Virva Holtiton, track 3 lyrics by Jarkko Aaltonen and track 8 lyrics by Jonne Järvelä, Virva Holtiton & Jarkko Aaltonen.

No.	Title	Length
1.	"Happy Little Boozer"	3:35
2.	"Väkirauta" (Strong Sword)	3:44
3.	"Midsummer Night"	3:27
4.	"Tuli kokko" (The Eagle Came)	5:25
5.	"Spring Dance"	3:05
6.	"Under the Sun"	4:12
7.	"Korpiklaani" (Forest Clan)	4:39
8.	"Rise"	5:20
9.	"Kirki" (Lust)	4:23
10.	"Hide Your Richess"	4:39
11.	"Free Like an Eagle" (limited edition bonus track)	3:26
Total length:		45:55

== Personnel ==
- Jonne Järvelä - vocals, guitars, mandolin
- Matti Johansson - drums, backing vocals
- Jarkko Aaltonen - bass
- Cane - guitars, backing vocals
- Juho Kauppinen - accordion, backing vocals, guitars
- Hittavainen - violin, jouhikko, tin whistle, recorder, torupill, mandolin, mouth harp

=== Guest musicians ===
- Samuel Dan - backing vocals
- Virva Holtiton - kantele, throat singing

=== Production ===
- Toni Härkönen - photography
- Mika Jussila - mastering
- Jonne Järvelä - producer
- Samu Oittinen - producer, recording, mixing
- Jan "Örkki" Yrlund - cover art, artwork
