= Noita (album) =

Studio album by Korpiklaani
- Released: 5 May 2015
- Recorded: 2014–2015 at Petrax-Studios, Hollola, Finland
- Genre: Folk metal
- Length: 50:31
- Language: Finnish
- Label: Nuclear Blast
- Producer: Aksu Hanttu

Korpiklaani chronology
Manala (2012)	Noita (2015)	Kulkija (2018)

Professional ratings
Review scores
Source	Rating
Blabbermouth.net	9/10 stars

Noita is the ninth studio album by Finnish folk metal band Korpiklaani. The title is the Finnish word for "witch", but is closer in meaning to "shaman," "witch-doctor," or "medicine man."

The track "Jouni Jouni" is a cover version of the song "Mony Mony" by Tommy James and the Shondells, which was notably covered by Billy Idol.

== Track listing ==
No.	Title	Length
1.	"Viinamäen mies" (Vineyard Man)	2:58
2.	"Pilli on pajusta tehty" (The Flute is Made of Willow)	2:42
3.	"Lempo"	5:35
4.	"Sahti" (Moonshine)	3:28
5.	"Luontoni" (My Nature)	3:01
6.	"Minä näin vedessä neidon" (I Saw a Maiden in the Water)	6:08
7.	"Jouni Jouni"	4:51
8.	"Kylästä keväinen kehto" (A Springlike Cradle from the Village)	4:41
9.	"Ämmänhauta" (Witch's Tomb)	5:17
10.	"Sen verran minäkin noita" (There's Some Witch in Me Too)	6:37
Total length:		50:31

Bonus track
No.	Title	Length
11.	"Antaja" (Giver)	5:13

== Personnel ==
- Jonne Järvelä – vocals, guitar
- Jarkko Aaltonen – bass
- Matti "Matson" Johansson – drums
- Sami Perttula – accordion
- Tuomas Rounakari – violin
- Kalle "Cane" Savijärvi – guitar
- Tuomas Keskimäki - Lyrics

== Charts ==
Chart (2015)	Peak position
Austrian Albums (Ö3 Austria)	70
Belgian Albums (Ultratop Flanders)	171
Belgian Albums (Ultratop Wallonia)	186
Finnish Albums (Suomen virallinen lista)	16
French Albums (SNEP)	158
German Albums (Offizielle Top 100)	46
Swiss Albums (Schweizer Hitparade)	61
