= Tautirut =

Bowed zither native to the Inuit culture of Canada

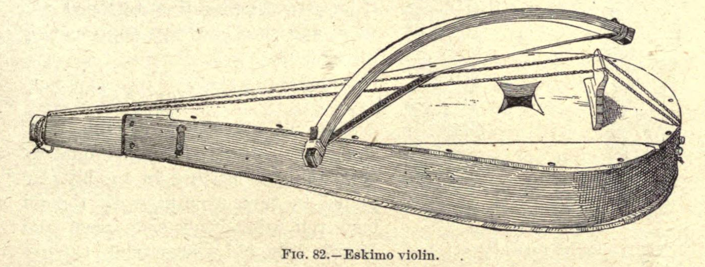
"Eskimo violin" from Hudson bay area.

The tautirut (Inuktitut syllabics: ᑕᐅᑎᕈᑦ or tautiruut, also known as the Eskimo fiddle) is a bowed zither native to the Inuit culture of Canada.

Lucien M. Turner described the "Eskimo violin" in 1894 as being

...made of birch or spruce, and the two strings are of coarse, loosely twisted sinew. The bow has a strip of whalebone in place of horsehair, and is resined with spruce gum. This fiddle is held across the lap when played.

The Canadian anthropologist Ernest William Hawkes described the tautirut in 1916:

It consists of a rude box, with a square hole in the top, three sinew strings with bridge and tail-piece and a short bow with a whalebone strip for hair. . . . Most Eskimo fiddles have only one string.

== Origin ==
The tautirut, along with the Apache fiddle are among the few First Nations chordophones which may possibly be pre-Columbian in origin. Ethnomusicologist Anthony Baines and others have noted the similarity of the tautirut to the Icelandic fiðla and Shetland gue.

Peter Cooke believed that the tautirut's limited distribution around the Hudson Bay area indicated that it was introduced to the Inuit by Hudson's Bay Company sailors from the Orkney and Shetland Islands.
