= Korven Kuningas =

Studio album by Korpiklaani
- Released: 21 March 2008
- Recorded: 2007
- Genre: Folk metal
- Length: 70:52
- Languages: English, Finnish
- Label: Nuclear Blast
- Producers: Samu Oittinen, Jonne Järvelä

Korpiklaani chronology
Tervaskanto (2007)	Korven Kuningas (2008)	Karkelo (2009)

Singles from Korven kuningas
- 1. "Keep On Galloping" Released: 14 February 2008

Professional ratings
Review scores
Source	Rating
AllMusic	4/5 stars

Korven Kuningas ("King of the Woods") is the fifth studio album by Finnish folk metal band Korpiklaani. It was released on 21 March 2008 through Nuclear Blast Records. A record deal was signed with the company in September 2007. The cover was painted on this album, unlike the last few album covers, which were created using Adobe Photoshop. It features the old man, Vaari, who was also present on the Tales Along This Road and Tervaskanto covers.

"Korven Kuningas" was released as a limited first edition with bonus tracks, along with being released on white colored vinyl. There is also a digipak version limited and numbered to 500 copies that came with a drinking horn on a wall holder.

== Track listing ==
All music is composed by Jonne Järvelä (except tracks 7, 12 and 13, by Juho Kauppinen).

No.	Title	Lyrics	Length
1.	"Tapporauta" ("Killing Iron")	Juha Jyrkäs	4:12
2.	"Metsämies" ("Forest Man")	Järvelä	2:59
3.	"Keep on Galloping"	Järvelä/Jyrkäs	4:07
4.	"Northern Fall"	Järvelä	3:04
5.	"Shall We Take a Turn?"	Järvelä	3:27
6.	"Paljon on koskessa kiviä" ("The Rapid Has Many Rocks")	Jyrkäs	3:44
7.	"Ali jäisten vetten" ("Under the Icy Waters")	Jyrkäs	4:09
8.	"Gods on Fire"	Järvelä	3:48
9.	"Nuolet nomalan" ("Rabbit Arrows", digipack bonus track)	Järvelä/Jyrkäs	3:02
10.	"Kantaiso" ("Ancestor")	Järvelä/Jyrkäs	4:04
11.	"Kipumylly" ("Mill of Pain")	Jyrkäs	3:52
12.	"Suden joiku" ("Yoik of the Wolf")	Jyrkäs	4:22
13.	"Runamoine"	Jyrkäs	4:02
14.	"Syntykoski syömmehessäin" ("Rapid of Birth from My Heart")	Jyrkäs	3:05
15.	"Korven kuningas" ("King of The Woods")	Järvelä	21:57
Total length:			73:54

- The Japanese edition replaces track 9 with "Kipakka" (4:17)

== Chart positions ==
Chart (2008)	Peak position
Finnish Albums Chart	16

== Personnel ==
- Jonne Järvelä - vocals, guitars, djembe
- Matti Johansson - drums
- Jarkko Aaltonen - bass
- Cane - guitars
- Juho Kauppinen - accordion, guitars
- Hittavainen - fiddle, viola, recorder, mandolin

=== Production ===
- Jan "Örkki" Yrlund - cover art
- Mika Jussila - mastering
- Jonne Järvelä - producer
- Samu Oittinen - producer, recording, mixing
- Harri Hinkka - photography
