= Rankarumpu =

Studio album by Korpiklaani
- Released: 5 April 2024
- Genre: Folk metal
- Length: 43:15
- Label: Nuclear Blast
- Producer: Janne Saksa

Korpiklaani chronology
Jylhä (2021)	Rankarumpu (2024)

Singles from Rankarumpu
- 1. "Saunaan" Released: 18 January 2024; 2. "Aita" Released: 15 February 2024; 3. "Oraakkelit" Released: 14 March 2024; 4. "Rankarumpu" Released: 5 April 2024

Rankarumpu ("Ragged Drum") is the twelfth studio album by Finnish folk metal band Korpiklaani. It was released on 5 April 2024 through Nuclear Blast and was produced by Janne Saksa.

== Critical reception ==
Professional ratings
Review scores
Source	Rating
Distorted Sound	7/10
Metal Hammer	3.5/5 stars
Metal Injection	(positive)

The album received generally positive reviews from critics. Sam Khaneka of Distorted Sound scored the album 7 out of 10 and wrote that the album "feels like Korpiklaani trying to find a careful balance of the two, with just enough variety to keep things interesting but without stepping far off their well beaten path." Writing for Metal Hammer, Holly Wright called the album "one of Korpiklaani's better latter-day albums that continues their legacy of authentic, Finnish revelry".

== Track listing ==
Rankarumpu track listing
No.	Title	Length
1.	"Kotomaa" (Homeland)	3:10
2.	"Tapa sen kun kerkeet" (Kill While You Can)	2:26
3.	"Aita" (Fence)	3:47
4.	"Saunaan" (Sauna)	3:18
5.	"Mettään" (Into the Woods)	4:19
6.	"Kalmisto" (March to the Grave)	4:22
7.	"Rankarumpu" (Ragged Drum)	2:43
8.	"No perkele" (Perkele)	3:58
9.	"Viikatelintu" (Reaper Bird)	3:21
10.	"Nouse" (Rise)	3:23
11.	"Oraakkelit" (Oracles)	3:12
12.	"Harhainen höyhen" (Lost Feather)	5:16
Total length:		43:15

== Personnel ==
Korpiklaani

- Jonne Järvelä – vocals, guitar
- Kalle "Cane" Savijärvi – guitar
- Jarkko Aaltonen – bass
- Samuli Mikkonen – drums
- Sami Perttula – accordion
- Olli Vänskä – violin

Additional personnel

- Janne Saksa – production

== Charts ==
Chart performance for Rankarumpu
Chart (2024)	Peak position
Finnish Albums (Suomen virallinen lista)	17
