= Icelandic fiddle =

String instrument

Fiðla
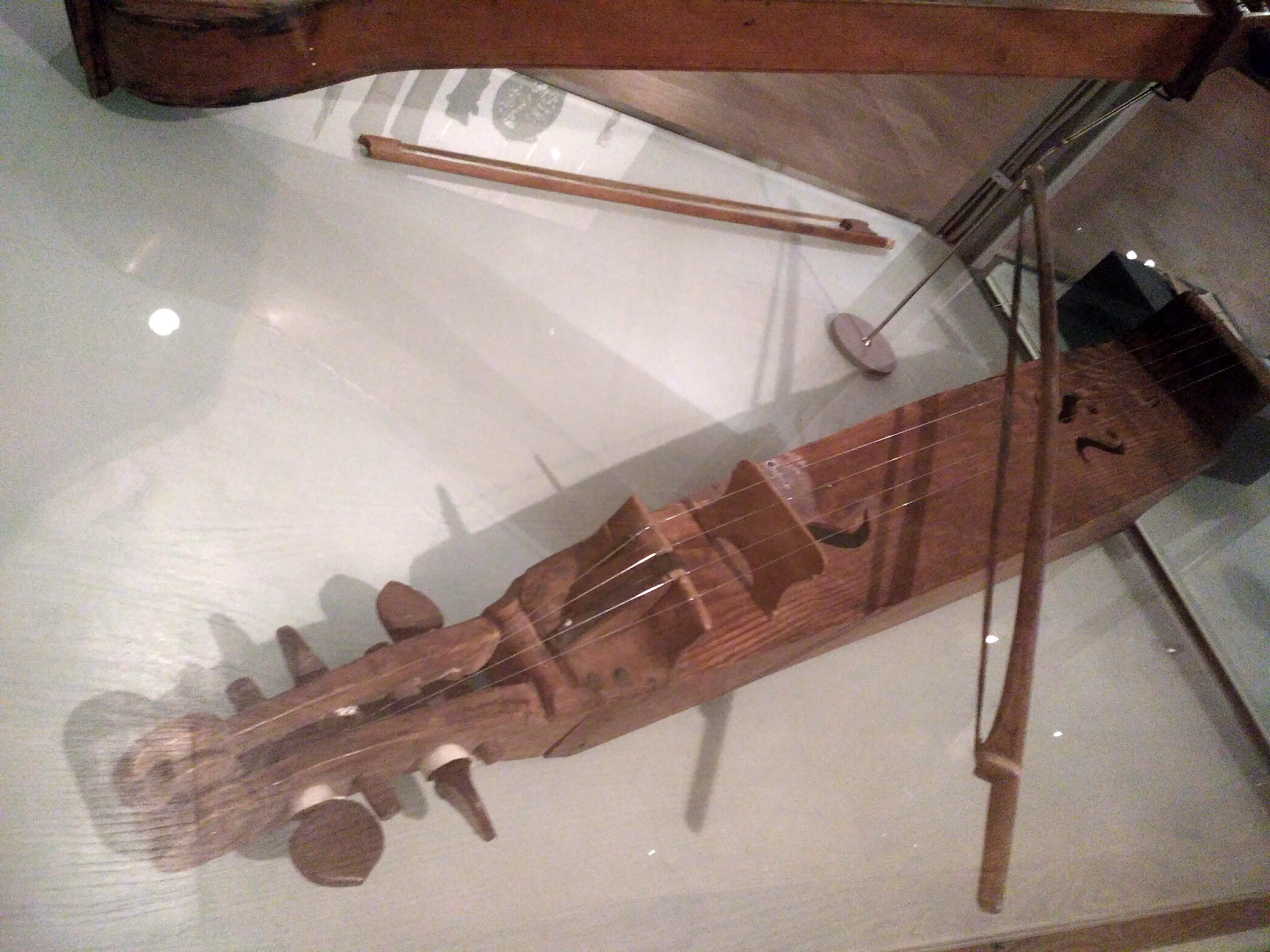
- Fiðla in the National Museum of Iceland in Reykjavík, Iceland

String instrument
- Classification: String instruments
- Hornbostel–Sachs classification: 321.321-6

Related instruments
- Langspil

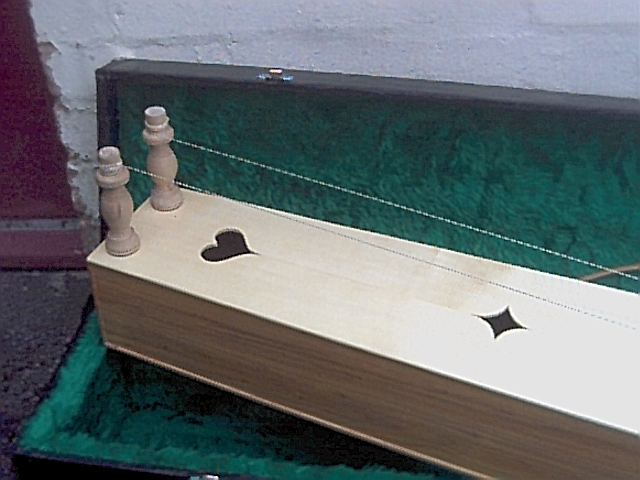
Peg area of an Icelandic fiddle

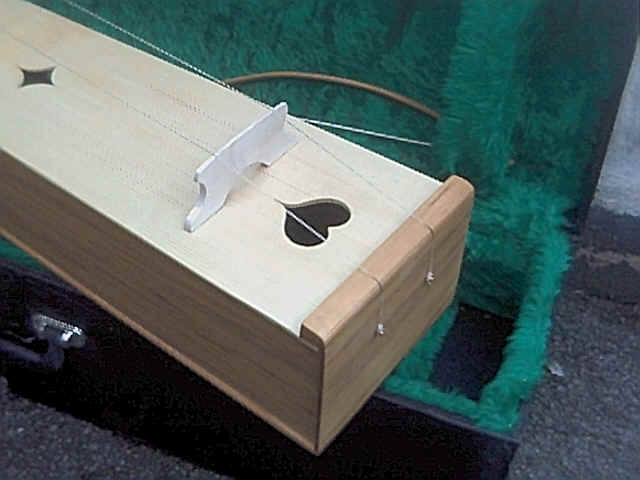
Bridge area of an Icelandic fiddle

The Icelandic fiddle (Icelandic: fiðla; Icelandic pronunciation: [ˈfɪðla]) is a traditional Icelandic instrument that can be described as a box with two brass strings which is played with a bow. The strings stretch across one end of the box to the other where they are tuned by two tuning pegs.

In English, the Icelandic fiddle may be referred to as a fiddle or violin. It was known to be used in the medieval ages when the King of Sweden kept both fiddle and harp players in his court. The fiddle has also been seen in the medieval cathedral of Nidaros in Norway, where statues of people playing the fiddle are displayed.

== History ==
The instrument was first introduced in a folktale in the 16th century, although it was not clearly described until the 18th century by Jón Ólafsson, who described the instrument as a cavernous box. Later in the 18th century, the Swedish explorer Uno von Troil visited Iceland in 1722, where he wrote about a langspil and fiddle and noted that both were played with bows. Displayed in the National Museum of Iceland is a drawing of the famous fiðla player, Sveinn Þórarinsson. Not much else is known about the instrument and its uses began to die out by the middle of the 19th century.

== Construction and design ==
The fiðla is a long box made up of thin wood that is about 78 cm long and narrows from 17 cm on one end to 14 cm on the other end. Each of the tuning pegs which are about 13 cm long are at the bottom end of the instrument. Each of the two strings on the fiðla are nailed in on each side to make the strings parallel to the fiðla.

One 19th century author described it as a "rudely fashioned instrument" having six strings of copper or brass wire. It is somewhat similar to the Icelandic langspil instrument.

== Similar instruments ==
- Gue, a lost Shetland instrument which may have resembled the Icelandic fiðla
- Langspil
- Tautirut, a bowed zither played by the Inuit of Hudson Bay
