= Rauno Esa Nieminen =

Finnish musician

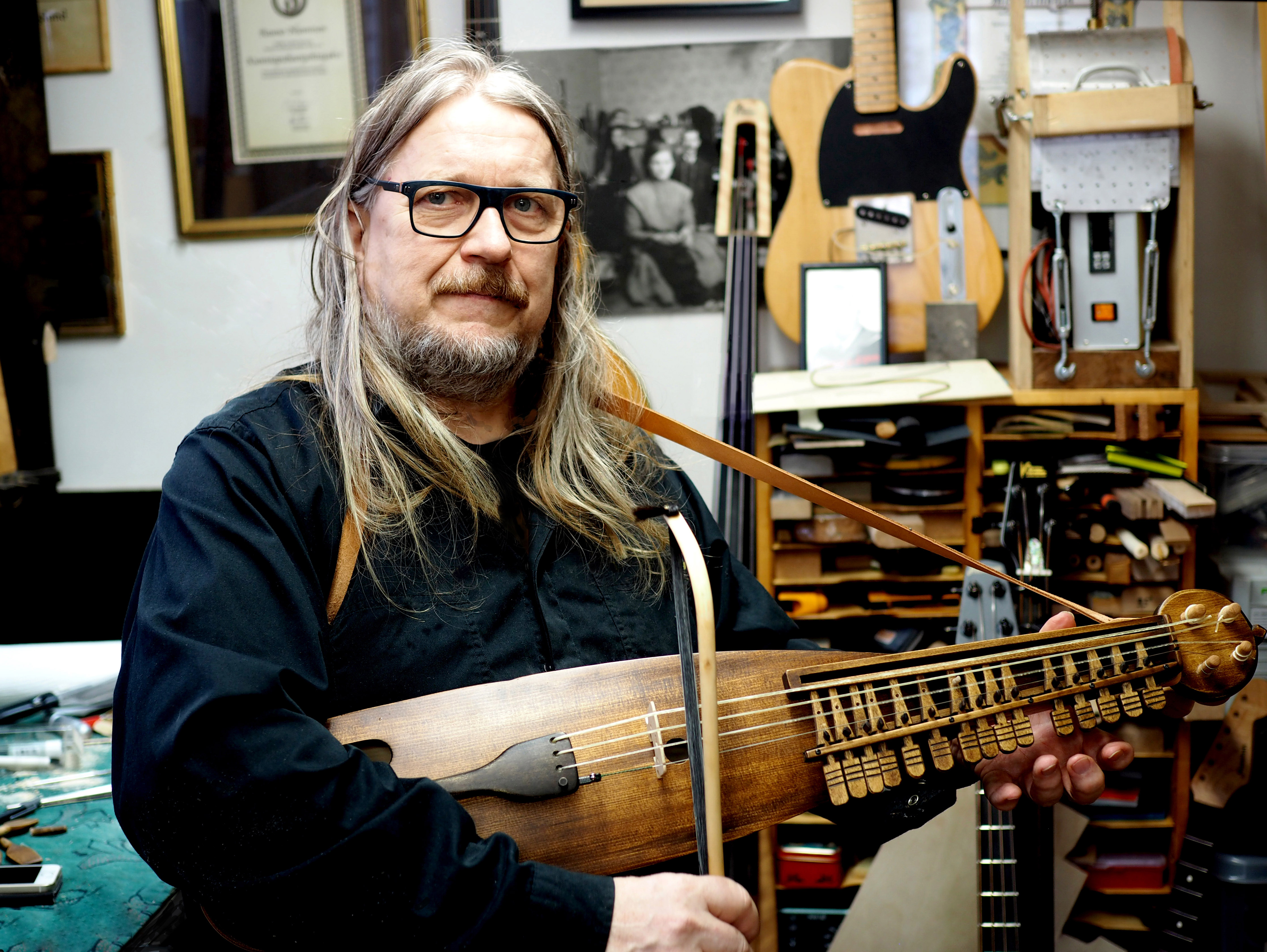
- Born: June 6, 1955 (age 71); Vilppula, Finland
- Education: Sibelius Academy
- Scientific career
- Fields: musical instrument making
- Workplaces: Sibelius Academy, University of the Arts Helsinki
- Thesis: Studying Musical Instruments by Building Them – The Jouhikko as an Example (2008)
- Doctoral advisor: Heikki Laitinen

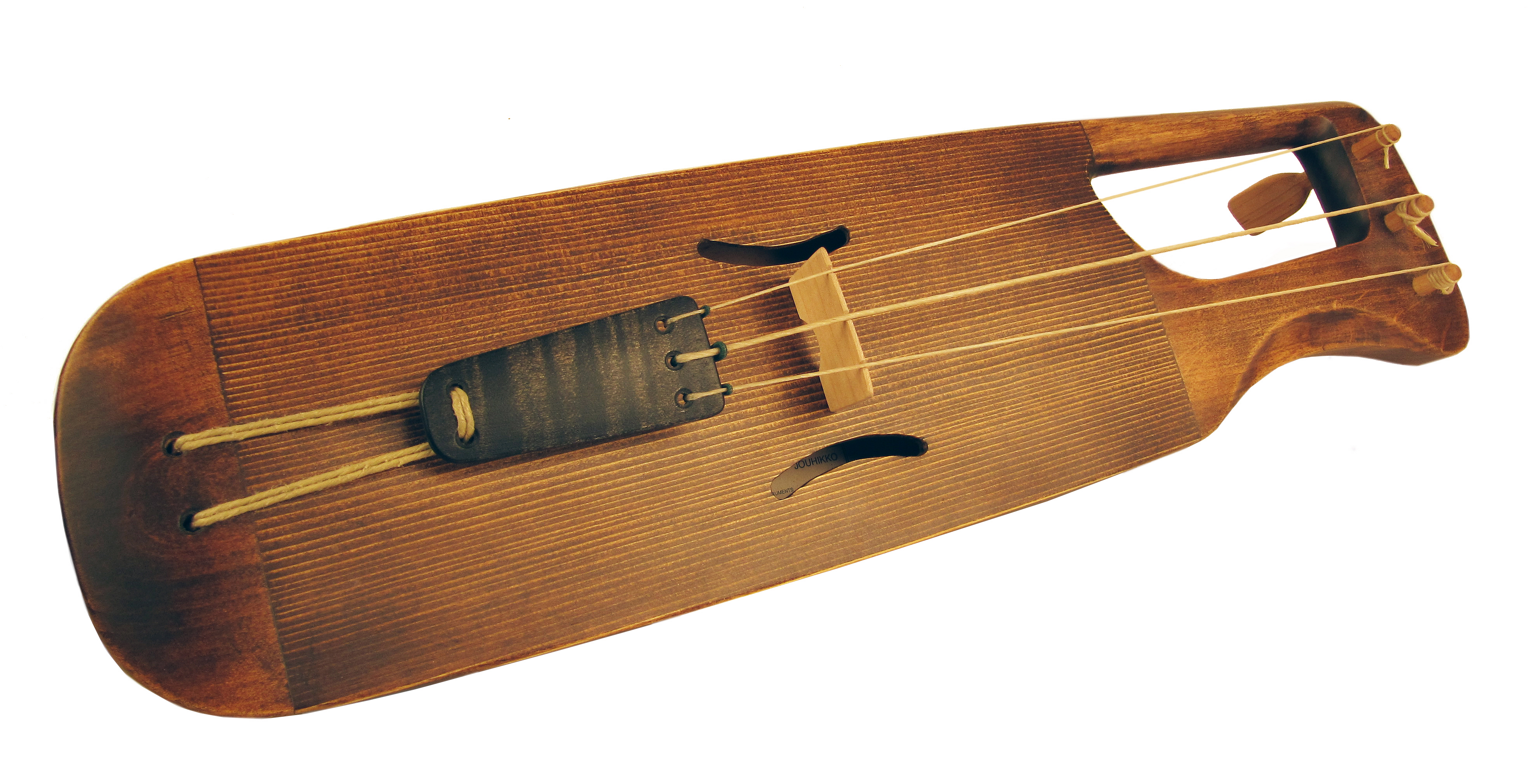
Bowed Lyre

Rauno Esa Nieminen (born June 6, 1955) is a doctor of music 2008, a master of musical instrument building 2006, designer (University of Applied Sciences) 2001, teacher of Arts and Crafts 1991, writer, artist, researcher and musician.

The work of Musical Instrument Builder and Musician started in 1978 Vilppula, Kolho village. He taught guitar building at Ikaalinen Craft and Applied Arts School during 1984–2018. He is still a teacher at Sibelius Academy and University of the Arts Helsinki.

The subject of the dissertation was Soitinten tutkiminen rakentamalla – Esimerkkinä jouhikko (Studying Musical Instruments by Building Them – The Jouhikko as an Example).

He plays kantele, horsehair kantele, wind instruments, percussion instruments, guitars, mandolins and bowed lyres (jouhikko). He has performed in more than 20 countries, including Europe, America, Asia and Africa. Call eg. in the following orchestras: Ontrei, Ural Pop, Verde, Jouhiorkesteri, Teppanan Veljet, Stroka & Nieminen, Primo, Pohjola-trio, World Mänkeri Orchestra.

He has been a full-time musical instrument maker since 1979 at Jyrki Pölkki Musical Workshop 1979–1980, Kaustinen Musical Workshop 1981–1983, Landola Guitars 1992–1999 and Trade Name Rauno Nieminen 1980. He builds guitars, mandolins, bass guitars, kanteles, brass instruments and horsehair kanteles. He is an honorary member of The European Guitar Builders 2016 and an Honorary Chairman of the Finnish Guitar Builders Guild 2015.

He has written numerous books, audio records and magazine articles.

== Education ==
Nieminen studied at the Sibelius Academy, where he obtained a Doctor of Arts in Music in 2008.

=== Thesis publications ===
- Nieminen, Rauno (2008). Soitinten tutkiminen rakentamalla – Esimerkkinä jouhikko (Soitinten tutkiminen rakentamalla – Esimerkkinä jouhikko. (Studying Musical Instruments by Building Them – The Jouhikko as an Example), Sibelius-Akatemian kansanmusiikinosaston julkaisuja 12 (Publications of the Sibelius Academy Folk Music Department 12), 209 pages. ISBN 978-952-5531-48-0. (Doctoral Thesis)

== Selected works ==
- Nieminen, Rauno (2017). Jouhikko – The Bowed Lyre. Sibelius Academy Folk Music Publications 28, Finnish Folk Music Institute Publications 61. ISBN 978-952-68365-2-2. Archived from the original on 2019-08-23.
- Heikkilä, Johannes & Nieminen, Rauno (2015). 30 vuotta ammatillista soitinrakennuskoulutusta Suomessa, IKATA 1984–2014. (30 years of professional musical instrument training in Finland, IKATA 1984–2014). ISBN 978-952-68365-0-8.
- Kastinen, Arja & Nieminen, Rauno & Tenhunen, Anna-Liisa (2013). Kizavirzi, karjalaisesta kansanperinteestä 1900-luvun alussa. (Kizavirzi, on the Karelian folklore of the early 20th century), Temps Oy, Pöytyä, Finland. ISBN 978-952-93-2165-0. Archived from the original on 2019-10-06.
- Nieminen, Rauno & Väänänen, Timo & Rossander, Meri-Anna (2011). Kantele eläväksi. (The Kantele comes alive), Kantele eläväksi -hanke, Nurmeksen museo (The Kantele comes alive project, Nurmes Museum), Nurmes, Finland. ISBN 978-951-96797-3-0.
- Nieminen, Rauno (2005). "Jousisitra ja Porthanin harpu". Etnomusikologian Vuosikirja. 17. The Yearbook of Ethnomusicology, vol. 17, s. 115–144: 115–144. doi:10.23985/evk.101165.
- Nieminen, Rauno (1984). Viisikielisen kanteleen rakennuspiirustuksia. (Building drawings of a five string kantele), Kansanmusiikki-instituutti (Folk Music Institute), Kaustinen, Finland. ISBN 951-95411-1-X.
