= Jouhikko =

Finnish and Karelian lyre

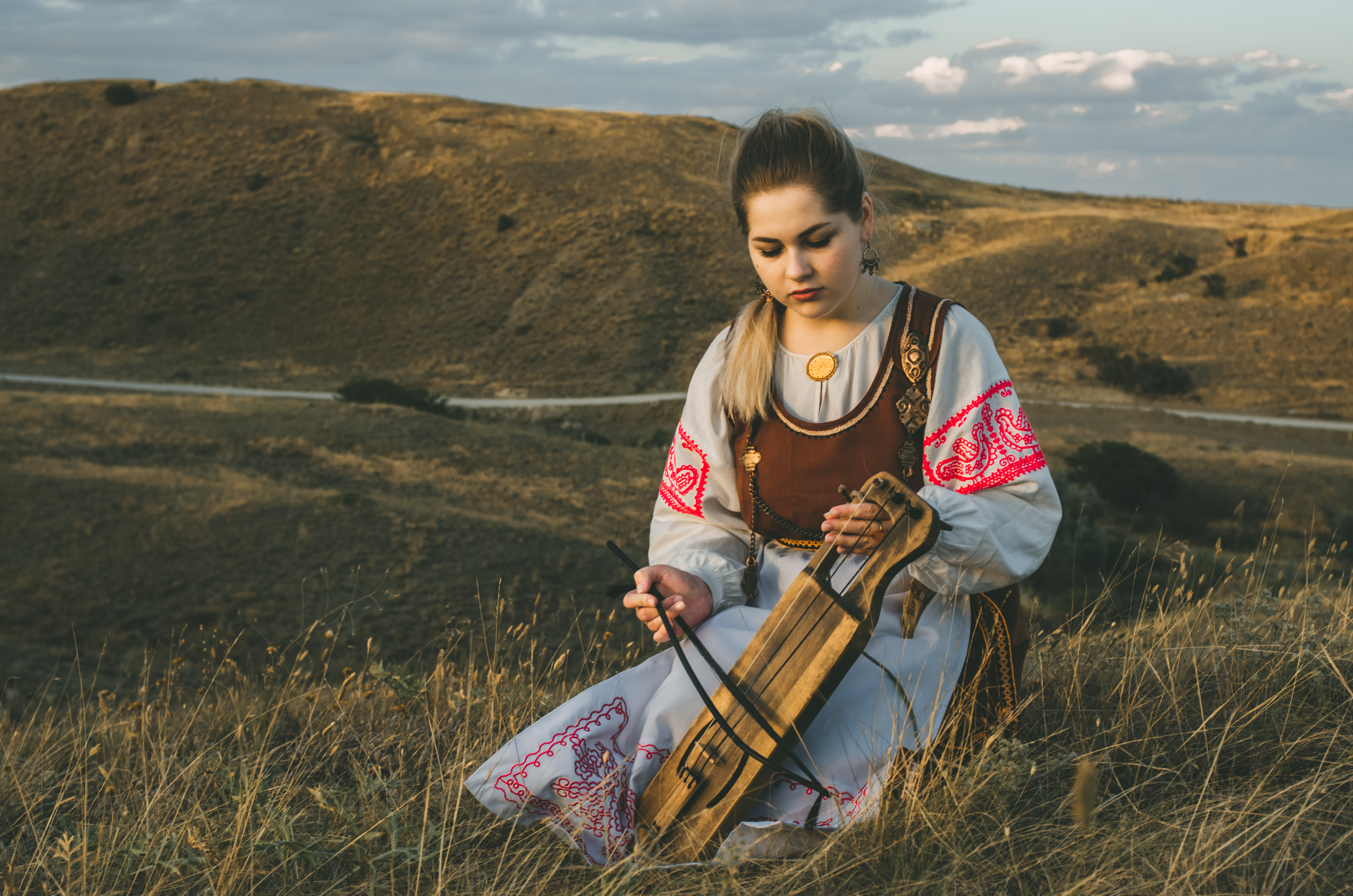
- Karelian woman playing a jouhikko

String instrument
- Classification: Bowed string instrument
- Hornbostel–Sachs classification: 321.22-71 Yoke lutes (Instruments in which sound is produced by one or more vibrating strings, in which the resonator and string bearer are physically united, and the strings run in a plane parallel to the sound table, the strings are attached to a yoke that consists of a cross-bar and two arms, with the yoke lying in the same plane as the sound-table, the resonator is a built up box, and the instrument is played with a bow.)

Related instruments
- lyre; Crwth; Stråkharpa; Talharpa; Gue

The jouhikko (Finnish: [ˈjou̯hikːo]) is a traditional, two- or three-stringed bowed lyre, from Finland and Karelia. Its strings are traditionally of horsehair. The playing of this instrument died out in the early 20th century but has been revived and there are now a number of musicians playing it.

== Name ==
The Jouhikko is also called jouhikannel (Finnish: [ˈjo̞u̯çiˈkɑ̝nːe̞l]) or jouhikantele (Finnish: [ˈjo̞u̯çiˈkɑ̝n̪t̪e̞le̞ʔ]), meaning a bowed kantele. In English, the usual modern designation is bowed lyre, although the earlier preferred term bowed harp is also used. There are different names for the instrument in different languages.

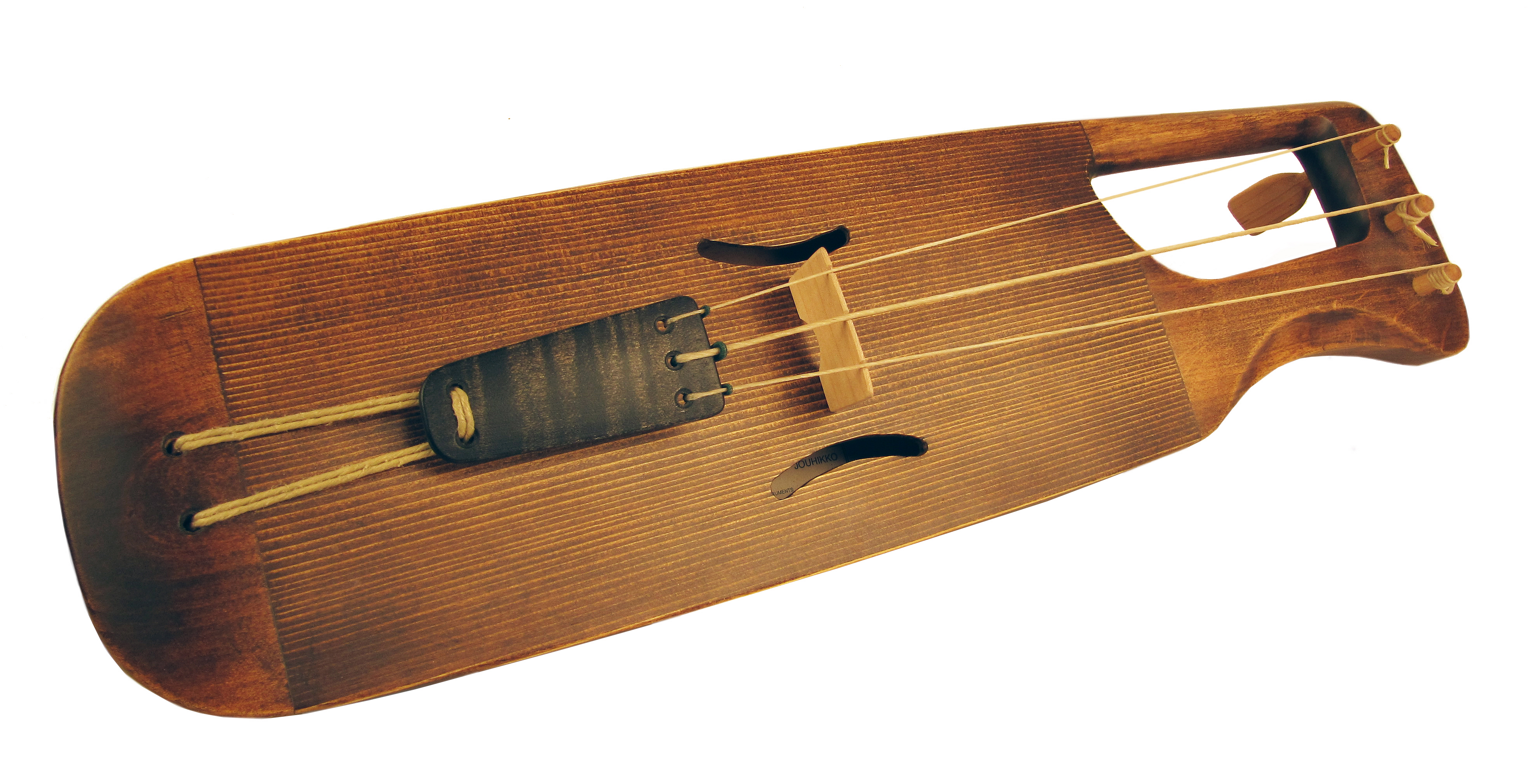
Three-string jouhikko made by Rauno Nieminen

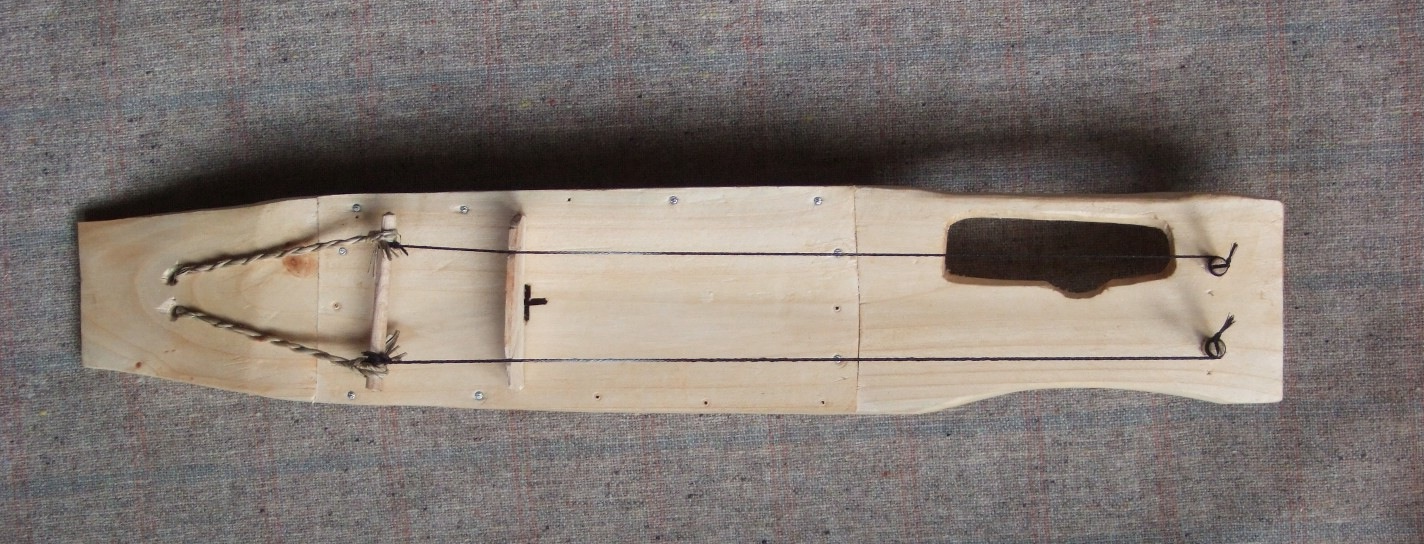
A Chadwick jouhikko

== History ==
Perhaps the earliest definite depiction of this kind of instrument is the stone carving from Trondheim Cathedral, Norway, dating from the second quarter of the 14th century.

18th-century writers in Latin mention instruments that seem to be a jouhikko, but the first illustration comes from c. 1830 CE. Folk music collectors in the late 19th and early 20th century visited players in Finland and Karelia, and collected instruments, noted tunes, made field recordings and took photographs.

== Repertory ==
The jouhikko repertory was mostly collected in the field by A. O. Väisänen from 1913 to 1931. The jouhikko was used for playing dance music, and the collected tunes are very short, and were largely improvised. The scale of the jouhikko is only 6 notes, with a constantly sounding drone.

== Tuning ==
In a three-string jouhikko, the middle string, or in a two-string instrument, the lower or left hand string, is the drone string. Absolute pitch is not fixed, but in Nieminen's charts this is given the note d. The upper or right hand string, passing over the finger-hole, is fingered to give a scale, and this scale typically runs upwards from the note a 4th above the drone, or in Nieminen's charts, g a b c d e. The third or left hand string can be tuned down to a lower drone, or up to provide one of the melody notes.

== Playing technique ==
The strings are stopped by touching them with the back of the fingers (the knuckles or nails), as there is no fingerboard to press the strings against. This fingering method is rather similar to the igil or the sarangi which also lack fingerboards. To touch the melody string the hand is inserted through a hole in the flat wooden board that makes up the top third of the instrument.

On a 3-string instrument tuned g-d-a, the first note of the scale is played on the g string, which cannot be fingered as it lies on the far side of the drone and out of reach of the hand hole. The second note is the a string played open. The third, fourth, fifth and sixth notes of the scale are played with the backs of the four fingers, stopping the a string. Whilst it is possible to play higher notes by moving the hand further up the string all the traditional melodies are within a compass of six notes, the first six notes of either a major or minor scale.

== Modern revival ==
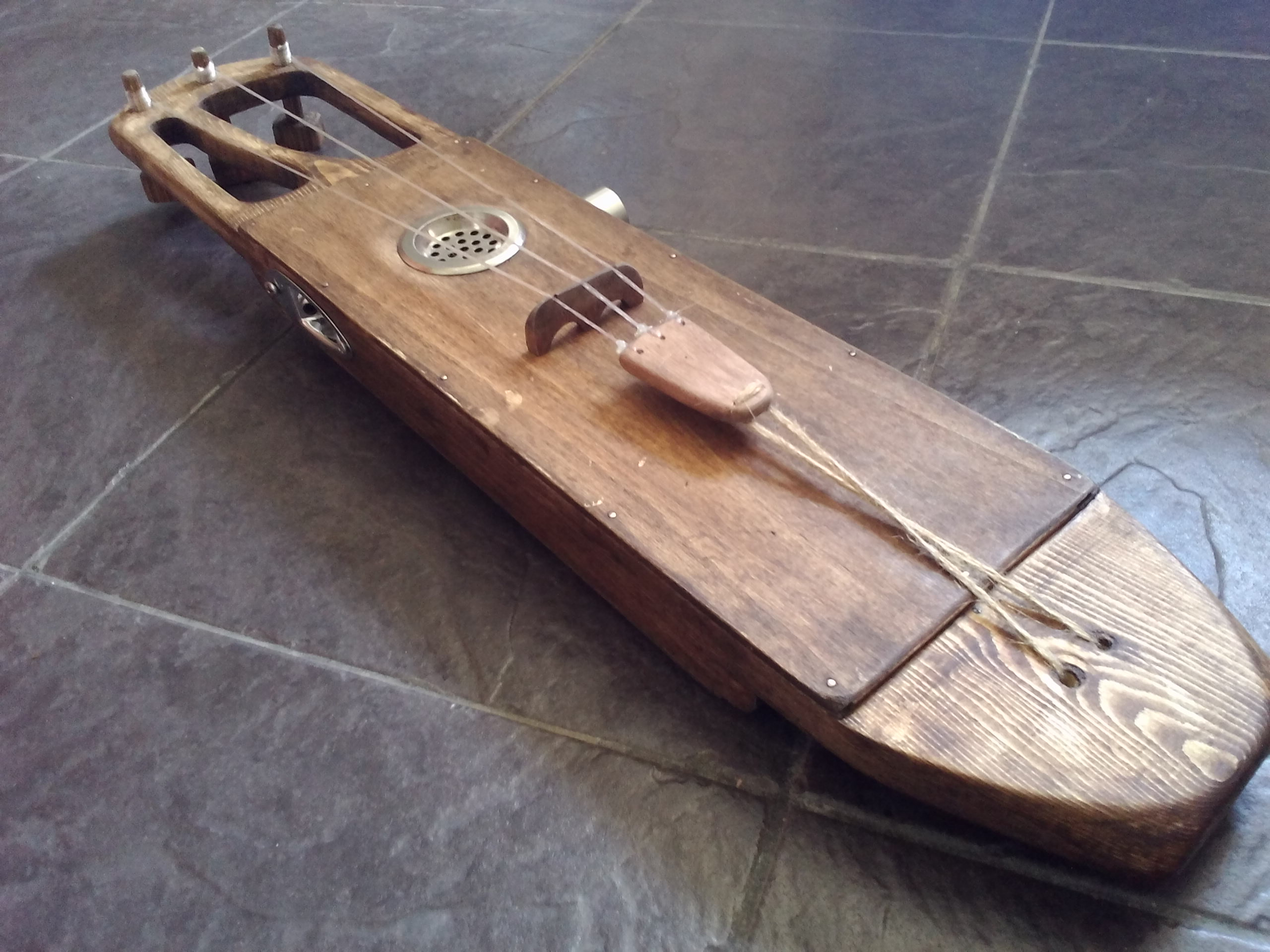
Acoustic Jouhikko by Charlie Bynum, Silver Spoon Music, NL. 2014

Modern instruments are made with horsehair, nylon, gut or even metal viola strings . Following Estonian talharpa technique, the hand hole is often made larger so that the hand can be inserted between the first and second strings, stopping the first with the insides of the fingers and the second with the outside

The most prominent recent use of the jouhikko is the Finnish folk band Jouhiorkesteri, whose member Rauno Nieminen is considered to be the modern master of the instrument. Other bands using jouhikko include Finnish folk metal band Korpiklaani and dark folk band Noiduin, and Estonian folk metal bands Raud-Ants and Metsatöll.

Kvitrafn (Einar Selvik) of the Norwegian band Wardruna uses his own made Jouhikko on their 2009 album Runaljod – Gap Var Ginnunga.

The Jouhikko sound has been recently popularized in performances by the traditional Siberian/Norse folk music of 'Nyttland' and also in the dark age trance music from Celtic duo 'Primordia'.

== Related instruments ==
The jouhikko is a member of a family of bowed lyre type instruments that stretches from Russia in the east, through Scandinavia, to Britain and Ireland. Most of these regions have only very sketchy evidence about their extinct bowed lyre traditions. The four-stringed Estonian talharpa and hiiu kannel have a wider hand hole and can play a wider range and shifting drones. The Welsh crwth is the most developed of this family to survive, with six strings, a fingerboard, and a complex playing style. Extinct or obscure variants include the Shetland gue and the English crowd. Other instruments are perhaps less closely related, including the bowed zithers such as the Finnish harppu, Icelandic fiðla, and the North American Inuit tautirut.

== See also ==
- Music of Finland
