= Ukon Wacka =

Studio album by Korpiklaani
- Released: 4 February 2011
- Studios: Petrax Studio, Hollola, Lahti, Finland
- Genre: Folk metal
- Length: 41:07
- Language: Finnish
- Label: Nuclear Blast
- Producer: Asku Hanttu

Korpiklaani chronology
Karkelo (2009)	Ukon Wacka (2011)	Manala (2012)

Singles from Ukon Wacka
- 1. "Ukon Wacka" Released: 21 December 2010; 2. "Tequila" Released: 15 February 2011

Ukon Wacka is the seventh studio album by Finnish folk metal band Korpiklaani. It was released on 4 February 2011 through Nuclear Blast. The title refers to an ancient pagan sacrificial feast, dedicated to Ukko. The album is sung in their native language.

== Track listing ==
No.	Title	Length
1.	"Louhen yhdeksäs poika" (Louhi's ninth son)	3:23
2.	"Päät pois tai hirteen" (Head off, or the Gallows)	3:14
3.	"Tuoppi oltta" (A pint of Beer)	3:34
4.	"Lonkkaluut" (Hip Bones)	5:39
5.	"Tequila"	2:42
6.	"Ukon wacka"	5:08
7.	"Korvesta liha" (Wilderness Meat)	4:31
8.	"Koivu ja tähti" (The Birch and the Star)	4:17
9.	"Vaarinpolkka" (Grandfather's Polka)	2:19
10.	"Surma" (Death)	6:20
11.	"Iron Fist" (Motörhead cover; bonus track)	2:52

- Tracks 1, 3, 6, 8 and 10 lyrics by Juha Jyrkäs, music by Jonne Järvelä.
- Track 2 lyrics by Järvelä, music by Timo Nikki/Teijo Kettula/Teijo Erkinharju.
- Track 4 lyrics by Hellevi Hiltunen/Juha "Korppi" Jaakkola, music by Järvelä.
- Tracks 5, 7 and 9 lyrics and music by Jonne Järvelä.
- Track 2 is a cover of Peer Günt's "Bad Boys Are Here".
- Vocals on track 6 by Tuomari Nurmio.

== Personnel ==
- Jonne Järvelä - lead vocals, electric & acoustic guitars, mandolin
- Jarkko Aaltonen - bass
- Matti "Matson" Johansson - drums, backing vocals
- Juho Kauppinen - accordion, backing vocals, guitars
- Jaakko "Hittavainen" Lemmetty - acoustic and electric violin, jouhikko, tin-whistle, recorder, torupill (bagpipe), mandolin, mouth harp
- Kalle "Cane" Savijärvi - guitars, backing vocals
