= Korpiklaani =

Finnish folk metal band

Background information
- Also known as: Shamaani Duo (1993–1997); Shaman (1997–2003)
- Origin: Lahti, Finland
- Genre: Folk metal
- Years active: 1993–present
- Labels: Nuclear Blast, Napalm
- Members: Jonne Järvelä; Kalle "Cane" Savijärvi; Jarkko Aaltonen; Sami Perttula; Samuli Mikkonen; Olli Vänskä
- Past members: Maaren Aikio; Juke Eräkangas; Ilkka Kilpeläinen; Tero Piirainen; Samu Ruotsalainen; Janne G`thaur; Hosse Latvala; Veera Muhli; Toni Näykki; Henri "Trollhorn" Sorvali; Matti "Matson" Johansson; Jaakko "Hittavainen" Lemmetty; Toni "Honka" Honkanen; Ali Määttä; Arto Tissari; Juho Kauppinen; Teemu Eerola; Tuomas Rounakari
- Website: korpiklaani.com

Korpiklaani (Finnish for The Backwoods Clan) is a Finnish folk metal band from Lahti that was formerly known as Shamaani Duo and Shaman.

== History ==
=== Shamaani Duo ===
Korpiklaani started with folk music before turning metal. The roots of Korpiklaani can be traced back to a Sámi folk music group under the name of "Shamaani Duo", an "in house restaurant band" created by Jonne Järvelä in 1993. An album of folk music (Hunka Lunka) was released under this name before Järvelä relocated and "Shamaani Duo" morphed into "Shaman".

=== Shaman ===
Shaman formed in 1997, and was notable for the heavy use of original native Sámic music elements and lyrics in Northern Sámi. The band's music was based on the folk music of Shamaani Duo. The most widely used elements were the shamanic drum, yoik and humppa. Besides yoik, the vocals varied from clean to rather aggressive growling.

The musical style of Shaman was quite distinctive, especially in slow songs, due to its entrancing atmosphere created by the monophonic, "narrow" synth sound making the deep contrast to the spacious sound of the acoustic guitar, the shamanic drum and yoik singing.

The first recording released under the name of Shaman was the demo single Ođđa máilbmi (New World in Northern Sámi). The video clip shot for the song featured a wolf breaking free from its cage and running into the forest. Besides the single CD the song was included on the band's first full-length album Idja (Night in Northern Sámi, 1999) as well.

The band released another album, Shamániac, in 2002.

=== Korpiklaani ===
In 2003, Shaman became Korpiklaani (with only Järvelä and drummer Samu Ruotsalainen remaining from the previous Shaman lineup), changing the music style to a more conventional folk metal with folk/thrash vocals instead of yoiking. Shamániac had already featured a strong resemblance to the future Korpiklaani style, with the song "Vuola lávlla" sharing musical Korpiklaani song, "Beer Beer".

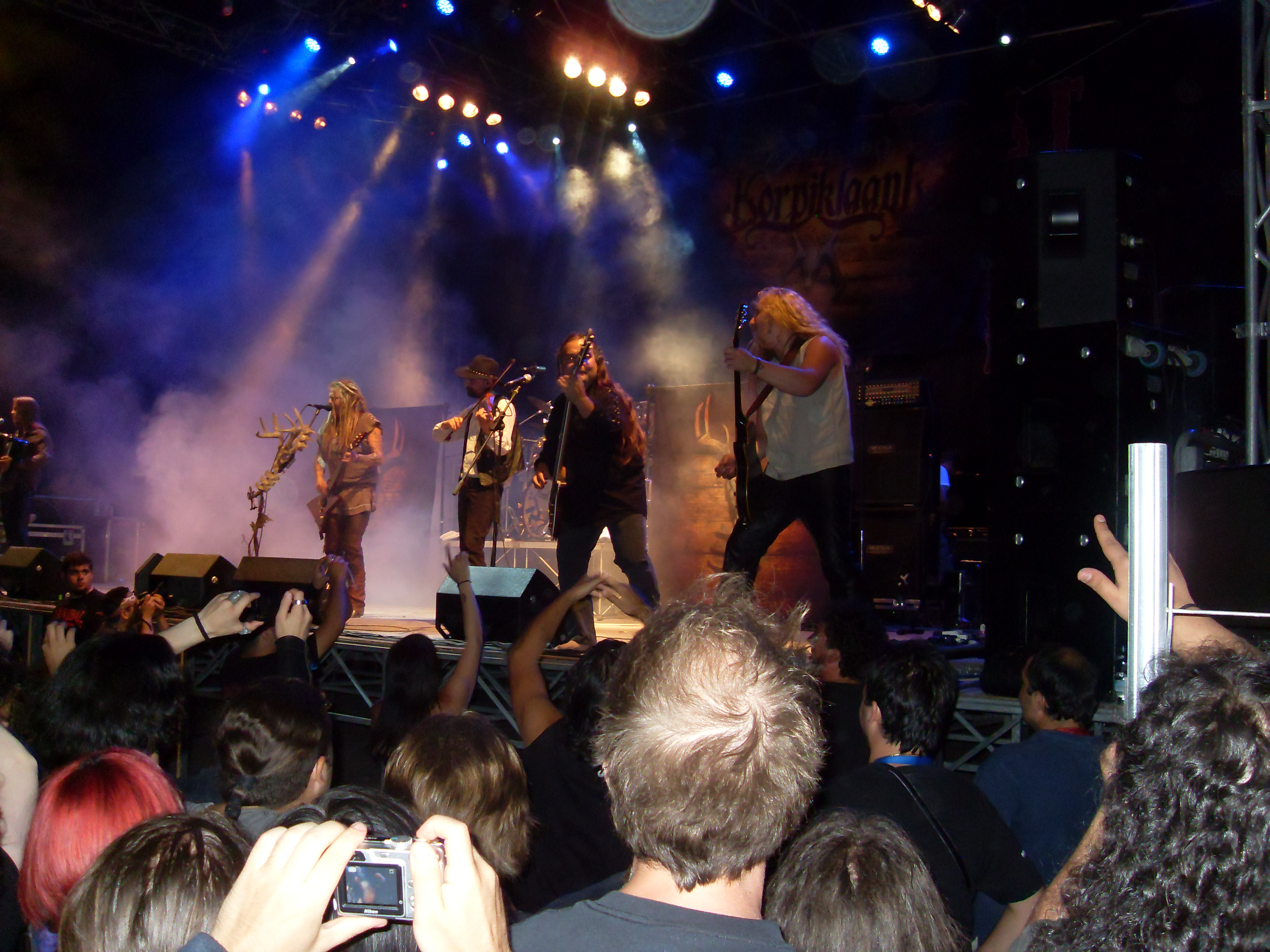
Korpiklaani at the Agglutination Metal Festival 2010

Jonne Järvelä credits his work with Finntroll as the catalyst for the shift in emphasis from folk to metal. Their song lyrics are often related to alcohol and partying. In their first three albums, most of their songs were in English and only a few in Finnish. However, in the following releases this changed, with most of the songs in their latest albums being sung in Finnish.

According to Jonne Järvelä, Korpiklaani's music would be seen as "old people's music with heavy metal guitars" in Finland.

There has been some collaboration between Korpiklaani and Finntroll, as Samu Ruotsalainen of Finntroll provided session drums for their debut album Spirit of the Forest and Järvelä provided the yoiking for the title track of Finntroll's album Jaktens Tid.

Juha Jyrkäs has written some Finnish lyrics to Korpiklaani and from 2011 lyrics are written by poet Tuomas Keskimäki, who writes lyrics in the old Finnish "kalevalametre".

The name Korpiklaani means "Backwoods Clan" in the Finnish language. In spoken language "korpi" means dark old forest. In biology it refers to boreal forest appearing on moist moraine soils, characterized by dense growth of spruce and a deep layer of moss as undergrowth.

In September 2011, Korpiklaani announced that Jaakko "Hittavainen" Lemmetty would be leaving the band due to personal health issues which made the constant touring and recording impossible. His replacement was violist Teemu Eerola, then Tuomas Rounakari until 2022. Rounakari was later replaced by former Turisas violinist Olli Vänskä. In 2013 accordion player Juho Kauppinen left Korpiklaani and was replaced with Sami Perttula.

== Band members ==
Korpiklaani live at Rocklharz Open Air 2019

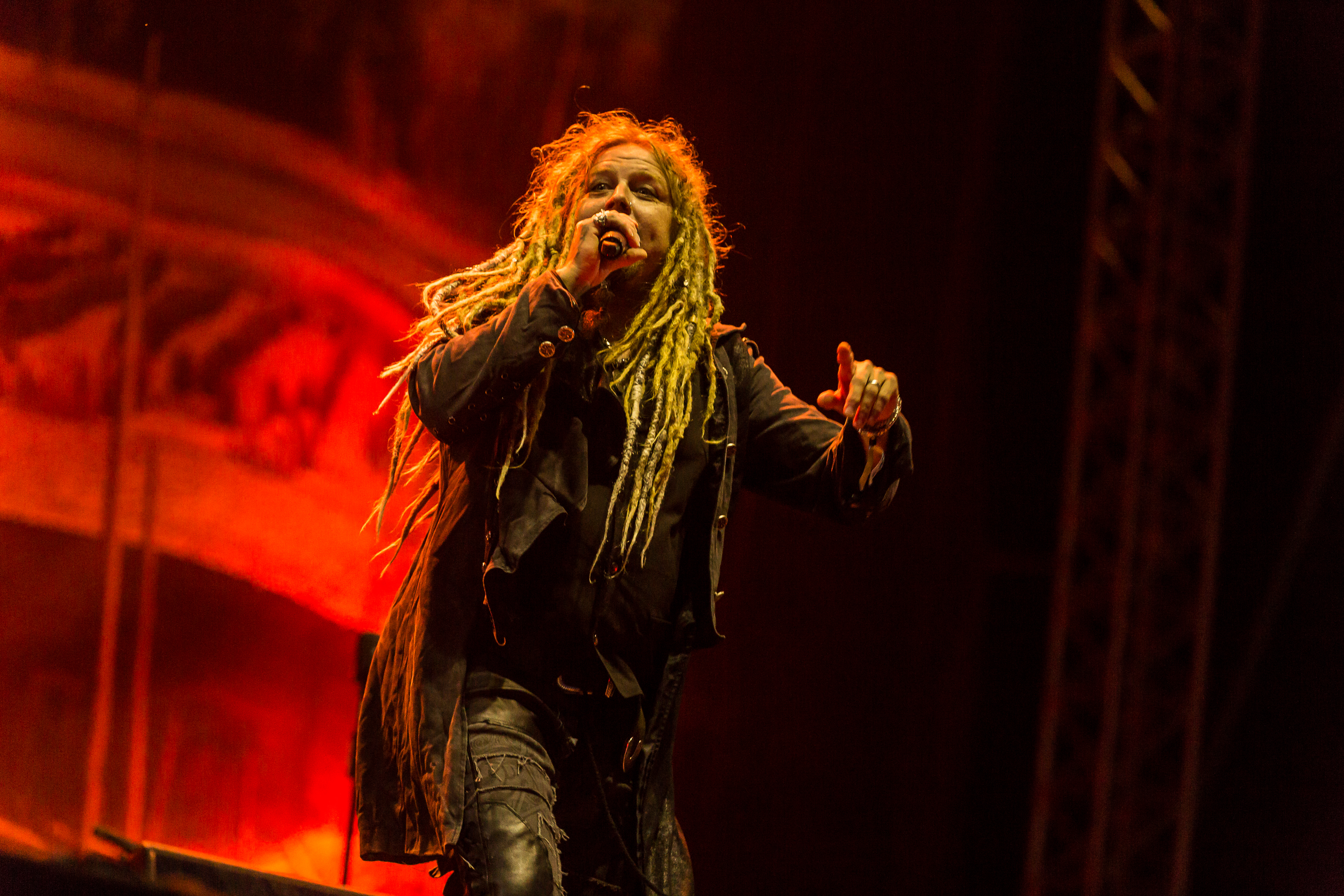
Jonne Järvelä

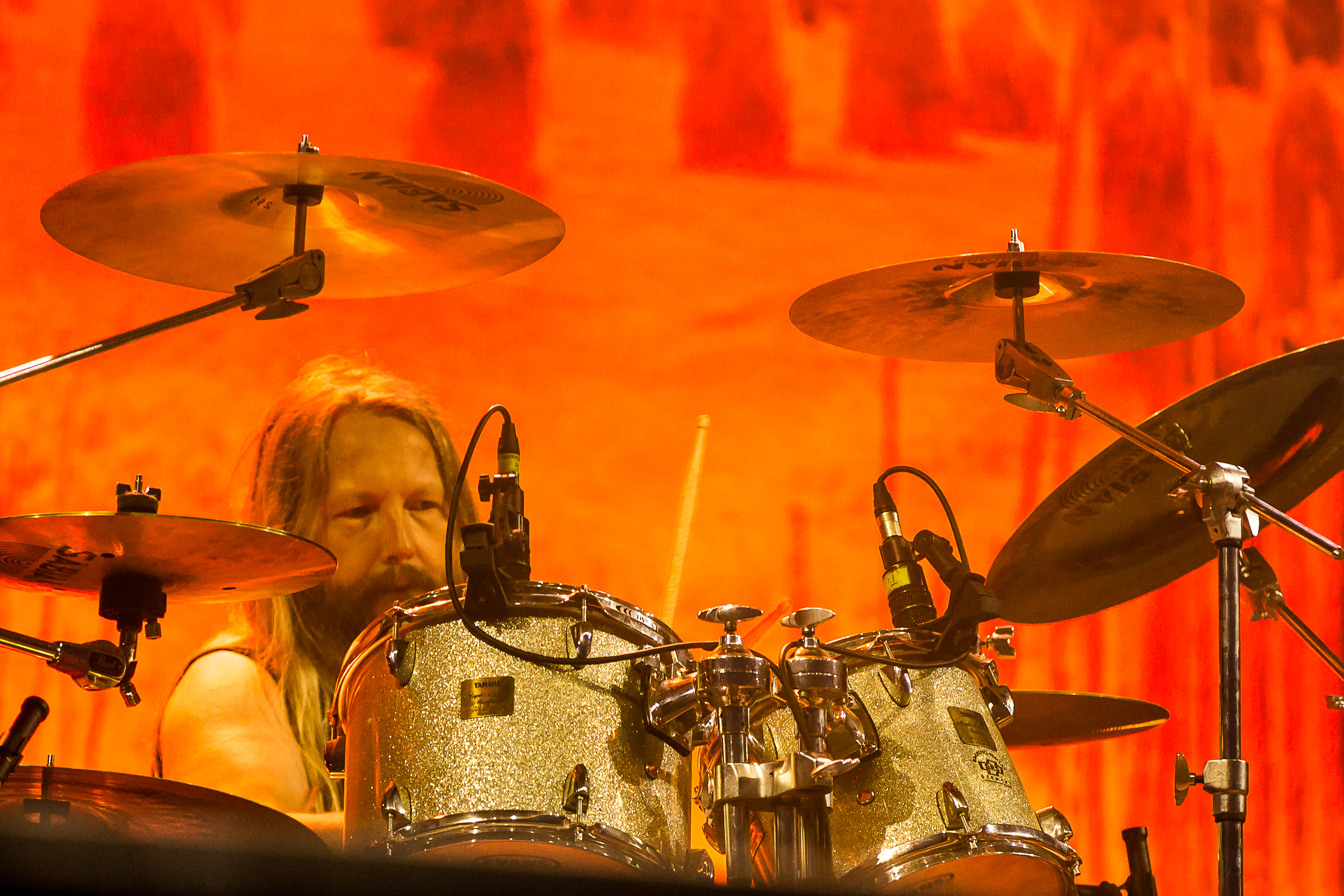
Matti "Matson" Johansson

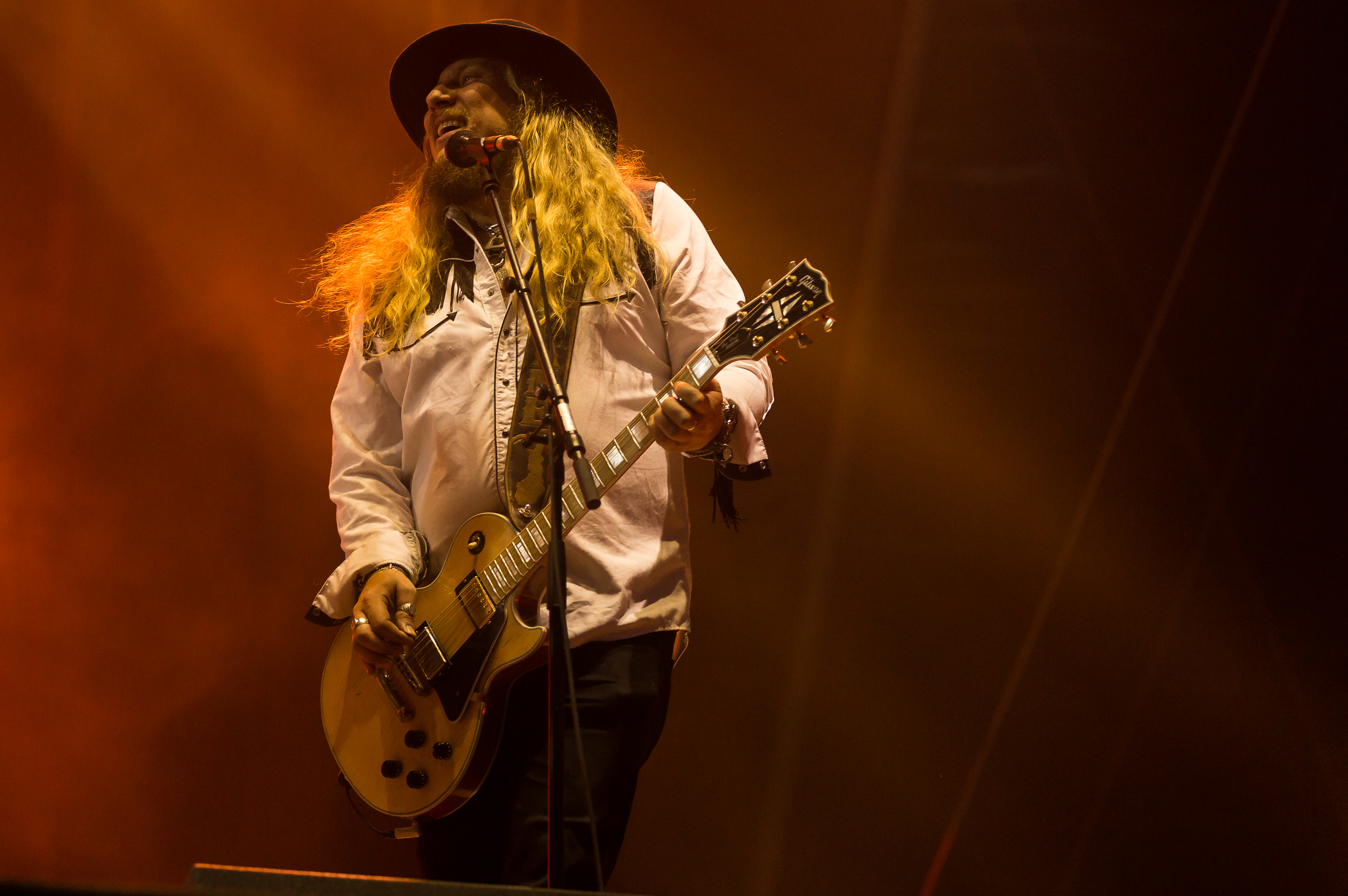
Kalle "Cane" Savijärvi

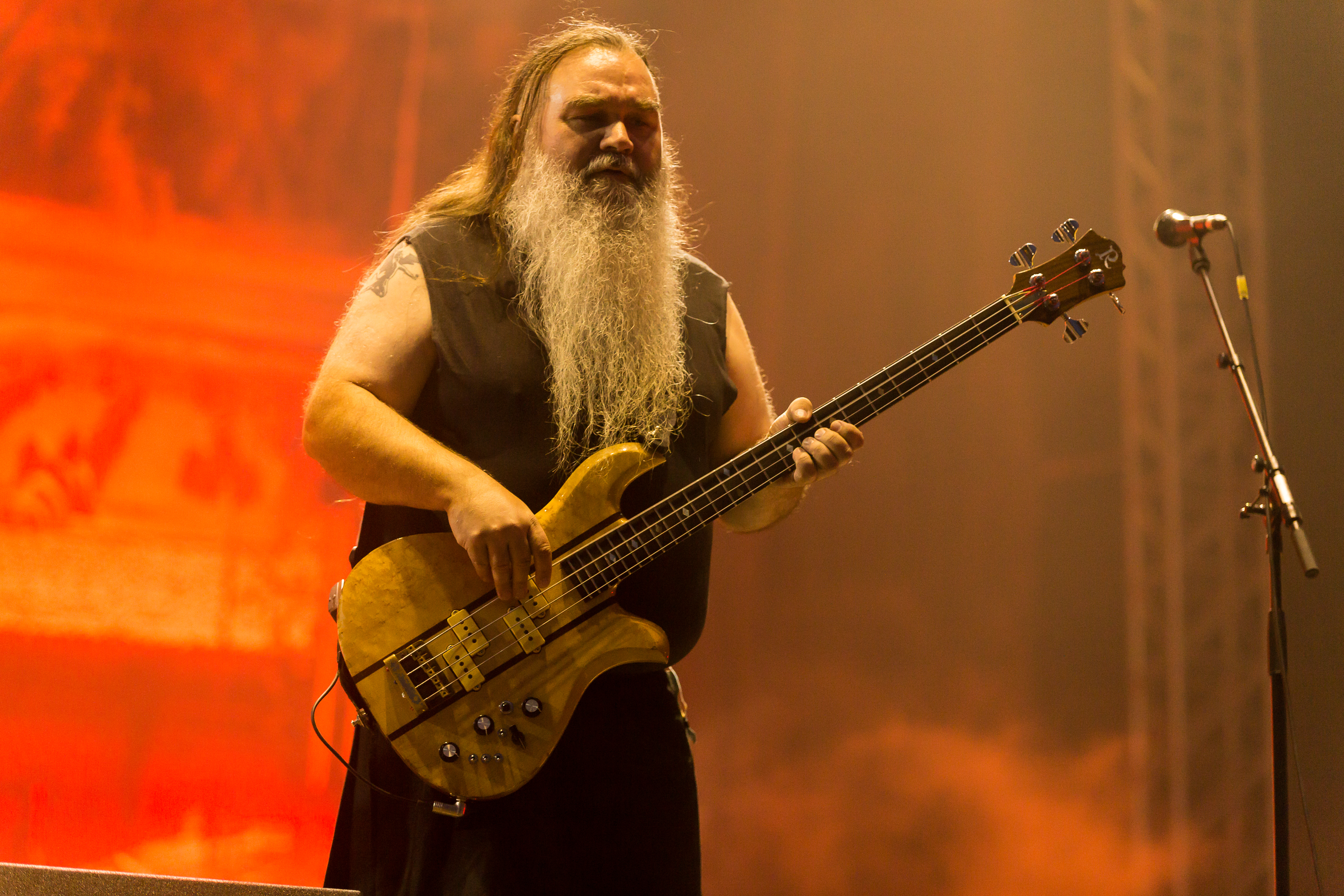
Jarkko Aaltonen

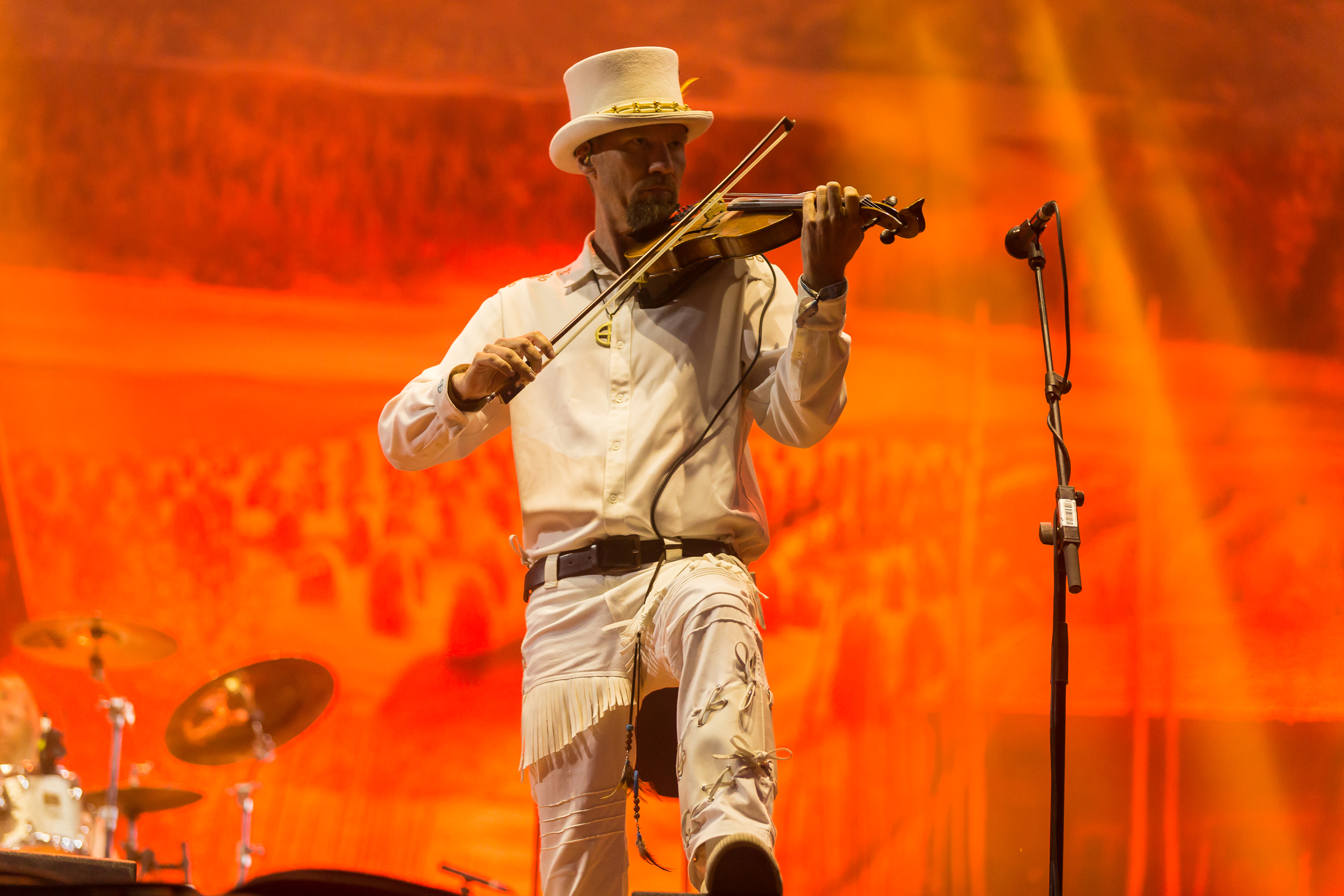
Tuomas Rounakari

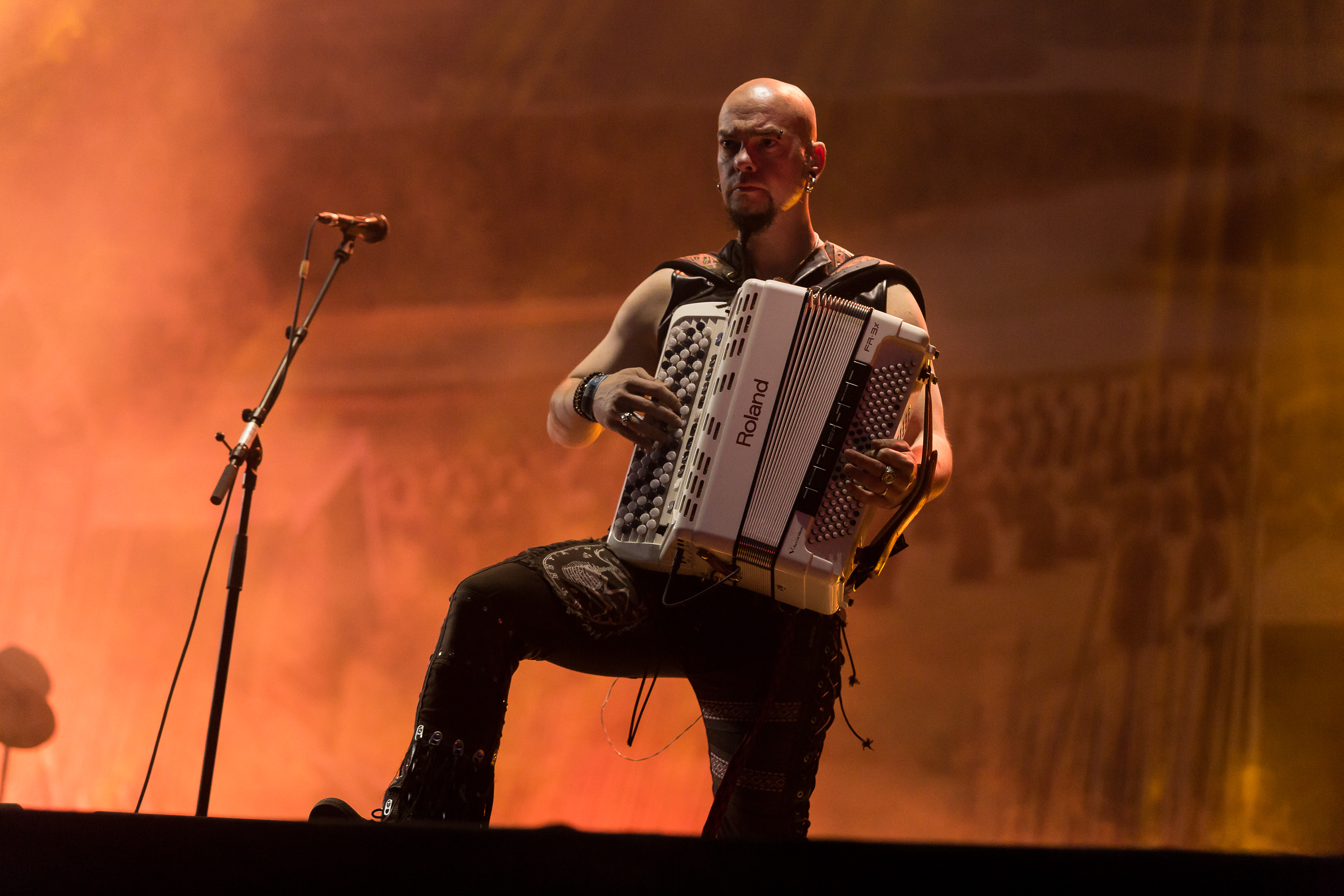
Sami Perttula

Current

- Jonne Järvelä — vocals, luohti, electric and acoustic guitar, lercussion (1993–present)
- Kalle "Cane" Savijärvi — guitar (2003–present)
- Jarkko Aaltonen — bass (2005–present)
- Sami Perttula — accordion (2013–present)
- Samuli Mikkonen — drums (2019–present)
- Olli Vänskä — violin (2022–present)

Former

- Maaren Aikio — vocals, percussion (1993–1997)
- Juke Eräkangas — drums, keyboards, backing vocals (1999)
- Ilkka Kilpeläinen — bass, backing vocals (1999)
- Tero Piirainen — guitar, keyboards, backing vocals (1999)
- Samu Ruotsalainen — drums (2002–2003)
- Janne G`thaur — bass (2002)
- Hosse Latvala — percussion, drums (2002)
- Veera Muhli — keyboards (2002)
- Toni Näykki — guitar (2002)
- Henri "Trollhorn" Sorvali — keyboards (2002)
- Matti "Matson" Johansson — drums (2003–2019)
- Jaakko "Hittavainen" Lemmetty — violin, jouhikko, bagpipes, flute (2003–2011)
- Toni "Honka" Honkanen — guitar (2003–2005)
- Ali Määttä – percussion (2003–2005)
- Arto Tissari — bass (2003–2005)
- Juho Kauppinen — accordion (2004–2013)
- Teemu Eerola — violin (2011)
- Tuomas Rounakari — violin (2012–2022)

== Discography ==
=== Studio albums ===
as Shamaani Duo

- Hunka Lunka (1996)

as Shaman

- Idja (1999)
- Shamániac (2002)

as Korpiklaani

- Spirit of the Forest (2003)
- Voice of Wilderness (2005)
- Tales Along This Road (2006)
- Tervaskanto (2007)
- Korven Kuningas (2008)
- Karkelo (2009)
- Ukon Wacka (2011)
- Manala (2012)
- Noita (2015)
- Kulkija (2018)
- Jylhä (2021)
- Rankarumpu (2024)
