= Karkelo =

Studio album by Korpiklaani
- Released: 26 June 2009
- Recorded: Petrax Studio in Hollola and Grooveland Recording Studio in Lahti, 2009
- Genre: Folk metal
- Length: 51:23
- Languages: English, Finnish
- Label: Nuclear Blast
- Producer: Aksu Hanttu

Korpiklaani chronology
Korven Kuningas (2008)	Karkelo (2009)	Ukon Wacka (2011)

Singles from Karkelo
- 1. "Vodka" Released: 27 May 2009

Professional ratings
Review scores
Source	Rating
AllMusic	3.5/5 stars
Metal Underground	4.5/5 stars

Karkelo is the sixth studio album by Finnish folk metal band Korpiklaani. The title is the Finnish interpretation of the word "party", or otherwise meaning loosely "having fun" or "frolic".

== Pre-release and production ==
The band started recording material on 15 February. The album was released on 26 June 2009. The songs had the drums recorded in Petrax studio located in Hollola with the rest of the instruments recorded in Grooveland Recording Studio based in Lahti. In support of the album's release, Korpiklaani underwent their first North American tour in April and May 2009.

Three versions of a single for the song "Vodka" were released in anticipation of this album in May 2009. The CD version of the single was released in Finland on 27 May 2009, and the digital single, along with the 7" picture vinyl, was released on 29 May 2009. The B-side of the single is "Juodaan Viinaa".

== Track listing ==
All lyrics are written by Juha Jyrkäs, except where noted; all music is composed by Jonne Järvelä, except where noted.

No.	Title	Length
1.	"Vodka" (lyrics by Järvelä)	2:59
2.	"Erämaan ärjyt" ("Men of the Wild")	2:56
3.	"Isku pitkästä ilosta" ("Rising High, Falling Down")	4:10
4.	"Mettänpeiton valtiaalle" ("Hidden by the Spirit of the Forest")	6:41
5.	"Juodaan viinaa" ("Let's Drink Booze" (Hector cover, music and lyrics by Heikki Harma))	3:15
6.	"Uniaika" ("Dreamtime"; music by Jarkko Aaltonen)	4:22
7.	"Kultanainen" ("Gold Woman")	6:16
8.	"Bring Us Pints of Beer" (lyrics by Järvelä)	2:48
9.	"Huppiaan aarre" ("The Treasure of Huppias"; music by Aaltonen)	5:12
10.	"Könnin kuokkamies" ("Könni Ploughman", digipack bonus track (music by Juho Kauppinen))	3:04
11.	"Vesaisen sota" ("Vesainen's War")	3:39
12.	"Sulasilmä" ("Sweet Eyes")	5:37
13.	"Kohmelo" ("Hangover", lyrics by Järvelä)	3:28
Total length:		54:27

== Personnel ==
- Jonne Järvelä - vocals, guitars, percussion, choirs
- Juho Kauppinen - accordion, guitars on "Uniaika", choirs
- Cane - guitars, choirs
- Hittavainen - fiddle, viola, mandolin, tin whistle
- Jarkko Aaltonen - bass
- Matti Johansson - drums, choirs

=== Guest musicians ===
- Aksu Hanttu - backing vocals

=== Production ===
- Svante Forsbäck - mastering
- Jan "Örkki" Yrlund - artwork
- Aksu Hanttu - producer, recording, mixing
- Harri Hinkka - photography
