= Khromka =

Musical instrument

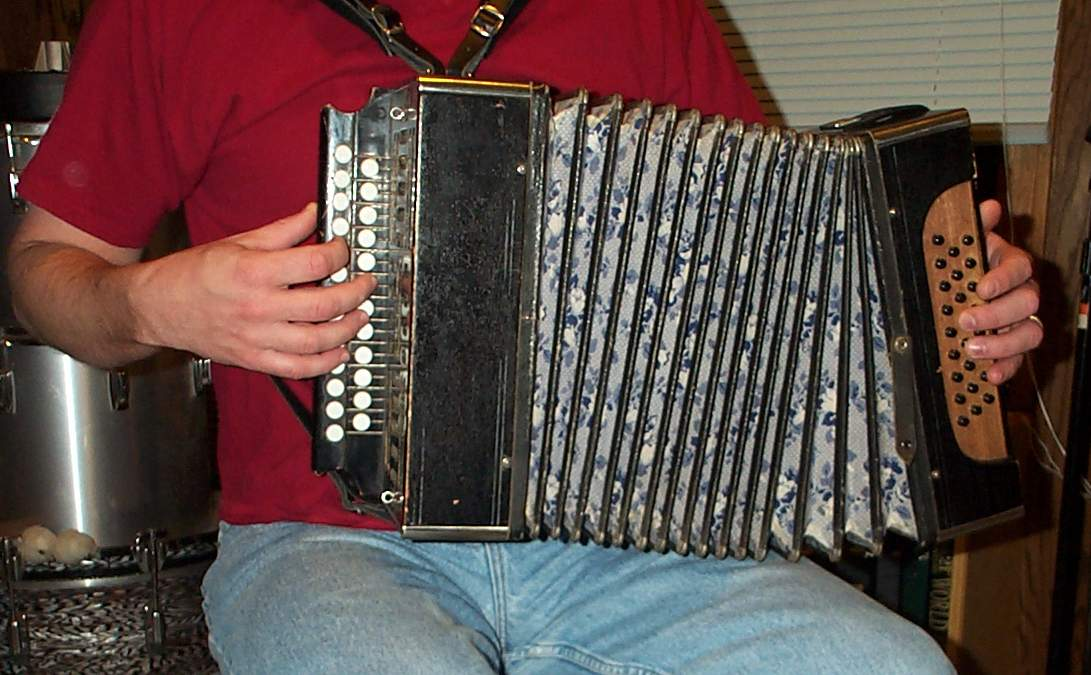
- Classification: Free reed aerophone
- Developed: Late 19th century

Playing range
- C4-C7

Related instruments
- diatonic button accordion, bayan

Khromka (Russian: хро́мка, khromka) is a type of Russian garmon (unisonoric diatonic button accordion). It is the most widespread variant in Russia and in the former USSR. Nearly all Russian garmons made since the mid of the 20th century are khromkas.

== History ==
Since 1830s when first Russian diatonic accordions (named garmonika, garmon or garmoshka after German: Harmonika) began being produced in Tula many regional variations appeared. One of them were one-row accordions from Vyatka (called severyanka from sever "North") and from Livny (called livenka). Their important feature was that it was unisonoric (the same note is produced on pressing and drawing the bellows), while all other European types including Russian ones were bisonoric (two notes are produced on pressing and drawing the bellows). From those types under the probable influence of two-row bisonoric German accordions the first khromkas were made in 1890s. At first they were one of many types and were competing with other traditional variants (of Vyatka, Saratov, Livny, Yelets and many others).

But everything has changed since the October Revolution. The new Soviet government began to follow a policy of "cultural education of masses". Garmon, as one of the most widespread folk instrument, was recognized as the most important and useful medium of this policy. In 1920s the special government commission took several researches and finally decided that all handicraftsmen had to unite into centralized cooperative factories (artels) and must produce only three types of button accordions: khromka, bayan (chromatic button accordion) and the Russian modification of a German bisonoric diatonic accordion (this Russian type also became obsolete by 1950s). The main reasons of the choice of khromka were: unisonoric, simplicity and at the same time great musical potential.

This unification and centralisation allowed mass production of garmons. Only in two factories of Moscow and Leningrad production of garmons grew from 15,000 in 1930 to 100,000 in 1932. 1959 was the record year when nearly half a million khromkas were made in the USSR. But since 1960 their production became falling in the favour of chromatic bayans which then seemed to be preferable than diatonic khromkas.

Since the fall of the USSR and the economic collapse of the country most factories have become bankrupt. Today only two factories still exist in Tula and Shuya, producing just several thousand khromkas a year.

== Constructions ==
In general khromkas are very similar to Western diatonic accordions but in many ways they differ greatly, being more close to bayans.

On the right side there are 25 buttons in two rows. Each button produces only one note either on pressing or drawing the bellows, hence khromkas are unique amongst diatonic accordions. Khromkas can be set with one to five voices (reeds) per note, but usual are of two or three, in total 25, 50, 75, 100 or 125 reeds.

The right keyboard layout in C major

The layout is also unique. The outer row buttons correspond to the notes on the staff line while the inner row buttons - to the note between the lines. The three top buttons, one of the inner row and two of the outer row, are accidentals (G#, D#, F#). In professional models with 27 buttons two additional bottom buttons are C# and A#, & some w/ 29 buttons made by Belarus have 2 more high notes on the top which are High D, & High E. The buttons 3-25 (or 27) are notes of a diatonic scale arranged in a zigzag way (like bayan).

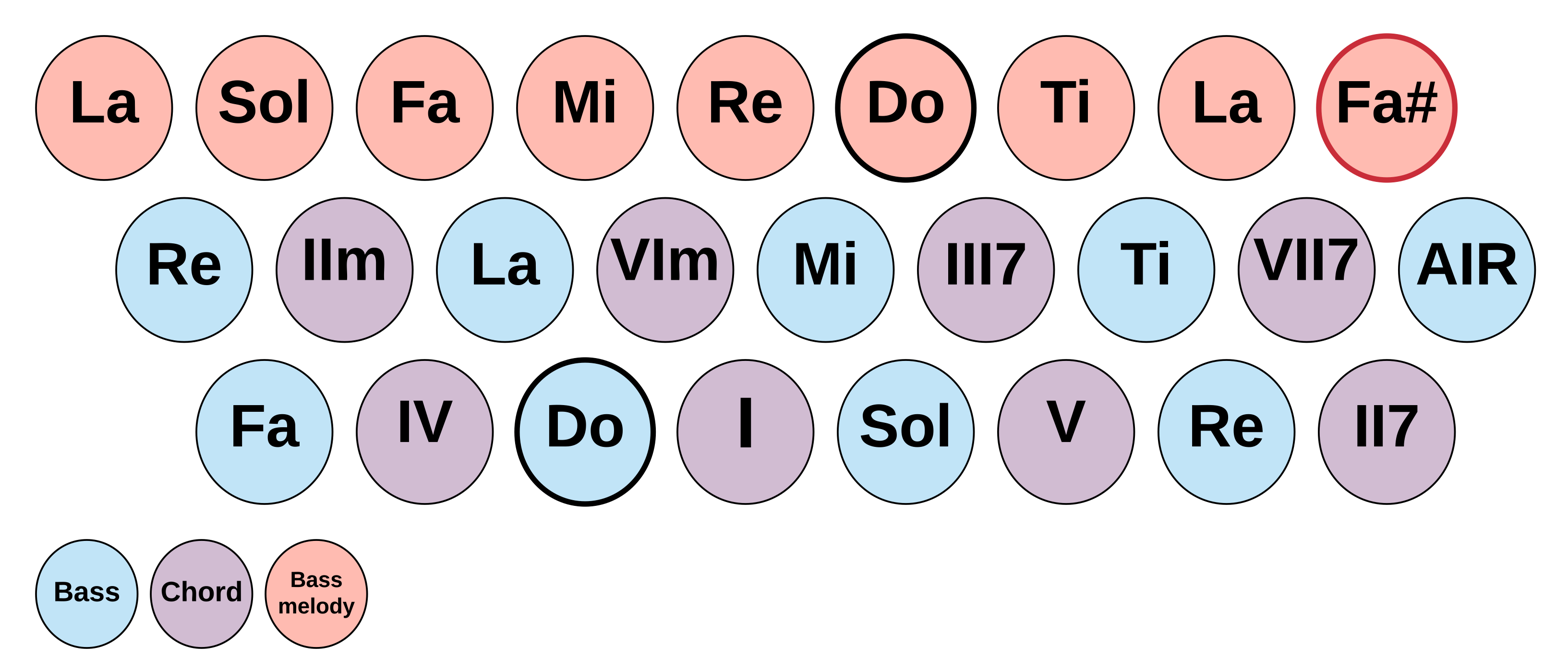
Garmon Left Hand Solfège

The left side differs even more. It has 25 unisonoric buttons in three rows. The outer rows are chords and basses, arranged by turns, while the inner row is bass duplicates. This system is a mix between the unisonoric Stradella system and bisonoric bass systems of Western diatonic accordions.

Some variations exist depending on goals. Expensive professional khromkas can have up to five voices, cassotto, register switches on both the right and left sides and 2 (or even 4) additional treble buttons (like said above),. Cheap, child or souvenir models can have only one or two voices, and reduced number of the buttons (15, 19 or 23 in the right and 12 in the left).

== Tuning ==
Like Western diatonic accordions khromka can be tuned differently. The tuning is identified by the third outer button, which produces the tonic. The default tuning is C major. All scores for khromka are written for garmons in C major. All 12 tunings are possible but most widespread keys are D, G, and A major. All khromkas are played if they were in C Major in spite of their real sound. This makes khromka theoretically a transposing instrument. A musician (garmonist) uses the same fingering for any tuning.

== Sources ==
- Мирек, Альфред. Справочник по гармоням. — М.: Музыка, 1968.
- Мирек, Альфред. И звучит гармоника. — М.: Советский композитор, 1979.
- Имханицкий, М. И. История баянного и аккордеонного искусства. — М.: РАМ им. Гнесиных, 2006.
