= Livenka =

Livenka may refer to:

- Livenka (music), Russian variety of accordion
- Livenka (rural locality), name of several rural localities in Russia
- Livenka (river), a river in Oryol Oblast, Russia
