= Garmon =

Musical instrument

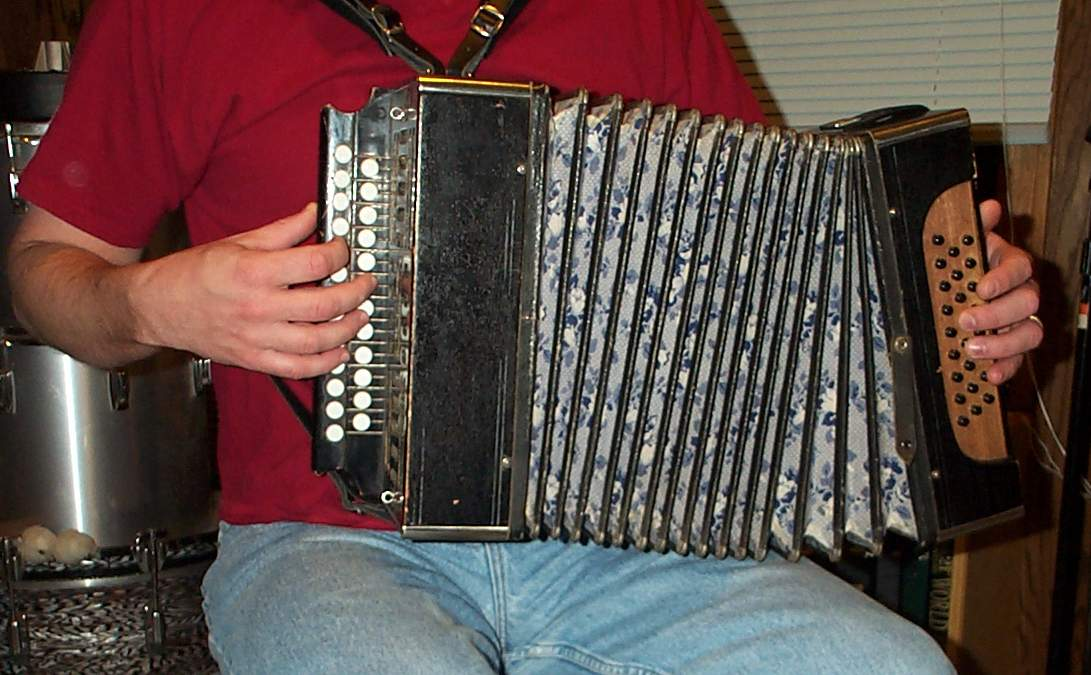

Keyboard instrument
- Classification: Free reed aerophone

Related instruments
- Accordion

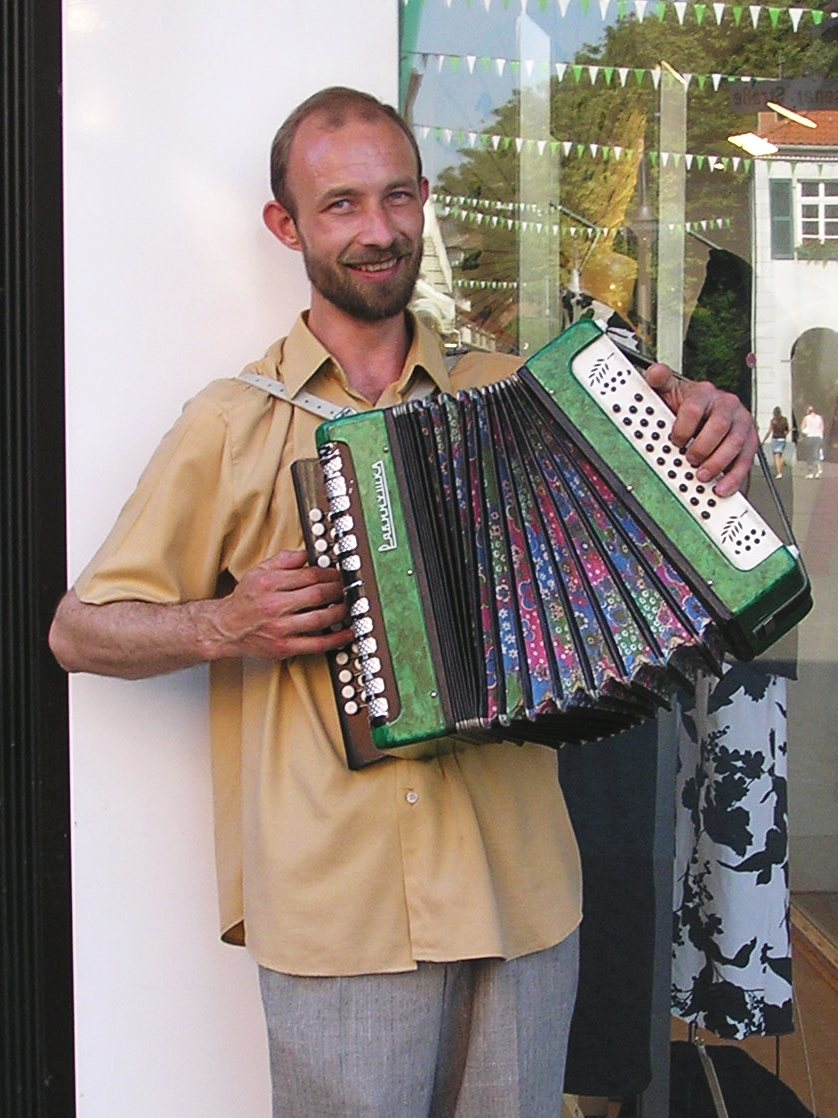
Garmon player

The garmon (Russian: гармо́нь, IPA: [gɐˈrmonʲ], from Russian: гармо́ника, romanized: garmonika, IPA: [gɐˈrmonʲɪkə], cognate of English harmonica), commonly called garmoshka, is a kind of Russian button accordion, a free-reed wind instrument. A garmon has two rows of buttons on the right side, which play the notes of a diatonic scale, and at least two rows of buttons on the left side, which play the primary chords in the key of the instrument as well as its relative harmonic minor key. Many instruments have additional right-hand buttons with useful accidental notes, additional left-hand chords for playing in related keys, and a row of free-bass buttons, to facilitate playing of bass melodies.

The garmons can be of two major classes: unisonoric, meaning that each button plays the same note or chord when the bellows is being expanded as it does when compressed; and bisonoric, in which the note depends on the direction of the bellowswork. Examples of unisonoric type are livenka (ливенка, after Livny, Oryol Oblast), khromka (хромка, 'chromatic'), Tula accordion (Тульская гармонь, after Tula) and talyanka (тальянка, 'Italian')

Beside Russian folk music, the garmon is an important musical instrument for Caucasian (Ossetian, Georgian, Cherkess, etc.) and Mari people in the Volga and Ural regions, and in Slovenian music. It is also used in popular music.

== Keyboard arrangement ==
Although reduced and expanded versions are widely available, the standard arrangement (known as "25 × 25") is as follows:

- 25 treble buttons in two rows: three diatonic octaves plus three accidentals. There are versions with 27 treble buttons adding 2 more accidentals, and versions with 29 treble buttons adding 2 more high notes also exist.
- 25 bass buttons in three rows: two rows of eight buttons, with bass notes and chords; one free-bass row.

=== Right hand ===
The treble keyboard is arranged so that a scale may be played by alternating between the two rows. The low and high octaves have identical fingering, while the middle octave differs. The three accidental notes are arranged so as to mirror the position of the left-hand chords that contain them.

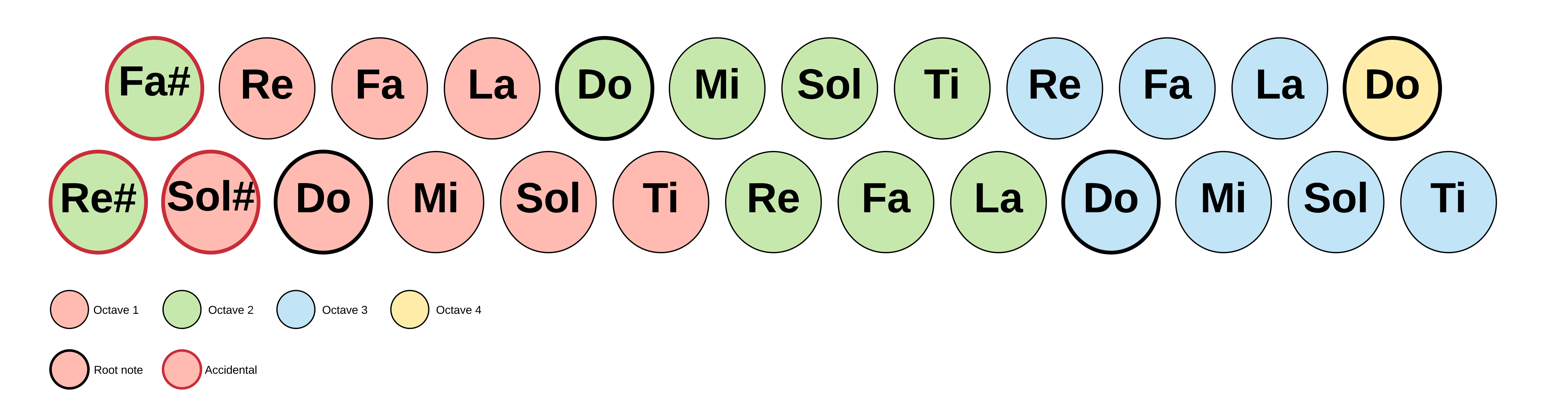
Right hand keyboard layout of the garmon

=== Left hand ===
The bass keyboard is arranged so that the principal chords for the major key are in the outer row, placed in circle of fifths order; the principal chords for the harmonic minor key are in the middle row; free bass notes are in the inner row. One free bass accidental note is included.

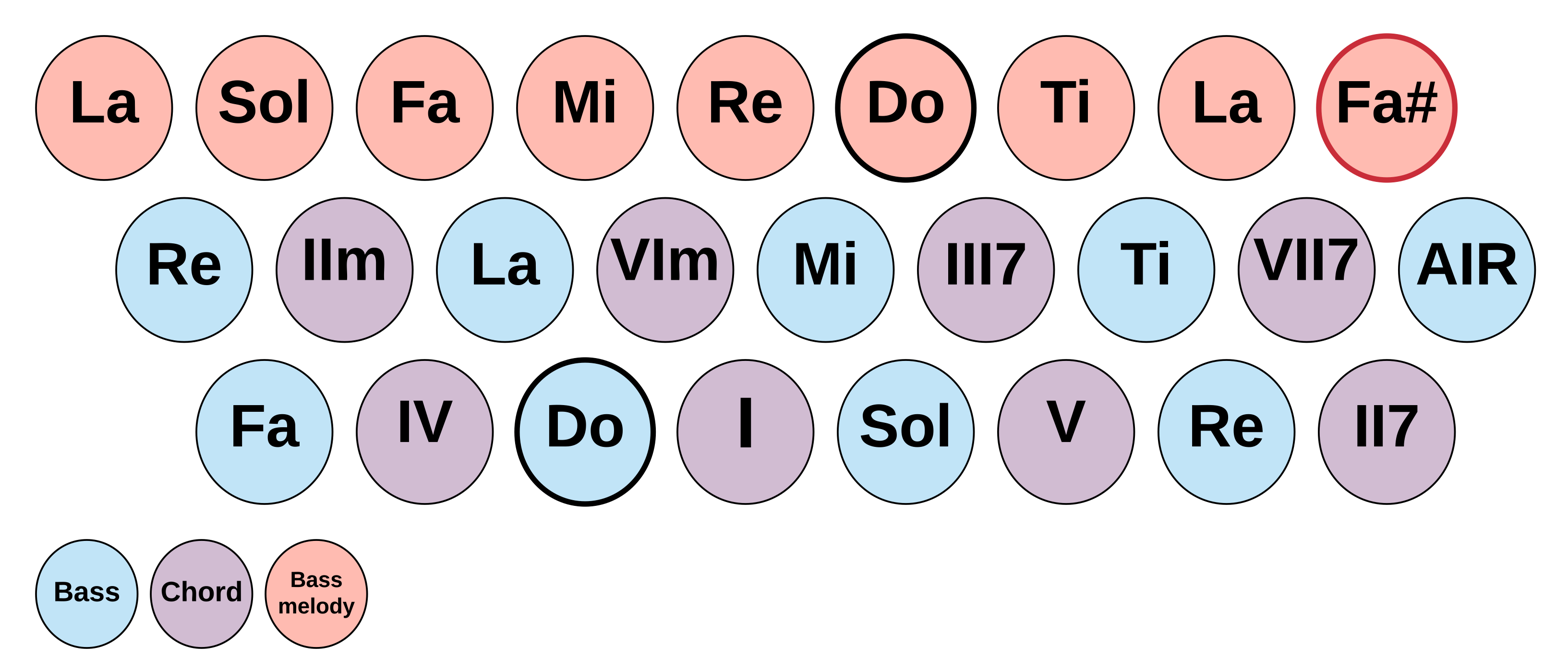
Left hand keyboard layout of the garmon

There are also 36*36 garmon accordions which have a third row of buttons including more accidentals and high notes, as well as more free bass notes.

== Russian types ==
Since the introduction of the accordion from Germany to Russia in the 1830s, Russian masters invented a lot of different types of local garmons during the 19th and 20th centuries.

=== Khromka ===
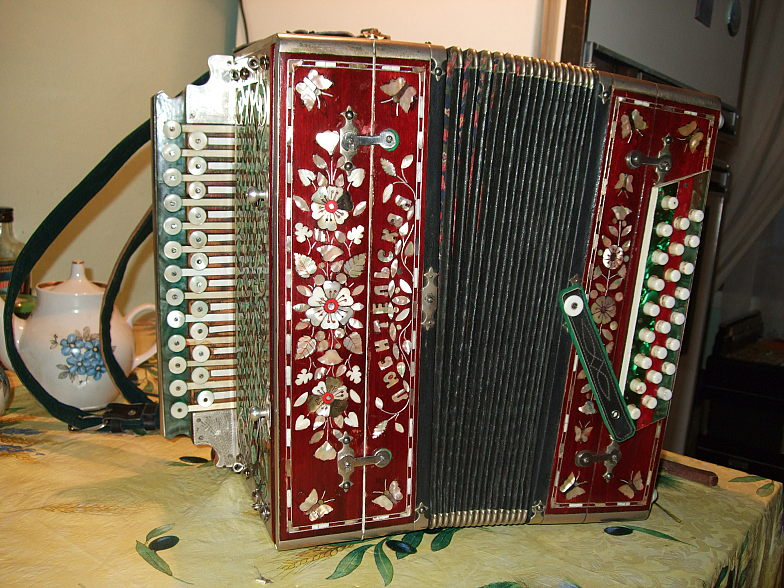
Russian khromka, made in the Tula musical factory in the 20th century.

The khromka (хромка) was invented in 1870 in Tula by Russian musician Nikolay Beloborodov. It was a unisonoric (like the bayan or piano accordion), diatonic accordion but on the right keyboard there were also two or three chromatic buttons, usually g^{1}♯, d^{2}♯, f^{2}♯, hence the name khromka. It became the most popular and widespread button accordion in Russia, so almost all modern Russian (as well as Soviet) garmons (usually made in Tula and Shuya factories) are khromkas.

=== Tula garmon ===
Tula garmon (Russian: тульская гармонь, семиклапанка) was the first Russian accordion, which began to be manufactured since the 1830s. It had five or seven buttons on the right keyboard, and like in the most Western diatonic accordions it produced different sounds on pull and push. So Tula garmon had two full diatonic octaves (from C4 to C6). The left bass keyboard had two buttons. Tula garmon was a base for all the Russian diatonic bisonoric garmoshkas (Saratov, Kasimov etc.)

=== Vyatka garmon ===
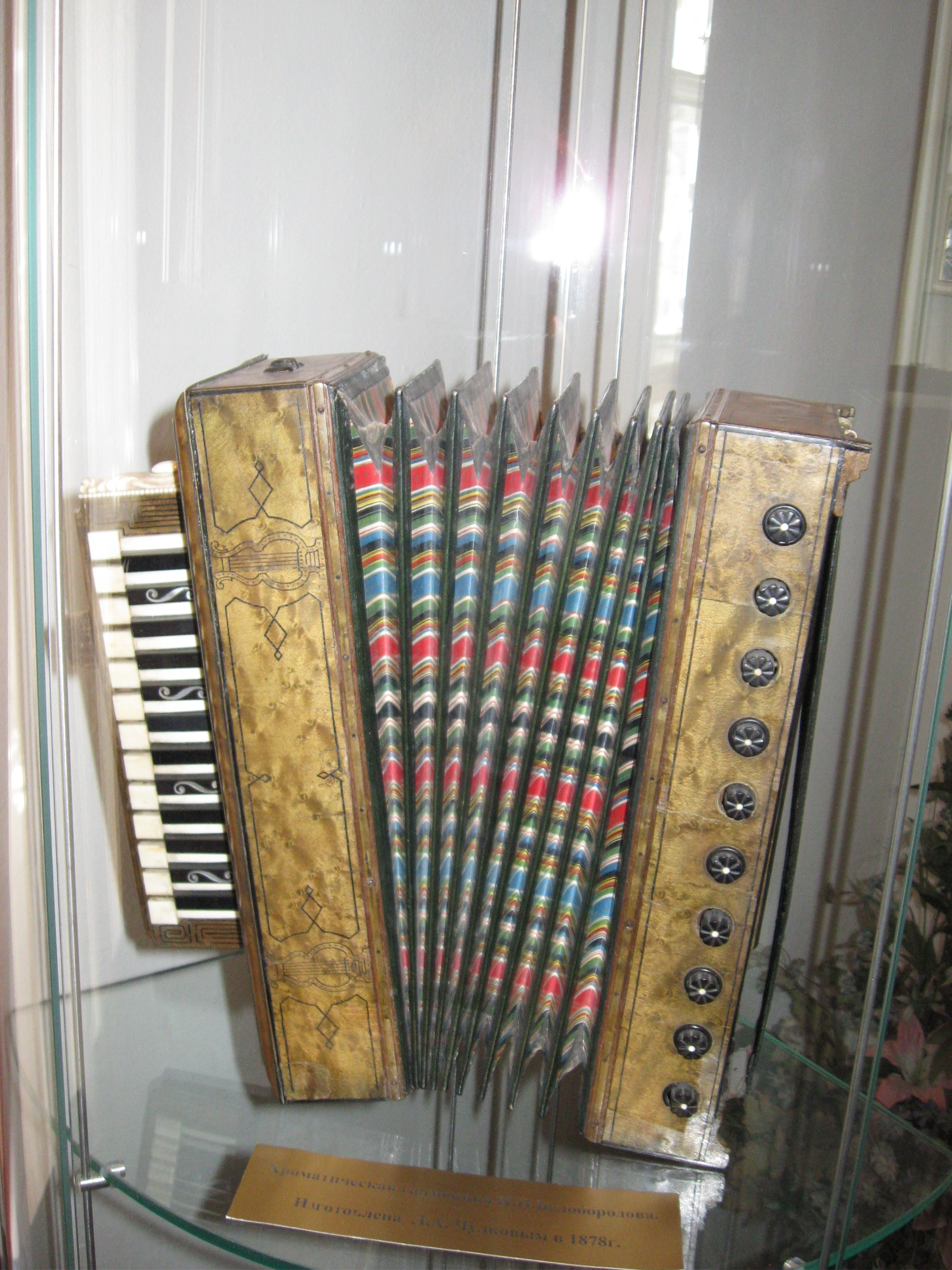
Nikolay Beloborodov's chromatic piano accordion, 1878.

Vyatka garmon (Russian: вятка, вятская гармонь) first appeared on the factories of Vyatka governorate in the middle of the 19th century. It was chromatic unisonoric, it had a piano keyboard on the right side and two bass buttons on the left one. Vyatka garmon was a prototype for many different types of national accordions in the Volga region and the Caucasus (see below). Also after it there were made Russian diatonic and chromatic accordions: Elets "royal" (means with a piano keyboard, because in Russian a grand piano is called "royal") garmon, Beloborodov's royal garmon (made by Tula master Chulkov in the 1870s on the design of Beloborodov, it had a full chromatic right keyboard and resembled modern piano accordions) and others.

=== Saratov garmon ===
The Saratov garmon (Russian: саратовская гармонь) is a diatonic, bisonoric garmoshka with bells which ring when the bass and chord keys are played. Lidia Ruslanova sang to the accompaniment of this garmonika.

=== Livenka ===
The livenka (ливенка) or Livenskaya garmoshka (Ливенская гармошка) was developed in the 1860s and 1870s in the factories around the town of Livny (Oryol Oblast).

== Asian and Caucasian garmons ==
Russian garmons were popular not only among the Russians but also among the other nations of the Russian Empire and the Soviet Union. Almost all the national garmons are based on the Tula, Vyatka and Khromka garmons, with modifications to fit the local national musical traditions. Some were professionally invented in music factories in the 20th century.

=== Volga, Ural and Siberian regions ===
- The Mari accordion (marla-karmon) is a seven-button, diatonic, bisonoric instrument based on the Tula garmon.
- The Mari koga-karmon and Chuvash kubos are based on the khromka.

=== Caucasian ===
The phændur or Ossetian accordion was based on the European accordion. It was designed for the features of Ossetian folk music, and was adopted by other musicians from other Caucasian peoples, becoming popular all over the Caucasus.

=== Oriental accordion ===
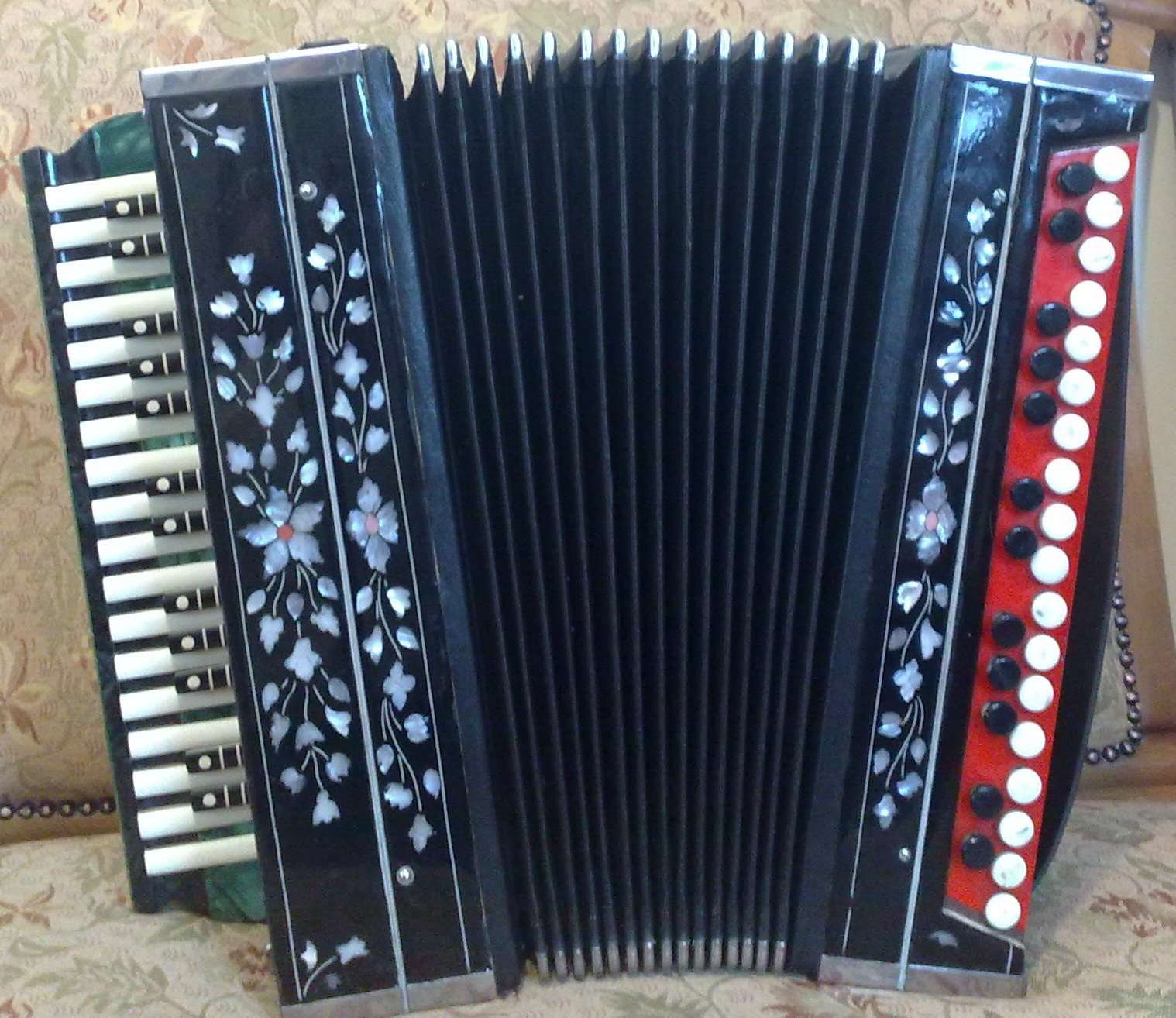
An Oriental bayan produced in the Tula musical factory some 30 years ago.

The oriental bayan (восточная выборная гармоника) was invented in 1936 in the Kazan musical factory, it has a right-hand piano keyboard but a little smaller, so in fact it imitates a piano accordion. In 1961 the Kazan revised it so that the left keyboard mirrored the right, though the left buttons are not rectangular but round, like in button accordions. This type is popular in the music of Azerbaijan, where it is known as the qarmon. It has been popularized in Azerbaijan by Aftandil Israfilov. It has been popularized in Turkey, too, through the recordings of Nejat Özgür.

=== Georgia and Armenia ===
The garmoni came to Georgia and Armenia from Eastern Europe, namely from Russia, in the 1830s, and immediately became popular among folk musicians. It is especially popular in Tusheti, where it is used as an accompanying instrument for vocals, and also as a solo instrument. The garmoni has two miniature variants, the buzika and the tsiko-tsiko.

The buzika is widespread especially among the mountain inhabitants of Georgia, with its own distinct sound. It is considered a women's instrument, and often a bride was presented with a buzik at the time of her engagement. It was widely used for national holidays, festivals, and parties, and is associated mainly with song and dance melodies. It is also sometimes used for performing solo melodies, or in an ensemble with a doli (drum), daira, diplipito, and panduri.

The tsiko-tsiko, came to Georgia and Armenia from Europe in the 1830s, and mainly accompanies dances.

== Slovenia ==
In Slovenia, the harmonika (see Steirische Harmonika) is popular in traditional and modern music. Some artists have achieved popularity in Europe and the United States of America. The Slovenian style of play differs from the Russian. There are over 300 popular ensembles in Slovenia, one ensemble often consisting of several singers and an accordionist.

== See also ==
- Music of Central Asia
- Bandoneon

== Sources ==
- Prokhorov, Vadim (8 January 2002). Russian Folk Songs: Musical Genres and History. Bloomsbury Publishing PLC. ISBN 978-1-4617-0182-8.
