= The Music of Central Asia =

Textbook on Central Asian music

- Author: Theodore Levin
- Language: English
- Genre: Historical anthropology
- Publisher: Indiana University Press
- Publication date: 2015, 2016
- Media type: Print
- Pages: 676
- ISBN: 978-0-253-01751-2

The Music of Central Asia is a textbook on Central Asian folk music. The work was written by 27 authors living in 14 countries. It was edited by American musicologist and ethnographer Theodore Levin, Kazakh musicologist and historian Saida Daukeyeva, and Kyrgyz anthropologist Elmira Kochumkulova. The volume was announced along with a companion website, www.musicofcentralasia.org, which contains about 200 musical works and additional materials.

The book deals with the musical heritage of Central Asian countries, in particular Kazakhstan, Kyrgyzstan, Tajikistan, Turkmenistan and Uzbekistan, the reforms in the music of the peoples living in these countries during the Soviet era, and the lives and works of leading musicians, artists and musicologists. The book also includes a glossary of musical instruments and musical terms of the peoples of Central Asia, many photographs and maps, as well as short biographies of authors and editors.

The handbook was first published in 2015 by the Aga Khan Trust for Culture in Indiana University Press in Bloomington, Indiana, United States. Reprinted 2016. The work is the first textbook on the music of the peoples of Central Asia. The work consists of four major sections ("Music and Culture in Central Asia", "The World of Nomads", "The World of Sedentary Peoples", "Central Asian Music in the Age of Globalization") and 31 chapters.

The book was well received by critics and readers alike. Sunmin Yoon, a professor at the University of Delaware, praised the book: "It is enriched by research written by modern scholars—both Central Asian and foreign. One of the unique features of the book is that the topics covered are written by people who have experienced them both culturally and musically. ... Through a combination of local scholars and artists, as well as foreign researchers who have worked closely with local scholars, this book presents oral traditions and customs that have rarely been explored to date."

== First manuscript ==
In 2012–2013, a 15-week course was organized at the University of Central Asia and the American University of Central Asia in Kyrgyzstan, the Aga Khan Humanities Project at the University of Central Asia in Dushanbe, and the Kurmangazy Kazakh National Conservatory in Almaty. The editor also used the manual to teach a course on Central Asian and Middle Eastern music at Levin Dartmouth College. The first copy of the book was co-produced by the Aga Khan Music Initiative and the University of Central Asia.

== Sections ==
| Section | Chapter | Chapter name | Description | Author |
|---|---|---|---|---|
| Part I. Music and Culture in Central Asia | 1 | Music in Central Asia: An Overview | The first chapter discusses the geographical and cultural boundaries of Central Asia, the differences and similarities between the nomadic and sedentary peoples of the region, Islam and music, performance and social context, Islam and the fine arts, and the role of Central Asian music in the Soviet Union and early 21st century. | Theodore Levin |
| Part I. Music and Culture in Central Asia | 2 | Musical Instruments in Central Asia | The second chapter discusses the musical instruments of the peoples of Central Asia, the classification of instruments, in particular the Hornbostel–Sachs system and their structure, and, finally, the differences between nomadic and past nomadic peoples and settled peoples. | Theodore Levin |
| Part II. The Nomadic World | Prologue | Who Are the Nomads of Central Asia? | The introduction provides a brief overview of the nomadic peoples of Central Asia in the past, their forced settlement during the Soviet era, and their current lifestyles. | Theodore Levin |
