= Mouth harp =

Mouth harp may refer to:

- Harmonica
- Jaw harp or Jew's harp
- Morsing
- Temir komuz
