= Aftandil =

Aftandil is a given name. Notable people with the name include:

- Aftandil Hacıyev (born 1981), Azerbaijani footballer
- Aftandil Israfilov (1941–2023), Azerbaijani garmon player
