= Central Asian and Chinese music =

The music of Central Asia and that of China exerted influence back and forth from the Tang dynasty onwards.

== History ==
The ancient states of Transoxiana such as Sogdiana, Baktria, Choch played an important role in trade between the East and the West along the Silk Road and in cultural and intellectual exchange between those civilizations. Transoxian craftsmen and merchants exported their goods and took with them musicians, dancers and singers. Artifacts found both in China and Uzbekistan provide clear evidence of such cultural “tours”. The figurines made of clay, bronze and other materials depict men and women with musical instruments travelling on camels. Some depict dancers in Central Asian clothes and Far-Eastern spectators enjoying their dance. Such figurines were found along the Silk Road from Central Asia to China.

Musicians from the West, that came from Central Asia of Chinese descent, travelled to China for many reasons. They entertained caravan members during their long journeys. They earned large sums giving concerts in the palaces of the Chinese Emperor and men of high rank. Music and song were used to attract the attention of Chinese customers to merchants' stalls.

According to Chinese scientist Sun Syan, Sogdian songs, dances and music always could be heard in the palaces, in the city and village streets on the Chinese empire. Japanese scientist Kisibe distinguished the names of 31 musicians from the West who worked in the palace of the Tang dynasty. Chinese princesses Yan and Rokshan received dance classes and learned dance techniques from Sogdian dancers. According to Chinese sources, the group of young male and female dancers from Kesh (present day Shahrisabz in Uzbekistan) and Samarkand performed wearing vermilion dress and red leather shoes. Rolling, twirling and twisting the body were unique aspects of their dances which can be seen today both in Far-Eastern and Uzbek female dances.

Chinese poets left written testimonies about Central Asian dancers and singers. Bo Tsyuy-I at the end of 9th century wrote a poem “A singer girl from Choch”, inspired by the voice of a young woman from Tashkent. A poem written by Yuan Chjen titled “Western girls rolling as the wind” was inspired by the unique and exotic ‘Western’ dances.

Recent archeological researches in Sogdiana, Baktria, Choch, Khoresm and Fergana made it clear that they exported their unique music and culture to China, Korea and even Japan.
