= Theodore Levin (ethnomusicologist) =

American ethnomusicologist

Theodore Craig Levin
- Born: 1951 (age 74–75)
- Education: Amherst College (BA); Princeton University (MFA, PhD)
- Known for: Works on the music of the Balkans, the Caucasus, Tuva, and Central Asia
- Scientific career
- Workplaces: Dartmouth College; Silk Road Project; Aga Khan Music Initiative in Central Asia

Theodore Craig Levin (born 1951) is an American ethnomusicologist. He is a professor of music at Dartmouth College in New Hampshire and earned his undergraduate degree at Amherst College and obtained his Ph.D. from Princeton University. Levin has focused his research on the people of the Balkans, Siberia, and Central Asia. His recordings from these regions have been released on various labels.

Levin served as the first executive director of the Silk Road Project, an initiative of the American cellist Yo-Yo Ma. He also served as chair of the Arts and Culture sub-board of the Open Society Foundations. Currently he is a senior project consultant to the Aga Khan Music Initiative in Central Asia of the Aga Khan Trust for Culture.

Levin began studying Central Asian forms of music in 1974. Since then, he has written several books, including The Hundred Thousand Fools of God: Musical Travels in Central Asia (and Queens, New York) (first published in 1996). He chronicled his journey to Tuva in his book Where Rivers and Mountains Sing: Sound, Music, and Nomadism in Tuva and Beyond (first published in 2006).

== Books ==
Levin's first book, The Hundred Thousand Fools of God: Musical Travels in Central Asia (and Queens, New York), was published by Indiana University Press in 1996. It was republished in 1999. In it, Levin chronicles his travels across Central Asia from 1977 to 1994. Levin records information about various musical genres and traditions, such as shashmaqam, suvara, and dastan as well as a variety of folk genres. The book provides a detailed account of Central Asian folk customs in Tsarist, Soviet and post-Soviet periods. The volume was published with an accompanying 24-track CD with location recordings.

Levin's second book, Where Rivers and Mountains Sing: Sound, Music, and Nomadism in Tuva and Beyond, was first published by Indiana University Press in 2006. It was republished in 2010. In this volume, Levin chronicles his experiences with a Tuvan throat-singing group. The author details the Tuvan people's ideas about nature and animals, and how their music reproduces the sounds and actions of those animals. The idea of tradition is also brought up frequently, especially in the case of the throat singers. A Russian edition of the book with contributions from Valentina Süzükei was published by Klassika-XXI in 2012 under the title Музыка новых номадов. Горловое пение в Туве и за ее пределами (literally "The Music of the New Nomads. Throat singing in Tuva and Beyond"). Both the English and Russian versions were published with an accompanying CD.

Levin also edited the book The Music of Central Asia along with Saida Daukeyeva and Elmira Köchümkulova. The book was published in 2016 by Indiana University Press with the support and collaboration of the Aga Khan Music Initiative, a program of the Aga Khan Trust for Culture. The volume contains contributions by 27 authors from 14 countries, and has a companion website (www.musicofcentralasia.org) with access to close to 200 audio and video examples. It was also published as an e-book in two volumes. The project received the 2017 Public Outreach Award of the Central Eurasian Studies Society as well as the 2018 RUSA Dartmouth Medal for Excellence in Reference.

In 2025, Levin published Musical Argonauts of Central Asia: The Aga Khan Music Programme's Quest to Revitalize Cultural Heritage, as part of the 'Activist Encounters in Folklore and Ethnomusicology' series (ed. David A. McDonald) of Indiana University Press. This book discusses Levin's work to support cultural development programming Central Asia, particularly through the Aga Khan Music Programme.

== Recordings ==
Levin's recordings from the Balkans, the Caucasus, Siberia, and Central Asia have been released on various labels, including Nonesuch Records, Smithsonian Folkways, Ocora, and Auvidis. In particular, Levin produced the 1990 CD Tuva: Voices from the Center of Asia, which is the first commercial recording of Tuvan music released in the West. Additionally, Levin and the French ethnomusicologist Jean During produced the two-CD set The Silk Road: A Musical Caravan, which was released in 2001. Both of these albums were released on the Smithsonian Folkways label.

Most notably, Levin produced the ten-disk series Music of Central Asia. The project was implemented in collaboration with the Aga Khan Music Initiative in Central Asia, a program of the Aga Khan Trust for Culture, and released on the Smithsonian Folkways label from 2004 to 2011. The second volume of the series was nominated for the 2007 Grammy Award for Best Traditional World Music Album.
