= Israfilov =

Israfilov is a surname. Notable people with the surname include:

- Aftandil Israfilov (1941–2023), Azerbaijani garmon player
- Galib Israfilov (born 1975), Azerbaijani diplomat
- Israfil Israfilov (1892, or 1893–1946), Russian military officer
- Vali Israfilov (born 2002), Azerbaijani swimmer
