= Adamov's mill =

Adamov's Mill
- Адамовская мельница
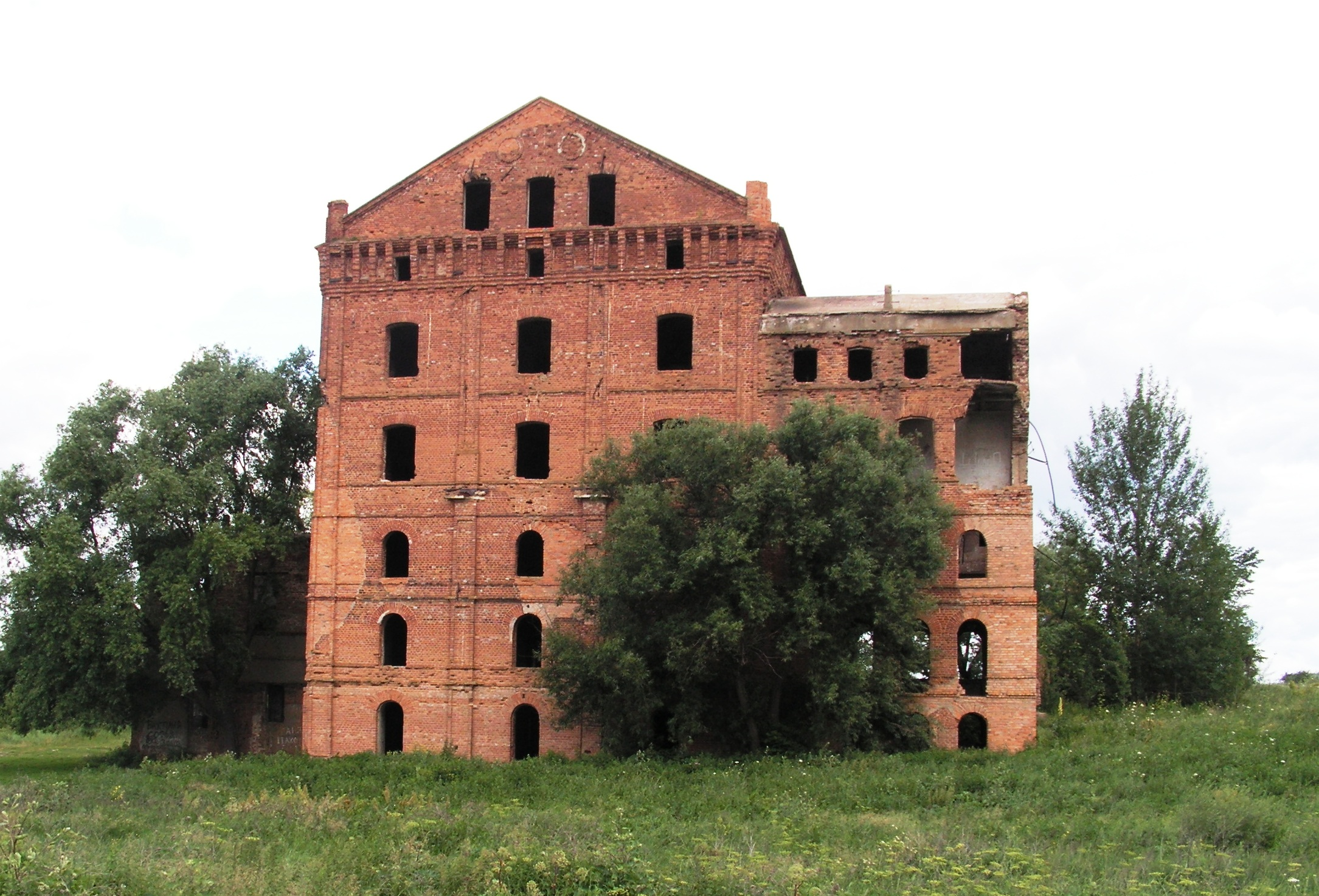
- Adamov's Mill

- Location within Russia

General information
- Status: Derelict
- Location: Livny, Russia
- Coordinates: 52°23′44″N 37°39′11″E
- Construction started: 1870
- Completed: 1873
- Cost: 5 million rubles

Height
- Height: 26 metres (85 ft)

Design and construction
- Architect: Michael Fedorivich Adamov

Adamov's mill (Russian: Адамовская мельница) is a derelict flour mill located outside of Livny, Russia. At its peak in the early 20th century, the mill employed 85 workers and was the fifth largest flour mill in the Russian Empire. It now serves as a tourist attraction for visitors to Livny.

== History ==
The mill was built in 1873 on the Bystraya Sosna River, a few kilometers outside the town of Livny. The mill was built by flour merchant Fedor Adamov, and designed by his son Michael, an architecture student at the Petrovsky Agricultural University.

The mill relied on a water turbine to generate electricity. The initial design was a failure: on the mill's opening day, the turbine would not turn. Fedor Adamov, who had invested 5 million rubles in the project, was devastated by this failure and committed suicide that same day.

The mill was subsequently redesigned and restarted. A dam was installed to raise the water level of the Sosna River, causing the mill village, which was rented by a merchant named Leonov, to be flooded. Leonov sued Michael Adamov (Fedor's son and heir) in court. The court found in Leonov's favor, ruling that Adamov knew his design could cause flooding, and awarded Leonov a large settlement, but this was overturned in the Moscow Court of Justice.

By 1913, the mill employed 85 workers and produced over 9,000 tons of flour a year. Michael Adamov had taken over as master of the mill, and had become one of the wealthiest industrialists in pre-revolutionary Russia. He was known for his generosity to his workers, gifting them with 25 rubles for the birth of a child and giving holiday gifts from his many shops.

The mill was profitable, ranked as fifth in volume of production of flour in the Russian Empire. It was equipped with efficient imported equipment for grinding and transporting flour. The mill's output was mostly exported.

Adamov engaged in charitable activities, donating money for the a church and an outpatient clinic in Livny, a school in Uspenska, and a church in Kozminki.

Following the Russian Revolution, Adamov's mill and its properties were appropriated by the state and given over to the local government. Adamov left for Yalta. An attempt was made to demolish the mill, but owing to a miscalculation involving the required dynamite, the demolition failed, leaving the facility damaged but standing.

During the Soviet era, the mill was fitted with generators for electrical power generation, and served at times as an experimental hydroelectric station. During the 1960s and 1970s, plans were made to refit the plant as a flour mill, but these never materialized.

== Myths and legends ==
The suicide of Fedor Adamov at the mill has sparked local legends that Adamov's ghost haunts the mill, and appears to the unwary, promising to show them a hidden treasure. The legend holds that such unwary visitors are never seen again. There are many blogs about ghostly encounters at the mill.

== Current condition ==
Adamov's mill has stood 140 years on the banks of the Sosna River, bearing the constant barrage of weather, and has been largely unmaintained for the past four decades, leaving it in a state of disrepair that makes it hazardous for present day visitors.
