= Komuz =

Central Asian stringed musical instrument

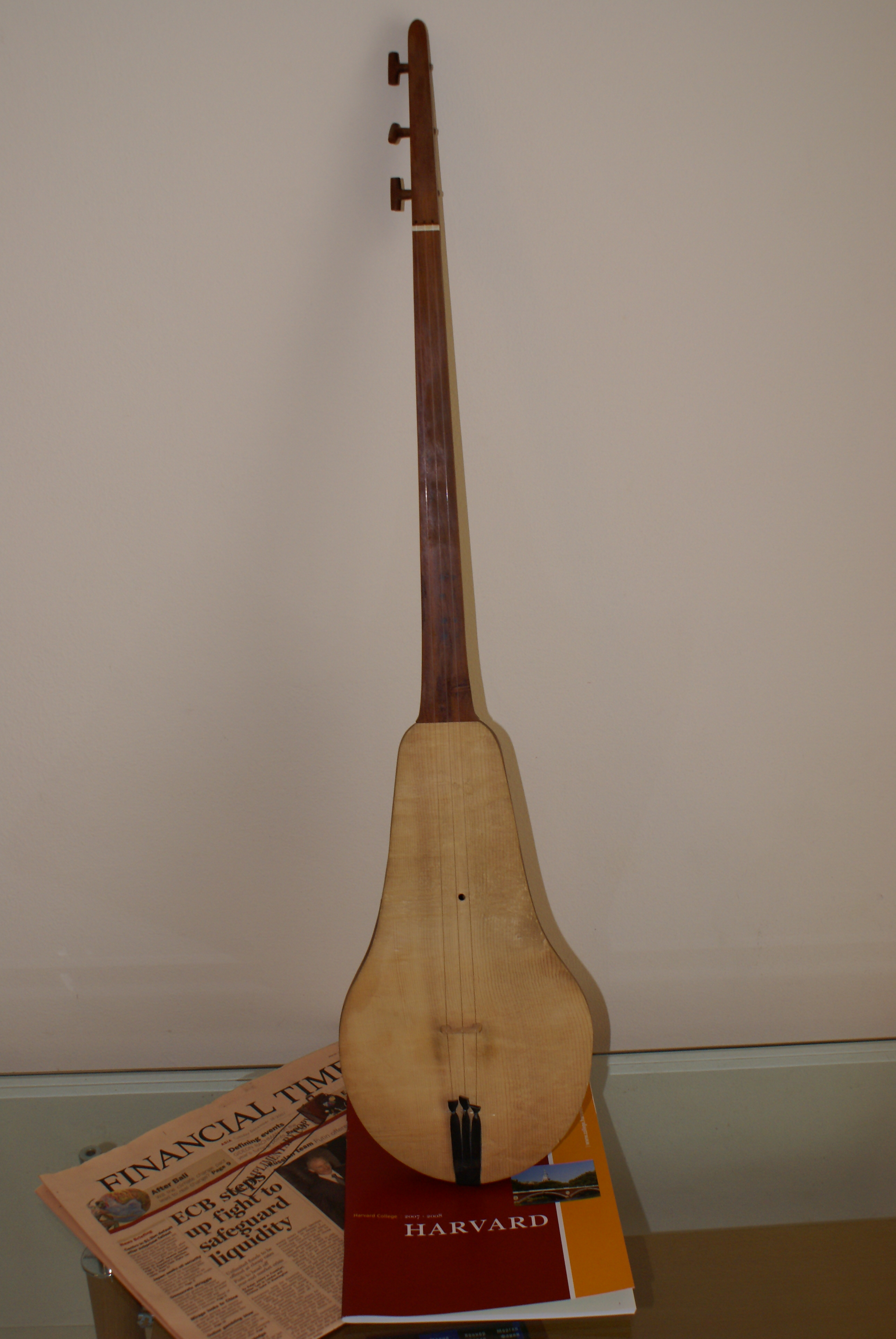
- A Kyrgyz komuz

String instrument
- Other names: qomus; gopuz (Azerbaijan); huobusi 火不思 (China); hebisi 和必斯 (China); hunbusi 渾不似 (China); kopuz (Turkey); sugudu 苏古笃 (Naxi people, China)
- Classification: String

Related instruments
- Other Turkic string instruments, lute, qanbus, modern huobusi

The komuz or qomuz (Kyrgyz: комуз / كومۇز, Kyrgyz pronunciation: [qoˈmuz], Turkish: Kopuz, Azerbaijani: Qopuz) is an ancient fretless string instrument used in Central Asian music, related to certain other Turkic string instruments, the Mongolian tovshuur, and the lute.

The instrument can be found in Turkic ethnic groups, from China to Turkey. Forms of this instrument are used in China by the Naxi people and are called Huobusi, Hebisi, and Hunbusi.

It is the best-known national instrument and one of the better-known Kyrgyz national symbols. The komuz is generally made from a single piece of wood (usually apricot or juniper) and has three strings traditionally made out of gut, and often from fishing line in modern times.

In the most common tunings the middle string is the highest in pitch.

Virtuosos frequently play the komuz in a variety of different positions: over the shoulder, between the knees and upside down.

An illustration of a komuz is featured on the reverse of the one-som note.

== Playing style ==
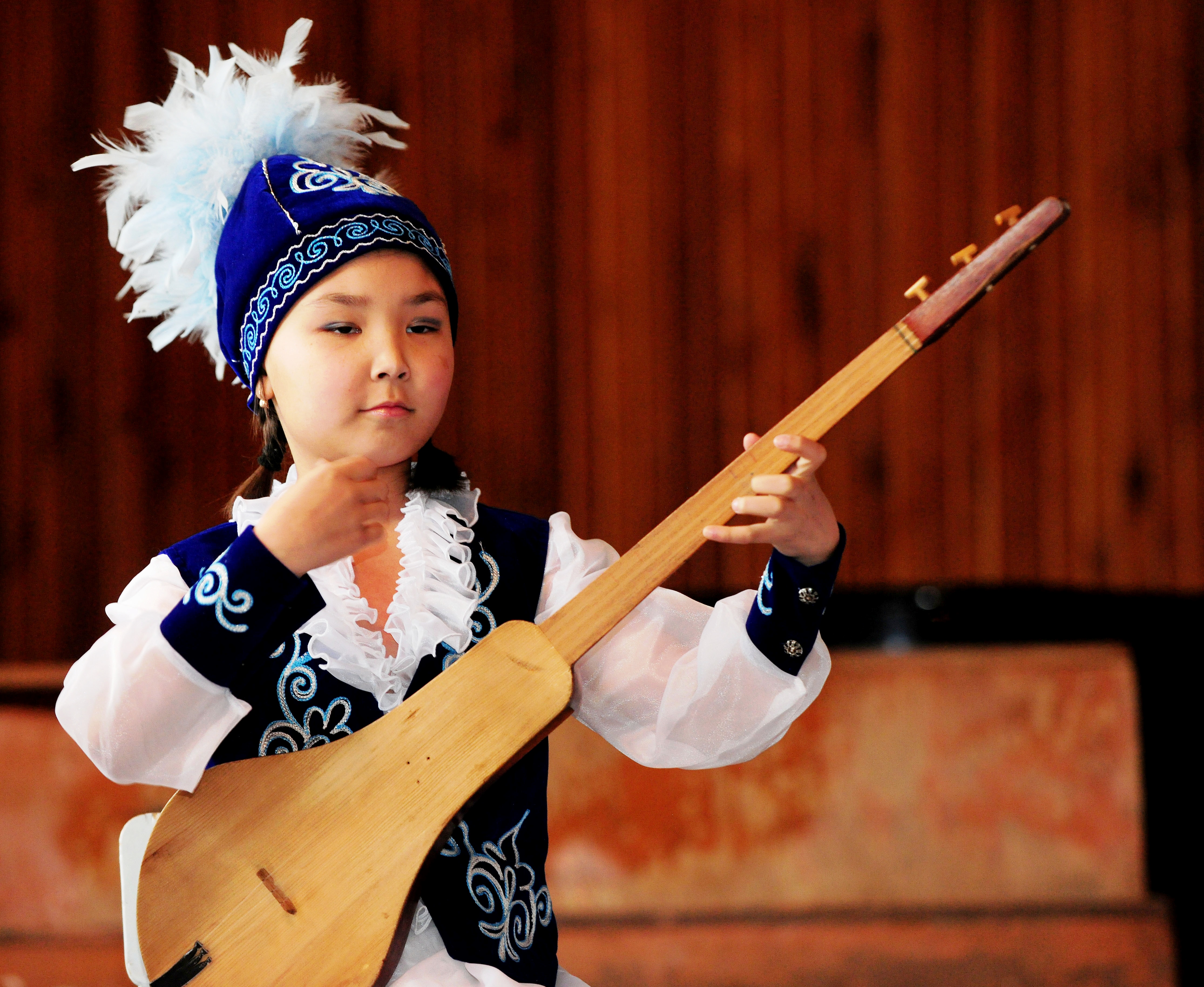
A girl playing the Komuz.

The komuz can be used either as accompaniment or as a lead instrument and is used in a wide variety of musical styles including aytysh (a song competition between akyns) and the recitation of epics. It is generally played seated, held horizontally and may be strummed or plucked.

One piece ("mash botoy") consists of a simple tune repeated many times, each with a new stroke, as a test of the performer’s skill and creativity.

=== Musical tuning ===
The komuz has many different tunings. The names of the tunings correspond with various styles of music:

Kambarkan	d-a-d
Kerbez	e-a-e
Shingrama	d-a-e
Ongu	e-a-b
Ters	d-a-g
(unknown)	d-d'-a

== Etymology ==
The word komuz is cognate to the names of other instruments in the Music of Central Asia, including the Kazakh kobyz (Uzbek qo'biz) (bowed instruments), and the Tuvan and Sakha or Yakut xomus (a jaw harp).

It's should be noted that the Kyrgyz: ооз комуз ([oːz qoˈmuz], literally "mouth komuz") or, alternatively, Kyrgyz: темир комуз ([temir qoˈmuz], literally "metal komuz" or "iron komuz"), is a jaw harp and as an instrument is unrelated to the komuz.

== History ==
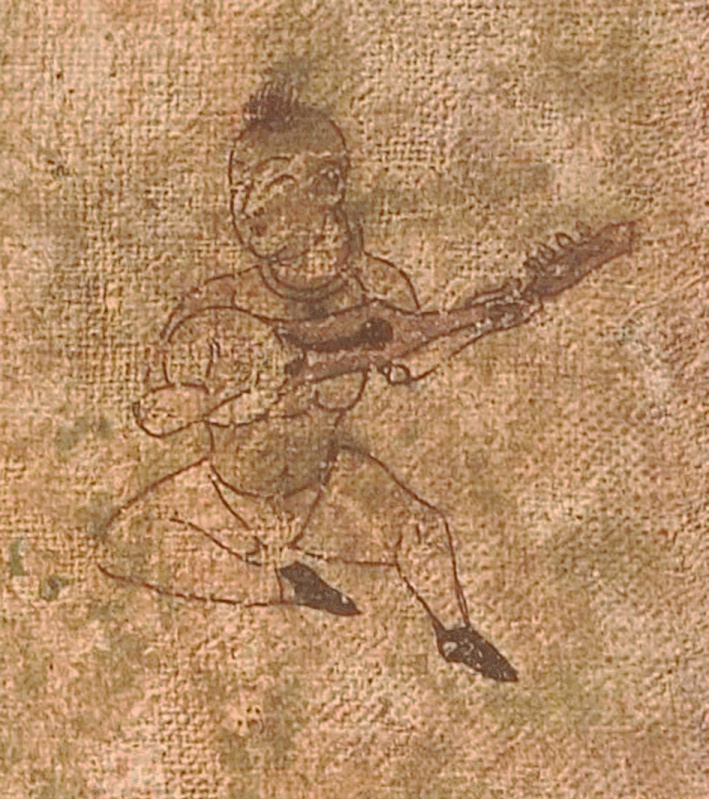
9th century painting on a banner, found in excavations of a Buddhist temple at Yar-khoto. Researchers have tentatively identified it as being part of the komuz family, noting its close resemblance to the modern sugudu (苏古篤), with four strings, also known as hubo (胡撥). These names possibly connect linguistically to the shidurghū lute of the Khatā’ī people of the Mongolian steppes and huobosi ( 火撥思) Hubosi is the Chinese version of the qopuz..

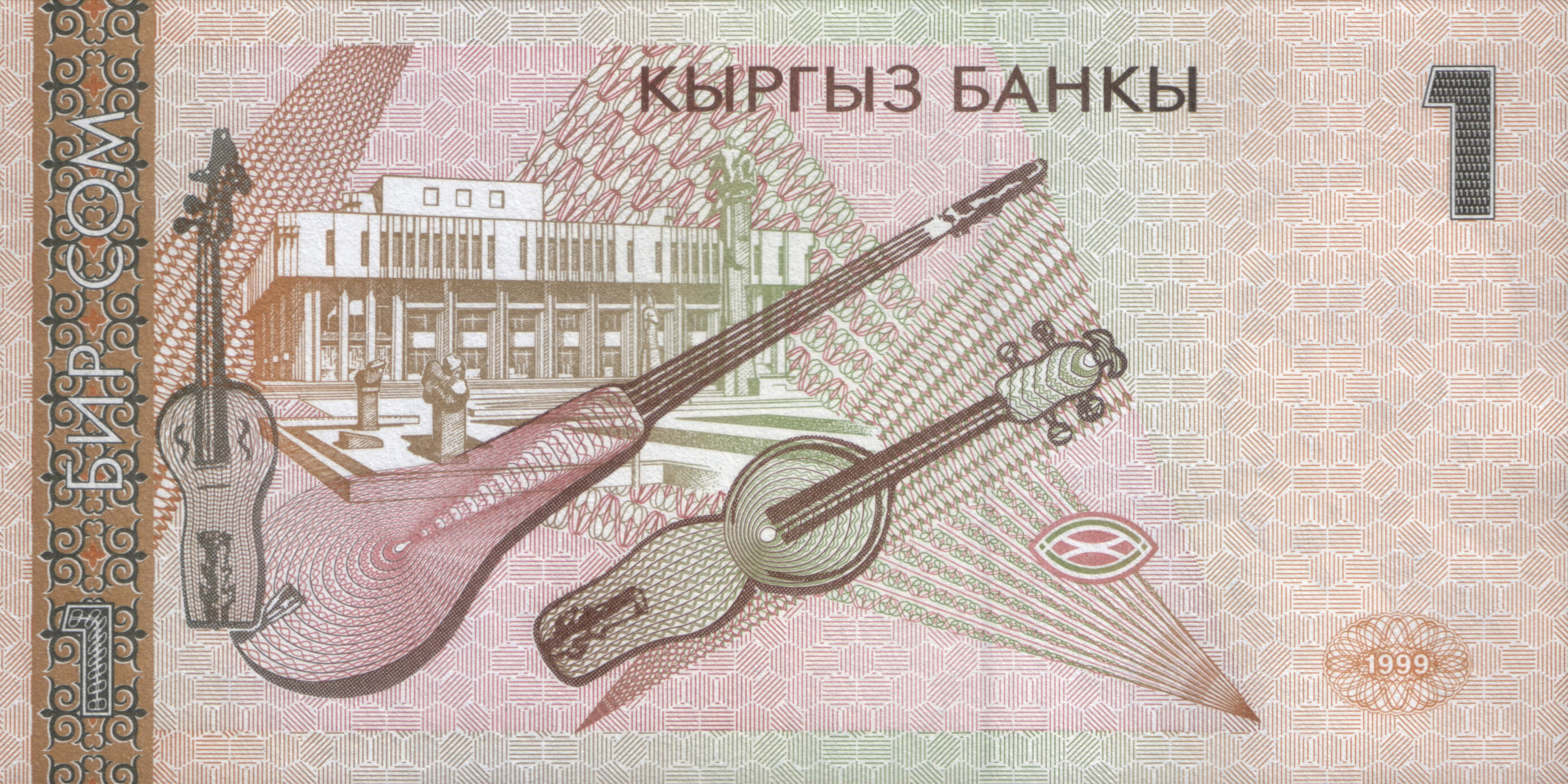
Kyrgyzstan 1-som note featuring the komuz.

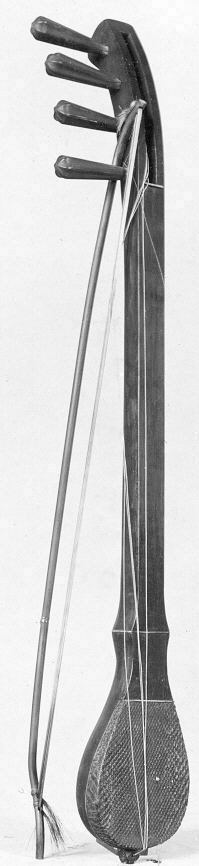
A historical 19th century huobosi, this variant bowed.

The oldest known komuz-like instrument dates from the 4th century although the related Azerbaijani gopuz is believed to date back to 6000 BC following an archaeological discovery of clay plates depicting gopuz players. In the 1960s American archeologists working in the Shushdagh mountains near the ancient city of Jygamish in Iranian Azerbaijan, uncovered a number of rare clay plates which dated back to around 6000 B.C. which depicted musicians at a council, holding a komuz-like instrument to their chests.

The names of parts of the komuz are often allusions to body parts, particularly of horses. For example, the neck is called [mojun] "neck", the tuning pegs are called [qulɑq], or "ear"s. The Kyrgyz word кыл/qyl means "string of an instrument" or "horse's hair".

Like another lutes, the ancient komuz generally had two or three strings.

The two-stringed gil gopuz or "iklyg" was used on the Altai plains, in parts of Turkmenistan and in Chinese territory inhabited by the Uyghur people.

The three-stringed golcha gopuz was more popular in ancient Azerbaijan and Anatolia. it was mentioned in the epic Book of Dede Korkut.

It is made from a leather covering which covered around two-thirds of the surface, and the other third is covered with thin wood along with the sound board. The total length of the instrument is 810 mm, with the body 410 mm, the width 240 mm and the height or breadth only 20 mm.

During the Soviet era the instrument fell from favour. It was derided as rudimentary and attempts were made to make it more like the Russian balalaika, notably by adding frets. After independence, the komuz was again taught in music colleges, though some of the Soviet changes have remained.

In the twentieth century the late Iranian dutar player Haj Ghorban Soleimani invented a new form of the komuz which has received some popularity.

=== Legendary origin ===
In legends, Dede Korkut is seen as the inventor of the kopuz. In The Book of Dede Korkut, his special bond with the kopuz is not limited to his performances as a bard. Of particular importance, there is a passage in the story about the brothers Egrek and Segrek. When Segrek wants to attack Egrek, because he thinks he is dealing with an infidel, he says:

Hey infidel, out of respect for Dede Korkut's lute, I didn't strike. If you didn't have the lute in your hand I'd have you cut in two in my brother's name.

— Segrek to Egrek

Thus a random lute is directly connected to Dede Korkut here, which is presumably a reference to the fact that he was the inventor there.

== Related instruments ==
Different variations of the komuz spread to several eastern European countries such as Ukraine and Hungary during the 4th-5th century A.D, during the mass migration of the Huns into the region. There they became known with similar variations of the name (see: kobza).

In Dagestan (a Russian republic between Chechnya and the Caspian Sea, just east of Georgia in the Caucasus) a special instrument mentioned in both the Vertkov's Atlas SSSR, and in Buchner's book, is called agach komus, or temur by the Avar people. It seems a kind of slender guitar with 3 strings, with a body (carved from one block of wood) shaped like a spade and fitted with a trident-like spike at the lower end.

The Qanbūs of the Arabian and Malay peninsulae is considered by Sachs to derive its name from the komuz. The five-string kopuz is also thought to have transformed into the six-string instrument known as the sestar or seshane by 13th-century mystic Rumi. The word "sestar" is mentioned in the poems of the 14th-century poet Yunus Emre. Evliya Çelebi describes the kopuz as a smaller version of the seshane.

=== Modern huobosi ===
Although the term huobosi still applies to the traditional instrument, in China a newer instrument has evolved from the older instrument, resembling a guitar and called the Huobosi.

== Media ==
- Video of a komuz master
- Video of a komuz player
- A home performance of a traditional Kyrgyz song, played on the komuz
- Salamat Sadyqova performing Alymqan on the komuz

== See also ==
- Music of Central Asia
- Bağlama
- Saz
- Lute
- Dutar
- Dombra
- Pandura
- Gadulka
- Gusle
- Rebab
- Kamancheh
- Cretan lira
- Kobyz
- Temir komuz
- Agiz komuzu
- Gubuz
