= Huobosi =

Stringed musical instrument from China

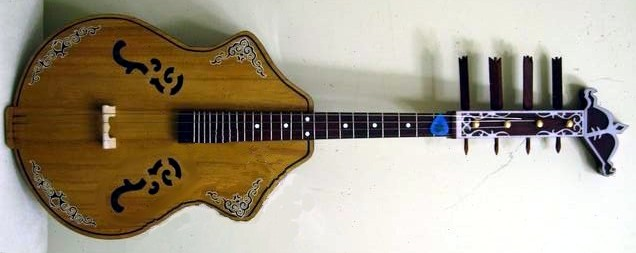
- A modern huobosi

String instrument
- Classification: String instrument
- Hornbostel–Sachs classification: (Composite chordophone)
- Developed: China

Related instruments
- komuz

The Huobosi (simplified: 火不思; pinyin: Huǒbùsī; ) is a stringed musical instrument from China. The name is a transliteration into Chinese of a medieval Turkic name for the instrument.

It has four strings in four courses and is tuned E, A, D, G. Three of the strings are made of silk and the highest is steel.

It was developed through a rationalization of an earlier Turkic instrument (the kopuz), and used the Chinese name for that instrument. Three models were developed, soprano alto and tenor.

== History ==
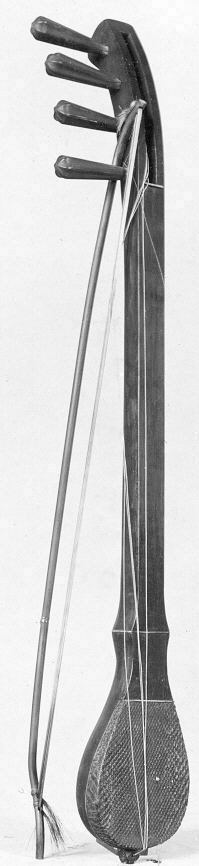
A historical 19th century huobosi.

The Huobosi is played by the Naxi people in China, and was historically a carved lute with a shape similar to the draynen. In modern times, the huobosi is built with a flat back and bent sides (ribs) in a similar shape, but with a generally shorter neck than the historical version.
