= ArchNet =

Digital humanities project on architecture and the built environment

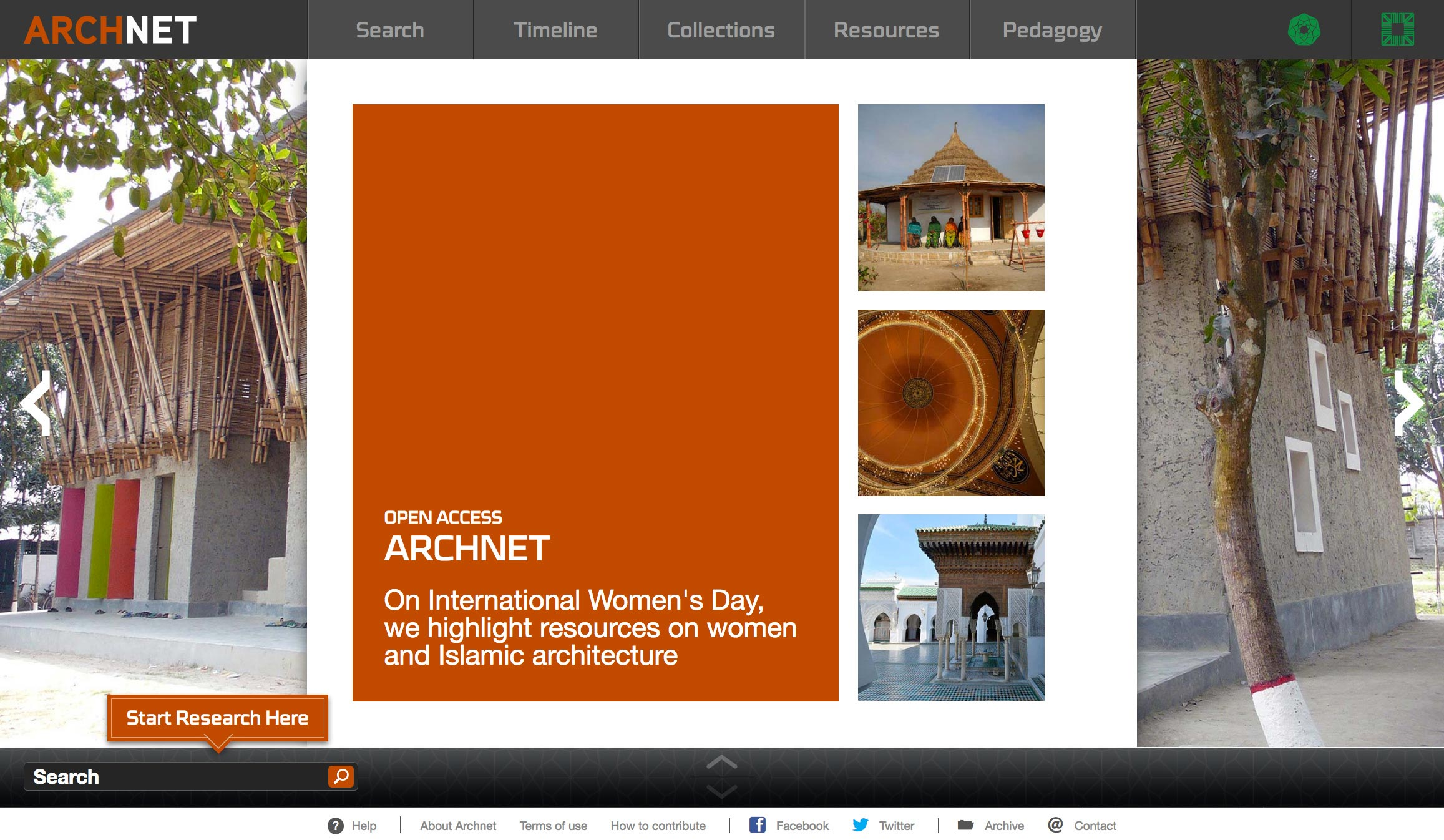
Archnet homepage, March 8, 2018.

Archnet logo (2002–2013)

Archnet is a collaborative digital humanities project focused on Islamic architecture and the built environment of Muslim societies. Conceptualized in 1998 and originally developed at the MIT School of Architecture and Planning in co-operation with the Aga Khan Trust for Culture. It has been maintained by the Aga Khan Documentation Center at MIT and the Aga Khan Trust for Culture since 2011.

Archnet is an open access resource providing all users with resources on architecture, urban design and development in the Muslim world.

== History and Conceptualization ==
The Aga Khan Trust for Culture (AKTC) is an agency of the Aga Khan Development Network (AKDN). Through various programmes, partnerships, and initiatives, the AKTC seeks to improve the built environment in Asia and Africa where there is a significant Muslim presence. Archnet complements the work of the Trust by making its resources digitally accessible to individuals worldwide.

Archnet was conceptualized in 1998 during a series of discussions between Aga Khan IV; the President of the Massachusetts Institute of Technology (MIT) Charles Vest; and the Dean of MIT’s School of Architecture and Planning, William J. Mitchell. The foundations of Archnet were predicated on remarks made by Aga Khan in Istanbul in 1983, about his desire to make available the extensive dossiers resulting from the nominations for the Aga Khan Award for Architecture (AKAA) for the purpose of “[assisting] those institutions where the professionals of the future are trained.”

The purpose of the website is to create a viable platform upon which knowledge pertaining to the field of architecture can be shared. Archnet aims to expand the general intellectual frame of reference to transcend the barriers of geography, socio-economic status and religion, and to foster a spirit of collaboration and open dialogue. Archnet therefore manifests many of the Aga Khan’s values and principles regarding not only rural and urban development but also pluralism and the role of culture, while exemplifying MIT’s OpenCourseWare initiative, giving everyone access to its course material free of charge.

The website came to fruition in 2000 and was officially launched on September 27, 2002 by Lawrence Summers, then President of Harvard University; Charles Vest, then President of MIT; and the Aga Khan. It continues to grow with new institutional partners in North America and abroad as well as individual users. Today it has over seventy-five thousand users — fifty percent of whom are students or teachers — representing over one hundred fifty countries and averaging over five thousand unique visitors a day.

In 2011 Archnet became a collaboration between the Aga Khan Trust for Culture (AKTC) and the newly created Aga Khan Documentation Center at MIT (AKDC @ MIT). After assessing ten years of data on the use of the site and its impact of the material it contains on teaching, learning, and the practice of architecture in Muslim societies, the redevelopment of Archnet begin and 2013. Registration, logins and all barriers to access were removed when the new version of the site, Archnet 2.0, launched in January 2014.

== Partners and resources ==
Archnet makes accessible an extensive collection of resources from numerous participating institutions for students, educators, and professionals, and is a particularly useful tool for individuals who have limited access to architectural publications. The online library first consisted of two hundred thousand images held by the Aga Khan Trust for Culture, and four hundred thousand held by MIT and Harvard University, but has grown considerably because of over 1,000 individuals and institutions who have contributed resources. The library is made up of photographs, line drawings, CAD drawings, published papers, video, and text resources including the Dictionary of Islamic Architecture.

A considerable portion of the resources come from the archives of the Aga Khan Program for Islamic Architecture at Harvard and MIT. Other important institutions that share their extensive archives include the Department of Architecture and Design at the American University of Beirut, the Department of Architecture at the American University of Sharjah, the Center for the Study of the Built Environment, the Faculty of Architecture at the University of Damascus, the Erciyes University Architectural Association, the Indian National Trust for Art and Cultural Heritage, the Faculty of Architecture of Istanbul Technical University, the Department of Architecture at Middle East Technical University, the Department of Architecture at Misr International University, the Rizvi College of Architecture, and the Faculty of the Built Environment at Universiti Teknologi MARA in Malaysia.

Because of the Trust’s programming activities, such as the Historic Cities Support Programme and the Aga Khan Award for Architecture, significant case studies are conducted, yielding valuable research that is made available through Archnet.

The collection also comprises the archives of the French architect-planner Michel Ecochard and the Egyptian architect Hassan Fathy, winner of the first AKAA Chairman’s Award in 1980, archives of the founders of the School of Architecture at the University of Baghdad, and others.

== Site Content ==
With the relaunch of Archnet in 2013, the directors decided to make the resource completely open access, with no barriers to use, including logins. Archnet's user community was notified to remove content from all proprietary user spaces, and the discussion forum was archived. Announcements and other current information are now posted on Archnet's social media presences.

Archnet's digital library includes:

- Publications/files – books, journals, presentation boards, architectural drawings, presentations, project reports, and the like. Journals available on Archnet include full runs and complete contents of journals that has ceased publication, such as ''Majallat al-Imarah (مجلة العِمارة), Mimar: Architecture in Development, and Environmental Design: Journal of the Islamic Environmental Design Research Centre; current journals, excluding the last three years; and an electronic journal, the International Journal of Architectural Research (IJAR).
- Video/audio – Includes recordings, interviews, lectures, scholarly presentations, 3D visualizations, and special collections such as the Music of Morocco.
- Images – Currently the largest component of the collection, Archnet images include historical and contemporary images such as architectural drawings, digital photographs, digitized negatives, photographs, and slides, and engravings. There are general views of cities and individual buildings, as well as detail views of particular features.
- Associated names – These include architects, patrons, designers, authors, artists, photographers, clients, and any other persons associated with a record. As of March 1, 2018, there were nearly 7,000 name records in the database.
- Collections – A selection of related items such as architects' archives, publication series, regional surveys, reference works, and resources of various initiatives of the Aga Khan Development Network, including the Aga Khan Museum, the Aga Khan Program for Islamic Architecture at Harvard and MIT, the Aga Khan Award for Architecture, and the Aga Khan Historic Cities Programme.

Institutional sections highlight projects, research, courses and publications of Archnet partners. The Pedagogy Project provides access to syllabi, course information, and pedagogy with a special emphasis on Islamic architecture. The items in the collection come from academic institutions around the world. Timeline provides a visual representation of some of the most often studied period and sites in the history of Islamic architecture.

=== IJAR ===
The ArchNet International Journal of Architectural Research (IJAR) is an online academic blind-reviewed publication on architecture, planning and built environment studies. The journal “aims at strengthening ties between scholars from different parts of the world” as well as bridging the gap between the theory and practice of Architecture with a special focus on architecture and planning in the developing world. The concept of the journal was first developed in 1999 when Shiraz Allibhai, then a project officer with the Aga Khan Trust for Culture, was responsible for coordinating the efforts of creating Archnet. The journal was developed at the MIT School of Architecture and Planning with the support of the Aga Khan Trust for Culture and debuted in March 2007 and is currently under the editorship of Ashraf M. Salama. It is published by Archnet three times a year (in March, July and November) on the internet.

The journal typically features articles written by architects, interior designers, planners, and landscape architects working at both public and private institutions. It addresses academics, practitioners, and students of architecture and interior design and in general those who are “interested in developing their understanding and enhancing their knowledge about how environments are designed, created, and used in physical, social, cultural, economic, and aesthetic terms”.

== See also ==
- List of professional architecture organizations
