= Temir komuz =

Musical Instrument

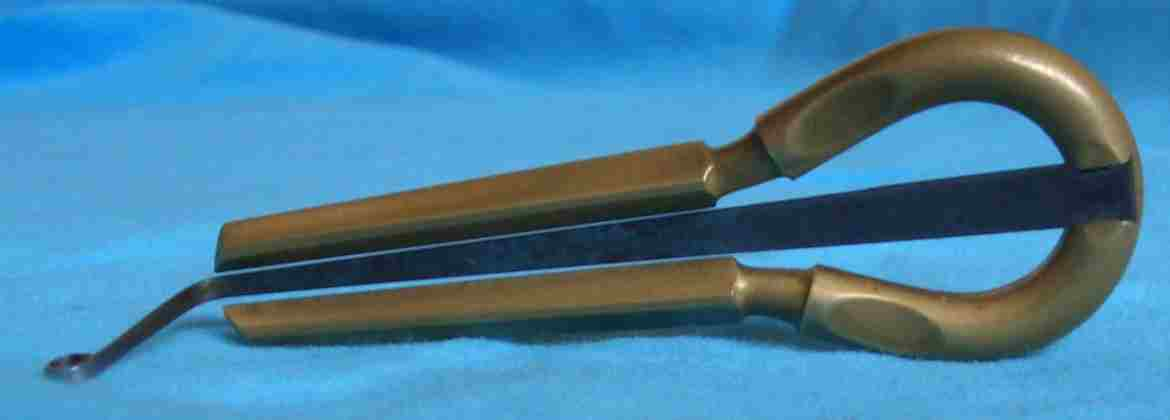
Altai khomus/kamus (Listen)

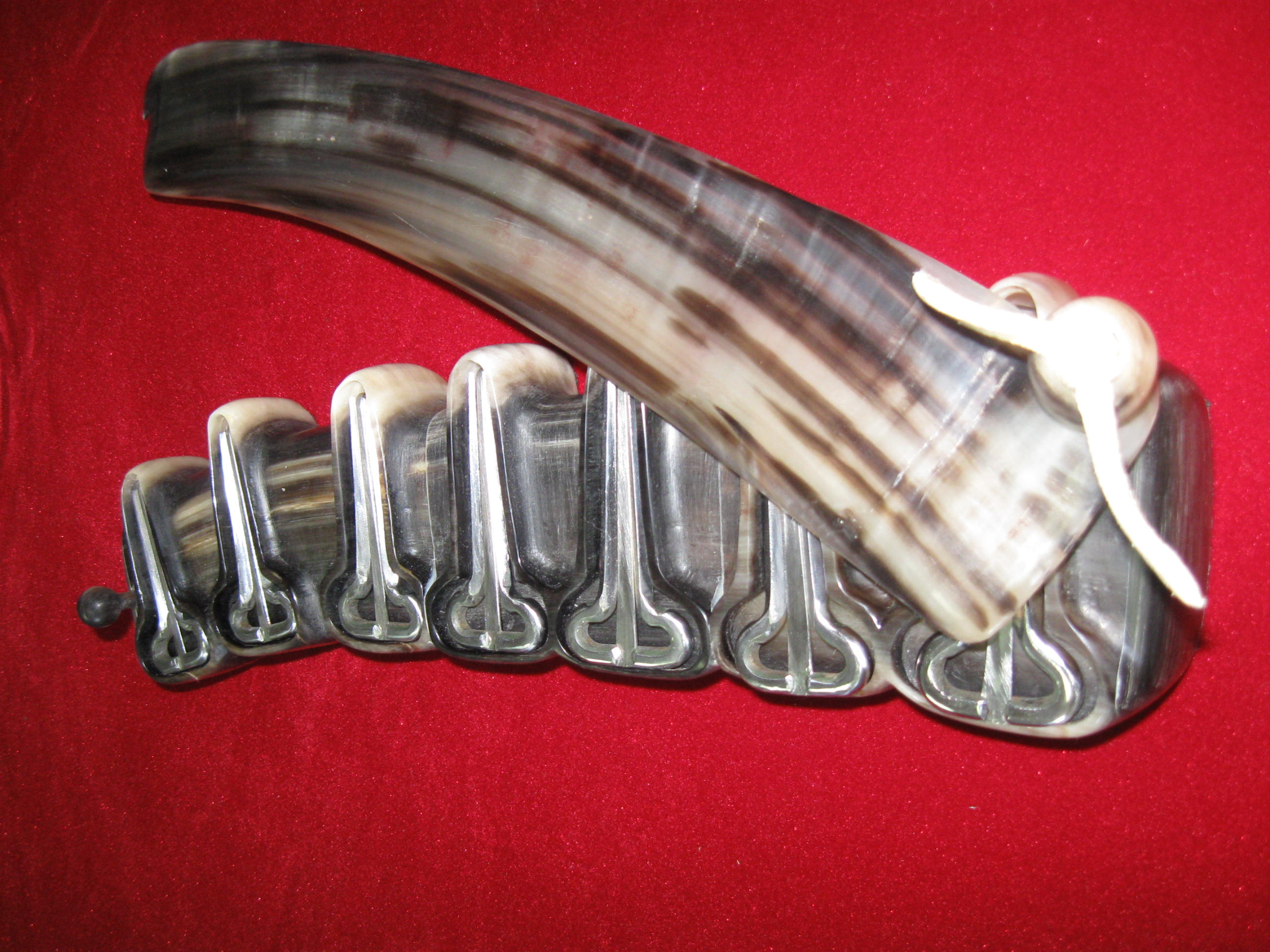
7 tuned komuz

The temir komuz (sometimes temir qomuz meaning 'iron komuz/qomuz', ooz komuz meaning 'mouth komuz', or gubuz) is a Kyrgyz jaw harp, while the komuz is a three-stringed fretless lute. As an instrument, the temir komuz is unrelated to the komuz in terms of style and structure; however, it takes its name from the other popular Turkic instrument.

The stringed komuz is used by Turkic people living in central Asia e.g., Kyrgyz, Uzbeks, Kazakhs, Turkmens, and Uyghurs, as well as by Azeri, Turkish, and Yakut people. In fact, komuz is cognate for the names of several musical instruments, used extensively by Turkic people and key to the music of Central Asia, just as Kazakh kobyz (Uzbek qo'biz) (bowed instruments), the Tuvan and Sakha or Yakut xomus (a jaw harp), Azeri gopuz, Dagestan agach komus, Avar people temur, and Turkish kopuz.

The oldest known komuz-like instrument dates from the 4th century although the related Azerbaijani gopuz is believed to date back to 6000 BCE following an archaeological discovery of clay plates depicting gopuz players. In the 1960s American archeologists working in the Shushdagh mountains near the ancient city of Jygamish in Iranian Azerbaijan, uncovered a number of rare clay plates which dated back to around 6000 BCE which depicted musicians at a council, holding a komuz-like instrument to their chests. The golcha gopuz was mentioned in the epic Book of Dede Korkut.

The temir komuz is made of iron usually with a length of 100–200 mm (3.9–7.9 in) and with a width of approximately 2–7 mm (0.08–0.28 in). The range of the instrument varies with the size of the instrument, but generally hovers around an octave span. The Kyrgyz people are unusually proficient on the temir komuz instrument and it is quite popular among children. However, some adults continue to play the instrument.

There is a National Artist of Kyrgyz Republic who performs on the instrument. One time twenty Kyrgyz girls played in a temir komuz ensemble on the stage of the Bolshoi Theater in Moscow. Temir komuz pieces have been notated by Aleksandr Zataevich in two or three parts. Apparently an octave drone is possible, or even an ostinato alternating the fifth step of a scale with an octave.

== In Turkic traditional music ==
The instrument is also used by Sakha or Yakut people, and in Tuvan music with the name xomus. It was introduced to Hungary by the Cuman people.

A Kyrgyz marionette play called tak-teke (jumping-goat) features the temir komuz; the player attaches a small goat figure to a string and ties the string to their right hand. They move the puppet skillfully while playing the instrument.
