= Iulia Dombrovskaia =

Russian pediatrician (1891–1976)

Iulia Fominichna Dombrovskaia
- Born: 11 December 1891; Yelets, Russian Empire
- Died: 1976
- Education: St Petersburg Women’s Medical Institute (M.D., Doctor of Sciences)
- Awards: Academician; Lenin Prize
- Scientific career
- Fields: Pediatrics
- Workplaces: I.M. Sechenov First Moscow Institute of Medicine; Moscow City Department of Mother and Child Care

Iulia Dombrovskaia (11 December 1891 – 1976) was a Russian pediatrician.

== Life and work ==
Iulia Fominichna Dombrovskaia was born in Yelets, in the Russian Empire, on 11 December 1891. She was awarded her M.D. from the St Petersburg Women’s Medical Institute in 1913 and was appointed as an assistant professor in the children's clinic of the I.M. Sechenov First Moscow Institute of Medicine three years later. She was also head of the Moscow City Department of Mother and Child Care from 1918 to 1921. Dombrovskaia was awarded her Doctor of Sciences degree in 1936 by the St Petersburg Women’s Medical Institute and promoted to professor at the I.M. Sechenov First Moscow Institute of Medicine that same year. She became head of the clinic in 1951 and was a delegate to the Ninth International Congress of Pediatricians in Montreal, Canada, eight years later. Dombrovskaia was awarded the Lenin Prize in 1970 and became a member of the Soviet Academy of Medicine at an unknown date. Her death date is unknown. "Dombrovskaia’s research was in the field of children’s diseases, particularly respiratory disorders, dystrophy, and avitaminosis and child pathology."
