= Bystraya Sosna =

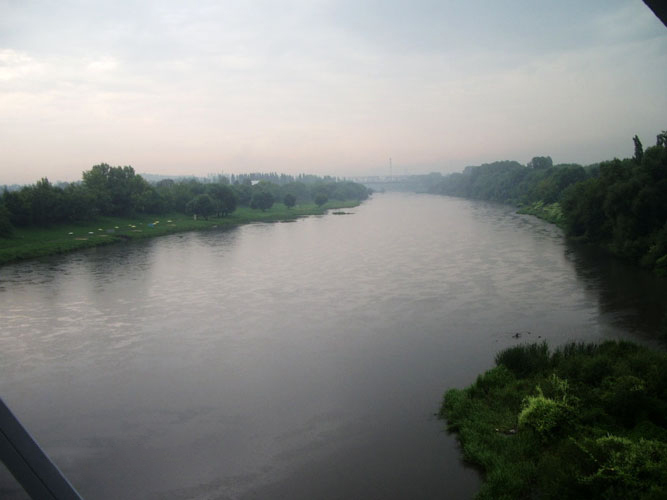
- Native name: Быстрая Сосна (Russian)

Location
- Country: Russia

Physical characteristics
- Mouth: Don
  - coordinates: 52.7022°N 38.9031°E
- Length: 296 km (184 mi)
- Basin size: 17,400 km^{2} (6,700 sq mi)

Basin features
- Progression: Don→ Sea of Azov
- Tributaries
  - left: Livenka

The Bystraya Sosna (Russian: Бы́страя Сосна́) is a river in Oryol and Lipetsk oblasts in Russia. It is a right tributary of the Don, and it is 296 kilometres (184 mi) long, with a drainage basin of 17,400 square kilometres (6,700 mi^{2}). The river is usually frozen over from the end of November until the end of March.

The towns of Livny and Yelets are along the river.
