= Livenka (rural locality) =

Livenka (Russian: Ливенка) is the name of several rural localities in Russia:

- Livenka, Belgorod Oblast, a selo in Krasnogvardeysky District of Belgorod Oblast
- Livenka, Kostroma Oblast, a village in Klevantsovskoye Settlement of Ostrovsky District of Kostroma Oblast
- Livenka, Pavlovsky District, Voronezh Oblast, a selo in Livenskoye Rural Settlement of Pavlovsky District of Voronezh Oblast
- Livenka, Semiluksky District, Voronezh Oblast, a village in Zemlyanskoye Rural Settlement of Semiluksky District of Voronezh Oblast

== See also ==
- Dalnaya Livenka, a selo in Gubkinsky District of Belgorod Oblast
