= Livenka (music) =

Type of Russian button accordion

The livenka (Russian: ливенка) or Livenskaya garmoshka (Russian: Ливенская гармошка) is a specific variety of accordion used in Russian folk music, specifically in the region around the town of Livny (Oryol Oblast), from which the instrument takes its name.

== Description ==
- The livenka is a unisonoric instrument, meaning that each button produces the same tone, regardless of the direction of the bellows.
- The right-hand buttons (of which there may be 12 to 15) play the notes of the obikhodnyy pitch set, which may also be thought of as a series of overlapping Mixolydian modes. (Banin, A.A. 1997. p.161)
- The left-hand levers play intervals of thirds or fourths, so that adjacent levers operated simultaneously will play a triad.
- The livenka has a very long bellows, when compared to other accordions—sometimes having forty folds, and extending to over a meter in length.

== History ==
The name of the inventor of the livenka was not preserved. It is believed to have been developed in the second half of the 19th century as a modification of existing German or Russian button accordions.

== Bibliography ==
- Banin A.A. Russkaia instrumentalnaia muzyka folklornoi traditsii. Moscow, 1997. (p.159-163)
- Blagodatov G.I. Russkaia garmonika. Leningrad, 1960.
- Egorov S.P. Noveishyi prakticheskii samouchitel dlia ruchnoi garmoniki roialnogo stroia - viatskoi, livenskoi i klarnetnoi. "Baian". Smolensk, 1903.
- Mirek A.M. Spravochnik po garmonikam. Moscow, 1968.
- Mirek A.M. I zvuchit garmonika. Moscow, 1979.
- Rodin E. Novyi samouchitel i sbornik pesen dlia odnoriadnoi livenskoi garmonii. Saint Petersburg, 1906.
