= Livenka (river) =

Livenka Russian: Ливенка
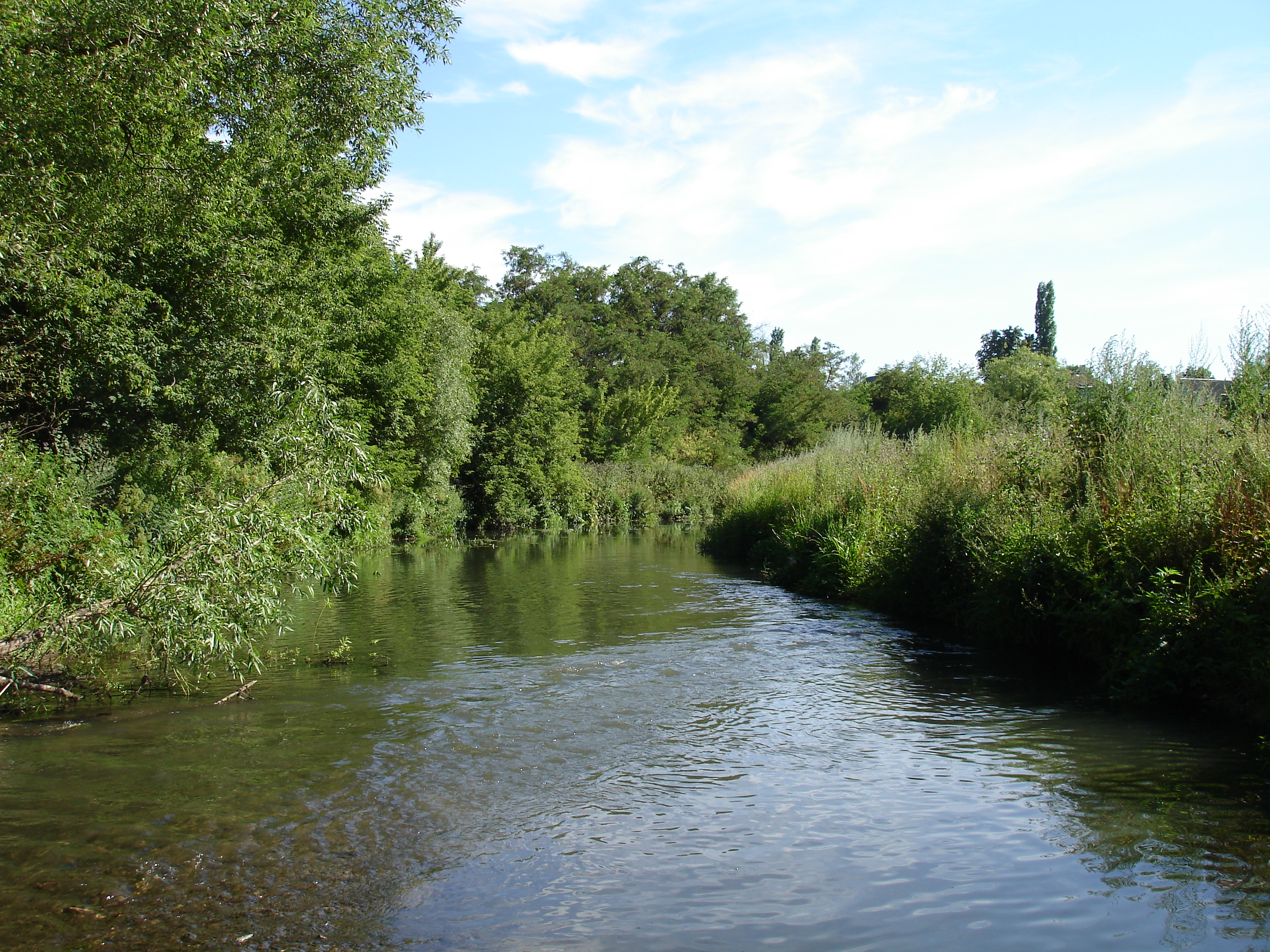

Location
- Country: Russia
- City: Livny

Physical characteristics
- Source
  - location: Livensky District
- Mouth: Bystraya Sosna
  - location: Livny
  - coordinates: 52.4119°N 37.6144°E
- Length: 32 km (20 mi)
- Basin size: 318 km^{2} (123 sq mi)

Basin features
- Progression: Bystraya Sosna→ Don→ Sea of Azov

The Livenka (Russian: Ливенка) is a river in Oryol Oblast, Russia. It is a left tributary of the Bystraya Sosna. It is 32 kilometres (20 mi) long, and has a drainage basin of 318 square kilometres (123 sq mi). The river usually freezes over from the end of November until the end of March.

The town of Livny is situated by the river.

== Main inflows ==
- Lesnaya Livenka
- Polevaya Livenka
- Unnamed lake in Livensky District
