= Kumuz =

Turkic stringed musical instrument

String instrument
- Other names: Agach-kumuz
- Classification: Plucked

Related instruments
- Komuz; Kobza; Cobza; Phondar; Panduri; Pandura; Pandur; Fandyr

The kumuz (Kumyk: къумуз, хомус, romanized: qumuz, xomus) or agach-kumuz (Kumyk: агъач-къумуз, romanized: ağaç-qumuz) is a stringed instrument used by the Kumyks of Dagestan, in the Russian Caucasus. It has three strings and is fretted. Scholars have noticed the similarity in name to the Kyrgyz komuz, but note the kumuz is perhaps more closely related to the other lutes of the Caucasus.

Legendarily, the Kumyk poet Irchi Kozak cured the sick with the music of his agach-kumuz.

== See also ==
- Chonguri, Georgian fretless lute
- Panduri, Georgian fretted lute
