= Aga Khan Music Initiative in Central Asia =

The Aga Khan Music Initiative in Central Asia was established in 2000 by His Highness the Aga Khan with the aim of assisting in the preservation of Central Asia's musical heritage by ensuring its transmission to a new generation of artists and audiences, both inside the region and beyond its borders. An initiative of the Aga Khan Trust for Culture, an agency of the Aga Khan Development Network, AKMICA morphed into AKMP, the Aga Khan Music Programme, having since 2008 expanded its activities beyond Central Asia to encompass Middle East and Northern Africa, South Asia and West Africa.

== Programmes ==
=== Support for Tradition Bearers ===
AKMICA supports a group of musical tradition-bearers who are revitalising important musical repertories throughout Central Asia by transmitting their traditions to students. Formerly inaugurated in 2003, the Programme operates in Afghanistan, Kazakhstan, Kyrgyzstan, Tajikistan, and Uzbekistan. The programme is based on a traditional process of apprenticeship known as ustad-shagird, in which master musicians provide intensive instruction rooted in oral transmission of a repertory.

Throughout Central Asia, AKMICA-sponsored tradition-bearers work both in self-initiated music centres and schools, and within guild-like networks that encourage collegiality and communication among independent master teachers. As part of their mission of promoting musical transmission, tradition-bearer centres work to develop new materials and methodologies for teaching traditional music, involve students in ethnographic documentation of local traditions, and work toward building appreciation of authentic traditional music among audiences in Central Asia. AKMICA provides administrative and financial support to centres and schools, and in some cases, a stipend to students. Support is renewed on the basis of an annual review with the longterm goal of helping centres, schools, and guilds to become self-supporting.

In Afghanistan, launched in late 2003 an expanded starting 2006, the Ustâd Shâgird Music Training Programme in Kabul and Herat offered music masters returning to Afghanistan an opportunity to offer instruction to groups of local youth. With the conservative regime change in 2021, the music education programme was discontinued, many music master educators having left the country.

In Kazakhstan, started in 2003 by an initiative group constituted of Abdulkhamit Raimbergenov, Saira Raimbergenova and Ulzhan Baibossynova, Murager project worked on establishing music education for general secondary schools with 14 schools involved, Murager music education programme grew in a sustainable manner, involving between 2 and 10 schools yearly to reach these figures. In 10 years, 2375 dombras were distributed to schools, serving teachers and students. Launched on the basis of one single private school, art college Kokil in Almaty then to fourteen public secondary schools, Murager expanded to 85 schools, benefiting to almost 10 000 students since its creation.

=== Music Touring and Festivals ===
The Music Touring and Festivals Programme was created to celebrate Central Asian musical traditions in regions where they are little known, and integrate leading exponents of these traditions into the global network of music presenting institutions. The Programme toured Europe in 2002, visiting France, Italy, Germany, Belgium, and the Netherlands.

In 2003, AKMICA conceived and co-produced a festival programme Via Kaboul: Musiques de l'Asie centrale sans frontières in Paris, France. Three theatricalised concerts performed at Odéon-Théâtre de l'Europe featured twenty musicians and dancers from Afghanistan, Iran, Kyrgyzstan, Tajikistan, and Uzbekistan, together with lectures at the Musée Guimet and workshops and master classes at the Maison Populaire de Montreuil.

In 2004, AKMICA prepared an expanded five-week-long tour, which included major performances at the Festival de la Musique Sacrée in Dijon, France, the English National Opera in London, the Ultima Festival in Oslo, and the World Music Expo WOMEX in Essen, Germany as well as at venues in Brussels, Turin, and Milan. The tour programme also featured numerous educational events such as workshops, lecture demonstrations, and master classes.

In 2005 in Issyk-Kul, Kyrgyzstan, AKMICA gathered artists, music educators and their students from its programmes in Kazakhstan, Kyrgyzstan, Uzbekistan and Tajikistan for a summer school, having also partnered with Morocco’s Fes Festival of World sacred Music to present Badakhshan ensemble from Tajikistan, Tengir Too from Kyrgyzstan and Maqam Academy from Tajikistan.

In 2006, Homayoun Sakhi from Afghanistan, Maqam Academy from Tajikistan and Tengir Too ensemble from Kyrgyzstan toured the United States, with another tour in 2008 featuring Azerbaijan’s Alim and Gargana Qasimov, Afghanistan’s Salar Nader and Homayoun Sakhi, as well as Abbos Kosimov from Uzbekistan.

=== Documentation and Dissemination ===
AKMICA is involved in a long-term collaboration with the Center for Folklife and Cultural Heritage of the Smithsonian Institution, the national museum and research complex of the United States, to create a ten-volume Anthology of Central Asian Music. The Anthology will consist primarily of new recordings as well as selected archival recordings drawn from important collections in Central Asia, and will be released worldwide by Smithsonian Folkways Recordings.

The first three volumes feature musicians from Kyrgyzstan, Tajikistan, Uzbekistan, and Afghanistan. Future releases in the Anthology series will feature music from Badakhshan, Kazakhstan, Qaraqalpakstan, and Uzbekistan.

=== Silk Road Project Collaboration ===
The Silk Road Project and its performance unit, the Silk Road Ensemble, was established by Yo-Yo Ma in 1998 to explore the rich cultural traditions of the Silk Road - the historic trade route that connected the peoples and traditions of Asia with those of Europe. The Aga Khan Trust for Culture was a founding partner of the Project, and through AKMICA has supported and participated in festivals, concert tours, recordings and innovative collaborations.

In 2003 AKMICA presented Yo-Yo Ma and the Silk Road Ensemble in a nine-day concert tour of Central Asia featuring concerts and workshops in Bishkek, Almaty, and Dushanbe. The partnership has been extended to develop multimedia programmes for a new “Museum Initiative” in which works of visual art join traditions of oral literature and world music through performances, exhibitions, and educational events in some of the world's leading museums. Multimedia programmes have been presented at the Peabody Essex Museum in Salem, Massachusetts and, at the British Library in London, accompanying the exhibition “The Silk Road: Trade, Travel, War and Faith”.

== See also ==
- Aga Khan Trust for Culture
- Aga Khan Development Network
- Music of Asia
- Silk Road Project
