= Music of Central Asia =

The musical traditions of Central Asia mirror the immense diversity found in the cultures and populations residing in the region. Principal instrument types are two- or three-stringed lutes, the necks either fretted or fretless; fiddles made of horsehair; flutes, mostly open at both ends and either end-blown or side-blown; and Jew's harps, mostly metal. Percussion instruments include frame drums and tamtam. The bowed string is thought to originate with nomads who mainly used the snakeskin-covered horsetail-bowed lute. In Mongolia instruments like the morin khuur or horse-head fiddle survive today.

The fiddle is widespread in the Gobi areas of central Mongolia and among Eastern Mongols, the khuuchir and Dörvön chikhtei khuur being a two- and four-stringed spiked fiddle respectively. The resonator can be cylindrical or polygonal and made of either wood or metal. The face is covered with sheepskin or snakeskin with the belly or back left open to act as the sound hole. The strings are either gut or metal and are pulled towards the shaft (spike) by a loop of string and metal ring midway between the tuning pegs and the body. A horse-hair bow is threaded between the strings which are tuned a fifth apart. The Darhads of Hövsgöl province, north-west Mongolia, call it hyalgasan huur, and it is played predominantly by female ensemble-performers. The 12th-century Yüan-Shih describes the two-string fiddle, xiqin, bowed with a piece of bamboo between the strings, used by Mongols. During the Manchu dynasty, a similar two-string instrument bowed with a horsehair bow threaded between the strings was used in Mongolian music.

The khuuchir is tuned in the interval of a fifth and is small or medium-sized, has a small, cylindrical, square or cup-like resonator made of bamboo, wood or copper, covered with snake skin, through which is passed a wooden spike. The neck is inserted in the body of the instrument. A bridge, standing on the skin table, supports two gut or steel strings, which pass up the rounded, fretless neck to two posterior pegs and down to the bottom, where they are attached to the spike protruding from the body. A small metal ring, attached to a loop of string tied to the neck, pulls the strings towards it and can be adjusted to alter the pitch of the open strings. The thick bass string is situated to the left of the thin high string in frontal aspect. The bow's horsetail hair is inseparably interlaced with the strings.

Other similar instruments have two courses of two silk strings, the first and the third at the tonic, the second and fourth at the upper fifth. On four-string types, the bow hair is divided into two strands, one fixed between the first and second strings, the other between the third and fourth. Chikhtei means "ear" in Mongolian so the name of the instrument there also translates as “four-eared” instrument.

The Buryat huchir is mostly made of wood rather than metal. Buryats use silk or metal strings, tuned in fifths in the case of the four-string instrument. The huchir is related to the Mongolian huuchir.

The musician rests the body of the instrument on the left upper thigh, close to the belly, with the table directed diagonally across the body and the neck leaning away. The thumb of the left hand rests upright along the neck of the instrument. Horsehairs of the arched bamboo bow are divided into two sections so that one section passes over the bass string and the other over the top string. The bow is held underhand with a loose wrist. The index finger rests on the wood, and the bow hairs pass between middle and ring finger to both regulate the tension of the hairs and direct them. To sound the thick string one has to pull one section of bow hairs with the ring finger, and to sound the thin string, to push the other section. Strings are touched lightly on top by the fingertips. In modern ensemble orchestras, there are small-, medium- and large-sized huchir.

== Instruments ==
- Choor (Kyrgyz national instrument), a type of end-blown flute of varying lengths, with 4 to 5 holes made with reed or wood. Common among Inner Asian pastoralists, this instrument is also known as tsuur (Mongolian), chuur (Tuvan) and sybyzghy (Kazakh).
- Chopo choor, an ocarina made of clay with 3 to 6 holes, popular with children in Kyrgyzstan.
- Dayra, a frame drum with jingles played by men and women among sedentary populations in Central Asia.
- Dombra, a class of two-stringed, long-necked lutes, the best known of which is a fretted lute that is considered Kazakhstan's national instrument. It is mostly used to play solo instrumental pieces known as kui. The dombra also provides accompaniment to Kazakh jyrau (bards) and singers of bel canto (lyrical song).
- Dutar, a variety of two-stringed long-necked fretted lutes among Uzbeks, Uyghurs, Tajiks, Turkmens, Karakalpaks and Afghans.
- Garmon, a small accordion among khalfa (female wedding entertainers) in the Khorezm region of northwestern Uzbekistan.
- Ghijak, a round-bodied spike fiddle with 3 or 4 metal strings and a short fretless neck used by Uyghurs, Uzbeks, Tajiks, Turkmens and Karakalpaks.
- Jaw harps, called by a variety of names, including temir komuz, traditionally used by pastoralists throughout Inner Asia. They are typically made out of wood or metal.
- Komuz, a three-stringed, fretless long-neck lute typically made from apricot wood, nut wood or juniper wood. It is the principal folk instrument of the Kyrgyz. Playing techniques include plucking, strumming, and striking the strings with the fingernails, together with the use of stylised hand and arm gestures to add narrative to the performance.
- Kyl kyyak, the Kyrgyz name for an upright bowed fiddle with two horse hair strings. In Kazakhstan it is known as qylqobyz. The deck is usually made from camel or cow hide, and the body is carved from a single piece of wood, typically apricot wood. The instrument had a strong connection to both shamanism and the recitation of oral poetry.
- Rubab, a fretless lute with sympathetic strings played among sedentary populations in Central Asia.
- Rawap, a Uyghur long-necked lute similar to the rubab, but without sympathetic strings.
- Sato, a bowed tanbur, or long-necked lute, now rare, played by performers of Tajik-Uzbek classical music.
- Sybyzgy, a Kyrgyz sideblown flute traditionally played by shepherds and horse herders, made from apricot wood or the wood of mountain bushes. The sybyzgy has its own repertory of solo pieces, known as kuu, which are distinguished by their lyrical content.
- Tanbur, a long-necked plucked lute with raised frets used in Uzbek, Tajik and Uyghur classical music traditions. An Afghan variant has sympathetic strings.
- Tar, a double-chested, skin-topped, plucked lute with multiple sympathetic strings used in urban music from the Caucasus and Iran (the Iranian version does have sympathetic strings). The tar is also popular in Tajikistan and Uzbekistan.

== Preservation of Asian musical heritage ==
In 2000 the Aga Khan Trust for Culture established a music initiative to assist in the preservation of Central Asia's musical heritage. Known as the Aga Khan Music Initiative in Central Asia (AKMICA), the programme works with tradition-bearers throughout Central Asia to ensure that their traditions are passed down to a new generation of artists and audiences, inside and outside the region. AKMICA has also produced and sponsored music tours and festivals, is engaged in documentation and dissemination and collaborates with the Silk Road Project.
