= Cassotto =

Sound chamber in some accordions

A cassotto is a 'sound chamber' within some more expensive accordions that contains one or more reed blocks of the treble side of the instrument. The sound of a cassotto register is warmer, less sharp than that of a register with unenclosed reeds.

== Technology ==
The cassotto enclosure works as a passive frequency filter, attenuating higher frequencies and reinforcing lower ones (resonance). Instruments with cassotto have a sound quality distinctly different from instruments without.

Usually only some reed blocks are placed in the cassotto enclosure, typically for low reed sets 16' and/or 8'. The remaining treble reed blocks are mounted straight.

The firm Öllerer built a diatonic instrument with cassotto without register switches and two 8' (M) reed sets. Making a cassotto for diatonic instruments is quite more difficult due to the different reed plate arrangement. For chromatic accordions, a cassotto does not perform equally in every tone. On piano keyboards, the reed plates for black keys are usually located closer to the filling than those for most white keys. On chromatic button keyboards, two reed sets are typically distributed across 3 or 2 reed blocks (the latter solution often requiring particularly slim reed plates). The cassotto effect tends to be stronger the further the reed plates are from the filling.

Cassotto registers are only available on few (and usually higher quality) accordion models. Especially famous are the Beltuna, Pigini, Bugari and Öllerer models. In traditional German accordion making, the cassotto barely plays a role. One can find only a few cassotto registers in German accordions, but they can be found in the Hohner Morino and Gola models, and the Harmona (Klingenthal) Cassotta, Supra & Supita models.

There is a special construction in the Weltmeister Cassotta (374 + 414), also known as "Klingenthaler Spezialcassotto" or "Füllungscassotto". In those models the reed blocks are arranged in one plane like with ordinary accordions. The effect of cassotto is produced by a small "canopy" ("Vordach") under the treble hood forming the cassotto hollow. An advantage of this construction is that reed plates are better accessible for tuning than with a traditional cassotto construction.

== Sound ==
The effect of a cassotto is less pronounced with various instruments. The impact is therefore also not commonly evaluated. An individual assessment is required for each instrument. Oftentimes the cassotto sounds will be described as warm and chubby. Due to the filter effects, there are few strong, pronounced overtones.

There is some interaction between the types of sound materials and the cassotto.

Frequencies between 500 Hz and 1000 Hz will be strengthened in general, but not evenly. Some frequencies will stand out more than others, over 1000 Hz everything will be rather subdued.

The sound effects of the cassottos can be described as:

- The sound interference effect, corresponds to a spoken "o" or "a"
- The muffled sounds, in contrast, correspond to an "o" or "a" with umlauts.
