= Aftandil Israfilov =

Azerbaijani garmon player

- Born: January 24, 1941; Baku, Azerbaijan SSR, USSR
- Died: April 29, 2023 (aged 82) Baku, Azerbaijan
- Instrument: Garmon
- Burial place: II Alley of Honor
- Awards

Aftandil Eynulla oghlu Israfilov (Azerbaijani: Aftandil Eynulla oğlu İsrafilov; January 24, 1941 – April 29, 2023) was an Azerbaijani garmon player, People's Artiste of Azerbaijan (1998), People's Artist of the Dagestan (2008).

He was born on January 24, 1941, in Baku. In 1961, he was admitted to the civil construction faculty of the Polytechnic Institute. Due to his interest in garmon, he left his studies and dedicated his life to music.

Aftandil Israfilov creates an ensemble within "Azkonsert" and carries out artistic direction. Aftandil Israfilov, after touring Turkey together with Zeynab Khanlarova in 1970, performed in a series of concerts around the world as part of her ensemble. Aftandil Israfilov is the author of up to 100 musical moods such as "Zemfira", "Kamala", "Nazila", "Aynure", "Jala", "Basgalı".

He died on April 29, 2023, in Baku and was buried in the II Alley of Honor.

== Awards ==
- People's Artiste of Azerbaijan — May 24, 1998
- Personal Pension of the President of Azerbaijan — July 5, 2003
- People's Artist of Dagestan — April 28, 2008
- Shohrat Order — January 25, 2016
