= Aga Khan Trust for Culture =

Agency of the Aga Khan Development Network

- Abbreviation: AKTC
- Formation: 1988
- Headquarters: Geneva, Switzerland
- Affiliations: Aga Khan Development Network
- Website: AKTC

The Aga Khan Trust for Culture (AKTC) is an agency of the Aga Khan Development Network (AKDN), a family of institutions created by Aga Khan IV with distinct but complementary mandates to improve the welfare and prospects of people in the developing world, particularly in Asia and Africa. It focuses on the revitalization of communities in the Muslim world—physical, social, cultural, and economic. The AKTC was founded in 1988 and is registered in Geneva, Switzerland, as a private non-denominational philanthropic foundation.

== Programs ==
- Aga Khan Award for Architecture (AKAA) is an architectural prize that recognizes architectural excellence in the Muslim world.
- Aga Khan Historic Cities Programme (HCP) supports the revitalization of historic sites in the Muslim world.
- Aga Khan Music Initiative (AKMI) provides financial resources and technical assistance to support the preservation and promotion of professional oral tradition music in Central Asia and other regions.
- Aga Khan Program for Islamic Architecture (AKPIA) is an endowed center for the history, theory and practice of Islamic architecture at Harvard University and the Massachusetts Institute of Technology.
- ArchNet is a website on architecture, urban design, urban development, and related issues in the Muslim world, created in cooperation with MIT.
- Museums and Exhibitions refers to museum and exhibition projects, including the Aga Khan Museum in Toronto. It also displays exhibitions of pieces from its collection and provides support services for museums in the developing world, including the National Museum of Mali.

== Historic preservation ==
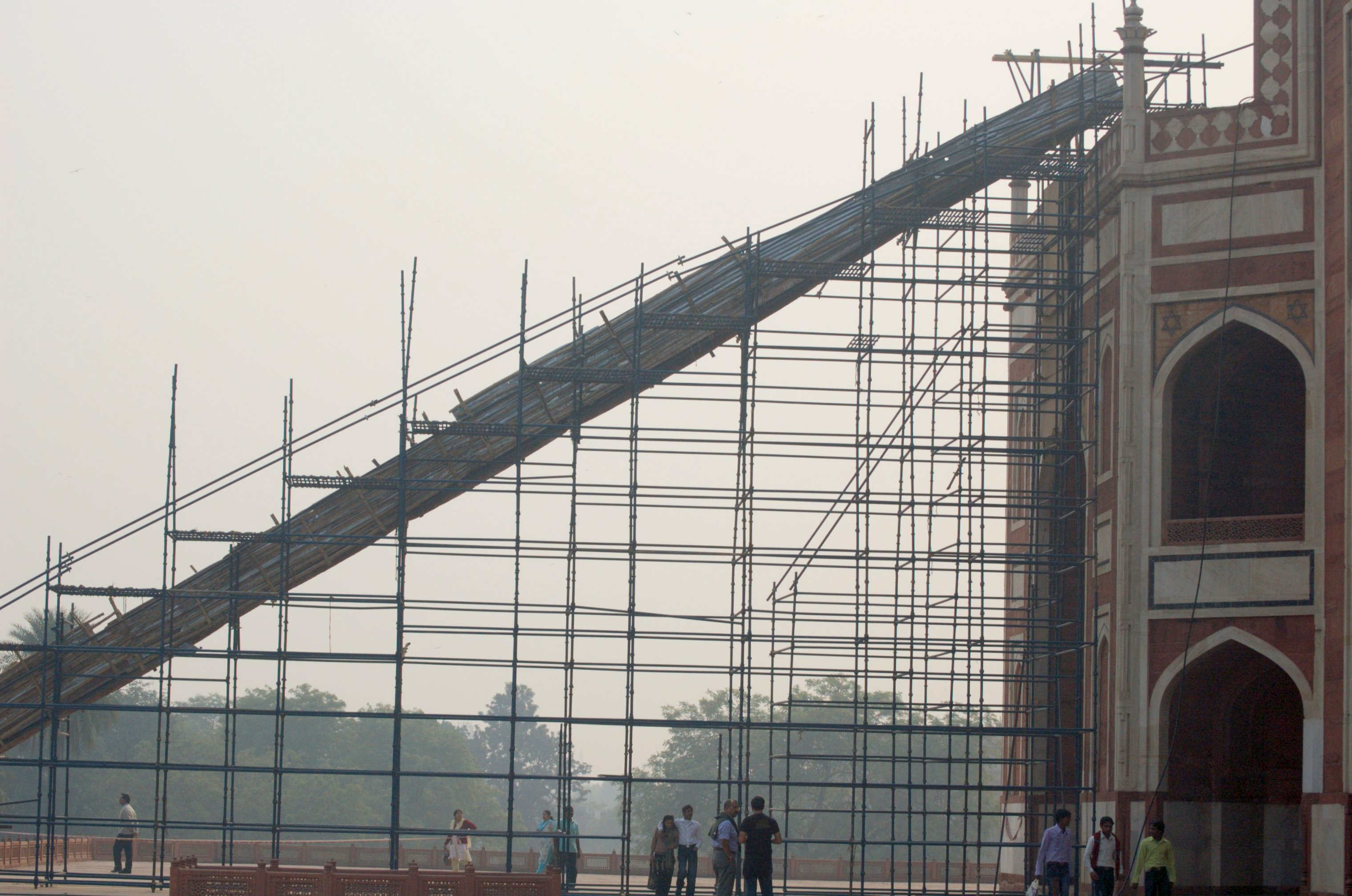
Extensive restoration work at Humayun's tomb was done by the trust in 2008

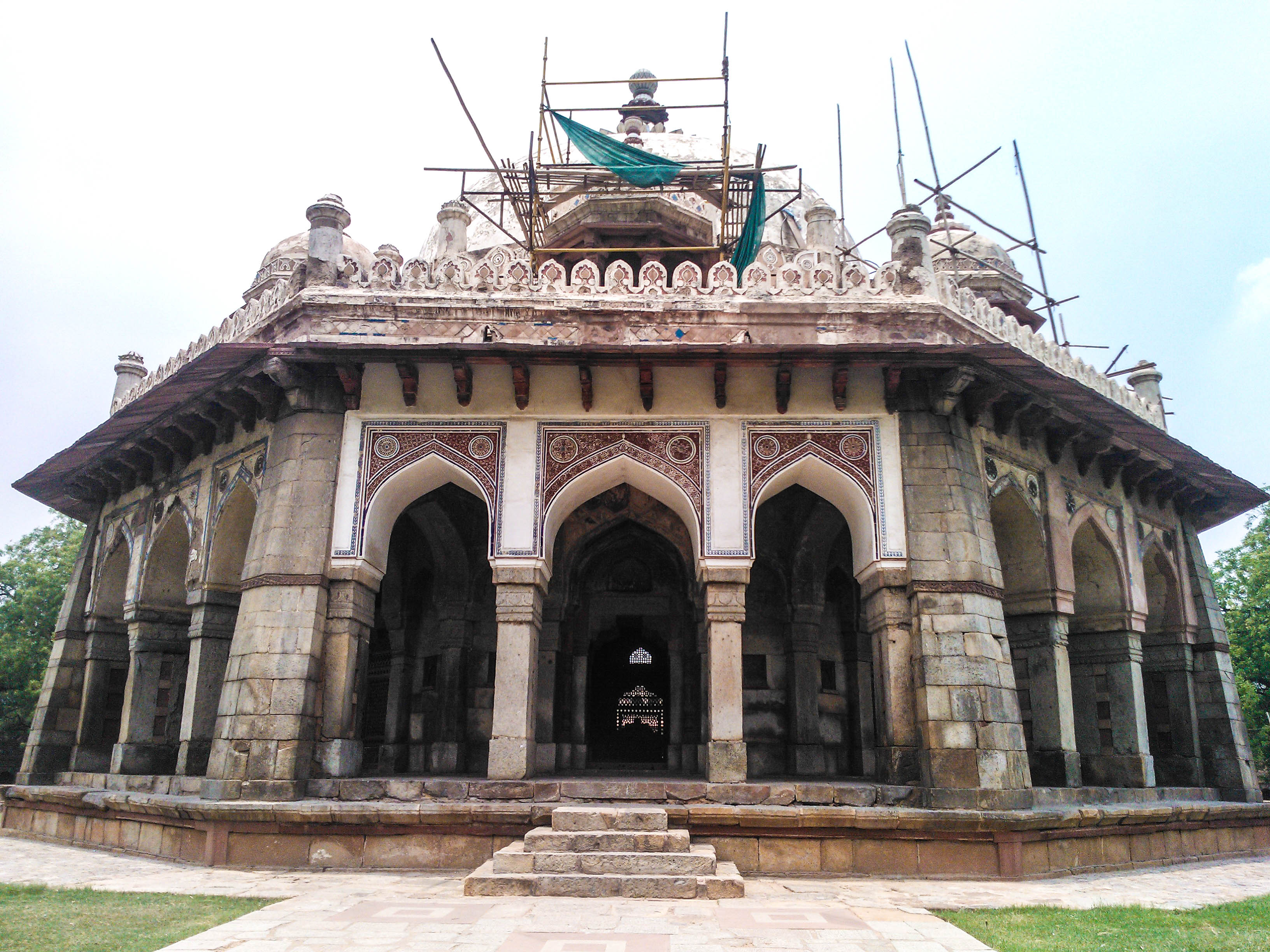
Restoration of Isa Khan's tomb in 2015

The trust has restored and rehabilitated over 350 monuments and historic sites all over the world, especially in south Asia. UNESCO also awarded it 13 heritage awards for excellence in restoration.

- Restoration of the Walled City of Lahore in partnership with the Government of Punjab.
- Restoration of Humayun's Tomb and water fountains in the gardens, 2007–2013
- Restoration of Sunder Nursery, New Delhi, 2007–2019. It created a 90-acre heritage garden with 15 historical monuments and over 300 tree species, making it Delhi's first arboretum. This 10-year project to restore the 16th-century garden to its former glory was done in collaboration with the Delhi Municipal Corporation and Central Public Works Department and Archaeological Survey of India, Government of India.
- Restoration tomb of Isa Khan, 2011–2015
- Restoration of the Qutb Shahi tombs in Hyderabad, India in collaboration with the Telangana State Archaeology and Museums Department.
- Restoration of the Sabz Burj close to Humayun's tomb, 2019–present
- Restoration of Lahore Fort Picture Wall, 2017–2019
- Restoration of the central souq in the Ancient City of Aleppo (Received ICCROM-Sharjah Award for Best Practice in Cultural Heritage Conservation and Management in the Arab region)
- Restoration of Tomb of Abdul Rahim Khan-I-Khana with the InterGlobe Foundation and the Archaeological Survey of India, 2014–2020
- Restoration of the Paigah Tombs and Saidani Ma Tomb in Hyderabad.

== Awards ==
- UNESCO 2020 Award for Special Recognition for Sustainable Development
- UNESCO 2020 Award for Excellence
