= Yelets =

City in Lipetsk Oblast, Russia

Yelets Елец
- City
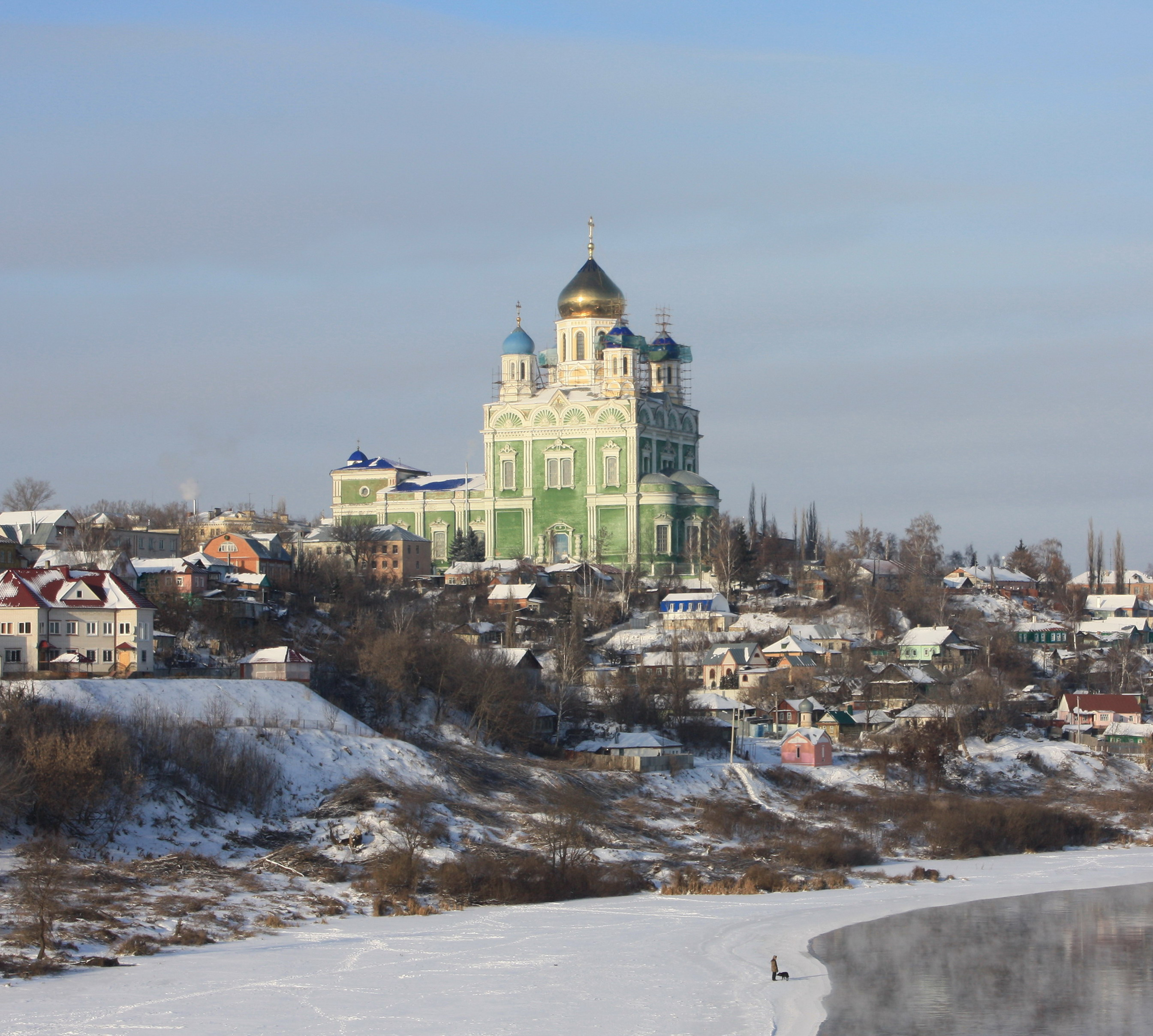
- Yelets Cathedral

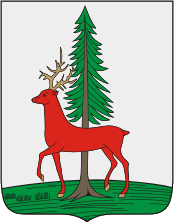
- Flag Coat of arms
- Interactive map of Yelets
- Location of Yelets Yelets (Lipetsk Oblast)
- Coordinates: 52°37′00″N 38°28′00″E
- Country: Russia
- Federal subject: Lipetsk Oblast
- First mentioned: 1146

Government
  - Head: Evgeny Borovskikh
- Elevation: 140 m (460 ft)

Population (2010 Census)
  - Total: 108,404
  - Estimate (2025): 93,761 (−13.5%)
  - Rank: 151st in 2010

Administrative status
  - Subordinated to: Yelets City Under Oblast Jurisdiction
  - Capital of: Yeletsky District, Yelets City Under Oblast Jurisdiction

Municipal status
  - Urban okrug: Yelets Urban Okrug
  - Capital of: Yelets Urban Okrug, Yeletsky Municipal District
- Time zone: UTC+3 (MSK)
- Postal code: 399770—399788
- Dialing code: +7 47467
- OKTMO ID: 42715000001
- Website: elets-adm.ru

Yelets or Elets (Russian: Елец) is a city in Lipetsk Oblast, Russia, situated on the Bystraya Sosna River, which is a tributary of the Don. Population: 99,875 (2021 census); 108,404 (2010 census); 116,726 (2002 census); 120,261 (1989 Soviet census).

== History ==
Yelets is the oldest center of the Central Black Earth Region. It was mentioned in historical documents as early as 1146 or 1147, when it was a fort belonging to the princes of Ryazan. The town's position at the very south of the Russian lands made it an easy prey for Turkic conquerors. The Mongols burned it in 1239, Uzbeg Khan ravaged it in 1316, Timur sacked it in 1395, and the Tatars devastated it in 1414.

In 1483, the Principality of Yelets was absorbed by the Grand Duchy of Moscow, while the local Rurikid rulers (last heard of in the 19th century) entered the service of Ivan III. In 1591, Boris Godunov revived the largely deserted town by establishing a fortress there. In 1618, the fortress was captured "by subterfuge" by 20,000 Cossacks under Petro Konashevych-Sahaidachny, allied with Władysław IV of Poland. They dismantled a large part of town fortifications.

In the 19th century, Yelets became the largest trade center of the region. Handmade lace has been a notable product of the city since then; other important industries are grain milling and the manufacture of machinery. The town's chief landmark is the vast Ascension Cathedral, built over the years 1845–1889 to a Neo-Muscovite design by Konstantin Thon.

In the 1930s the city's Kazanskoe cemetery was one site of execution and burial, especially of priests. In 2006, a monument was erected there.

The town was occupied by the German Army from December 4–9, 1941 and damaged during the brief occupation and Soviet offensive in the region.

== Geography ==
The city is situated on the Bystraya Sosna River, which is a tributary of the Don.

=== Climate ===
Climate data for Yelets (1991–2020 normals, extremes 1948–present)
Month	Jan	Feb	Mar	Apr	May	Jun	Jul	Aug	Sep	Oct	Nov	Dec	Year
Record high °C (°F)	7.3 (45.1)	9.3 (48.7)	21.6 (70.9)	29.0 (84.2)	36.1 (97.0)	37.8 (100.0)	38.7 (101.7)	41.1 (106.0)	34.8 (94.6)	25.0 (77.0)	18.1 (64.6)	11.2 (52.2)	41.1 (106.0)
Mean daily maximum °C (°F)	−3.8 (25.2)	−3.1 (26.4)	2.9 (37.2)	13.8 (56.8)	21.4 (70.5)	24.6 (76.3)	26.7 (80.1)	25.8 (78.4)	19.2 (66.6)	10.9 (51.6)	2.4 (36.3)	−2.3 (27.9)	11.5 (52.7)
Daily mean °C (°F)	−6.6 (20.1)	−6.4 (20.5)	−1.2 (29.8)	7.8 (46.0)	14.9 (58.8)	18.4 (65.1)	20.5 (68.9)	19.0 (66.2)	13.2 (55.8)	6.7 (44.1)	−0.3 (31.5)	−4.8 (23.4)	6.8 (44.2)
Mean daily minimum °C (°F)	−9.2 (15.4)	−9.3 (15.3)	−4.4 (24.1)	2.9 (37.2)	9.0 (48.2)	12.8 (55.0)	14.8 (58.6)	13.2 (55.8)	8.5 (47.3)	3.4 (38.1)	−2.5 (27.5)	−7.3 (18.9)	2.7 (36.9)
Record low °C (°F)	−36.6 (−33.9)	−37.8 (−36.0)	−32.2 (−26.0)	−16.1 (3.0)	−3.8 (25.2)	0.0 (32.0)	2.3 (36.1)	1.8 (35.2)	−6.1 (21.0)	−12.8 (9.0)	−25.9 (−14.6)	−35.0 (−31.0)	−37.8 (−36.0)
Average precipitation mm (inches)	43 (1.7)	38 (1.5)	32 (1.3)	36 (1.4)	47 (1.9)	62 (2.4)	68 (2.7)	55 (2.2)	45 (1.8)	53 (2.1)	38 (1.5)	39 (1.5)	556 (21.9)
Average extreme snow depth cm (inches)	16 (6.3)	24 (9.4)	18 (7.1)	1 (0.4)	0 (0)	0 (0)	0 (0)	0 (0)	0 (0)	0 (0)	2 (0.8)	9 (3.5)	70 (28)
Average rainy days	7	6	7	13	14	16	15	11	13	14	12	8	136
Average snowy days	24	21	14	4	1	0	0	0	0.2	3	13	22	102
Average relative humidity (%)	84	82	79	68	61	68	70	69	75	81	86	85	76
Source: Погода и Климат

== Administrative and municipal status ==
Within the framework of administrative divisions, Yelets serves as the administrative center of Yeletsky District, even though it is not a part of it. As an administrative division, it is incorporated as Yelets City Under Oblast Jurisdiction—an administrative unit with a status equal to that of the districts. As a municipal division, Yelets City Under Oblast Jurisdiction is incorporated as Yelets Urban Okrug.

== Economy and transportation ==
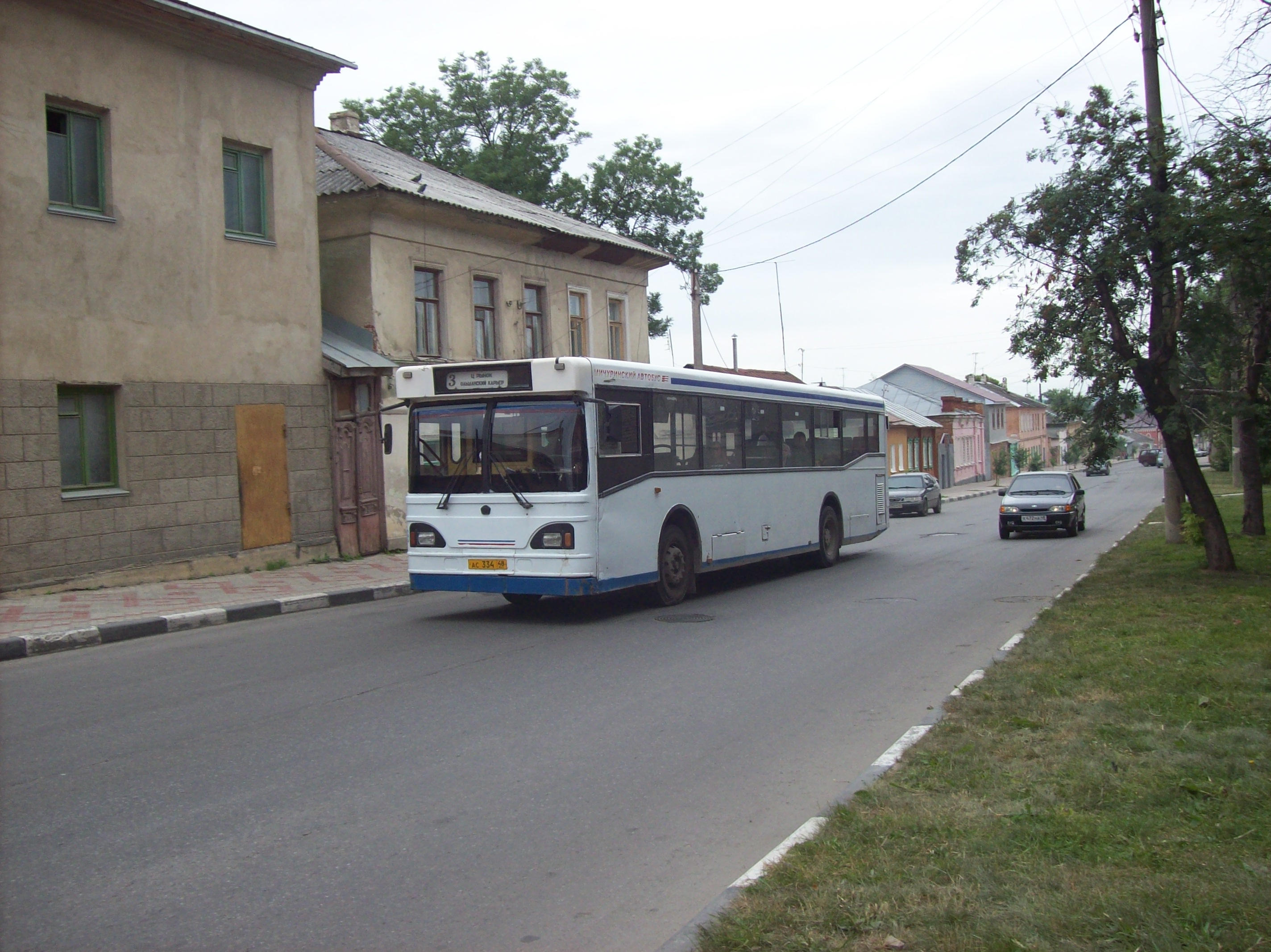
MARZ bus

The city is connected to Moscow, Lipetsk, Oryol, and Rostov by rail and the M4 highway runs past it.

The main industries are limestone quarrying, engineering, food processing, textiles and clothing (Yelets Lace), tobacco processing, and beer distilling.

== Culture and education ==
The city has a theatre, cinemas, and several sports venues.

The Yelets State University was upgraded from an institute in 2000 and the city has eight secondary schools.

== Notable people ==
- Iulia Dombrovskaia, pediatrician
- Tikhon Khrennikov, composer and administrator
