= Livny =

Town in Oryol Oblast, Russia

Livny Ливны
- Town
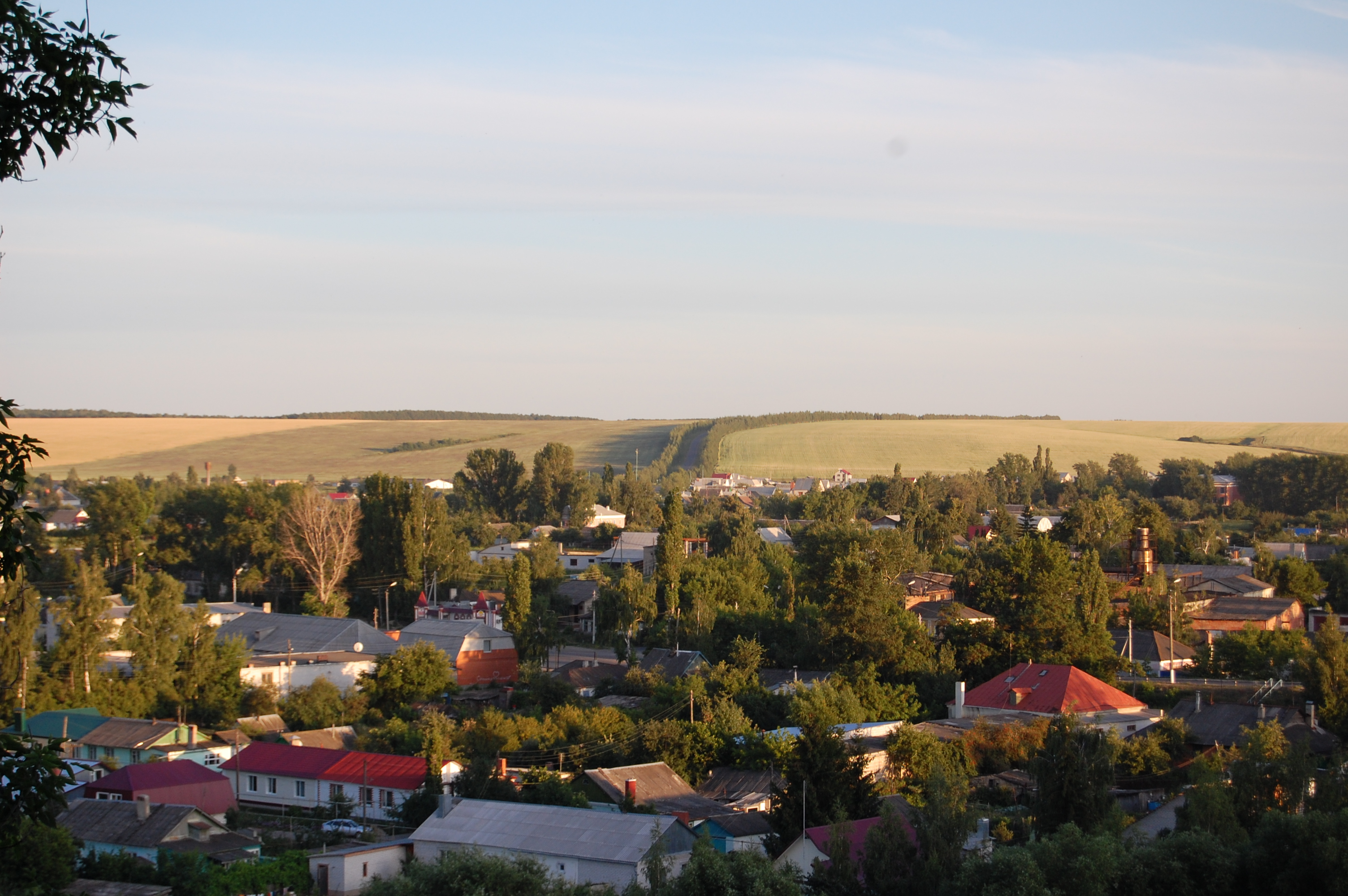
- View of the part of Livny located across the Sosna River

- Flag Coat of arms
- Interactive map of Livny
- Location of Livny Livny (Oryol Oblast)
- Coordinates: 52°25′26″N 37°35′59″E
- Country: Russia
- Federal subject: Oryol Oblast
- Founded: 1586
- Elevation: 150 m (490 ft)

Population (2010 Census)
  - Total: 50,343
  - Estimate (2025): 42,256 (−16.1%)
  - Rank: 317th in 2010

Administrative status
  - Subordinated to: Livensky District
  - Capital of: town of oblast significance of Livny

Municipal status
  - Urban okrug: Livny Urban Okrug
  - Capital of: Livny Urban Okrug, Livensky Municipal District
- Time zone: UTC+3 (MSK)
- Postal code: 303850
- OKTMO ID: 54705000001

Livny (Russian: Ливны, IPA: [ˈlʲivnɨ]) is a town in Oryol Oblast, Russia. As of 2018, it had a population of 47,221.

== History ==
The town is believed to have originated in 1586 as Ust-Livny, a wooden fort on the bank of the Livenka River, although some believe that a town had existed on the spot previous to the Mongol invasion of Rus'. The fortress was important in guarding the southern border of the Grand Duchy of Moscow in the case of a Crimean Tatar raid along the Muravsky Trail.

Thirty years later, Ivan the Terrible sent prince Masalsky to build a town of Livny under the umbrella of a garrison stationed in the fort. It was pillaged and burnt by the Tatars on many occasions. In 1606, the citizens of Livny raised a rebellion against Boris Godunov, killing his governor and proclaiming their allegiance to False Dmitry I. Two years later, Ivan Bolotnikov chose it as a base of his military operations against Vasily IV.

In 1618, the wooden town was burnt by the Cossacks of Petro Konashevych. The Crimeans again attacked the town in 1661, burning it to the ground. As soon as the Tatar attacks ceased, the period of prosperity was ushered. In the 19th century, Livny rivaled Yelets as the main trade center of the area.

During World War II, Livny was occupied by the German Army from 26 November to 25 December 1941. Germany retook Livny (Lauen), briefly in 1942–1943.

== Administrative and municipal status ==
Within the framework of administrative divisions, Livny serves as the administrative center of Livensky District, even though it is not a part of it. As an administrative division, it is incorporated separately as the town of oblast significance of Livny—an administrative unit with the status equal to that of the districts. As a municipal division, the town of oblast significance of Livny is incorporated as Livny Urban Okrug.

== Miscellaneous ==
Near Livny, there is a 350-meter (1,150 ft) tall guyed TV tower, which was presumably built in 1979.

== Notable people ==
Sergey Bulgakov, Orthodox theologian and philosopher, was a native of Livny.

Alexey Stakhanov, founder of the Stakhanovite movement, was born in a village near Livny.

== See also ==
- Adamov's mill
