= Classical kemençe =

Musical instrument

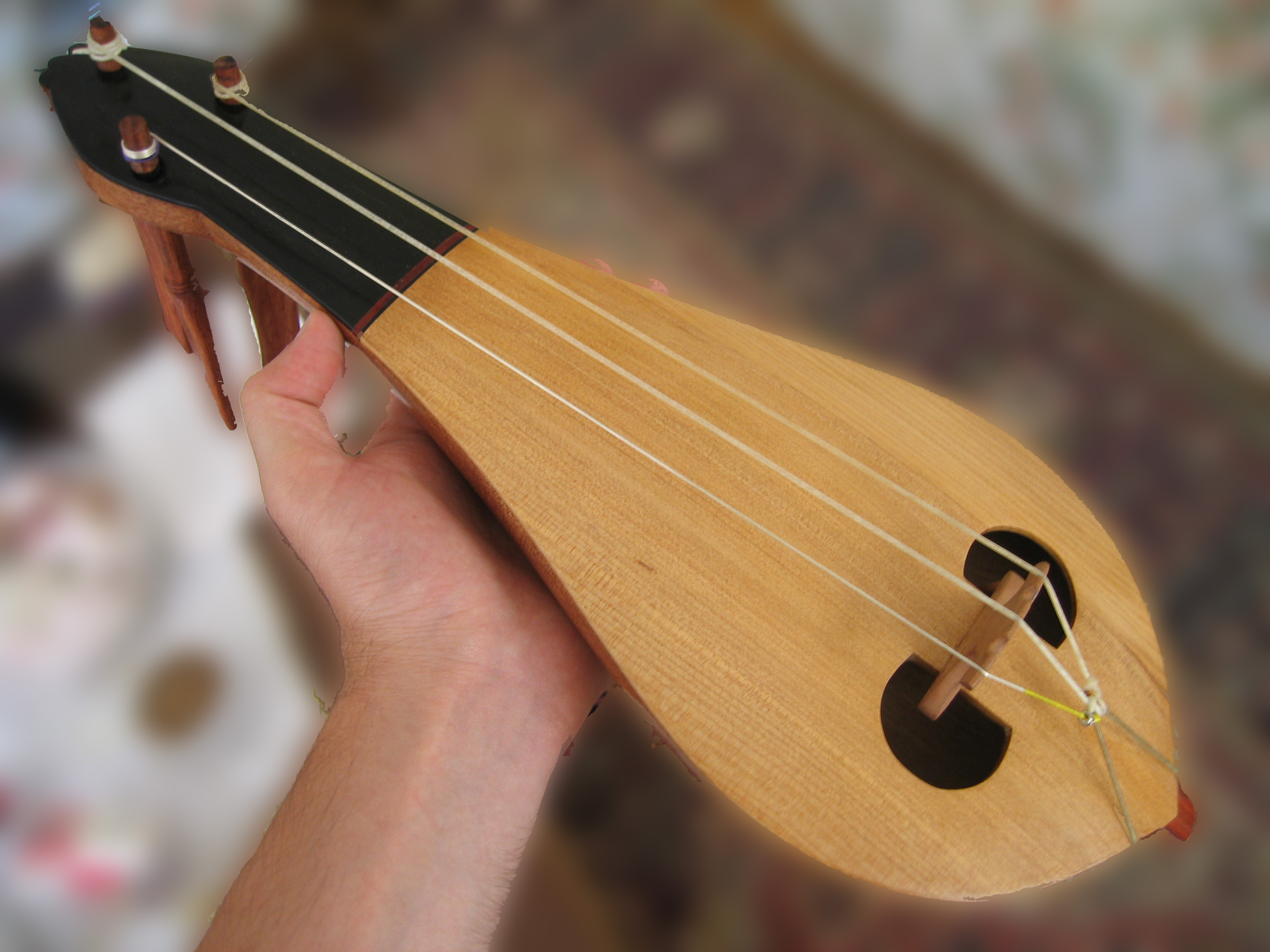

String instrument
- Classification: stringed
- Hornbostel–Sachs classification: 321.321 (Necked bowl lute)

Related instruments
- Byzantine lyra, Gadulka, Calabrian Lira, Cretan lyra, Lijerica

The classical kemenche (Turkish: Klasik kemençe), Armudî kemençe ('pear-shaped kemenche') or Politiki lyra (Greek: πολίτικη λύρα, 'Constantinopolitan lyre', similarly Turkish: İstanbul kemençesi, lit. 'Kemenche of Istanbul') is a pear-shaped bowed instrument with three strings that derives from the medieval Greek Byzantine lyre.

It was mainly used by Greek immigrants from Asia Minor and in classical Ottoman music. The instrument was also used earlier for popular music, such as early "Smyrna-Style" rebetiko and continues to be played in the present day. It has become the main bowed instrument of Ottoman classical music since the mid 19th century.

== Etymology ==
The name kemençe derives from the Persian Kamancheh, and means merely "small bow".

The name lyra derives from the name of the ancient Greek lyre and was used in medieval times, see Byzantine lyra.

== Playing ==
External videos
- Neva Özgen demonstrates the kemençe

It is played in the downright position, by resting it between both knees or on one knee when sitting. It is always played "braccio", that is, with the tuning head uppermost. The instrument's bow is called either yay (in Turkish) or doksar (Greek: δοξάρι) in Greek.

The strings are stopped by touching them by the side with the nails, like for many folk fiddles from Southeastern Europe to the Indian sub-continent, including the Indian sarangi.

== Construction ==
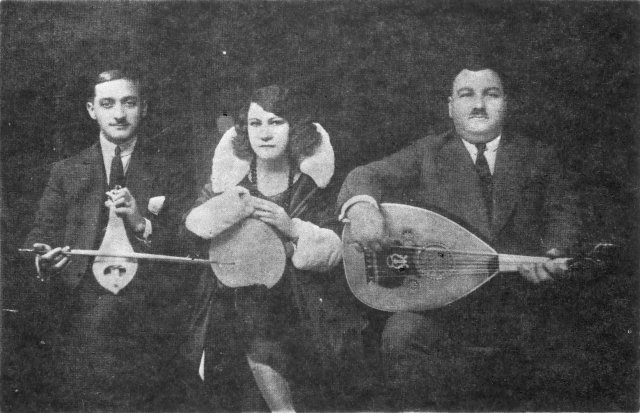
Smyrna style trio: K. Lambros, R. Eskenazi, A. Tomboulis (Athens, 1930)

Its pear-shaped body, elliptical pegbox and neck are fashioned from a single piece of wood. Its sound-board has two D-shaped soundholes of some 4x3 cm, approximately 25 mm apart, the rounded side facing outwards. The bridge is placed between, one side resting on the face of the instrument and the other on the sound post. A small hole 3–4 mm in diameter is bored in the back, directly below the bridge, and a 'back channel' ('sırt oluğu') begins from a triangular raised area ('mihrap') which is an extension of the neck, widens in the middle, and ends in a point near the tailpiece ("kuyruk takozu") to which the gut or metal strings are attached. There is no nut to equalize the vibrating lengths of the strings.

The pegs, which are 14–15 cm long, form a triangle on the head, the middle string being 37–40 mm longer than the strings to either side of it. The vibrating lengths of the short strings are 25.5–26 cm. All the strings are of gut but the yegâh string is silver-wound. Today players may use synthetic racquet strings, aluminium-wound gut, synthetic silk or chromed steel violin strings.

Formerly the head, neck and back channel might be inlaid with ivory, mother-of-pearl or tortoise shell. Some kemençes made for the palace or mansions by great makers such as Büyük İzmitli or Baron had their backs and even the edges of the sound holes completely covered with such inlays with engraved and inlaid motifs.

== Related instruments ==
The Byzantine lyra (Latin: lira) was a pear-shaped bowed string instrument. The Persian geographer Ibn Khurradadhbih (d. 911) was the first to describe the Byzantine lyra as a typical Byzantine instrument (Margaret J. Kartomi, 1990).

Variations of the instrument (sharing the same form and method of playing) exist through a vast area of the Mediterranean and the Balkans. Examples are the Bulgarian Gadulka, the Calabrian Lira in Italy, the lyra of Crete and the Dodecanese, the Lijerica of the Croatian Adriatic.

== Notable kemençe and lyra virtuosi ==
- Fahire Fersan (1900–1997)
- Tamburi Cemil Bey (1873–1916)
- Derya Türkan
- Sokratis Sinopoulos
- Labros Leontaridis
- İhsan Özgen
- Cüneyd Orhon
- Ruşen Ferit Kam

== See also ==
- Byzantine lyra
- Cretan lyra
- Gadulka
- Gudok
- Ghaychak
- Gusle
- Rebab
- Kamancheh
- Kobyz
- Rebec
- Igil
- Byzaanchy
- Huqin
- Violin family

== Bibliography ==
- Margaret J. Kartomi: On Concepts and Classifications of Musical Instruments. Chicago Studies in Ethnomusicology, University of Chicago Press, 1990.
- The New Grove Dictionary of Musical Instruments: Londra, 1984.
- M. Nazmi Özalp: Türk Sanat Mûsikîsi Sazlarından Kemençe, Ankara, tarihsiz (1985'ten önce).
- Laurence Picken: Folk Musical Instruments of Turkey, Londra, 1975.
- Rauf Yekta: Türk Musikisi (çev: Orhan Nasuhioğlu), İstanbul, 1986.
