= Kobyz =

Turkic bowed string instrument

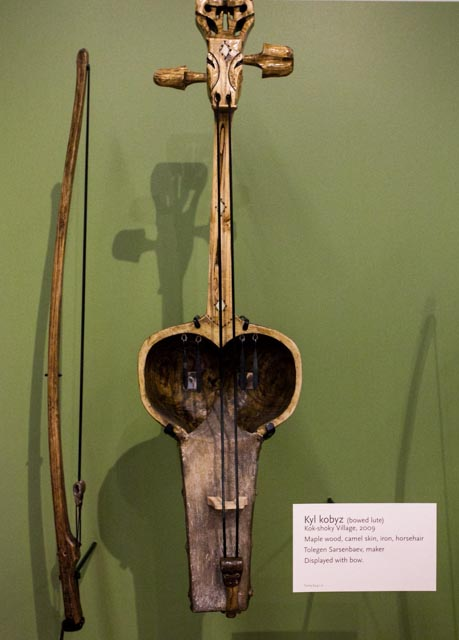
- Classification: Bowed string instrument

Related instruments
- Byzantine lira; Byzaanchy; Calabrian Lira; Cretan lira; Gadulka; Gusle; Gudok; Igil; Morin Khuur; Kamancheh; Kemenche; Rebec; Rebab

Art of crafting and playing Kobyz
- UNESCO Intangible Cultural Heritage
- Country: Uzbekistan
- Reference: 02329
- Region: Asia and the Pacific

Inscription history
- Inscription: 2025 (20th session)
- List: Need of Urgent Safeguarding

The kobyz or qobyz, (Note: Kazakh: қобыз, romanized: qobyz; Bashkir: ҡумыҙ, romanized: qumıź; Tatar: кубыз, romanized: qubız) also known as the kylkobyz, (Note: Kazakh: қылқобыз, romanized: qylqobyz; Bashkir: ҡыл ҡумыҙ, romanized: qıl qumıź; Tatar: кылкубыз, romanized: qılqubız) is an ancient Turkic bowed string instrument, spread among Kazakhs, Karakalpaks, Bashkirs, and Tatars. The Kyrgyz variant is called the kyl-kyiak).

In organological terms, the traditional Kazakh qyl-qobyz is a two-stringed, fretless bowed lute whose strings are made from horsehair. Ethnomusicologist Saule Utegalieva describes it as one of the two prominent traditional lutes of the Kazakhs, alongside the plucked dombra, while noting that the kobyz historically occupied a more restricted and sacred sphere of performance. The instrument has also been examined as a bearer of historical, social and musical memory in modern Kazakhstan, where performers have interpreted it in different ways as part of discussions of Kazakh identity.

The kobyz has two strings made of horsehair. The resonating cavity is usually covered with goat leather. Materials and dimensions vary among regional and historical examples. A detailed study of Kazakh instruments describes the traditional body as being carved from a single block of wood, commonly walnut or birch, with a fretless neck and an open soundbox whose lower portion is covered by an animal-skin membrane. In the instruments documented in that study, the two strings each consist of dozens of woven horsehairs and are suspended far enough from the neck that they are not normally stopped against a fingerboard. Changes in finger pressure and bow weight allow the player to produce ornaments, harmonics and contrasting timbres.

Traditionally kobyzes were sacred instruments, owned by shamans and baksıs (traditional spiritual medics). According to legends, the kobyz and its music could banish evil spirits, sickness and death. In Kazakh tradition, the creation of the instrument is associated with Korkyt Ata, a legendary figure who is said to have made and played the kobyz while searching for a way to overcome death. This account is a cultural origin legend rather than a documented date for the invention of the instrument. In ritual practice, the kobyz could also be fitted with objects such as metal pendants or a mirror inside the soundbox, giving these instruments symbolic as well as musical functions.

== Construction and playing technique ==
Traditional instruments are generally carved with the neck and bowl-shaped body forming a single wooden piece. Only the lower part of the resonating cavity is covered with skin, while the upper part remains open. The absence of frets and the distance between the strings and neck distinguish the playing technique from that of many other bowed lutes. The player holds the kobyz vertically and produces pitches through contact with the strings rather than by pressing them firmly against a fingerboard.

The bow is also traditionally strung with horsehair. Variations in the pressure and angle of the bow can emphasize the instrument's dense lower register or bring out higher harmonics. Historical instruments sometimes incorporated pendants, small metal plates or other attachments that sounded when the instrument moved, adding an idiophonic element to the bowed sound. Modern makers and musicians use both reconstructed traditional forms and altered concert instruments, depending on repertoire and performance setting.

== Repertoire and cultural role ==
Two historically important strands of Kazakh kobyz performance are associated with the baksy and the zhyrau. Ritual musicians performed personal melodies known as saryn, often constructed from recurring musical phrases. Epic performers used the instrument in narrative works connected with oral poetry. Parts of both traditions subsequently entered the secular kobyz repertoire.

The surviving repertoire includes küi, relatively short instrumental compositions that convey a narrative, image or emotional state. Repetition is an important structural feature, and some pieces imitate or suggest sounds such as bird calls, animals and galloping horses. Because the repertoire was transmitted orally, a composition may exist in several versions, with performers balancing inherited musical material and individual interpretation.

Academic studies have also treated the qyl-qobyz as more than an archaeological survival. Megan Rancier argues that the instrument can be understood as a type of cultural archive whose construction, repertoire, associations and performance practices preserve different layers of Kazakh history and social memory. Its modern meanings therefore include ritual history, concert performance, cultural revival and representation of national identity.

== In Kazakh music ==
In the 1930s, when the first folk instrument orchestras were established in the Soviet republic of Kazakhstan, a new kind of kobyz came into existence. It now had four metallic strings and thus became closer to a violin. Such a modernized kobyz can be used to play both Kazakh music and the most complicated works of violin literature. One of the few western musicians to use the kobyz is Trefor Goronwy.

The concert instrument is often distinguished from the traditional two-stringed qyl-qobyz. The modernization of the kobyz formed part of a wider effort to adapt traditional instruments for Soviet-style folk orchestras, expanding their range and standardizing their construction. At the same time, the traditional instrument's close association with healers and shamanic practice contributed to a decline in its use during parts of the Soviet period. According to Utegalieva, a revival of the older qyl-qobyz tradition became more visible from the 1960s and 1970s onward.

The nineteenth- and early twentieth-century musician Ykylas Dukenuly is an important figure in the secular kobyz tradition. Works attributed to or arranged by him include narrative and descriptive küi such as Qambar batyr, Qazan, Zhalgyz ajaq and Shynyrau. His repertoire contributed to the instrument's development outside its earlier ritual context and was passed to later generations of performers through pupils and oral transmission.

While many Kazakh kobyz players and scholars theorize that bards accompanied themselves on the kobyz during recitation of epics, today a mainstay of the Kazakh kobyz repertoire is küi, which are short programmatic pieces composed as instrumental narration or expression of emotion, often employing the purposeful imitation of sounds such as bird calls or horse hooves.

The instrument continues to be used by performers working in traditional, orchestral and contemporary settings. These different approaches have sometimes emphasized contrasting aspects of the kobyz: its association with spirituality and oral tradition, its technical possibilities as a concert instrument, and its status as a symbol of Kazakh cultural memory.

== In Karakalpak music ==
The kobyz is still played today by jyrau (one of the two types of Karakalpak bard), as accompaniment during recitation of epics and dastan. The kobyz punctuates spoken narrative, plays the melodic line in unison with the voice during the sung parts, supports sustained notes in the voice by repeatedly bowing the same note, and plays the melody when the jyrau is not singing.

The jyrau sings with a guttural, raspy timbre, in a style common to many nomadic groups of Central Asia, Mongolia, and Southern Siberia. Although this timbre was in the past associated with shamanic practice, living memory of this has died out, and modern jyrau instead interpret the timbre as a vocal imitation of the kobyz itself.

In Karakalpakstan, the instrument is made from local woods such as mulberry or apricot, with a leather-covered body and two horsehair strings. UNESCO describes it as a portable instrument associated with a nomadic way of life and with male zhyrau who perform epic narratives in a distinctive vocal style.

The art is transmitted within families and through master–apprentice teaching, as well as in workshops and formal educational settings. UNESCO identified reduced transmission, declining interest, urbanization, limited training opportunities and insufficient resources as threats to the continuation of the tradition. An eighteen-month safeguarding project carried out from 2023 to 2025 documented instrument-making and zhyrau performance techniques and organized training for younger craftspeople and performers.

In 2025, UNESCO inscribed the Art of crafting and playing Kobyz, as practised in the Republic of Karakalpakstan in Uzbekistan, on the List of Intangible Cultural Heritage in Need of Urgent Safeguarding. The decision emphasized documentation, education, community participation and intergenerational transmission as central parts of the safeguarding programme.

== In Tatar music ==
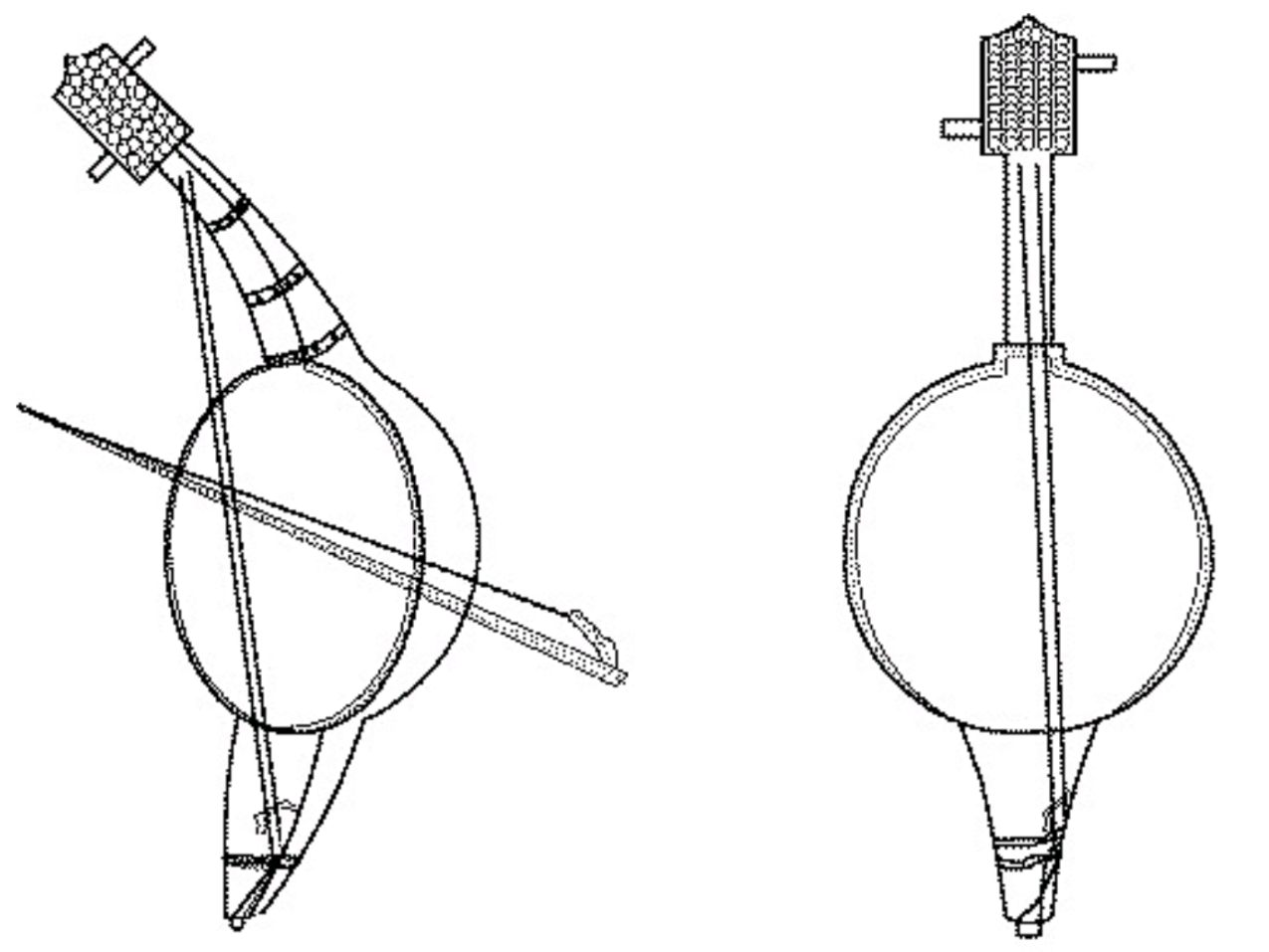
Tatar qylqubız

The art of kobyz flourished before the fall of the Kazan khanate in 1552 among Tatars and some other ethnic groups of Volga region. However, this art was preserved until the end of the 18th century among the Tatar dervishes.

Today the instrument is used in various Tatar ethnic ensembles like Bermenchek etc. and it is studied in depth by a candidate of art history at the Kazan Conservatory Gennady Makarov.

== In Bashkir music ==
The Bashkir qyl-qubız belongs to the same broad family of vertically held bowed instruments. Traditional versions used horsehair for the strings and bow. The instrument declined in ritual and community use over time, but revival efforts began in Bashkortostan during the 1990s. Modern academic forms may use four metal strings and construction features intended for ensemble or concert performance.

== In Kyrgyz music ==
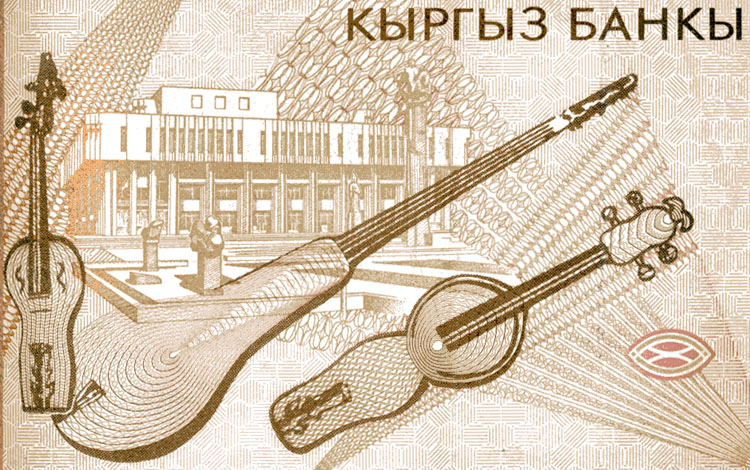
One Kyrgyz som note (reverse side) depicting a kyl kyyak (right)

The kyl kyyak (Kyrgyz: кыл кыяк [qɯl qɯˈjɑq]) (sometimes spelt kyl kiak and sometimes without the 'kyl') is a stringed musical instrument used in Kyrgyz music.

The instrument is carved from a single piece of wood (typically apricot) and typically measures 60–70 cm. It has 2 strings, one to provide melody and the other resonance. The kyl kyyak is played vertically with a bow and can be played on horseback.

The strings and bow are normally made from horse hair and many instruments feature a carved horse's head. This all reflects the importance of the horse in Kyrgyz rural culture.

Museum documentation for a late nineteenth-century Kyrgyz kiyak records wood, leather and horsehair among its materials and describes a narrow body carved from one piece of wood, two strings and a horsehair bow. The instrument is held upright, usually resting on the player's knee, and is used both for instrumental pieces and to accompany singing. As with the Kazakh kobyz, the strings are lightly touched rather than pressed against a fingerboard, allowing the player to emphasize harmonics and changes of tone.

== See also ==
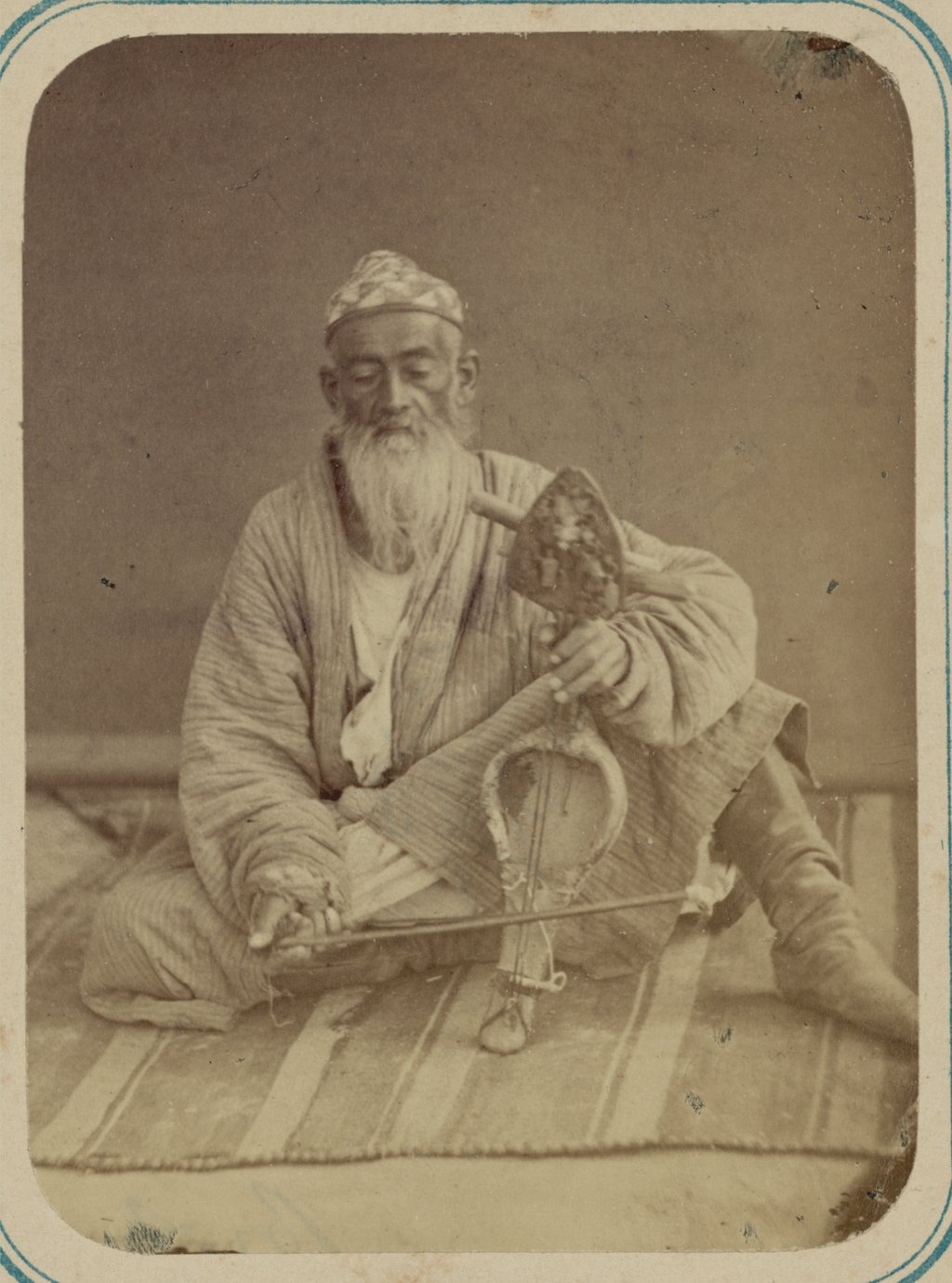
Kobyz player, Turkestan, circa 1865-1872.

- Music of Central Asia
- Bağlama
- Banhu
- Byzantine Lyra, the bowed lyre of the Byzantine Empire
- Chuurqin
- Cobza
- Dutar
- Dombra
- Erhu
- Gadulka
- Gudok
- Gusle
- Kamancheh
- Kemenche
- Komuz
- Lute
- Rebab
- Tovshuur
- The lyra of Crete
