= Rebab =

String instrument

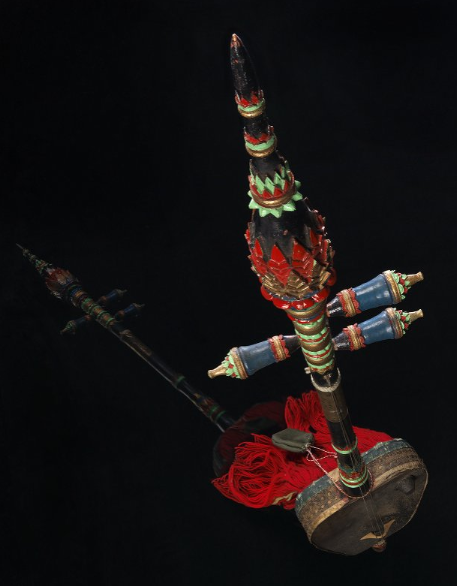
Rebab tiga tali (three-stringed rebab), Western Malaysia c. 1977. St Cecilia's Hall.

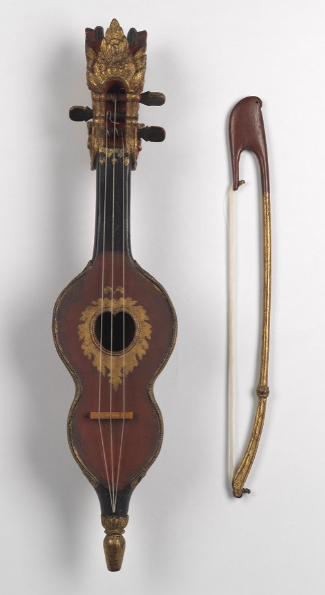
Burmese Tayaw, ca. 1900. St Cecilia's Hall.

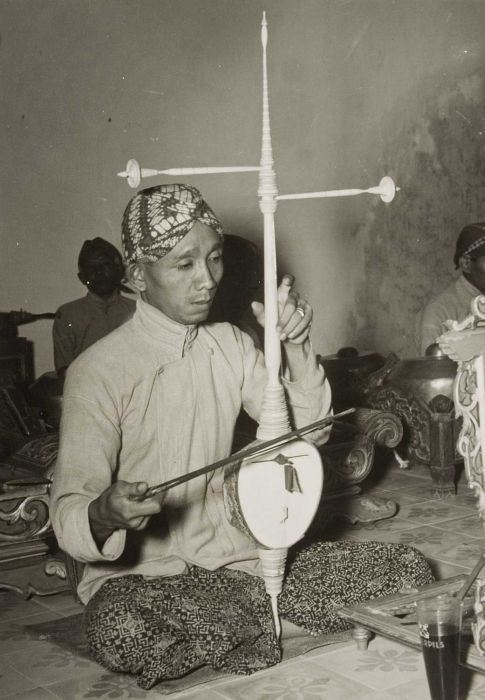
K.P.H. Notoprojo, famous Indonesian Rebab player

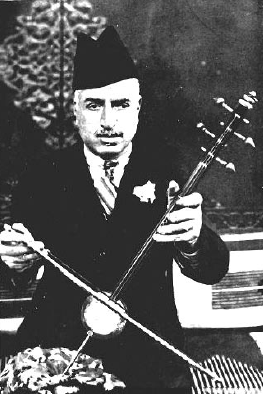
Iraqi jawza (جوزه) player Salih Shemayil at the first Cairo Congress of Arab Music (1932)

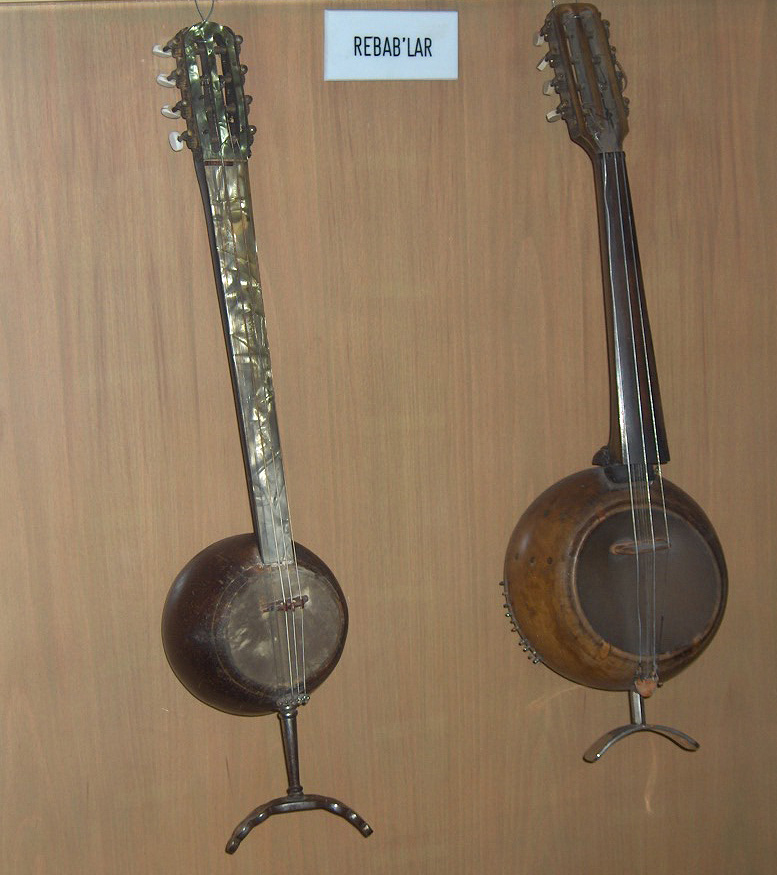
Rebabs, Mevlâna mausoleum, Konya, Turkey

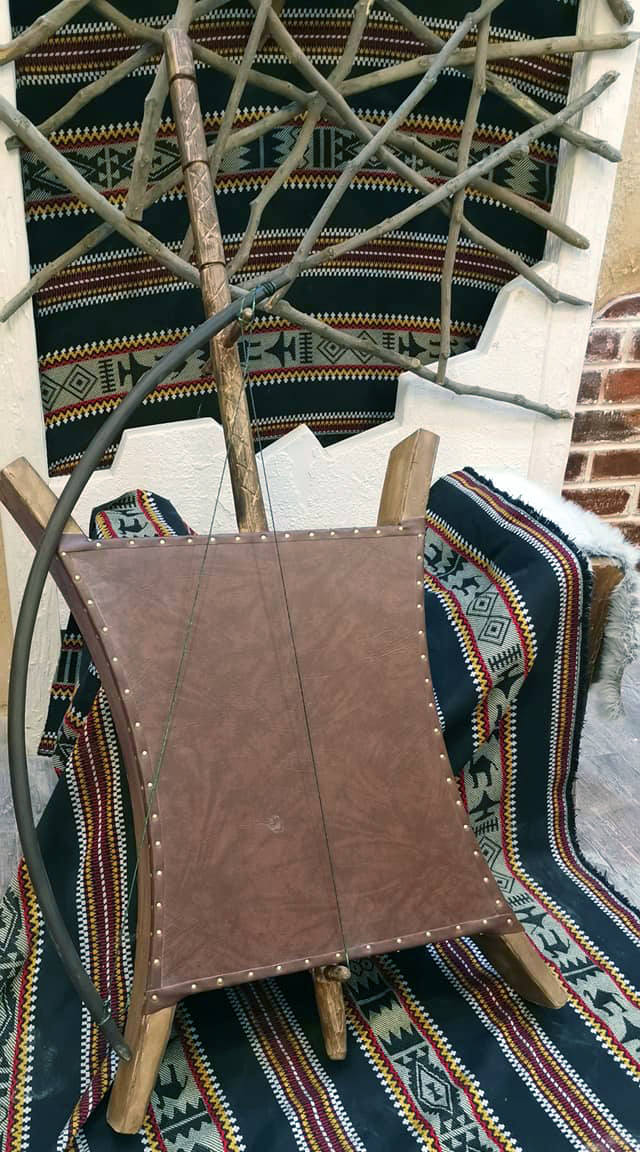
Rebab from Yemen.

Rebab (Arabic: ربابة, rabāba, variously spelled rebap, rubob, rebeb, rababa, rabeba, robab, rubab, rebob, etc) is the name of several related string instruments that independently spread via Islamic trading routes over much of North Africa, West Asia, Central Asia, Southeast Asia, and parts of Europe. The instrument is typically bowed, but is sometimes plucked. It is one of the earliest known bowed instruments, named no later than the 8th century, and is the parent of many bowed and stringed instruments.

== Variants ==
The term rebab has not consistently referred to a single standardized instrument. Historical and regional usage applied related names such as rebab, rabab, rubab and rubob to instruments with differing construction and playing techniques, including both bowed and plucked forms. As the terminology spread across North Africa, West and Central Asia, South Asia and Southeast Asia, local musical traditions adapted the instruments' body shapes, strings, soundboards and performance methods. Consequently, continuity in the name does not necessarily indicate continuity in the instrument's physical design.

There are chiefly three main types:

A long-necked bowed variety that often has a spike at the bottom to rest on the ground (see first image to the right); thus this is called a spike fiddle in certain areas. Some of the instruments developing from this variant have vestigial spikes.

A short-necked double-chested or "boat-shaped" variant; plucked versions like the Maghreb rebab and the kabuli rebab (sometimes referred to as the robab or rubab) also exist.

Besides the spike fiddle variant, a variant with a pear-shaped body, quite similar to the Byzantine lyra and the Cretan lyra, also exists. This latter variant travelled to western Europe in the 11th century, and became the rebec. This rabāb is the ancestor of many European bowed instruments, including the rebec and the lyra, though not of bowed instruments in the lyre family such as the crwth, jouhikko, talharpa and gue.

This article will only concentrate on the spike-fiddle Rebab, which usually consists of a small, usually rounded body, the front of which is covered in a membrane such as parchment or sheepskin and has a long neck attached. It has a long thin neck with a pegbox at the end, and has one, two or three strings. It also lacks a fingerboard. The instrument is held upright, either resting on the lap or on the floor. The bow is usually more curved than that of the violin.

The Rebab, though valued for its voice-like tone, has a very limited range (a little over an octave), and was gradually replaced throughout much of the Arab world by the violin and kemenche. The Iraqi version of the instrument (jawza or joza) has four strings.

== Construction ==
The Rebab is used in a wide variety of musical ensembles and genres, corresponding with its wide distribution, and is built and played somewhat differently in different areas. Following the principle of construction in Iran, Ahvaz, the rebab is a large instrument with a range similar to the viola da gamba, whereas versions of the instrument further west tend to be smaller and higher-pitched. The body varies from being ornately carved, as in Java, to simpler models such as the 2-string Egyptian "fiddle of the Nile." They may have a body made of half a coconut shell, while the more sophisticated versions have a metal soundbox, and the front may be half-covered with beaten copper, and half with cowskin. an endpin is similar to the cello.

== History ==
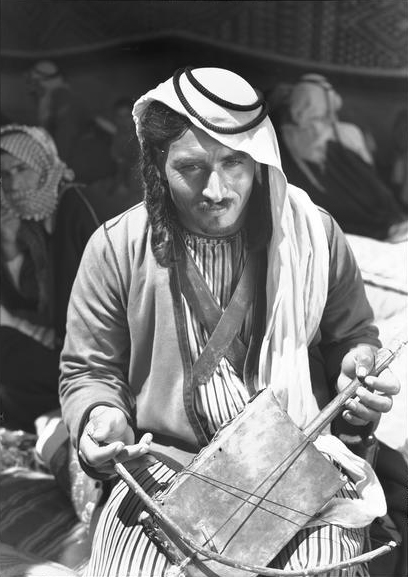
Bedouin playing a rebab during World War II

According to Richard Wallaschek, bowed rebab was developed under Muslim culture. The Rebab was heavily used, and continues to be used, in Arabic Bedouin music and is mentioned by Johann Ludwig Burckhardt in his travelog Travels in Arabia:

"Of instruments they possess only the rababa, (a kind of guitar,) the ney, (a species of clarinet,) and the tambour, or tambourine."

It is called "joza" in Iraq, named after the sound box material made of a coconut shell. There is also a bowed instrument in Persian music named Kamanche which has similar shape and structure. It spread to different regions including South East Asia through Islamic trading routes.

== Southeast Asia ==
In the Indonesian gamelan the rebab is an essential elaborating instrument, ornamenting the basic melody. A two-string bowed lute consisting of a wooden body, traditionally though now rarely a single coconut shell, covered with very fine stretched skin. Two brass strings are tuned a fifth apart and the horse hair bow is tied loosely (unlike modern Western stringed instruments) with the proper tension controlled by the players bow hand, contributing to the difficult technique. There are typically two per ensemble, one for pelog and one for slendro, never played together.

The rebab does not have to conform exactly to the scale of the other gamelan instruments and can be played in relatively free time, finishing its phrases after the beat of the gong ageng (the big gong that "rules" the ensemble, see: colotomy). The rebab also frequently plays the buka when it is part of the ensemble.

In Malaysia, especially the eastern Malaysian states of Kelantan and northern Terengganu (Besut), Rebab is one of important traditional music instruments. Its appearance is significantly different from rebabs from other regions. It has 3 strings, 3 tuning pegs (telinga), a decorative, detachable headstock (kepala), a skin made of cow's stomach and a small, nipple-like mute mechanism (puting). The Rebab is used in the makyong ensemble, tarik selampit and also in a healing ritual called "Main Peteri".

== See also ==
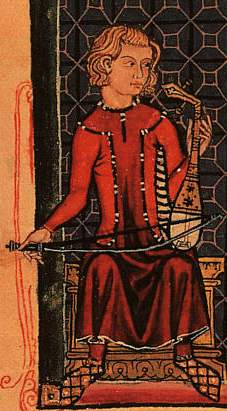
Rebab player

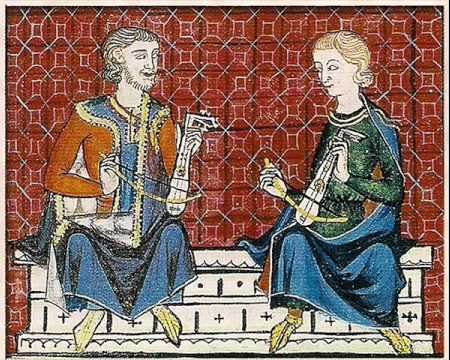
Rebabs.

The Cantigas de Santa Maria, c. 1260, captured some of the musical instruments introduced from Muslim dominated Andalusia to Southern Europe. The plucked and bowed versions existed alongside each other. The bowed instruments became the rebec or rabel and the plucked instruments became the gittern. Curt Sachs linked this instrument with the mandola, the kopuz and the gambus, and named the bowed version rabâb.
- Ektara, one-string instrument used in traditional music from Bangladesh, India, and Pakistan.
- Erhu
- Gadulka
- Gudok
- Gusle
- Kobyz
- Lijerica
- Masenqo
