= Milomir Miljanić =

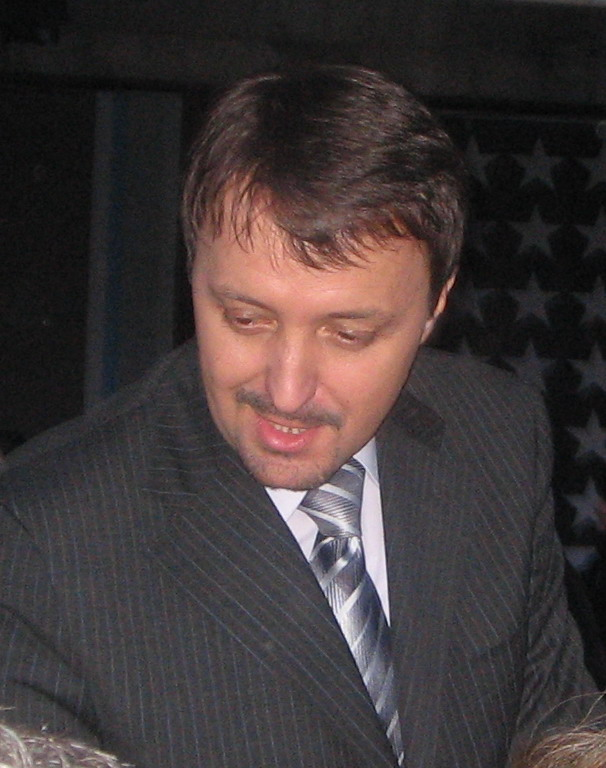
- Miljanić In 2008

Background information
- Born: Milomir Miljanić; 14 June 1963 (age 63); Nikšić, SR Montenegro, SFR Yugoslavia
- Genre: Folk
- Occupations: Singer, poet
- Years active: 1990–present
- Labels: PGP RTS, Jugodisk, Jugoton, Jugovideo, Renome, Astron, BN Music

Milomir Miljanić (Serbian Cyrillic: Миломир Миљанић; born 14 June 1963), nicknamed Miljan (Миљан), is a Serbian folk singer from Montenegro. Initially a guslar (gusle player, bard), he was the 5-time national champion before turning to pop-music in 2005. He is known for his traditional folk songs, which are mainly on patriotic and love themes. His hits include Gledaj, Orle and Izbeglica.

== Musical career ==
=== Epic poetry ===
Miljan began performing Serbian epic poetry on gusle as a young child. At 16 years of age, he released his first album. At 17, he won the Junior Championship in gusle, while as a senior, he won a total of five times.

In 1990 he released his gusle cassette "The Wings of Kosovo", which sold a record-breaking 300 copies a day.

His epic songs are mainly on the breakup of Yugoslavia.

=== Singing ===
In 2005 he left the epic poetry scene and entered the folk music scene with the release of his album Postadosmo dva naroda. He is known for his traditional folk songs, which are mainly on patriotic and love themes.

As of 2012, he has released more than 30 albums.

== Personal life ==
Miljanić is a Serbian nationalist. He lives in Belgrade, where he also holds a production company (Astron). He is married, and has three children.

== Discography ==
- 2005. Постадосмо два народа
- 2007. Избеглица
- 2008. Да се не заборави
- 2010. Идем тамо ђе ме воле
- 2011. Бунтовник

== Sources ==
- "Глас Србије": Миломир Миљан Миљанић - српски гуслар и певач подстрек младим покољењима ["Voice of Serbia": Milomir Miljan Miljanić – Serbian gusle player and singer, an inspiration to younger generations] (in Serbian). 2 May 2012. Archived from the original on 30 May 2015.
- Miša Đurković. "Komentari".
- Jakšic, Zoran. "Ostavio gusle i nije pogrešio" [Left the fiddle and made no mistake]. Svedok (in Serbian). Archived from the original on 4 March 2016.
