= Gudok =

Russian bowed string musical instrument

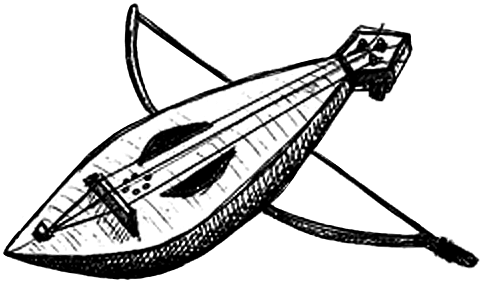
- Impression of the ancient Russian gudok

String instrument
- Hornbostel–Sachs classification: (Bowl lyre sounded by a bow)

Related instruments
- Byzantine lyra; Classical Kemenche, (Turkish: Armudî kemençe, Greek: Πολίτικη Λύρα); Cello; Lira (Calabrian) (Italian: Lira Calabrese); Lira da braccio; Lyra (Cretan) (Greek: Λύρα); Lyre (terminology); Fiddle; Gadulka (Bulgarian: Гъдулка); Rabāb (Arabic الرباب); Lijerica (Serbo-Croatian pronunciation: [lijɛritsa]); violin

The gudok (IPA: [gʊˈdok], Russian: гудок), or gudochek (IPA: [gʊˈdot͡ɕɪk], Russian: гудочек), is a Russian folk string instrument, played with a bow.

The oldest gudoks are dated to the 11th–14th centuries in Novgorod. The instrument is now obsolete and has been reconstructed based on fragments found in excavations.

== Terminology ==
In sources dating to the 11th to 16th centuries, the instrument is referred to as a smyk; it is generally assumed that the gudok, which is mentioned in sources from the 17th century, is the same instrument. In written sources, a player was called a smychek.

== Description ==
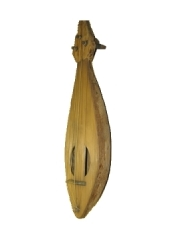
A 12th-century reconstructed gudok, or rebec, based on one found in Novgorod.

A gudok usually had three strings, two of them tuned in unison and played as a drone, the third tuned a fifth higher. All three strings were in the same plane at the bridge, so that a bow could make them all sound simultaneously. Sometimes the gudok also had several sympathetic strings (up to eight) under the sounding board. These made the gudok's sound warm and rich.

The player held the gudok on his lap, like a cello or viola da gamba. It was also possible to play the gudok while standing and even while dancing, which made it popular among skomorokhs. Initially, in the 12th century (and probably before), the gudok did not have a neck for pressing strings. This suggests that it was played by stopping the strings from the side with fingernails (similarly to the Byzantine lyra), rather than pressing strings onto the instrument's neck. Later, in the 14th century, some modifications of the gudok had a real neck for pressing strings.

The Russian gudok ceased to exist as a folk instrument for several centuries. All present instruments are replicas, based on several parts of gudoks found in the Novgorod excavations.

There have been several attempts to revive the gudok in music. Borodin's opera Prince Igor contains a "Gudok Player's Song", which is an artistic reconstruction of how the gudok may have sounded.

== See also ==
- Gadulka, a related Bulgarian instrument

== Sources ==
- "Гудок, музыкальный инструмент" . Brockhaus and Efron Encyclopedic Dictionary (in Russian). 1906.
