= Byzantine lyra =

Medieval string instrument

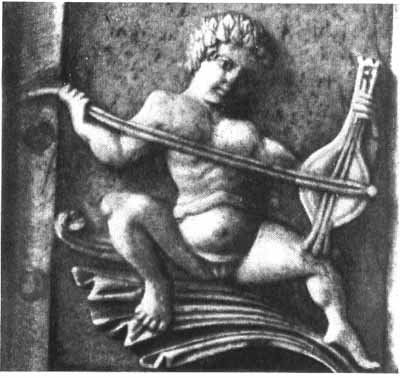
- Oldest known depiction of the Byzantine lyra (c. 900–1100)

String instrument
- Other names: Byzantine lyra, lira, lūrā; Rum Kemençe; medieval fiddle; pear-shaped rebec
- Hornbostel–Sachs classification: 321.321–71 (Necked bowl lute sounded by a bow)
- Developed: 9th century

Related instruments
- Classical lyra (Greek: Πολίτικη Λύρα); Pandura; Kemenche; Cello; Lijerica; Lira (Calabrian) (Italian: Lira Calabrese); Lira da braccio; Lyra (Cretan) (Greek: Λύρα); Lyre (§ Terminology); Fiddle; Gadulka (Bulgarian: Гъдулка); Gusle; Gudok (Russian: гудок; Ukrainian: гудок); Rabāb (Arabic: الرباب); Violin

The Byzantine lyra or lira (Greek: λύρα) was a medieval bowed string instrument from the Byzantine Empire. In its popular form, the lyra was a pear-shaped instrument with three-to-five strings, held upright and played by stopping the strings from the side with the fingertips and fingernails. The oldest known depiction of the instrument is on a Byzantine ivory casket, dated to circa 900–1100; it is preserved in the Museo Nazionale del Bargello in Italy.

Modern variants of the lyra are still played throughout the Balkans and in areas surrounding the Black Sea (and most of the historical territories of the Byzantine Empire), including Greece, Crete (Cretan lyra), Karpathos (Karpathian lyra), Albania, Montenegro, Serbia, Bulgaria (the gadulka), North Macedonia, Croatia (Dalmatian lijerica), Italy (the Calabrian lira), Turkey (the politiki lyra) and Armenia.

== History ==
The most likely origin of the Byzantine lyra is with the long-necked, pear-shaped pandura, a lute-like, plucked stringed instrument; however, with the use of a bow, changes to the size and construction of the instrument was made. The first recorded reference to a bowed lyra is from the 9th century, by Persian geographer Ibn Khurradadhbih (d. 911); in his lexicographical discussion of instruments, he cites the lyra (lūrā) as the 'typical' instrument of the Byzantines, along with the urghun (organ), shilyani (probably a type of harp or lyre) and the salandj (probably a bagpipe). The lyra is widely considered to be the ancestor of many modern European bowed instruments.

The lyra spread widely via Byzantine trade routes between Eurasia and Africa; European writers in the 11th and 12th centuries used the terms 'fiddle' and 'lira' interchangeably when colloquially referring to bowed instruments. The Middle Eastern rabāb was probably inspired by early South Asian lap-fiddles, like the Indo-Nepalese sarangi, before later arriving in Western Europe, likely through continued Arab presence in the Iberian Peninsula. Both instruments spread further throughout the continent, birthing many bowed fiddles across Europe such as the medieval rebec, the Swedish silverbasharpa (and eventual nyckelharpa), and the Scando-Icelandic talharpa, among others. A notable example is the Italian lira da braccio, a 15th-century bowed string instrument that many consider to be the predecessor of the contemporary violin.

== Terminology ==
From the organological point of view, the Byzantine lyra is in fact an instrument belonging to the family of bowed lutes; however, the designation lyra (Greek: λύρα ~ lūrā, English: lyre) constitute of a terminological survival relating to the performing method of an ancient Greek instrument. The use of the term lyra for a bowed instrument was first recorded in the 9th century, probably as an application of the term lyre of the stringed musical instrument of classical antiquity to the new bowed string instrument. The Byzantine lyra is sometimes informally called a medieval fiddle, or a pear-shaped rebec, or a kemanche, terms that may be used today to refer to a general category of similar stringed instruments played with a horsehair bow.

== Characteristics ==
The Byzantine lyra had rear tuning pegs set in a flat peg similarly to the medieval fiddle and unlike the rabāb and rebec. However, the strings were touched by the nails laterally and not pressed from above with the flesh of the finger such as in the violin. The lyra depicted on the Byzantine ivory casket of Museo Nazionale, Florence (900 – 1100 AD) has two strings and pear-shaped body with long and narrow neck. The soundboard is depicted without soundholes and as a distinct and attached piece, however this might be due to stylistic abstraction. The lyras of Novgorod (1190 AD) are closer morphologically to the present bowed lyras (see gallery): they were pear-shaped and 40 cm long; they had semi-circular soundholes and provision for three strings. The middle string served as a drone while fingering the others by finger or fingernail alone, downwards or sidewards against the string, for there was no fingerboard to press them against: a method which gives the notes as clearly as the violin and remains normal in lyras both in Asia as well as on present bowed instruments in post-Byzantine regions such as the Cretan lyra.

== In use today ==
The lyra of the Byzantine Empire survives in many post-Byzantine regions until the present day even closely to its archetype form. Examples are the Politiki lyra (i.e. lyra of the Polis, or City, referring to Constantinople) (Greek: πολίτικη λύρα) also known as the Classical kemence (Turkish: Klasik kemençe or Armudî kemençe) from Constantinople, used in today's Turkey and Greece, the Cretan lyra (Greek: κρητική λύρα) and the one used in the Greek islands of the Dodecanese, the gadulka (Bulgarian: Гъдулка) in Bulgaria, the gusle in Serbia and Montenegro, the Calabrian lira (Italian: lira Calabrese) in Italy, and the Pontic lyra (Greek: ποντιακή λύρα; Turkish: Karadeniz kemençe) in the Pontic Greek communities, that existed (or still exist) around the shores of the Black Sea. The gudok, a historical Russian instrument that survived until the 19th century, is also a variant of the Byzantine lyra.

Similarly to the lyras found at Novgorod, the Cretan lyra, the Gadulka, the Calabrian Lira and the Greek lyras of Karpathos, Macedonia, Thrace and Mount Olympus are manufactured from a single wood block (monoblock), sculpted into a pear-shaped body. The slightly rounded body of the lyra is prolonged by a neck ending on the top in a block which is also pear-shaped or spherical. In that, are set the pegs facing and extending forward. The soundboard is also carved with a shallower arch and has two small semi-circular, D-shaped soundholes. The Cretan lyra is probably the most widely used surviving form of the Byzantine lyra, except that in Crete instrument-making has been influenced by that of the violin. Currently, numerous models tend to integrate the shape of the scroll, the finger board and other morphology of some secondary characteristics of the violin.

The modern variants of the lyra are tuned in various ways: LA–RE–SOL (or a–d–g, i. e. by fifths) on the Cretan lyra; LA–RE–SOL (or a–d–g, where SOL [=g] is a perfect fourth higher than RE [=d] rather than a fifth lower) in Thrace and on Karpathos and the Dodecanese; LA–LA–MI (a–a–e, with the second LA [=a] an octave lower), in Drama; MI–SOL–MI (e–g–e, i. e. a minor third and a major sixth) on the gadulka; LA–RE–LA (a–d–a, a fifth and a fourth) on the Classical Kemenche.

== Gallery ==
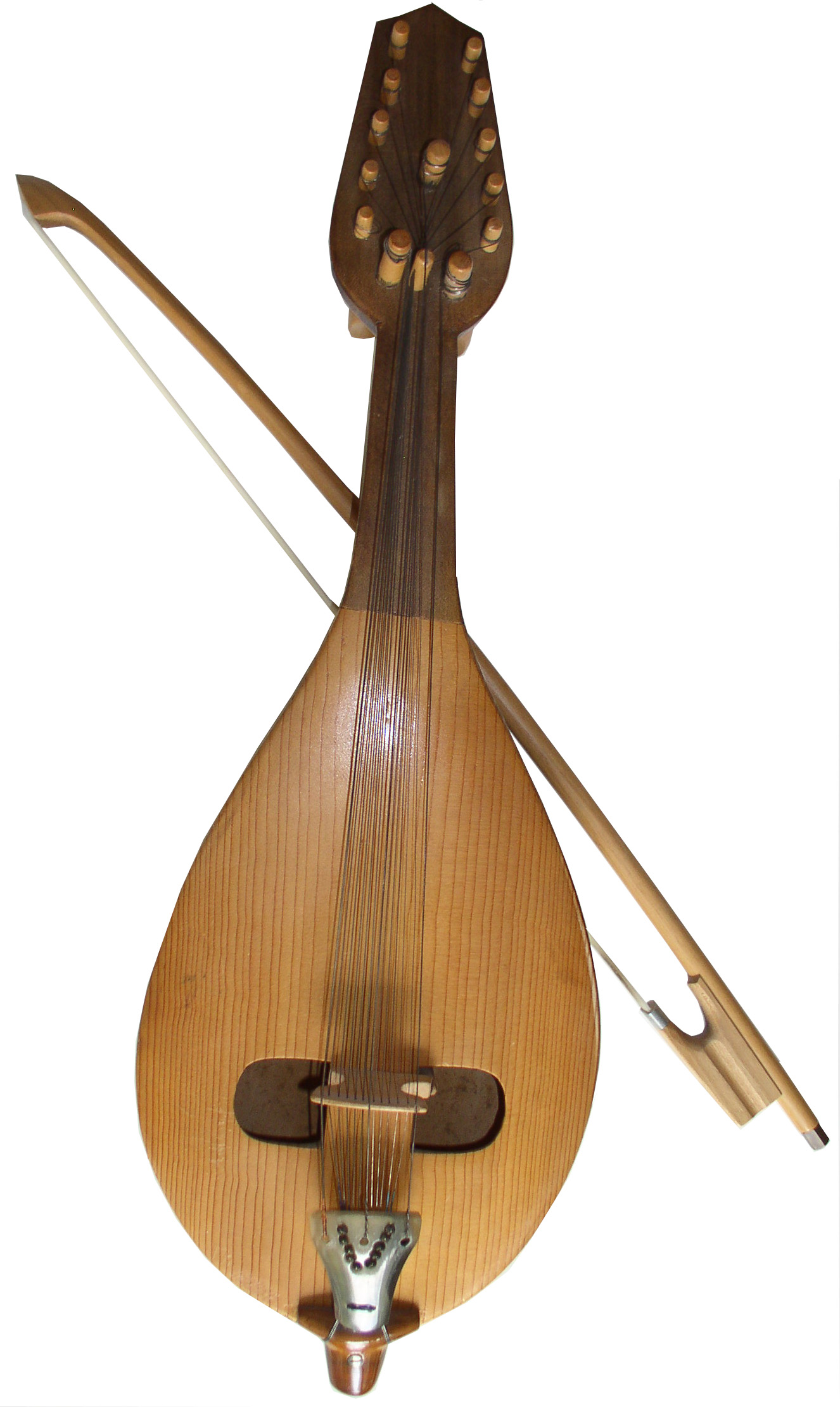
Bulgarian gadulka

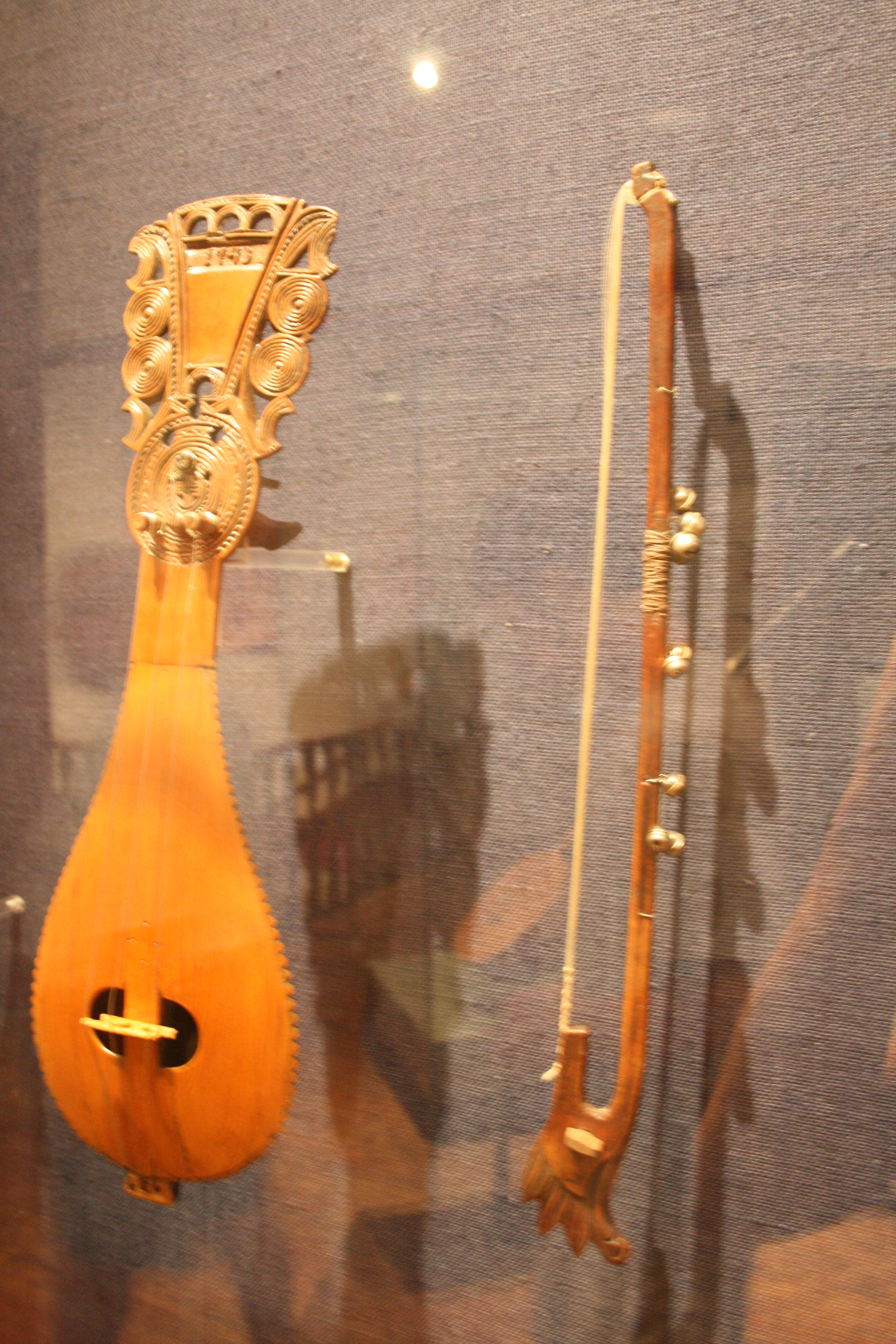
Cretan lyra

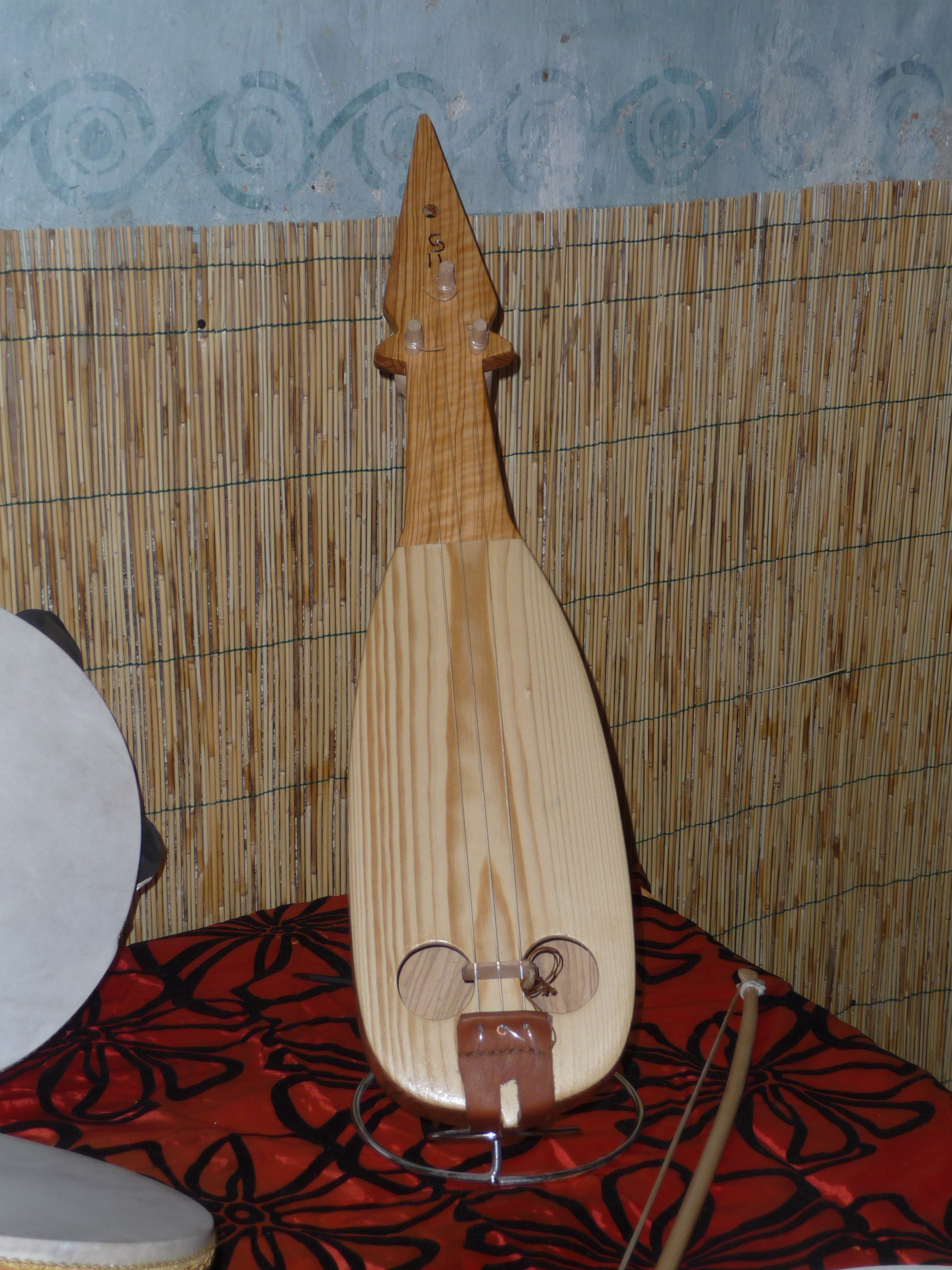
Calabrian lira

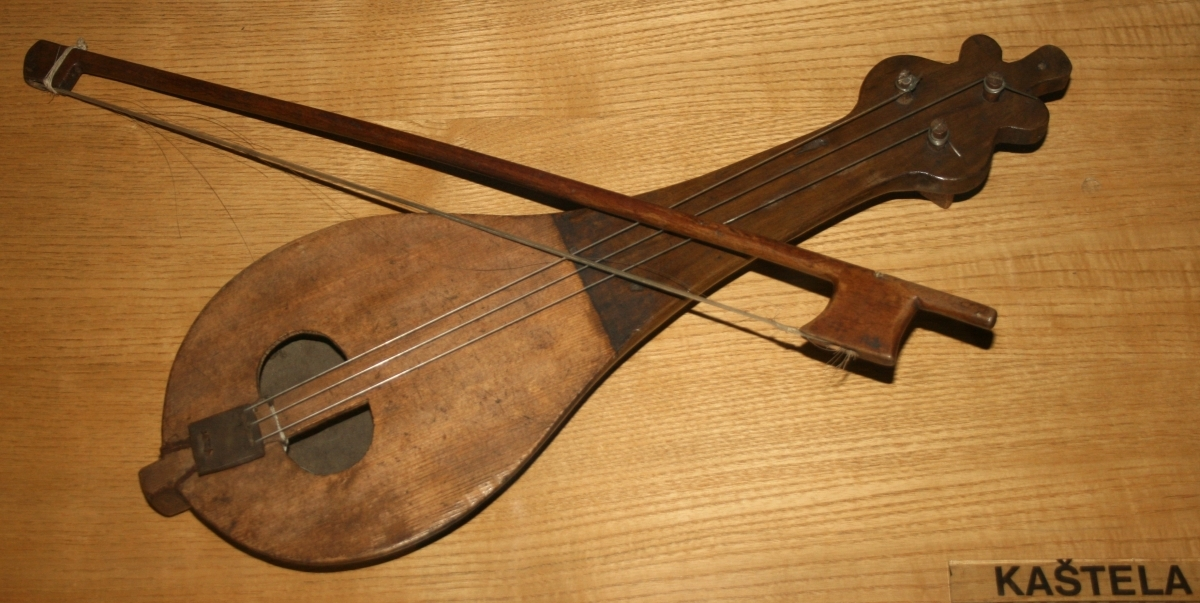
A lijerica from Dalmatia

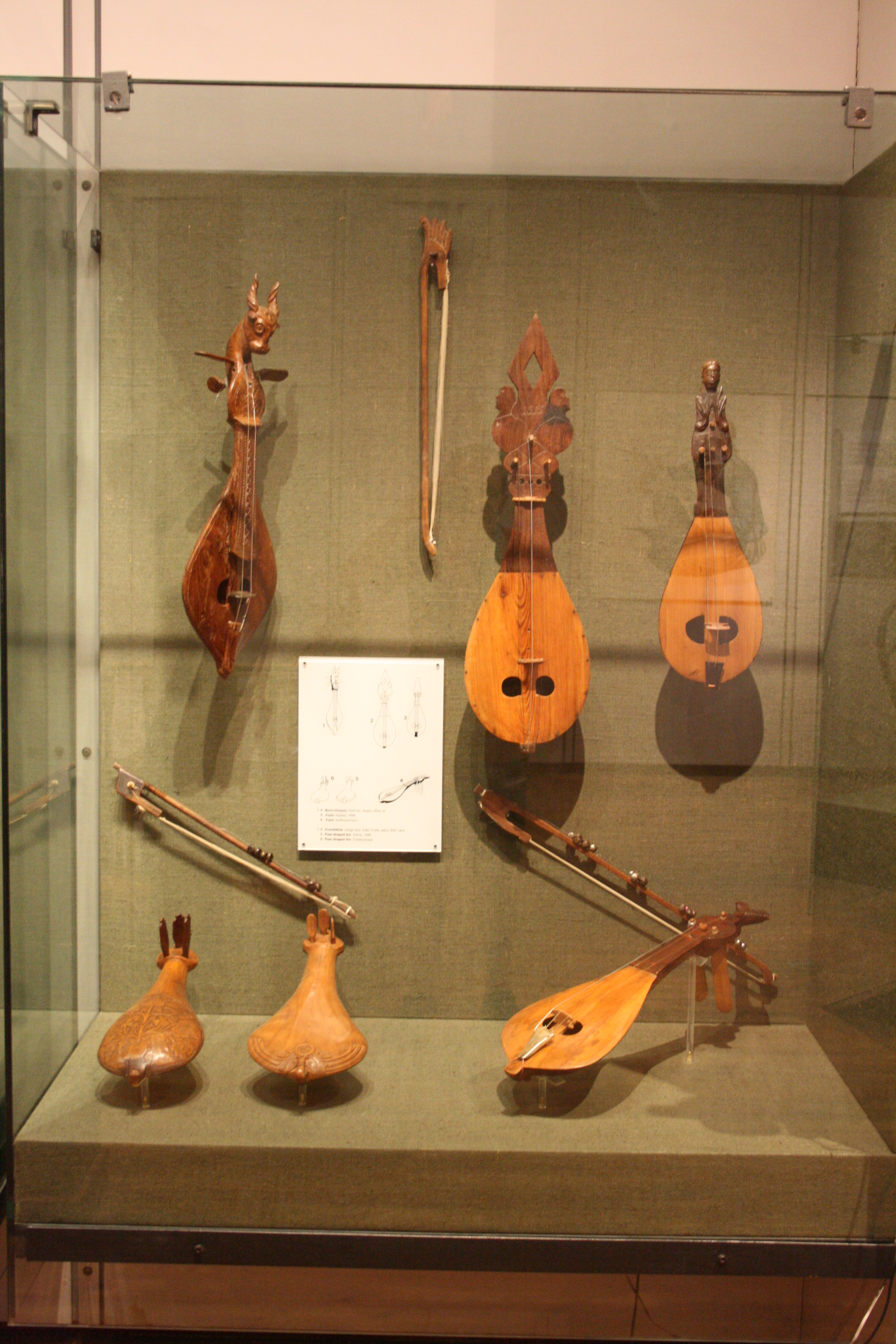
Different types of Cretan lyra in the Museum of Greek Folk Instruments in Athens

== Bibliography ==
- Arkenberg, Rebecca (October 2002), Renaissance Violins, Metropolitan Museum of Art
- Baines, Anthony (November 1992), The Oxford Companion to Musical Instruments, Oxford University Press, ISBN 0-19-311334-1
- Butler, Paul (October 2003), The rebec project, Personal website
- Encyclopædia Britannica (2009), lira, Encyclopædia Britannica Online
- Kartomi, Margaret J. (1990), On Concepts and Classifications of Musical Instruments, University of Chicago Press, ISBN 0-226-42548-7
- Grillet, Laurent (1901), Les ancetres du violon v.1, Paris
