= Calabrian lira =

Musical instrument

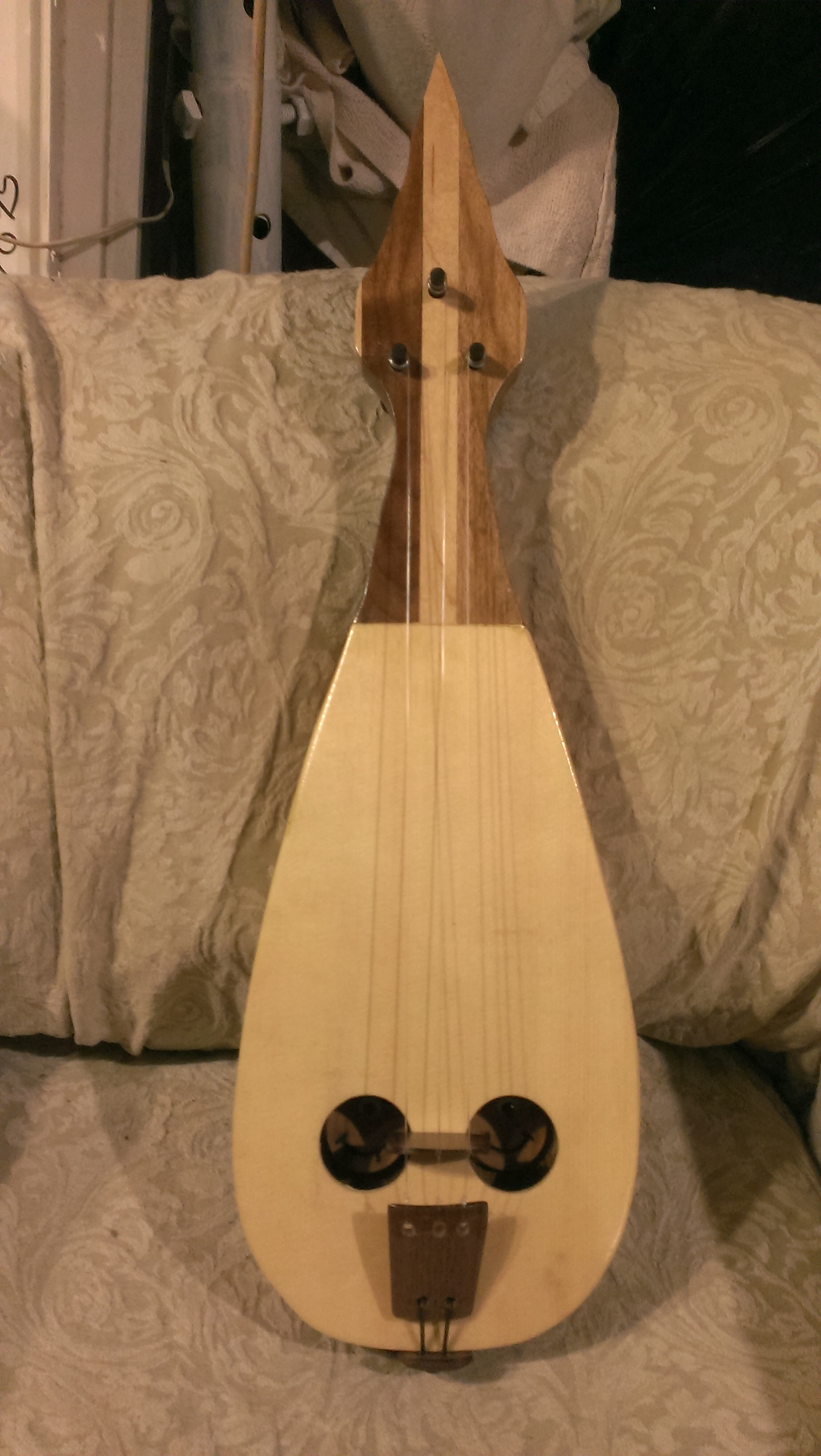

String instrument
- Other names: Lira Calabrese, Lira
- Classification: Necked bowl lutes
- Hornbostel–Sachs classification: 321.321-71 (Necked bowl lute sounded by a bow)

Related instruments
- Byzantine lira, Byzantine Empire (historic); Cretan Lyra, Crete and Dodecanese, Greece; Gadulka, Bulgaria; Armudî kemençe, Istanbul, Turkey (Greek: Πολίτικη Λύρα - Politiki lyra); Lijerica

Calabrian lira

The Calabrian lira (Italian: lira Calabrese) is a traditional musical instrument characteristic of some areas of Calabria, a region in southern Italy.

== Characteristics ==
The lira of Calabria is a bowed string instrument with three strings. Like most bowed lyras, it is played upright, usually supported on the knee, held with the left hand touching the strings with the nails laterally, while the right hand moves the bow. The repertory of the lira includes accompaniment songs (e.g. serenades and songs of anger) and songs suitable for dancing (tarantellas). The repertory of this traditional instrument is known only through records of older players, or people who have known them. On the other hand, in recent years an increased interest around this instrument has led to its use by music groups of traditional music and to the appearance of new manufacturers in different parts of Calabria.

== Origin ==
The Calabrian lira is closely related to the bowed lyra (Greek: λύρα) of the Byzantine Empire. The Persian geographer of the 9th century Ibn Khurradadhbih (died 911) was the first to cite the Byzantine lyra, as a typical bowed instrument of the Byzantines (Margaret J. Kartomi, 1990). Similar bowed instruments descendants of the Byzantine lyra have continued to be played in many post-Byzantine regions until the present day with small changes: the gadulka in Bulgaria, the lyra of Crete and the Dodecanese in Greece, the lyra of Pontos and the classical kemenche (Turkish:Armudî kemençe, Greek:Πολίτικη Λύρα ~ Politiki lira) in Turkey. The Byzantine lyra spread westward to Europe, with uncertain evolution; authors in the 11th and 12th centuries use the words fiddle and lyra interchangeably (Encyclopædia Britannica. 2009).
