= Kemençe of the Black Sea =

Bowed string instrument

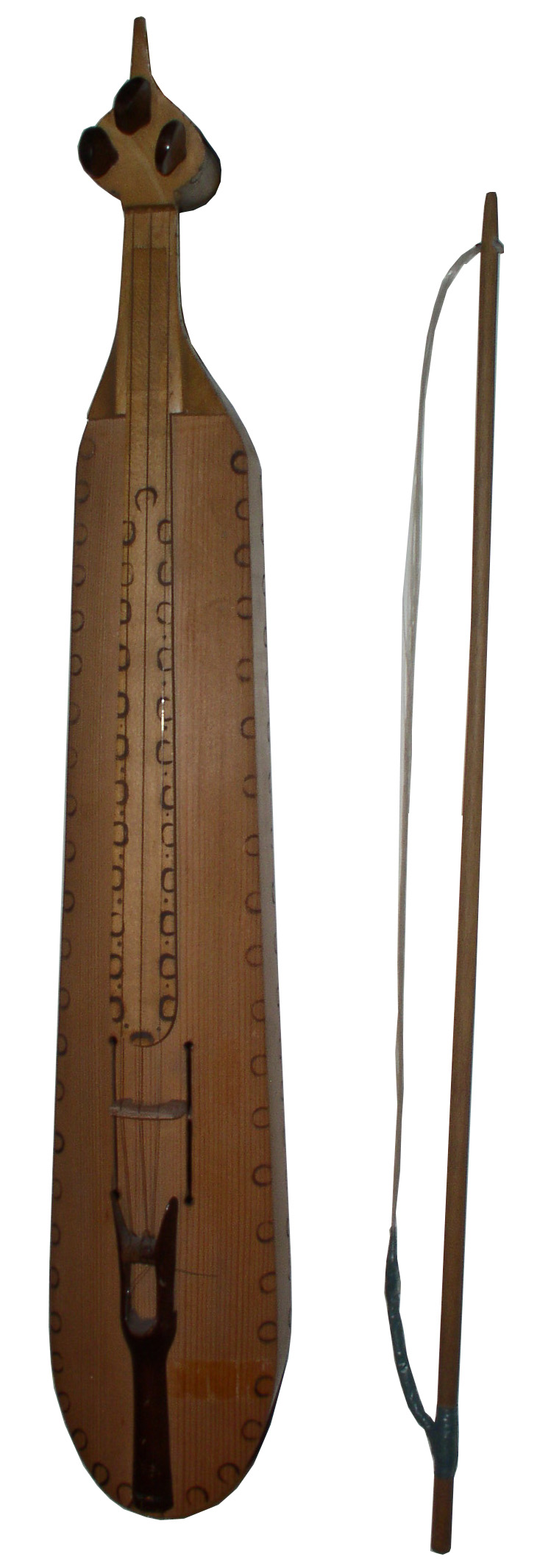

String instrument
- Classification: stringed
- Hornbostel–Sachs classification: 321.322 (Necked box lute)

The Kemençe of the Black Sea or Pontic Lyre (Turkish: Karadeniz kemençesi, Greek: Ποντιακή λύρα Pontiakí lýra, Laz: Çilili (ჭილილი), Armenian: քամանի Qamani, Pontic: lyra) is a traditional musical instrument. It belongs to the category of stringed bowed musical instruments. It has three strings, usually tuned to perfect fourths, usually tuned B-E-A. The instrument is historically and currently played by Turkish and Greek folk artists from Turkey and Greece. The instrument is made of different types of wood.

== Origin and history ==
The earliest stringed instruments were mostly plucked (for example, the Greek lyre). Two-stringed, bowed instruments, played upright and strung and bowed with horsehair, may have originated in the nomadic equestrian cultures of Central Asia, in forms closely resembling the modern-day Mongolian Morin huur and the Kazakh Kobyz. Might be an instrument of Scythians. Also Circassian people of Caucasus region has the same instrument named Shikepshine which basically means horse tail violin. Similar and variant types were probably disseminated along east–west trading routes from Asia into the Middle East, and the Byzantine Empire.

The direct ancestor of all European bowed instruments is the Iranian Kemanche, the Byzantine lyra and later the European rebec. The word ‘kemance’ is derived from the Persian word which means ‘little bow’.

The Pontian lyre seems to have been created between the 11th and 12th centuries, when Pontus was part of the Byzantine Empire, while the name "Kemenche" first appeared in the 10th century. According to Pavlos Hairopoulos, it was created by the Greeks of Pontus themselves.

== Construction and mechanics ==
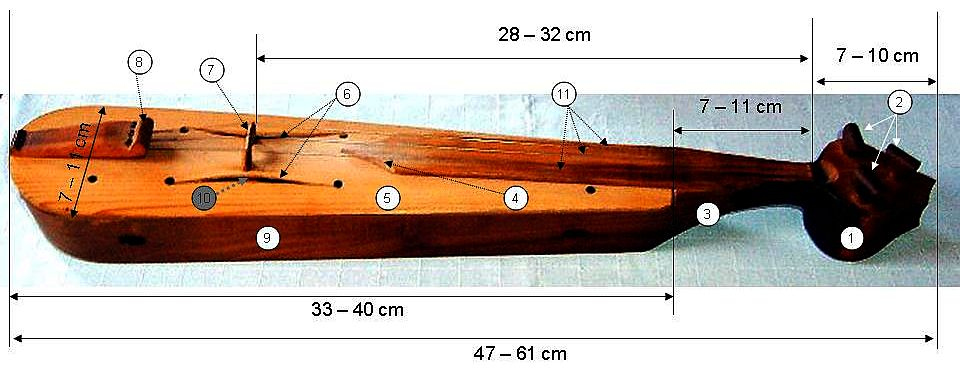
Pontian Lyra: # / Part Name / Meaning / Function; 1 / Tepe, To Kifal / Top, Head / Peg holder (same as the body); 2 / Kulak, Otia / Fist, Ears / Pegs; 3 / Boyun, Goula / Neck / Place for hand (same as the body); 4 / Kravat, Spaler / Bed, Slabbering bib / Fingerboard; 5 / Kapak / Cover / Soundboard; 6 / Ses delikleri, Rothonia / Sound holes, Nostrils / Soundholes; 7 / Eşek, Gaidaron / Donkey, Rider / Bridge (pine); 8 / Palikar / Stalwart Young Man / Tailpiece; 9 / Gövde, Soma / Body / Body (plum, mulberry, walnut, juniper); 10 / Can direği / Life post / Sound post (inside); 11 / Teller, Hordes / Strings / Strings

The most common material for the construction of the body, the pegbox and the neck of the instrument is the one-piece plum wood, as well as mulberry, walnut, cedar, acacia, etc., while the soundboard is made of pine or fir wood. Traditionally, plum wood is considered the best. According to tradition, the growth rings of the soundboard wood, if they are dense, perform the fine frequencies better, while if they are dilute the lower ones. Usually, the densest rings are placed on the highest string.

The Kemenche is distinguished by the uniqueness of its bottle-shaped form with a long neck and an oblong body. The pegbox is teardrop-shaped and is called "kifal" (Head) in the Pontic dialect. It is the upper part of the instrument. In the "kifal", the tuning keys are wedged, the "otia" (ears), which are T-shaped (usually) and the strings are tied to them, which, after crossing the whole instrument, end up in the tailpiece ("palikar"), a wooden component in the shape of an elongated inverted triangle, located at the bottom, on which the lower ends of the strings are attached. The three strings are attached to the bridge ("donkey"), a component that carries three incisions - notches to keep the strings stable. Inside the lyre, a piece of wood, the soundpost, is wedged. The sides of the instrument are flat and are called "magla" (cheeks). The neck ("goula") is the point at which the lyre player holds the instrument. The sound comes from two curved or straight soundholes, the "rothonia" (nostrils), and through holes in their ends, on the lid and on the side. A typical lyre has: two holes on each side, four holes in the soundboard (two at the top and two at the bottom) and one at each end of the soundholes.

=== Strings ===
The three single strings of the Pontian lyre until 1920 were made of silk and produced a nice melodic but low sound. Alternatively, the two highest were made of silk and the third was made of gut. The two highest strings were thinner than the third. Today the strings are metal, either two strings of equal thickness and one thinner, or two strings of equal thickness and one covered with wire.

=== Tuning ===
The Pontian lyre is tuned in perfect fourths. There are three different ways to play:

1. The tune is played on the highest string, with the next being used as a drone
2. The first two strings play the tune
3. The tune is played on the lowest string, with the next being used as a drone.

The lowest string is named "kapan" and the highest one "zil", and so do the respective types of the instrument.

=== Bow ===
The bow is a separate tool and necessary for the use of the instrument. Its name comes from the arc created by its fibers. It is a long wooden instrument, about 50 to 60 cm long, that has two sides, the front side has a bundle of fibers that end at its ends. The fibers passing from one end end at the other where they are tied there with leather. This point, which is cylindrical, is held with the dominant hand of the player and pressed with the middle finger

The fibers of the bow are male horse tail hairs (Mare hairs tend to be worn by her urine.)

== Playing ==
Young Pontian kemenche player in Trabzon, 1910 postcard

When using the instrument, the Pontian lyre player "plays" the lyre either standing or sitting. It is played in the downright position, either by resting it on the knee when sitting, or held in front of the player when standing.The lyre always has a slight tilt to the left. Although in the pear-shaped lyre of Crete, the Dodecanese, and Thrace the strings are pressed with the nail, in the bottle-shaped Pontian Lyre they are pressed with the core of the fingers, as in the violin.

== Bibliography ==
- Grillet, Laurent (1901). Schmid, Charles (ed.). Les ancêtres du violon et du violoncelle. Vol. 1. Paris: Librairie Générale des Arts Decoratifs.
- Özhan Öztürk (2005). Karadeniz: Ansiklopedik Sözlük Black Sea Encyclopedic Dictionary. 2 Cilt (2 Volumes). Heyamola Yayıncılık. İstanbul. ISBN 975-6121-00-9
- Margaret J. Kartomi: On Concepts and Classifications of Musical Instruments. Chicago Studies in Ethnomusicology, University of Chicago Press, 1990
- Petrides, Th. "Traditional Pontic dances accompanied by the Pontic lyra
- "Pontian Music"
- The New Grove Dictionary of Musical Instruments: Londra, 1984.
- Asuman Onaran: Kemençe Seslerinin Armonik Analizi, İstanbul, 1959.
- Laurence Picken: Folk Musical Instruments of Turkey, Londra, 1975.
- Rauf Yekta: Türk Musikisi (çev: Orhan Nasuhioğlu), İstanbul, 1986.
- Curt Sachs: The History of Musical Instruments, New York, 1940.
- Hedwig Usbeck: "Türklerde Musıki Aletleri", Musıki Mecmuası, no. 235 - 243, 1968 - 1969.
- Notes from a speech by V. Architektonidis, Founder and Director of the Palladium Conservatory of Athens, on: "The importance of the Pontian lyre in our cultural heritage" Argyroupoli 2005.
- Folklore Museum of the Municipality of Elliniko.
- Archive of the Union of Pontians of Argyroupolis.
- Pavlou D. Hairopoulos "Lyra".
