= Kemenche =

Various stringed bowed musical instruments from the Eastern Mediterranean

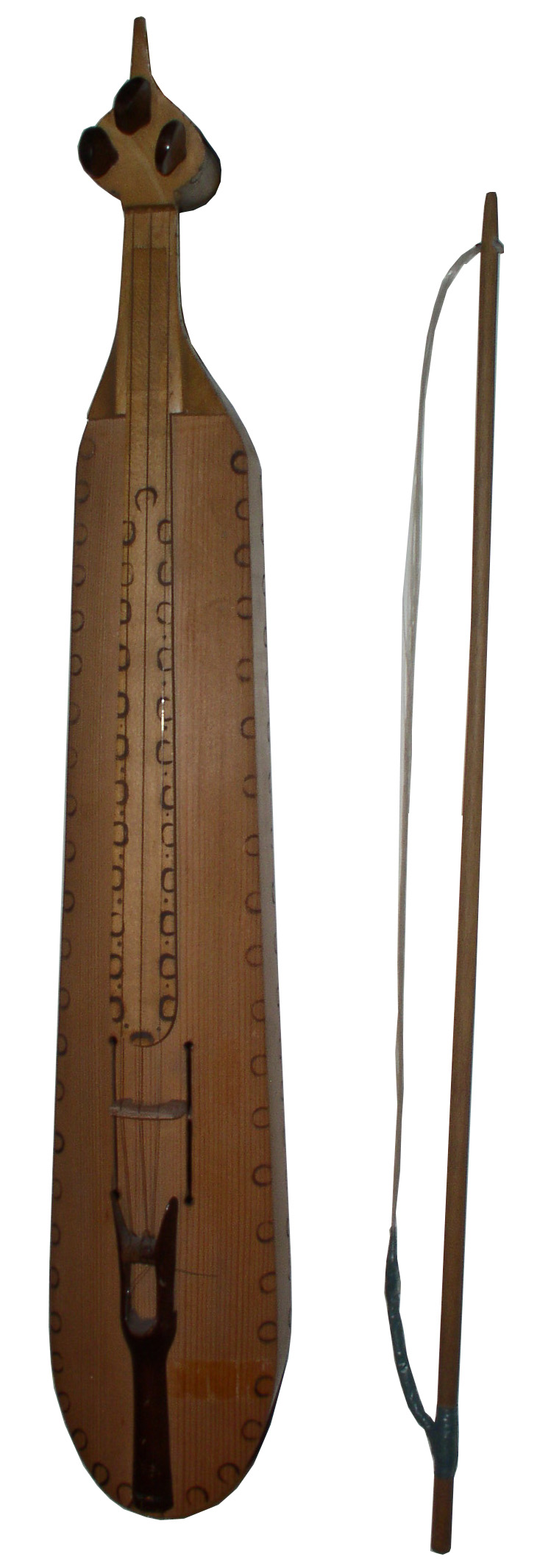
Kemençe of the Black Sea

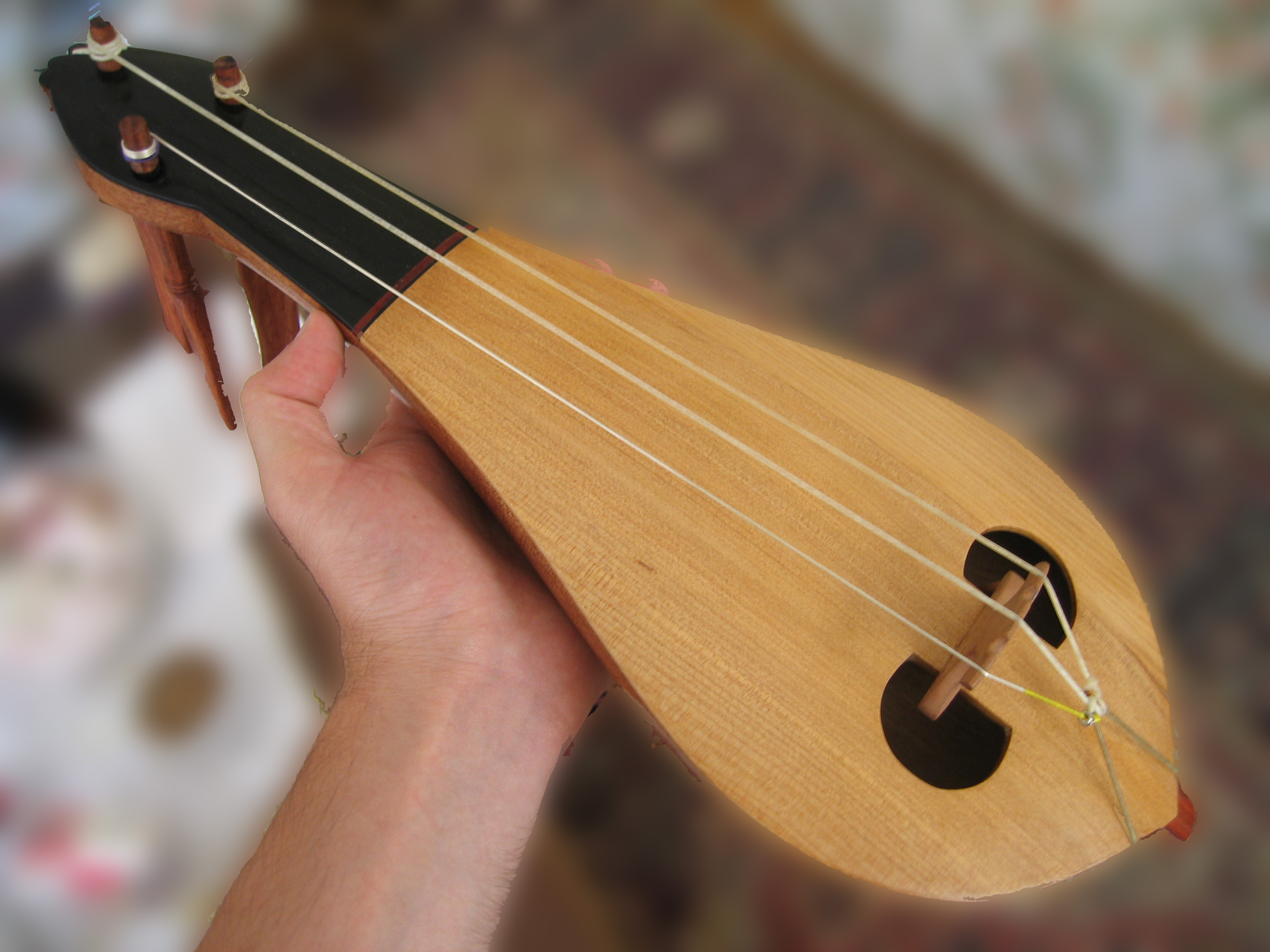
Classical kemençe

Kemenche (Turkish: kemençe; Greek: κεμεντζές) or kamancha (Persian: کمانچه; Armenian: Քամանչա) is a name used for various types of stringed bowed musical instruments originating in the Eastern Mediterranean, particularly in Greece, Armenia, Iran, Turkey, and Azerbaijan. and regions adjacent to the Black Sea. These instruments are folk instruments, generally having three strings and played held upright with their tail on the knee of the musician. The name Kemenche derives from the Persian Kamancheh, meaning a "small bow".

== Variations ==
The Kemençe of the Black Sea (Turkish: Karadeniz kemençesi), also known as Pontic kemenche or Pontic lyra (Greek: Ποντιακή λύρα), is a box-shaped lute (321.322 in the Hornbostel-Sachs system), while the classical kemençe (Turkish: Klasik kemençe or Armudî kemençe, Greek: Πολίτικη Λύρα, bowl-shaped lute (321.321) is a different instrument and closely related to the Byzantine lyra.

Other bowed instruments have names sharing the same Persian etymology include the kamancheh (or Kabak kemane in Turkish), a spike lute (321.31), and the Cappadocian kemane, an instrument closely related to the kemenche of the Black Sea with added sympathetic strings. Circassians have a similar instrument named the Shikepshine which means horse tail violin.

== See also ==
- Byzantine lyra
- Pochette (musical instrument)
