= Gusle =

Single-stringed musical instrument

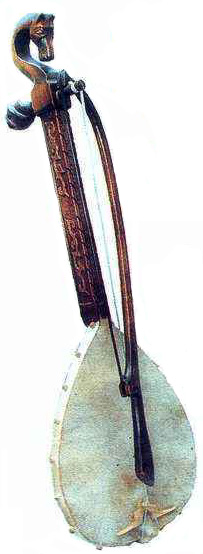
- Typical Serbian gusle

String instrument
- Classification: Bowed string instrument
- Hornbostel–Sachs classification: 321.321-71 (Bowl lyre sounded by a bow)

Related instruments
- Byzantine lyra and its derivatives; Masenqo (Horn of Africa); Other "fiddles"

Sound sample
- Serbian gusle The sound of the Serbian gusle

The gusle (Serbian Cyrillic: гусле) or lahuta (Albanian: lahutë; related to English lute) is a bowed single-stringed musical instrument (and musical style) traditionally used in the Dinarides region of Southeastern Europe (in the Balkans). The instrument is always accompanied by singing; musical folklore, specifically epic poetry. The gusle player (Serbian Cyrillic: гуслар, romanized: guslar; Albanian: lahutar) holds the instrument vertically between the knees, with the left hand fingers on the string. The string is never pressed to the neck, giving a harmonic and unique sound.

On November 29, 2018, the Serbian Gusle was inscribed as a part of Serbia's intangible cultural heritage on the UNESCO Intangible Cultural Heritage of Humanity.

On December 9, 2025, the Albanian Lahuta was inscribed on the UNESCO List of Intangible Cultural Heritage in Need of Urgent Safeguarding.

== Etymology ==
The Old Slavic root morpheme gǫdsli (cf. Russian gúsli, Slovak: husle, Czech: housle, Slovene: gósli) is associated with guditi/gósti, or gudalo/godalo, related to onomatopoeia for a low resonating sound; cf. gu(n)delj/гу(н)дељ = cockchafer, which makes such sound when flying.

The exact origin of the nominations of the related concepts gusle, gadulka, gudok and gudalo, the latter as the name for the bow of the gusle could also illuminate a more accurate assignment in the history of the gusle after Walther Wünsch.

In the parlance of the South Slavs, in addition to the feminine plurale tantum gusle that has prevailed as a lexeme, even the older "gusli", which is found in the area of the middle Drina River region to Arilje and throughout Montenegro. The use of the phonemes /e/ and /i/ is in the same language as the same speaker, or it can be used in lyrics or everyday speech.

The singular form gusla is found only in Eastern Serbia, west of the Timok, around Niš, Ivanjica, as well as in the area of Zlatibor. On Korčula only gusla is in use.

The term gusle by Alberto Fortis has been introduced into European literature. Gusle is in Serbian linguistic usage, however, a feminine plurale tantum (Serbo-Croatian: gusla or gusle, Albanian: lahuta or lahutë).

== Origin ==
There is no consensus about the origin of the instrument. 7th-century Byzantine Greek historian Theophylact Simocatta (fl. c. 630) wrote about "small lyres" brought by the Slavs who settled in the Balkans; some researchers believe that this might have been the gusle. Others, such as F. Sachs, believe that the gusle has an Oriental origin, brought to Europe in the 10th century via the Islamic cultural wave. Arab travellers report evidence that the Slavs used the gusle in the 10th century. Teodosije the Hilandarian (1246–1328) wrote that Stefan Nemanjić (r. 1196–1228) often entertained the Serbian nobility with musicians with drums and "gusle". Reliable written records about the gusle appear only in the 15th century. 16th-century travel memoirs mention the instrument in Bosnia and Serbia. In the 19th and 20th centuries the instrument was mentioned in Montenegro, Serbia, Bosnia and Herzegovina, Croatia and Albania (where it is called lahuta, "lute").

== Construction and use ==
The gusle consists of a wooden sound box, the maple being considered as the best material (therefore often the instrument is referred to as "gusle javorove" - maple gusle), covered with an animal skin and a neck with an intricately carved head. A bow is pulled over the string/s (made of horsetail), creating a dramatic and sharp sound, expressive and difficult to master. The string is made of thirty horsehairs.

The instrument is held vertically between the player's knees, with the left hand fingers on the neck. The strings are never pressed to the neck, giving a harmonic and unique sound. The most common and traditional version is single-stringed, while a much less-common version is the two-stringed found in Bosanska Krajina and in Lika.

The varieties of gusle music are based on cultural basis; the content of the stories of each ethnic group is different, as different epic poems are used to accompany the instrument. There is minor differing characteristics of vocality in the regions of Southeast Europe. The design of the instrument is identical; only the design of the neck and head varies with ethnic or national motif.

The gusle instrumentally accompanies heroic songs (epic poetry) in the Balkans.

=== Serbs ===
Singing to the accompaniment of the gusle
- UNESCO Intangible Cultural Heritage
- Country: Serbia
- Reference: 01377
- Region: Europe and North America

Inscription history
- Inscription: 2018 (13th session)
- List: Representative

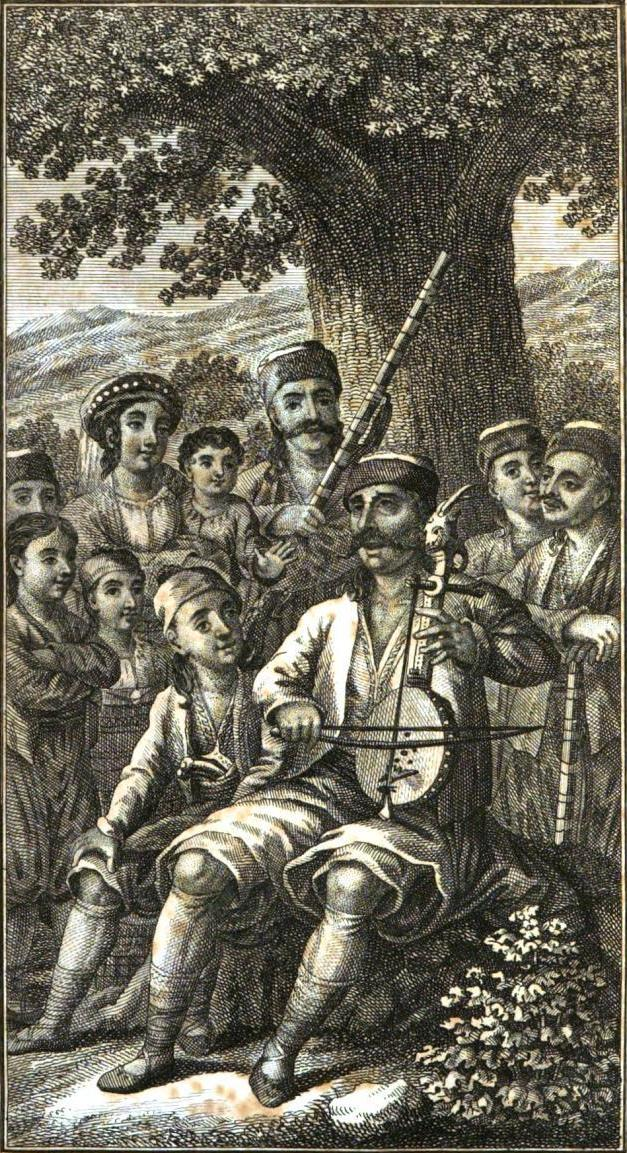
A Herzegovinian sings to the gusle (1823). Herzegovinian epic poems were often sung to the accompaniment of this instrument.

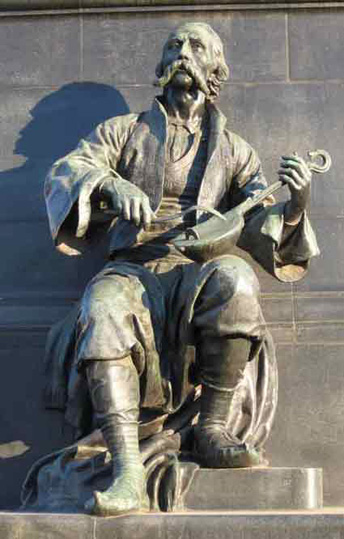
Filip Višnjić (1767–1834), a blind Serbian gusle

The Serbian gusle is a one-stringed instrument that is usually made of maple wood. A guslar (Serbian Cyrillic: гуслар) is an individual capable of reproducing and composing poems about heroes and historical events to the accompaniment of this instrument, usually in the decasyllable meter. There are records of an instrument named gousli (гоусли) being played at the court of the 13th-century Serbian King Stefan Nemanjić, but it is not certain whether the term was used in its present-day meaning or it denoted some other kind of string instrument. Polish poets of the 17th century mentioned the gusle in their works. In a poem published in 1612, Kasper Miaskowski wrote that "the Serbian gusle and gaidas will overwhelm Shrove Tuesday" (Serbskie skrzypki i dudy ostatek zagluszą). In the idyll named Śpiewacy, published in 1663, Józef Bartłomiej Zimorowic used the phrase "to sing to the Serbian gusle" (przy Serbskich gęślach śpiewać). In some older Serbian books on literature it was stated that a Serbian guslar performed at the court of Władysław II Jagiełło in 1415. The earliest known Serbian guslar is referred to in 1551 by Hungarian historian Sebastian Tinody, saying, "There are many gusle players here in Hungary, but none is better at the Serbian style than Dimitrije Karaman". In addition Sebastian describes the performance, explaining that the guslar would hold the gusle between the knees and goes into a highly emotional artistic performance with a sad and dedicated expression on their face.

The gusle has played a significant role in the history of Serbian epic poetry because of its association with the centuries-old patriotic oral legacy. Most of the epics are about the era of the Ottoman occupation and the struggle for the liberation from it. With the efforts of ethnographer Vuk Stefanović Karadžić, many of these epics have been collected and published in books in the first half of the 19th century. Serbian folk poetry was given a marvelous reception, as it appeared in Europe when Romanticism was in full bloom. This poetry, which appeared in Karadžić's anthological collections, met the "expectations" of the sophisticated European audience, becoming a living confirmation of Herder's and Grimm's ideas about the oral tradition. Jacob Grimm began to learn Serbian so that he could read the poems in the original. He wrote minute analyses of each new volume of Serbian folk songs. He ranked them as being equal to the Song of Songs, as did Goethe somewhat later. Thanks to Grimm, moreover to the initiatives of Slovene Jernej Kopitar (the censor for Slavonic books in Vienna, Karadžić's counselor and protector), Serbian folk literature found its place in the literature of the world.

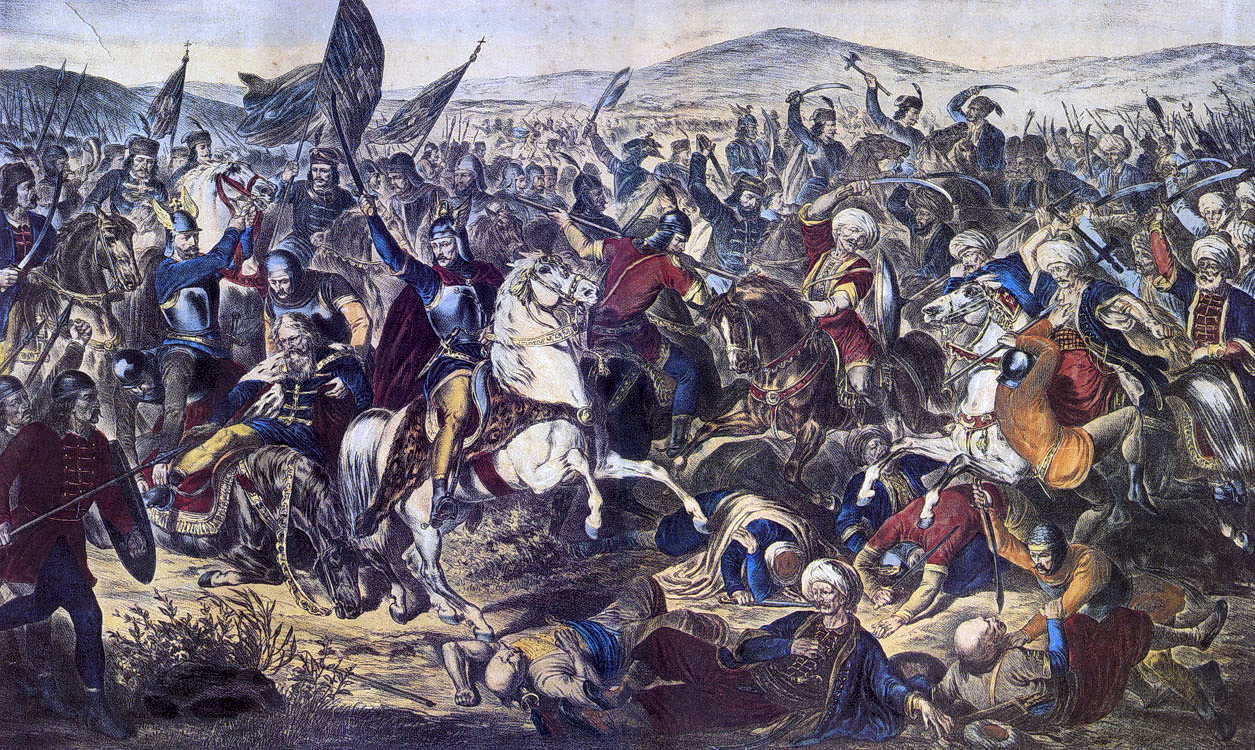
Poems about the Battle of Kosovo (1389) are among the most popular poems sung to the accompaniment of gusle.

Vuk Karadžić divided the epic songs he collected from guslars like Filip Višnjić and Tešan Podrugović into three cycles.

The first cycle includes songs from the earliest era of the medieval Serbian state and the era of the Serbian Empire. Some of the most well-known poems from this cycle include The Wedding of Emperor Dušan (Ženidba cara Dušana), The Building of Skadar (Ženidba Dušanova) and Uroš and Mrnjavčevići (Uroš i Mrnjavčevići)

The next cycle includes songs about the Battle of Kosovo (1389) and the events related to it. The most famous song is the Prince's Curse (Kneževa kletva), in which Miloš Obilić and Prince Lazar are main characters. The Kosovo Battle is probably the most important event in Serbian epic poetry. Singing songs about the Battle of Kosovo to gusle significantly influenced the birth of the Kosovo Myth.

The last cycle includes songs about the events after the Battle of Kosovo. They sing about the first battles against the Ottomans and conflicts between Serbian nobles. A famous poem from that era is the poem about Strahinja Banović. The greatest hero of this cycle is Marko Kraljević. Poems about the chivalry of hajduks and uskos who resisted the Ottomans also belong to that cycle. Some of them are Starina Novak, Stanoje Glavaš, Starac Vujadin, Janković Stojan, Ilija Smiljanić, Bajo Pivljanin and Hajduk Veljko. Battles between Montenegrins and the Ottomans (Battle of Vučij Do, Battle of Grahovo, Battle of Fundina) were also sung, as well as the Serbian Revolution and its heroes: Karađorđe, Hajduk Veljko, Aleksa Nenadović, Ilija Birčanin, Tanasko Rajić, Vasa Čarapić and Miloš Obrenović.

More recent poems sing about recent battles and wars for the liberation of Serbia and Montenegro, such as the Serbian–Ottoman Wars of 1876–1878, the Herzegovina Uprising, the Balkan Wars, the Siege of Skadar, the First World War, and the Battle of Mojkovac. One of the participants in the Battle of Mojkovac, Radovan Bećirović Trebješki, would become the most famous modern writer of Serbian epic poems.

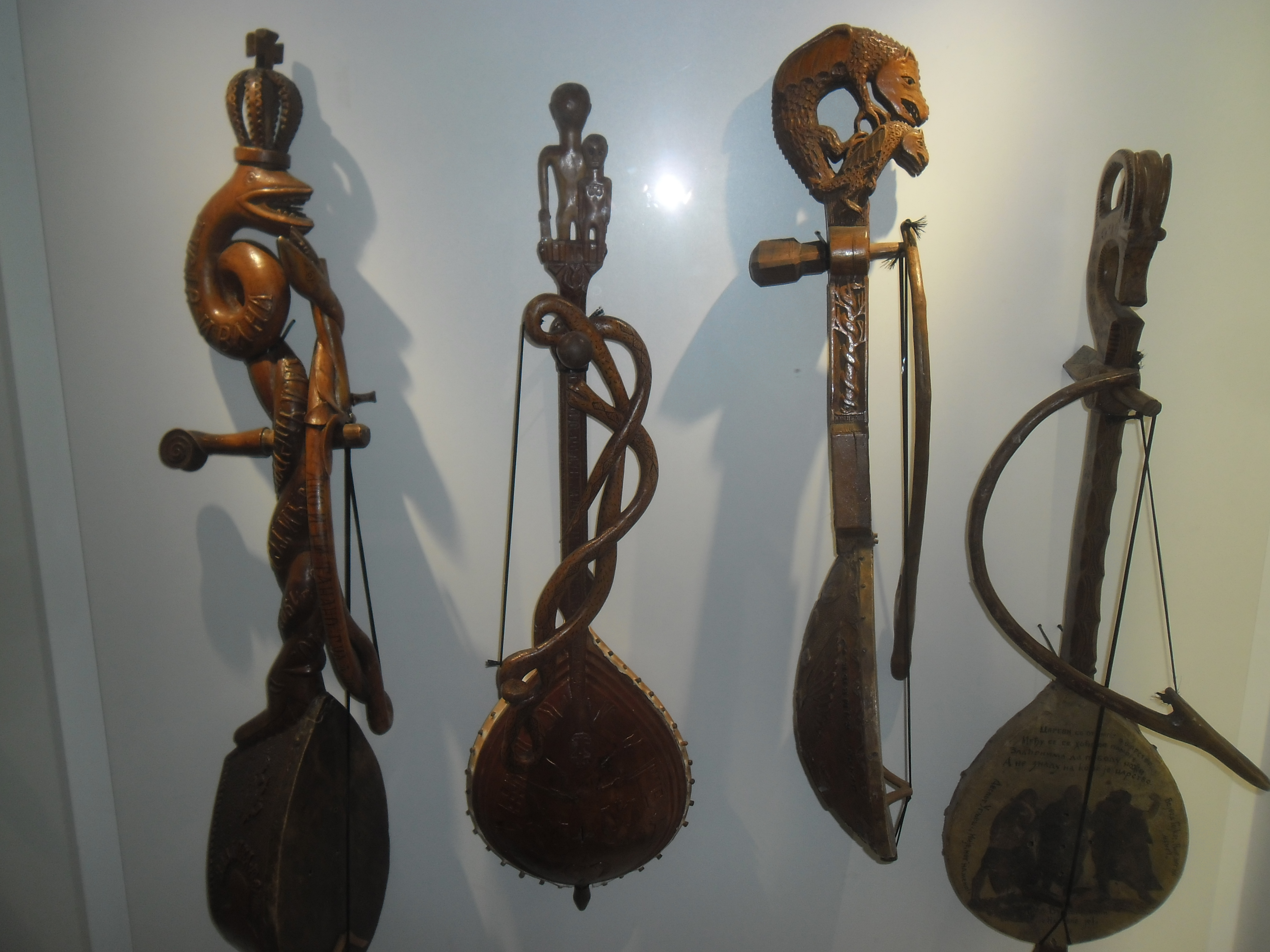
gusle in the Ethnographic Museum of Montenegro in Cetinje.

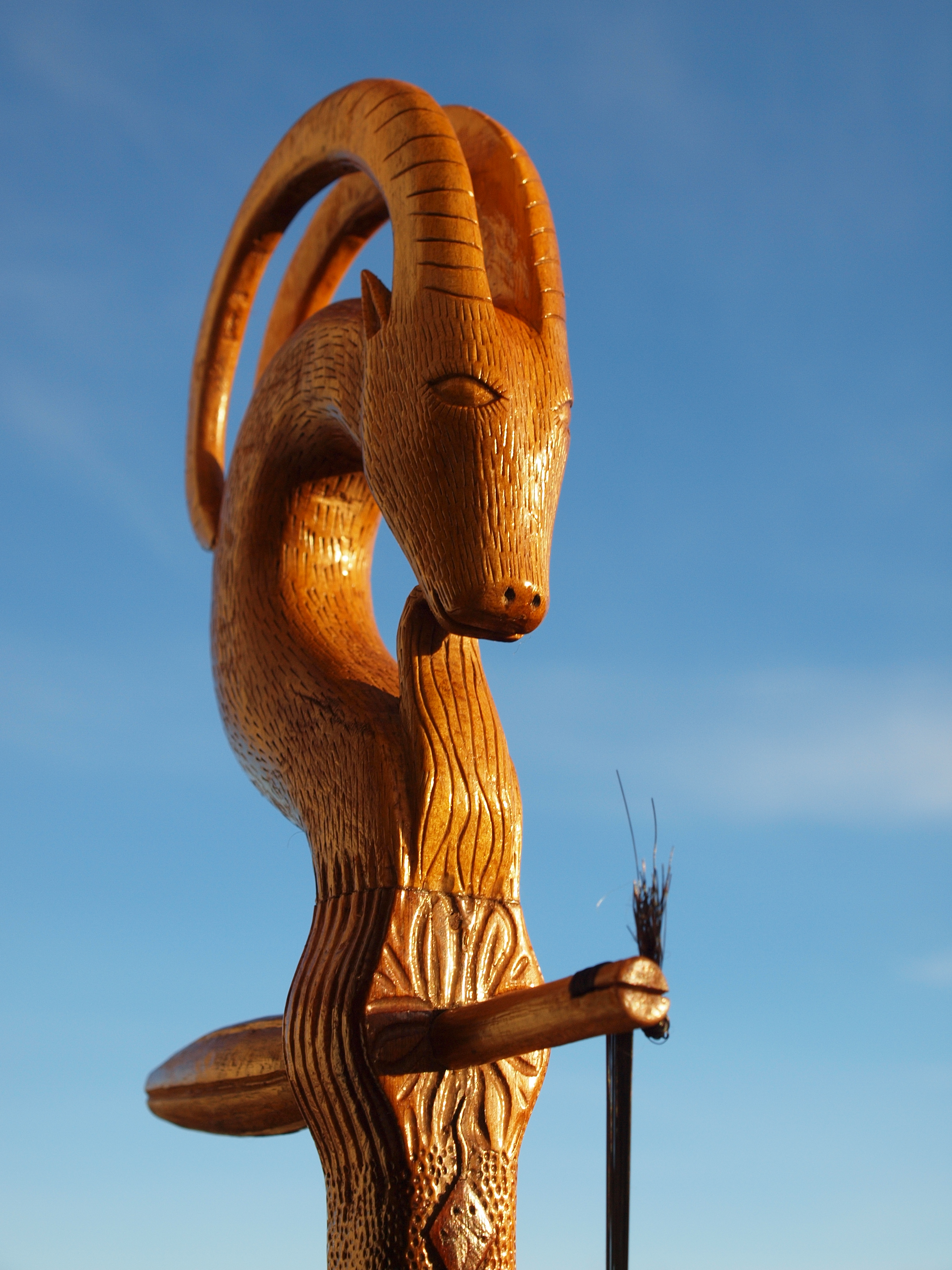
gusle with the top part carved in the likeness of a goat.

Although the gusle was played throughout the entire former territory of the Serbian Empire, and later in the areas to the north and west - in Vojvodina and in the Military Frontier, today the tradition of playing gusle is strongest in Herzegovina and Montenegro, where Serbian medieval culture has been best preserved. That is why gusle today are mostly decorated with details that remind of the heroic past of these areas. Many gusle are decorated with carved motifs depicting scenes from battles (Battle of Vučji Do, Nevesinjska Puška), characters of famous Serbs (Saint Sava, Petar Petrović Njegoš, Karađorđe, Nicholas I of Montenegro) or famous places (Ostrog Monastery, Cetinje Monastery and Lovćen Chapel).

Guslar Srđan Avdalović performing during Festgħana 2026 in Malta as part of the annual showcase of UNESCO intangible cultural heritage

In all major cities, such as Belgrade, Podgorica, East Sarajevo, Banja Luka, Cetinje, Pljevlja, Užice, Novi Sad, Niš, Nikšić and Kraljevo, there are guslar societies that organize concerts and gusle evenings (Serbian: гусларске вечери, romanized: guslarske večeri). Guslar Society "Vuk Karadžić" is the oldest existing guslar society in Belgrade. The societies are organized into three guslar federations - in Serbia, Montenegro and the Republic of Srpska. Gusle competitions called festivals are organized regularly. There are numerous youth competitions and festivals for seniors, but the biggest competition being the Federal Festival of Gusle (Serbian: Савезни фестивал гусала, romanized: Savezni festival gusala). Competitors are the highest-ranked guslars at festivals in Serbia, Montenegro and Republika Srpska. The champion is considered the best Serbian guslar that year. Most famous modern Serbian guslars are Branko Perović, Boško Vujačić, Đorđije Đoko Koprivica, Milomir Miljanić Miljan, Saša Laketić and Maksim Vojvodić.

Singing to the accompaniment of the gusle as a part of Serbia's tradition was inscribed in 2018 on the Intangible Cultural Heritage Lists of UNESCO after years of Serbian guslars' efforts.

=== Bosniaks ===
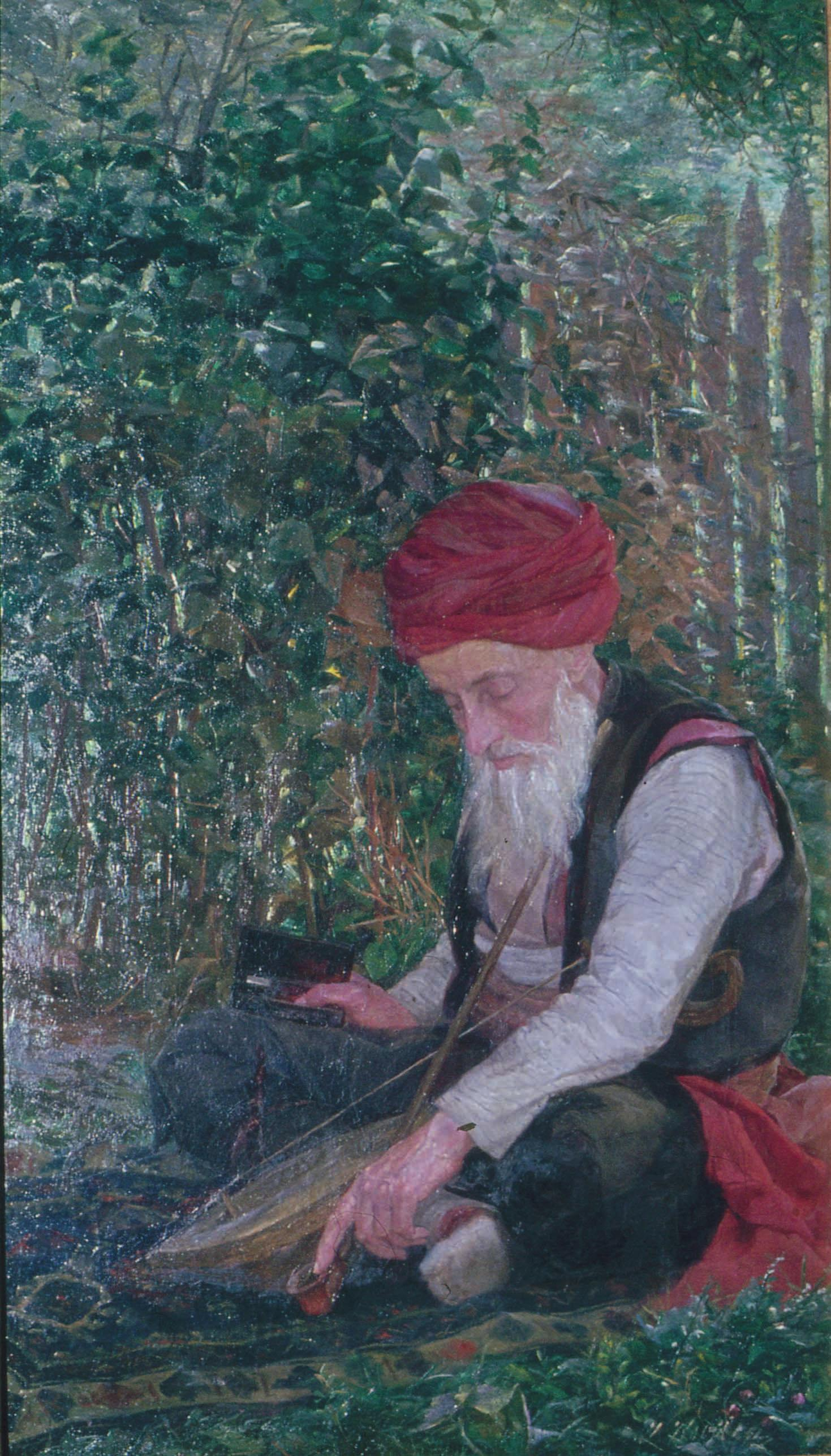
A Bosniak playing gusle, painting by Ivana Kobilca, c. 1900

There are few active Bosniak guslari today, but there were many examples in history. Guslari were always guests at the Bosniak beg's courtyards, and it was with gusle they performed Bosniak heroic songs about prominent figures or events. In these songs were Đerzelez Alija, Mujo Hrnjica, Mustay-Bey of Lika The Battle of Banja Luka or the Battle at Očakov.

Avdo Međedović was the most versatile and skillful guslari encountered by Milman Parry and Albert Lord during their research in the oral epic tradition of Bosnia, Herzegovina and Montenegro in the 1930s. At Parry's request, Avdo sang songs he already knew and some songs he heard in front of Parry, convincing him that someone Homer-like could produce a poem so long. Avdo dictated, over five days, a version of the well-known theme The Wedding of Meho Smailagić that was 12,323 lines long, saying on the fifth day to Nikola (Parry's assistant on the journey) that he knew even longer songs. On another occasion, he sang over several days an epic of 13,331 lines. He said he had several others of similar length in his repertoire. In Parry's first tour, over 80,000 lines were transcribed.

=== Albanians ===
Art of playing, singing and making the lahuta
- UNESCO Intangible Cultural Heritage
- Country: Albania
- Reference: 02310
- Region: Europe and North America

Inscription history
- Inscription: 2025 (20th session)
- List: Need of Urgent Safeguarding

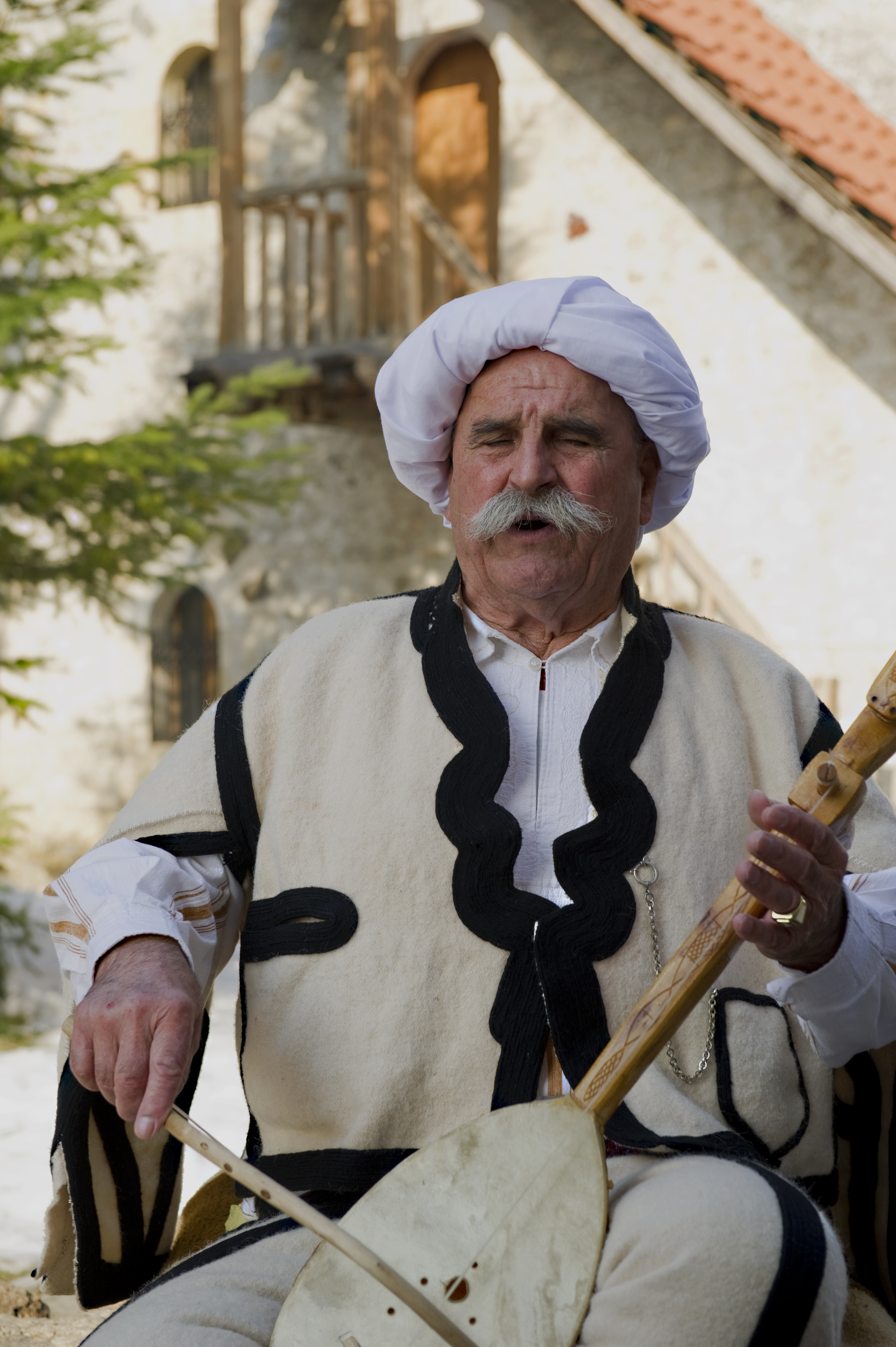
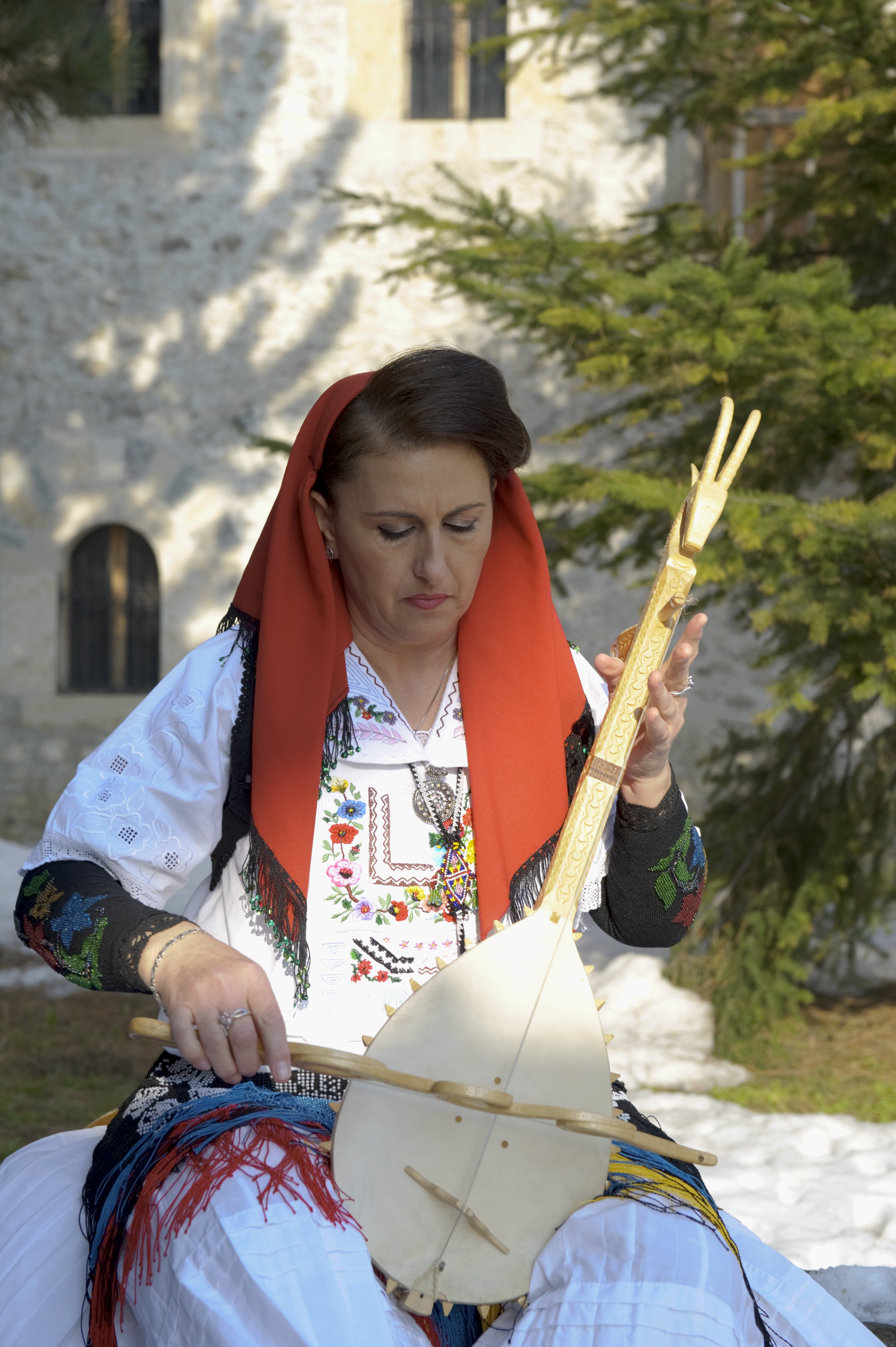
Gheg Albanians playing the lahuta while singing epic songs.

The lahuta is used by Gheg Albanians of Kosovo, northern Albania and Montenegro (Malësia), for the singing of epic songs, in particular the Kângë Kreshnikësh. In Albanian types, the lahuta's head is often carved after a goat's, a ram's, or a horse's head, or a hawk, the latter representing the Albanian flag.

It is played by a lahutar, the Albanian equivalent to a rhapsode or bard. The songs are octosyllable, in relation to the decasyllable Serbian.

The use of lahuta is traditionally mastered in the Highlands and Malësi e Madhe District. Gjergj Fishta, the Albanian national poet and priest, wrote the book Lahuta e Malcís which is often played with a lahuta. The famous Albanian song about Gjergj Elez Alia, the Albanian mythological hero who slays a beast that rises from the sea, is also played with a lahuta.

A good number of Albanian epic singers (Albanian: lahutarë or rapsodë) can be found today in Kosovo and northern Albania, and some also in Montenegro. The Albanian traditional singing of epic verse from memory is one of the last survivors of its kind in modern Europe, and the last survivor of the Balkan traditions.

== See also ==
- Berimbau

== Sources ==
- Bjeladinović-Jergić, Jasna (2001). Зборник Етнографског музеја у Београду: 1901-2001. Етнографски музеј. p. 489. ISBN 9788678910081.
- Ling, Jan (1997). "Narrative Song in the Balkans". A History of European Folk Music. University Rochester Press. pp. 86–90. ISBN 978-1-878822-77-2.
- Vlahović, Petar (2004). Serbia: the country, people, life, customs. Ethnographic Museum. ISBN 978-86-7891-031-9.
