= List of Serbian epic poems =

List of Serbian epic folk poems categorized by cycles

This is a list of Serbian epic poems (Serbian: српске епске народне песме, romanized: Srpske epske narodne pesme), categorized by their traditional cycles.

== Non-historic cycle ==
The non-historic or mythological cycle deals with mythological beings, Christian saints, and legends unrelated to specific historical events.

- Bog nikom dužan ne ostaje (God Leaves No One in Debt)
- Braća i sestra (Brothers and Sister)
- Ko krsno ime slavi, onom i pomaže (He Who Celebrates the Slava, Is Helped by It)
- Ognjena Marija u paklu (Fiery Maria in Hell)
  - Ognjena Marija u paklu, ali drukčije (Fiery Maria in Hell, version 2)
- Sveti Nikola (Saint Nicholas)
- Sveci blago dijele (The Saints Divide the Treasure)

== Pre-Kosovo cycle ==
Poems dealing with events and figures preceding the Battle of Kosovo, mostly focusing on the Nemanjić dynasty and the Mrnjavčević family.

- Ban Milutin i Duka Hercegovac (Ban Milutin and Duka of Herzegovina)
- Darovi svetog Jovana Vladimira (The Gifts of Saint Jovan Vladimir)
- Dijete Jovan i ćerka cara Stefana (Child Jovan and the Daughter of Tsar Stefan)
- Dušan hoće sestru da uzme (Dušan Wants to Marry His Sister)
- Ženidba Dušanova (The Wedding of Dušan)
- Ženidba kneza Lazara (The Wedding of Prince Lazar)
- Ženidba kralja Vukašina (The Wedding of King Vukašin)
- Zidanje Ravanice (The Building of Ravanica)
- Zidanje Ravanice, opet (The Building of Ravanica, again)
- Zidanje Skadra (The Building of Skadar)
- Kako se krsno ime služi (How the Slava is Observed)
- Kralj Vladimir i Sveti Naum (King Vladimir and Saint Naum)
- Milan-beg i Dragutin-beg (Milan-beg and Dragutin-beg)
- Miloš u Latinima (Miloš Among the Latins)
- Nahod Momir (Foundling Momir)
- Put kralja Vladimira (The Journey of King Vladimir)
- Sveti Savo (Saint Sava)
- Smrt Dušanova (The Death of Dušan)
- Smrt cara Uroša (The Death of Tsar Uroš)
- Tri dobra junaka (Three Good Heroes)
- Udaja sestre Dušanove (The Marriage of Dušan's Sister)
- Uroš i Mrnjavčevići (Uroš and the Mrnjavčevićs)
- Car Duklijan i Krstitelj Jovan (Emperor Diocletian and John the Baptist)
- Car Kostantin i đače samouče (Emperor Constantine and the Self-Taught Student)
- Carica Milica i zmaj od Jastrepca (Tsaritsa Milica and the Dragon of Jastrebac)

== Kosovo cycle ==
Poems centering on the Battle of Kosovo (1389).

- Banović Strahinja
- Kneževa večera (The Prince's Supper)
- Kneževa kletva (The Prince's Curse)
- Kosančić Ivan uhodi Turke (Kosančić Ivan Spies on the Turks)
- Miloš u Kosovu (Miloš in Kosovo)
- Kosovka devojka (The Kosovo Maiden)
- Kosovski boj (The Battle of Kosovo)
- Musić Stevan
- Obretenije glave kneza Lazara (The Finding of Prince Lazar's Head)
- Propast carstva srpskoga (The Fall of the Serbian Empire)
- Sluga Milutin (Servant Milutin)
- Smrt majke Jugovića (The Death of the Mother of the Jugovićs)
- Smrt Miloša Dragilovića (Obilića) (The Death of Miloš Obilić)
- Car Lazar i carica Milica (Tsar Lazar and Tsaritsa Milica)
- Car Lazar se privoleva carstvu nebeskom (Tsar Lazar Chooses the Heavenly Kingdom)
- Carica Milica i Vladeta vojvoda (Tsaritsa Milica and Duke Vladeta)

== Cycle of Marko Kraljević ==
Poems about Prince Marko (Marko Kraljević).

- Djevojka nadmudrila Marka (The Girl Who Outwitted Marko)
- Sestra Leke kapetana (The Sister of Captain Leka)
- Ženidba Marka Kraljevića (The Wedding of Marko Kraljević)
- Lov Markov sa Turcima (Marko's Hunt with the Turks)
- Marko Kraljević i 12 Arapa (Marko Kraljević and the 12 Arabs)
- Marko Kraljević i Alil-aga (Marko Kraljević and Alil-Aga)
- Marko Kraljević i Arapin (Marko Kraljević and the Arab)
- Marko Kraljević i beg Kostadin (Marko Kraljević and Bey Kostadin)
- Marko Kraljević i brat mu Andrijaš (Marko Kraljević and His Brother Andrijaš)
- Marko Kraljević i vila (Marko Kraljević and the Vila)
- Marko Kraljević i Vuča dženeral (Marko Kraljević and General Vuča)
- Marko Kraljević i Đemo Brđanin (Marko Kraljević and Đemo the Highlander)
- Marko Kraljević i kći kralja Arapskoga (Marko Kraljević and the Daughter of the Arab King)
- Marko Kraljević i Ljutica Bogdan (Marko Kraljević and Ljutica Bogdan)
- Marko Kraljević i Mina od Kostura (Marko Kraljević and Mina of Kostur)
- Marko Kraljević i Musa Kesedžija (Marko Kraljević and Musa the Outlaw)
- Marko Kraljević i orao (Marko Kraljević and the Eagle)
- Marko Kraljević i soko (Marko Kraljević and the Falcon)
- Marko Kraljević i Filip Madžarin (Marko Kraljević and Filip the Hungarian)
- Marko Kraljević u Azačkoj tamnici (Marko Kraljević in the Azak Prison)
- Marko Kraljević ukida svadbarinu (Marko Kraljević Abolishes the Wedding Tax)
- Marko pije uz ramazan vino (Marko Drinks Wine During Ramadan)
- Marko poznaje očinu sablju (Marko Recognizes His Father's Sabre)
- Oranje Marka Kraljevića (Marko Kraljević's Ploughing)
- Smrt Kraljevića Marka (The Death of Marko Kraljević)
- Turci u Marka na slavi (Turks at Marko's Slava)

== Post-Kosovo cycle ==
Poems about the period following the Battle of Kosovo, involving the despotate period and the Jakšić family.

- Orao se vijaše nad gradom Smederevom (An Eagle Soared Over the City of Smederevo) – Oldest preserved record, 1497
- Bolani Dojčin (Sick Dojčin)
- Dioba Jakšića (The Division of the Jakšićs)
- Đurđeva Jerina (George's Jerina)
- Ženidba Đurđa Smederevca (The Wedding of Đurađ of Smederevo)
- Ženidba Popović Stojana (The Wedding of Stojan Popović)
- Kad je Vuk Ognjeni umro šta je naredio na samrti (What Fiery Vuk Ordered on His Deathbed)
- Margita djevojka i vojvoda Rajko (The Maiden Margita and Duke Rajko)
- Oblak Radosav
- Oslobođenje Beča od Turaka (The Liberation of Vienna from the Turks)
- Porča od Avale i Zmajognjeni Vuk (Porča of Avala and Fiery Dragon Vuk)
- Smrt vojvode Kajice (The Death of Duke Kajica)
- Smrt vojvode Prijezde (The Death of Duke Prijezda)
- Smrt Maksima Crnojevića (The Death of Maksim Crnojević)

== Hajduk and Uskok poems ==
Poems regarding the Hajduks (outlaws/freedom fighters) and Uskoks.

- Ivo Senković i aga od Ribnika (Ivo Senković and the Aga of Ribnik)
- Ženidba od Zadra Todora (The Wedding of Todor of Zadar)
- Mali Radojica (Little Radojica)
- Otac (The Father)
- Predrag i Nenad (Predrag and Nenad)
- Ropstvo Janković Stojana (The Captivity of Stojan Janković)
- Smrt Senjanina Iva (The Death of Ivo of Senj)
- Stari Vujadin (Old Vujadin)
- Starina Novak i knez Bogosav (Starina Novak and Knez Bogosav)

== Poems about the liberation of Serbia and Montenegro ==
Poems covering the 19th-century uprisings, particularly the First Serbian Uprising.

- Boj na Mišaru (The Battle of Mišar)
- Boj na Salašu (The Battle of Salaš)
- Boj na Čokešini (The Battle of Čokešina)
- Ženidba Todora od Stalaća (The Wedding of Todor of Stalać)
- Knez Ivan Knežević (Prince Ivan Knežević)
- Lazar Mutap i Arapin (Lazar Mutap and the Arab)
- Perović Batrić
- Početak bune protiv dahija (Start of the Revolt against the Dahijas)
- Rastanak Kara-Đorđija sa Srbijom (Karađorđe's Farewell to Serbia)
- Tri sužnja (Three Captives)
- Uzimanje Užica (The Taking of Užice)

== Unclassified ==
- Dunav se Savom oženio (The Danube Married the Sava)
- Deseterac o Pavlu Stremljaninu i Đerzelez Aliji (Decasyllable about Pavle Stremljanin and Đerzelez Alija) – Siege of Šabac
- Đakon Stefan i dva anđela (Deacon Stefan and Two Angels)
- Žali Zare da žalimo (Mourn Zare, So We May Mourn)
- Zaručnica Laza Radanovića (The Betrothed of Laza Radanović)
- Jovan i divski starješina (Jovan and the Giant Chief)
- Jurišić Janko
- Kumovanje Grčića Manojla (The Godfathering of Grčić Manojlo)
- Ljutica Bogdan i vojvoda Dragija (Ljutica Bogdan and Duke Dragija)
- Mujo i Alija (Mujo and Alija)
- Ni zorice, ni bijela danka (Neither Dawn Nor White Day)
- Popijevka Radića Vukojevića (The Song of Radić Vukojević)
- Sekula se u zmiju pretvorio (Sekula Turned Into a Snake)

== See also ==
- Serbian epic poetry

== Literature ==
- Stefanović Karadžić, Vuk (1814). Mala prostonarodna slaveno-serbska pjesnarica. Vienna. https://books.google.com/books?id=_z8dAAAAMAAJ.
- Stefanović Karadžić, Vuk (1815). Narodna srbska pjesnarica. Vienna. https://books.google.com/books?id=K-pVAAAAcAAJ.
- Stefanović Karadžić, Vuk (1845). Srpske narodne pjesme. Vienna: Štamparija jermenskog manastira. https://books.google.com/books?id=MKg4AQAAMAAJ.
- Bogišić, Valtazar (1878). Narodne pjesme iz starijih, najviše primorskih zapisa. Biograd na Moru: Državna štamparija. https://books.google.com/books?id=EL1HAQAAMAAJ.
- Erlangenski rukopis starih srpskohrvatskih narodnih pesama. Sremski Karlovci. 1925. https://books.google.com/books?id=ZMo4NQEACAAJ.
