= Strahinja =

- Gender: Male

Origin
- Origin: Serb
- Meaning: Great fear
- Region of origin: Serbia

Other names
- Alternative spelling: Страхиња, Страхинья
- Related names: Strahimir, Stracimir, Strachkvas, Strašimir, Straš

Strahinja (Serbian Cyrillic: Страхиња) is a Serbian given name meaning “great fear”. The name is a protective name, dating back to medieval Serbia, the oldest written document with this name being from 1322 as 'Страхинья'.

The root of the name is the word strah, meaning 'fear' (from Proto-Slavic *straxъ), while the ending -inja is an augmentative suffix thus giving the final meaning of "big/great fear". The name is given to the bearer in order to protect him from evil spirits or forces as the bearer is supposed to evoke fear in those spirits, who would avoid him as a consequence.

Nicknames can include Strale, Straja, Strajo, Straha, Straho, Stašo, Staško, Strašo, Straško, Strajin, Strajan, Strajko, Strahac, Strahinjica and Strajovina (Ctraja-Ctrlaja).

== People ==
- Strahinja Banović is the protagonist of the eponymous Serbian epic poem and film; he may be identified with the historical figure Đurađ II Stracimirović Balšić.
- Strahinja Jovančević, Serbian long jumper
- Strahinja Milošević, Serbian basketball player
- Strahinja Pavlović, Serbian footballer
- Strahinja Petrović, Serbian footballer
- Strahinja Stanišić, Serbian alpine skier
- Strahinja Stojačić, Serbian basketball player

== See also ==
- Silvije Strahimir Kranjčević is a 19th-century Croatian poet. ("mir" meaning "peace")
