= Petar Perunović =

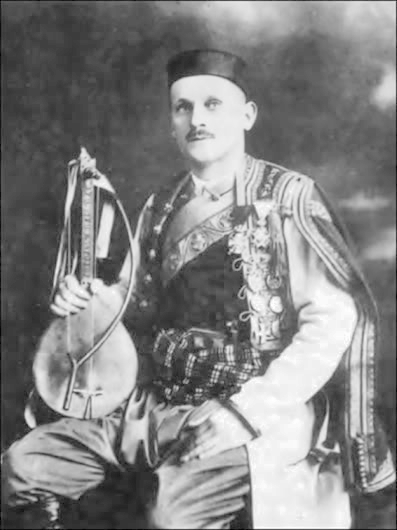
image of Petar Perunovic Perun Guslar

Petar Perunović (Serbian Cyrillic: Петар Перуновић) (1880 – 10 June 1952), nicknamed Perun, was a famous Serbian gusle player from Montenegro. He was also a highly decorated World War I Serbian officer.

Perunović was born in 1880 at Drenovštica in Pješivci, Princedom of Montenegro, and at an early age displayed an exceptional skill for the gusle, an ancient Balkan instrument. He began taking lessons, given by his mentor Ilija Kontić, at the same time that he was attending grammar school in his native village. In 1900 he left Montenegro for Šabac, Serbia, where his music instructor was R. Tolinger. He brought himself to notice in Belgrade in 1908 by performing before a colossal monument to Prince Mihailo in protest against the Bosnian crisis. In Negotin, he graduated from Teacher's College in 1910. His teaching career was interrupted by the two Balkan wars and World War I in which he took an active part. Petar was a brave soldier and a respected Serbian officer. He fought from 1912 to 1918. On his chest, all the decorations are easily recognizable, including the star of Karađorđe with swords of the fourth order, being the most coveted.

After the wars, he began to teach for a short period before leaving for the United States with the commander of the First Supernumerary Regiment, Milan Pribićević, on a prolonged tour of Serbian communities there. In New York City, Cleveland, Detroit, and Chicago, he entertained the early Serbian immigrants with patriotic songs and recorded many albums under the "Serb Gusle" label founded by Serb emigrants from Serbia, Vojvodina, Romanian Banat, Slavonia, Dalmatia, Croatia, Bosnia-Hercegovina, South Serbia, Kosovo, Macedonia, and Montenegro in America. He performed before prominent Serbs of his day, including Nikola Tesla and Michael Pupin.

Books and articles were written about him, he was known to all the battle-hardened volunteers and the most famous senior officers of the Serbian army.

He died in his native Montenegro in 1952.

== Discography ==
Serb epic Rebellion against the Dahijas/Turkish Officers, Serb Gusle label founded by Serb emigrants in the U.S., recorded by Marsh Laboratories, Chicago, 1920s.

== See also ==
- Dimitrije Karaman
- Živana Antonijević
- Old Rashko
- Tešan Podrugović
- Filip Višnjić
- Djuro Milutinović the Blind
