= Strahinja Banović (disambiguation) =

Strahinja Banović (died 1389) was a hero of Serbian epic poetry.

Strahinja Banović may also refer to:

- The Falcon, 1981 film by Vatroslav Mimica
- As Far as I Can Walk, 2021 film by Stefan Arsenijević
