= Tešan Podrugović =

Serbian merchant, hayduk, storyteller and gusle player

- Born: Тешан Подруговић; 1775; Kazanci, Nikšić, Sanjak of Herzegovina, Ottoman Empire
- Died: 1815 (aged 39–40); Sremski Karlovci, Austrian Empire
- Occupations: Serbian hayduk, storyteller and gusle player

Tešan Podrugović (Serbian: Тешан Подруговић; 1775–1815), also known as Teša Podrug (Теша Подруг), was a Serb merchant, hajduk, storyteller and gusle player (Serbian: guslar) who participated in the First Serbian Uprising and Second Serbian Uprising. He was one of the most important sources for Serbian epic poetry recorded by Vuk Karadžić. Podrugović did not sing but used to 'speak' his poems; he understood and felt the poems and thought about what he said. He was Serbia's best known fiddle player (guslar) after Filip Višnjić.

Podrugović's family was from the village of Kazanci in the municipality of Nikšić.

== Songs ==
Vuk Karadžić recorded for the first time many songs sung by Podrugović. The poem about Musa Kesedžija, named Marko Kraljević and Musa Kesedžija, recited by Podrugović was recorded for the first time in Sremski Karlovci in 1815 by Vuk Karadžić. The song about General Vuča was also recorded by Karadžić, based on the singing of Podrugović.

== See also ==
- Dimitrije Karaman
- Filip Višnjić
- Živana Antonijević
- Old Rashko
- Petar Perunović
- Đuro Milutinović the Blind
- Marko Utvić
- Blind Jeca (Jelisaveta Marković, called "Blind Jeca," was Živana's pupil)
- Stepanija
- Milia

== Sources ==
- Zlatković, Branko (2022). "Hajdučka biografija Tešana Podrugovića". Danica: 417–428. ISSN 0354-4974.
- Zlatković, Branko (2017). "Казивања о Тешану Подруговићу". 200 ГОДИНА СУСРЕТА ТЕШАНА И ВУКА (PDF). СПКД „ПРОСВЈЕТА“. pp. 77–85. ISBN 978-99976-715-1-6.
- "Научни скуп о народном пјевачу Тешану Подруговићу". 4 January 2026.
