= Perunović =

Perunović (Serbian: Перуновић) is a surname. Notable people with the surname include:

- Miodrag Perunović (born 1957), Montenegrin boxer and poet
- Petar Perunović (1880–1952), guslar
- Slađana Perunović (born 1984), long-distance runner
