= Alil-aga =

Alil-aga (Serbian: Алил-ага) or Halil Aga is a popular legendary hero of Serbian epic poetry who is depicted as enemy of Kraljević Marko. He might have been based on Ottoman Grand Vizier Çandarlı Ali Pasha of the Battle of Kosovo period.

Alil-aga first appeared in the poem Marko Kraljević and Alil-aga, which was sung by Živana Antonijević and recorded by Vuk Karadžić. In this song Marko is cunning and humorous. This song corresponds to the motif from Legends about Theoderic the Great. In this song Živana talks of the holy duty of pobratismo (blood brotherhood). When Alil-aga realizes that he is going to lose and will have to pay with his life, he pleads to Marko to accept his pledge of 'brother-unto-God'. Both men become brothers for life. In the song "Marko Kraljević and Nina of Kostur", Alil-aga is referred to as Marko's old bloodbrother.
