= Fatih Sultan Mehmet Mosque =

Former religious building in Shkodër, Albania

Fatih Sultan Mehmet Mosque; St Stephen's Cathedral in Rozafa
- Xhamia e Sulltan Mehmet Fatihut; Katedralja e Shën Shtjefnit në Rozafë
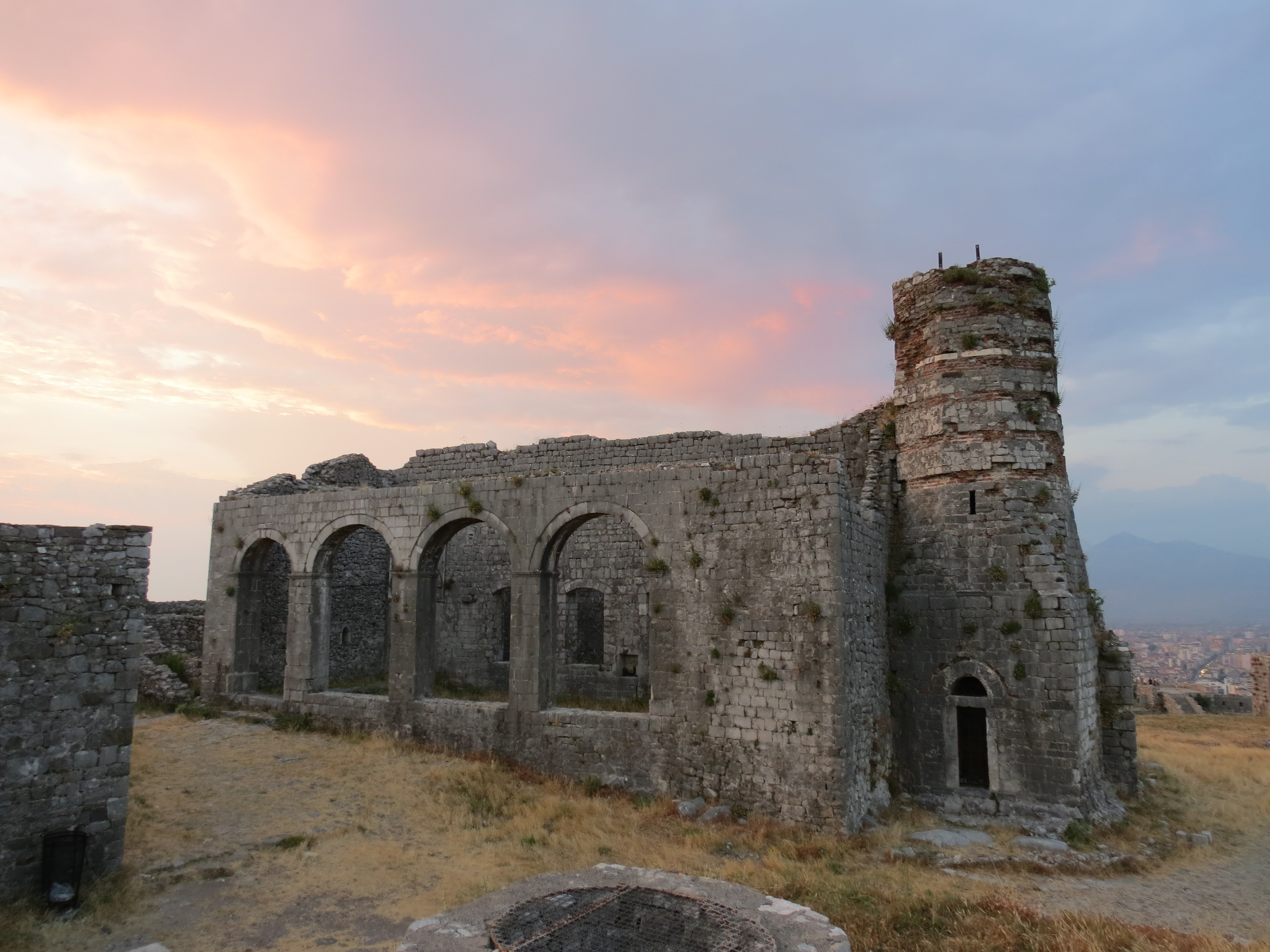
- Side view of the former church-mosque, with the minaret remnants, at right

- Location of the former mosque in Albania

Religion
- Affiliation: Roman Catholicism (former); Islam (former)
- Ecclesiastical or organizational status: Cathedral (1251–1685); Mosque (1685–1967)
- Governing body: Archdiocese of Shkodër-Pult (as a church)
- Status: Inactive (partial ruinous state)

Location
- Location: Shkodër
- Country: Albania
- Interactive map of: Fatih Sultan Mehmet Mosque; St Stephen's Cathedral in Rozafa
- Coordinates: 42°2′47″N 19°29′35″E

Architecture
- Type: Church
- Style: Ottoman architecture
- Completed: 1251 CE (as a church); 1685 CE (as a mosque)
- Destroyed: c. 1967
- Minaret: 1 (partial ruins)

The Fatih Sultan Mehmet Mosque (Albanian: Xhamia e Sulltan Mehmet Fatihut), also known as the St. Stephen's Cathedral of Shkodër in Rozafa (Albanian: Katedralja e Shën Shtjefnit në Rozafë, Latin: Ecclesia cathedralis Sancti Stephani de Scutaro), is a 13th-century former Roman Catholic cathedral and subsequently a former Islamic mosque, that was located within the Rozafa Castle near Shkodër, Albania. Partially destroyed in c. 1967, the structure is in a ruinous state.

== History ==
=== As a cathedral ===
The cathedral was built in the castle of Rozafa in the 13th century, and enlarged in the 14th and 15th centuries while being under Venice possession. In 1319 Don Andrea of Shkodër brought from Ragusa carpenters to assist in the renovation of the area of the church dedicated to the choir. Another renovation is mentioned in 1403 from the then captain general of Shkodër, who brought 5,000 tiles from Ragusa to use for the church's roof.

The construction typology is similar to that used in the Ratac Abbey in Montenegro, built later, as well as with a church in Šas. It had a cella, covered by roof, as well as an altar distinguished by crossed vaults. The altar had the only window of the church. There are architectural elements of both Dominican and Franciscan orders in the cathedral.

Close to the church was the bishop's house, which was documented since 1251. However, after the 1478-1479 Siege of Shkodra the bishop was not permitted to reside in the castle.

=== As a mosque ===
In 1685, the Ottomans transformed the church into a mosque. Most of the objects in the former church were removed, with the exception of the old organ that was kept as a 'war trophy'. The mosque was named in honour of Mehmet the Conqueror. A minaret was built on the southern side of the structure and within a niche of the altar, a mihrab was installed.

An khan (inn), called The Inn of Noka (Albanian: Hani i Nokës), seemed to have been built on the foundations of the former bishop's house and was extant until 1951.

In 1939, Giuseppe Valentini, an Italian priest and albanologist, suggested ways to restore the building as a church. A planned attempt to convert the mosque into its original use, with partial U.S. sponsorship, was disliked by the Muslim community of Shkodër. The U.S. Ambassador to Albania, Marcy Ries, promised to re-assess the funding of the project.

The ruins of this church-mosque feature a dikka, a mihrab, and the remains of a large minaret. The Fatih Sultan Mehmet Mosque is one of the few buildings from the Middle Ages in Shkodër and is the only mosque that partially survived in Shkodra during the Communist dictatorship of Enver Hoxha, who destroyed all 36 mosques in Shkodër.

== See also ==
- Roman Catholicism in Albania
- Islam in Albania
- List of mosques in Albania
