= Dimitrije Karaman =

Serbian poet and bard

Dimitrije Karaman (Lipova, Arad, c. 1500-Lipova, Arad, after 1555) was an early Serbian poet and bard.

The earliest known Serbian Guslar is referred to in 1551 by Hungarian historian Sebestyen Tinodi Lantos, who wrote in his Chronicles:

There are many gusle players here in Hungary, but none is better at the Serbian style than Dimitrije Karaman...

In addition, he describes the performance, explaining that the bard (guslar) is sitting and holding the gusle between his knees, breaks its cords in the highly emotional artistic performance, with a sad and dedicated expression on his face. Karaman did not confine himself to his gusle, but was also a soldier, and often took part in the battles against the Ottoman Turks of Suleiman the Magnificent who were then menacing Western Europe.

== See also ==
- Gusle
- Serbian epic poetry
- Filip Višnjić
- Tešan Podrugović
- Old Rashko
- Djuro Milutinović the Blind
