= Višnjićevo =

Višnjićevo Вишњићево (Serbian) Grk
- Village (Selo)
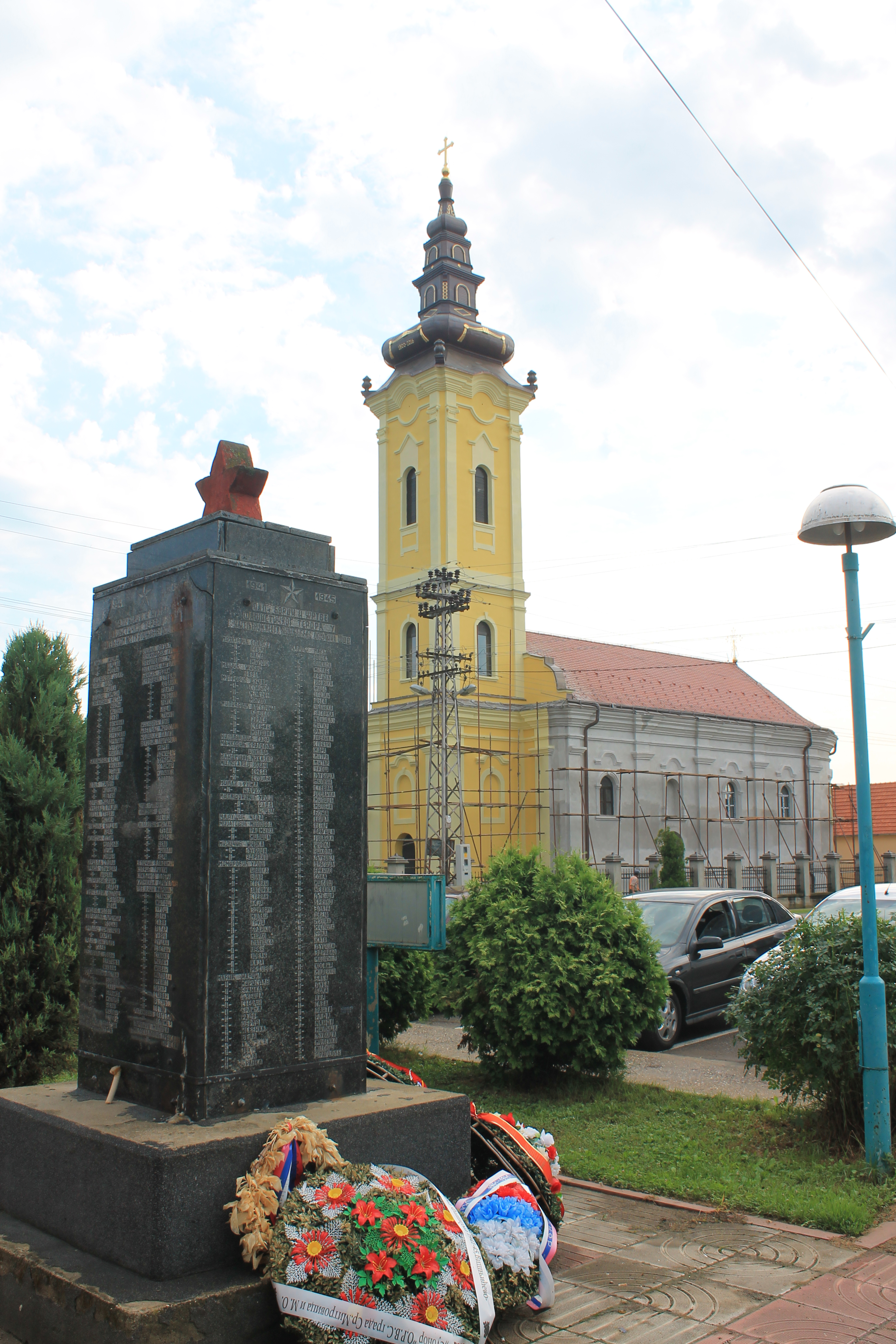

- Location within Vojvodina Location within Serbia Location within Europe
- Coordinates: 44°57′56″N 19°17′22″E
- Country: Serbia
- Province: Vojvodina
- Region: Syrmia
- District: Srem
- Municipality: Šid

Area
  - Total: 73.46 km^{2} (28.36 sq mi)

Population (2011)
  - Total: 1,683
  - Density: 22.91/km^{2} (59.34/sq mi)
- Time zone: UTC+1 (CET)
  - Summer (DST): UTC+2 (CEST)

Višnjićevo (Serbian Cyrillic: Вишњићево), formerly Grk (Serbian Cyrillic: Грк), is a village located in the municipality of Šid, Serbia. As of 2011 census, it has a population of 1,683 inhabitants.

== Name ==
Grk was renamed after World War I to honour Filip Višnjić, who is buried in the village.

== See also ==
- List of places in Serbia
- List of cities, towns and villages in Vojvodina
