= Slavic antithesis =

Stylistic device used in epic poetry

The Slavic antithesis is a stylistic device used in Serbian, Croatian, Bosnian, Montenegrin, and Macedonian epic poetry.

Usually placed at the beginning of the poem, the device delays narrative climax to build suspense and maximise the psychological impact of the final revelation.

Slavic antithesis follows a strict three-part formula:

1. The question: The poet proposes several logical or poetic possibilities to explain a visual scene or mystery.
2. The Negation: The poet methodically rejects all of the proposed possibilities.
3. The Reveal: The poet finally delivers the actual, real explanation, which is completely different from the initial guesses.

The first two parts of the Slavic antithesis are usually similar, while the last verse (the explanation) differs. Many poems use the same descriptive lines while only changing the last line.

== Example ==
This is an example of the Slavic antithesis from the beginning of the ballad "Hasanaginica":

Šta se bijeli u gori zelenoj?
Al' su snijezi, al' su labudovi.
Da su snijezi, već bi okopnili,
Labudovi već bi odletjeli.
Nit' su snijezi, nit su labudovi,
Nego šator age Hasan-age.

Translation:

What gleams white in the green forrest?
Is it snow, or is it swans?
If it were snow, it would have melted,
If it were swans, they would have flown away.
It's neither snow, nor is it swans.
It is the (military) tent of Hasan-aga.

The final line is explanatory and supported by the previous descriptive lines, which give it impact on the audience.

The Slavic Antithesis is also exemplified by one of western pop culture's most iconic lines: "Is it a bird? Is it a plane? No...It's SUPERMAN!"

== See also ==
- Serbian epic poetry
