= The Falcon (film) =

- Directed by: Vatroslav Mimica
- Written by: Aleksandar Petrović (screenplay), Vatroslav Mimica (screenplay)
- Produced by: Rüdiger von Hirschberg
- Music by: Alfi Kabiljo
- Distributed by: Soundfilm München (1982)
- Release date: 30 March 1983 (West Germany)
- Countries: Yugoslavia, Germany
- Language: Serbo-Croatian

Banović Strahinja (Serbian Cyrillic: Бановић Страхиња, released internationally as The Falcon) is a 1981 Yugoslavian-German adventure film written and directed by Vatroslav Mimica based on Strahinja Banović, a hero of Serbian epic poetry. It entered the section "Officina Veneziana" at the 38th Venice International Film Festival.

== Plot ==
During the late 14th century Serbia becomes the target of the Ottoman Empire. The year is 1388 and Turkish bandits roam freely throughout southern Serbia. While the majority of Serbian knights is concentrated around the city of Kruševac, the capital of Serbia at the time, the southern borders are partially left undefended. It is not until the following year of 1389 when it will come to a total clash of two armies.

While the respected Serbian noble Strahinja Banović is out hunting, a Turkish renegade gang burns his castle, kills all of his servants, and takes his young wife. Strahinja begins a long quest to rescue his wife despite everybody else's doubts in her fidelity. Strahinja gathers a posse of scoundrels and goes after the bandits. In the meantime, the Turkish bandit Alija tries to seduce Strahinja's wife Anđa, but she refuses him. However, over a period of time she begins to weaken.

== Cast ==
- Franco Nero as Banović Strahinja
- Gert Fröbe as Jug Bogdan
- Dragan Nikolić as Alija
- Sanja Vejnović as Anđa
- Rade Šerbedžija as Abdulah
- Kole Angelovski as Timotije
- Stole Aranđelović as Pop Gradislav
- Neda Spasojević as Luda
- Janez Vrhovec as Vladika
- Rados Bajic as Boško Jugović
