= Đuro Milutinović =

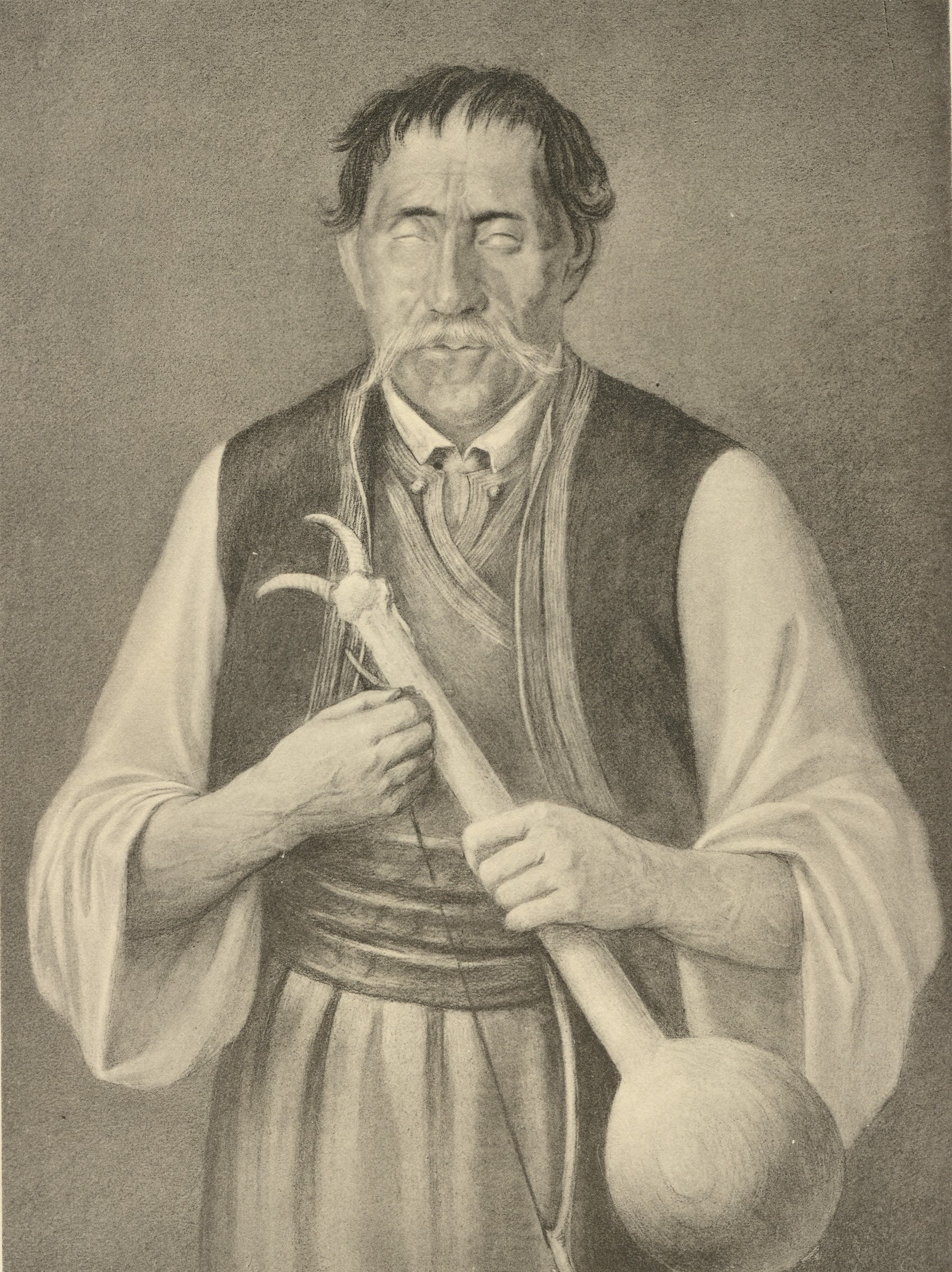

Background information
- Born: 1774; Grahovo, Nikšić
- Died: September 9, 1844 (aged 69–70)
- Instrument: Gusle

Đorđe Milutinović (Serbian: Ђорђе Милутиновић, 1774–1844), known as Đuro Crnogorac, was a blind guslar (Gusle player, epic poet) and trusted messenger of military plans and diplomatic secrets during the preparation and eve of the First Serbian Uprising.

== Biography ==
Milutinović was born in 1774 in Grahovo, Nikšić. He lost his eyesight at his age of sixteen or seventeen, and from then on he began to compose epic songs of current events on the gusle. At the time of the preparation of the First Serbian Uprising, he served as an interlocutor among the institutions in Revolutionary Serbia and the Prince-Bishopric of Montenegro.

During 1813, Đuro was in close contact with revolutionary leader Karađorđe. After the fall of the First Serbian Uprising, and the invasion of Serbia by the Ottomans, many refugees were taken from the borders of Serbian lands to be colonized on the large estates of the Serbian gentry in exile in Wallachia, Moldavia, Bessarabia and Imperial Russia. He first went to Graz and then to Bessarabia, with most Serbian emigrants. There, in 1816, he was instrumental in rejecting an offer to settle Serbs en masse permanently in the Dniester Canyon as immigrants. While in the territories now known as Romania, he and other bards brought their songs together to become part of the Liberation cycle of Serbian epic poetry.

In 1817, he returned to Serbia, where he was seen and valued guest in Prince Miloš Obrenović's Palace, and lived until his death on September 9, 1844.

== See also ==
- Serbian epic poetry
- Filip Višnjić
- Tešan Podrugović
- Old Rashko
- Živana Antonijević
- Old Man Milija
