= The Building of Skadar =

Poem in cycle of Serbian epic poetry

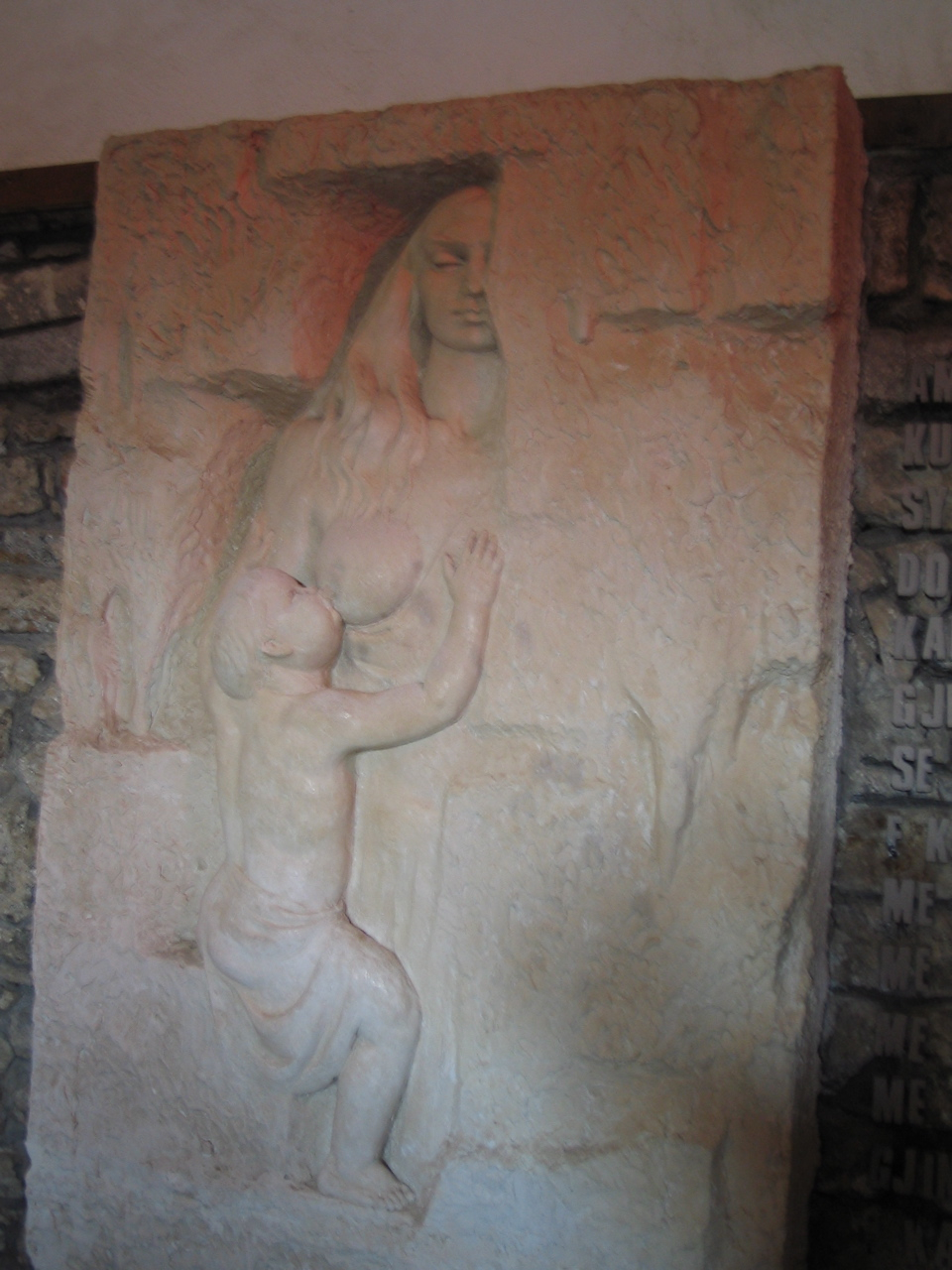
Life sized sculpture of half-immured women, the Rozafa Castle museum

The Building of Skadar or The Walling of the Skadar or The Founding of Skadar (Serbian: Зидање Скадра) is a poem of the pre-Kosovo cycle of Serbian epic poetry. It is based on the motif of human sacrifice.

== Time and place ==
The events described in the poem allegedly occurred at the beginning of the 14th century. Jovan Tomić concluded that this song was created in the region near Skadar (now Shkodër), such as upper Albania, Montenegro, or the southeast part of Herzegovina where the tradition of the Mrnjavčević family was strong. His conclusion was later supported by other scholars. The army led by King Vukašin Mrnjavčević and his son Prince Marko came under Skadar in June 1371, but when they were informed about a large Ottoman army advancing from the east they headed east to prepare for the Battle of Maritsa. The same motif is described in poetry composed in some other languages. The version of the song in the Serbian language recorded by Vuk Karadžić is the oldest collected version of the legend, and the first one which earned literary fame.

There have been documented versions of the story in Serbia, Romania, Greece, Albania, Georgia and Armenia, with researchers collecting hundreds of versions in all these countries.

== Publishing and initial reactions ==
This song was published for the first time in 1815 in a version recorded by Vuk Karadžić from the singing of a Herzegovinian storyteller named Old Rashko. In 1824, Vuk Karadžić sent a copy of his folksong collection to Jacob Grimm, who was particularly enthralled by The Building of Skadar. Grimm translated it into German, and described it as "one of the most touching poems of all nations and all times". Johann Wolfgang von Goethe published the German translation, but did not share Grimm's opinion because he found the poem's spirit "superstitiously barbaric".

== Plot ==
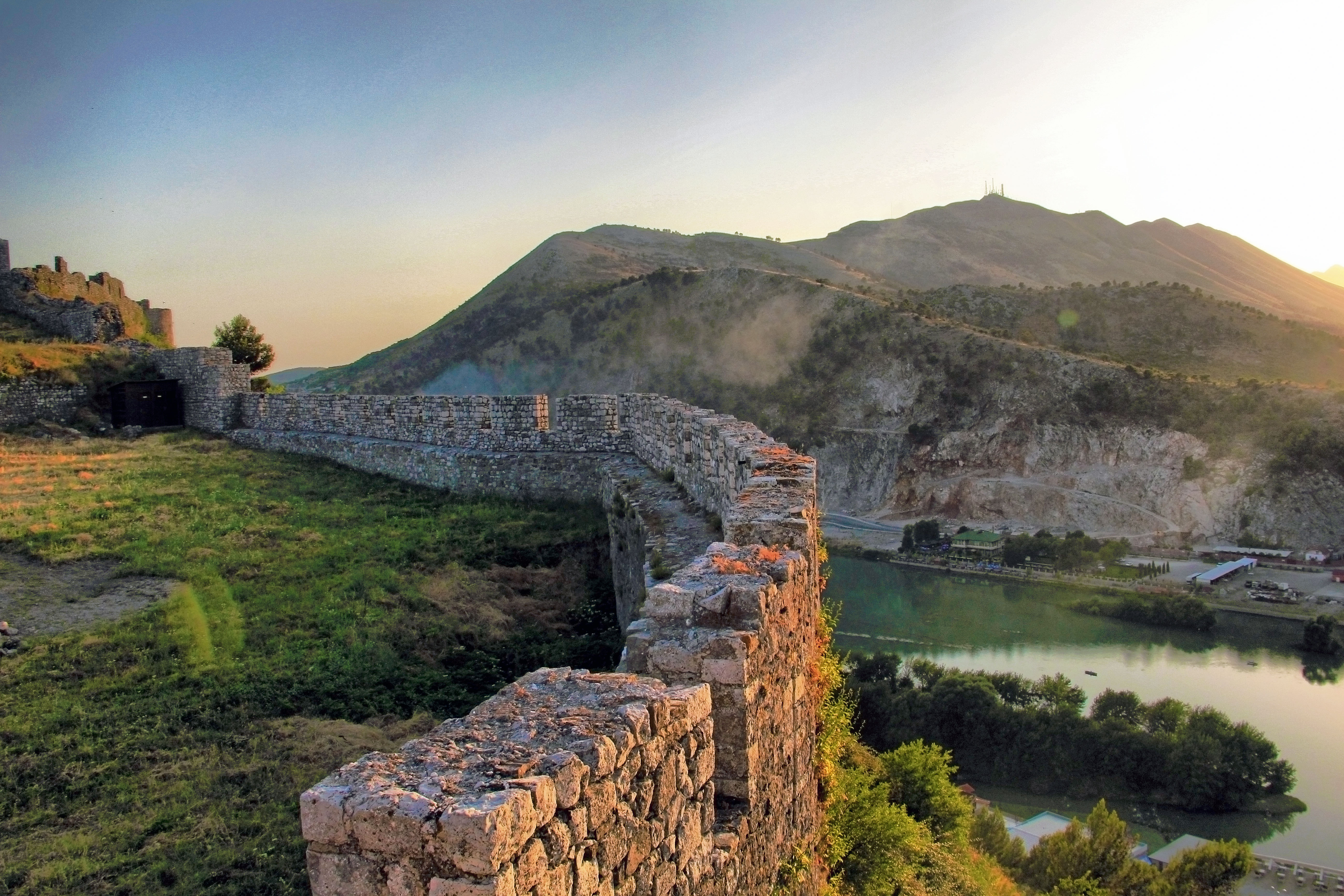
The castle in Shkodër (Skadar) and Bojana river

The song describes the building of a fortress on the Bojana river at Skadar by the Mrnjavčević brothers (Vukašin, Uglješa and Gojko Mrnjavčević). Gojko had to wall up his young wife alive within the walls of the fortress as a sacrifice demanded by the mountain vila (a fairy similar to a nymph, in Slavic mythology). According to Vuk Karadžić, there was a belief at this time that it was impossible to build a large building without a human sacrifice. Vuk claims that people even avoided the building sites because they were afraid their shadow could be walled-up and they could die without it.

== See also ==
- Serbian epic poetry
- Gusle
- Bridge of Arta
