= Old Rashko =

- Born: Рашко Колашинац c. 1770; Old Herzegovina, Ottoman Empire
- Died: 1822
- Other names: Old man Raško
- Citizenship: Ottoman, Serbian
- Occupations: a Serbian storyteller and gusle player (guslar)

Old Rashko or Old man Raško (Serbian: Старац Рашко; Старац Рашко Колашинац) was a Serbian storyteller and gusle player (guslar) known as one of the most important sources of the epic poetry recorded by Vuk Karadžić.

== Biography ==
Rashko was born c. 1770 in the region of Old Herzegovina, like Tešan Podrugović, but later moved to Kolašin. According to some theories, he was probably a brother of Marko, the grandfather of Svetozar Marković. At the beginning of the First Serbian Uprising, Rashko came to the village of Sabanta in the Jagodina nahiyah. He participated in the First Serbian Uprising and distinguished himself in the Battle of Lipar (1804), in which he raised the revolutionary flag, and the Battle of Deligrad (1806).

== Songs ==
Old Rashko was illiterate. Based on his singing, Vuk Karadžić recorded some of the best poems with motifs derived from medieval Serbian history, like The Building of Skadar or Uroš and the Sons of Marnyava. Jacob Grimm was particularly enthralled by The Building of Skadar and described it as "one of the most touching poems of all nations and all times". He was also the source of the songs Four Uskoks, The Building of Ravanica and The Maiden Margita and Duke Rajko. Vuk Karadžić stated that the song Battle of Deligrad was probably authored by Rashko himself. Vuk Karadžić also recorded another version of the song The Marriage of King Vukašin from Rashko, but it was not published as he probably considered it worse than the other versions. In a letter Vuk wrote to Miloš Obrenović he stated that he failed to record two beautiful songs from Rashko's singing: The Wedding of Ivo Senjanin and Three Prisoners. Miloš knew Raško personally, otherwise Vuk would not write about him in such manner.

Vuk classified Rashko's songs into songs from Herzegovina, and this classification caused polemics between Svetozar Matić who believed that his songs were originally from Srem, although Raško had actually never visited Srem, and some other scholars who confirmed Vuk's opinion.

In his songs Rashko paid much attention to ethics, being almost obsessed with righteousness, loyalty, and disloyalty.

Vuk Karadžić recorded and published ten songs from Rashko's singing.

- The Building of Skadar (Зидање Скадра)
- The Building of Ravanica (Зидање Раванице)
- The Death of Dušan
- The Emperor Suleyman and Savo Patriarch
- Uroš and the Sons of Marnyava (Урош и Мрњавчевићи)
- Four Uskoks (Четири ускока)
- Battle of Deligrad - probably authored by Rashko
- The Maiden Margita and Duke Rajko (Маргита девојка и Рајко Војвода)
- The Wedding of Prince Lazar
- The Wedding of Grujica Novaković
- The Marriage of King Vukašin - recorded but not published version

== See also ==
- List of Serbian Revolutionaries
- Dimitrije Karaman
- Živana Antonijević
- Filip Višnjić
- Tešan Podrugović
- Petar Perunović
- Djuro Milutinović the Blind
- Marko Utvić
- Blind Jeca (Jelisaveta Marković, called "Blind Jeca," was Živana's pupil)
- Stepanija
