= Mali Radojica =

Serbian hajduk

Mali Radojica (Serbian: Мали Радојица, English: Little Radojica) is a Serbian hajduk and Serb epic poem of the same name. The poem follows his life surviving torture by the Turks in an Ottoman prison, later successfully escaping with the help of a Turkish girl who is in love with him and getting revenge on Bećir-aga and his wife. The song belongs to the Hajduk-Uskok cycle.

An English translation of the Serbian version appears in the journal Mostovi, 22:2 (1991) pp 22–25, transl. Adam Brooke Davis, Lee Edgar Tyler and Sarah Feeny.

== Albanian Epic Poetry ==
An almost identical song is found in part of the Albanian epic poetry which was composed on the basis of poetry of Muslims from Bosnia.
