= Serbian epic poetry =

Form of epic poetry

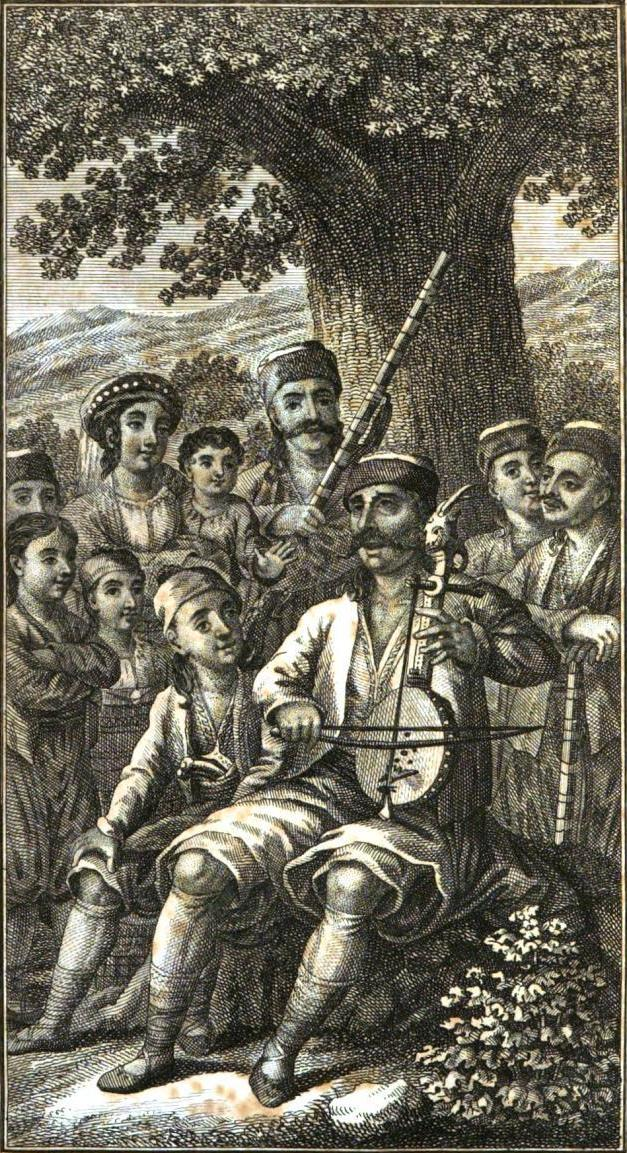
A Serb sings to the gusle (drawing from 1823). Serbian epic poems were often sung to the accompaniment of this traditional bowed string instrument.

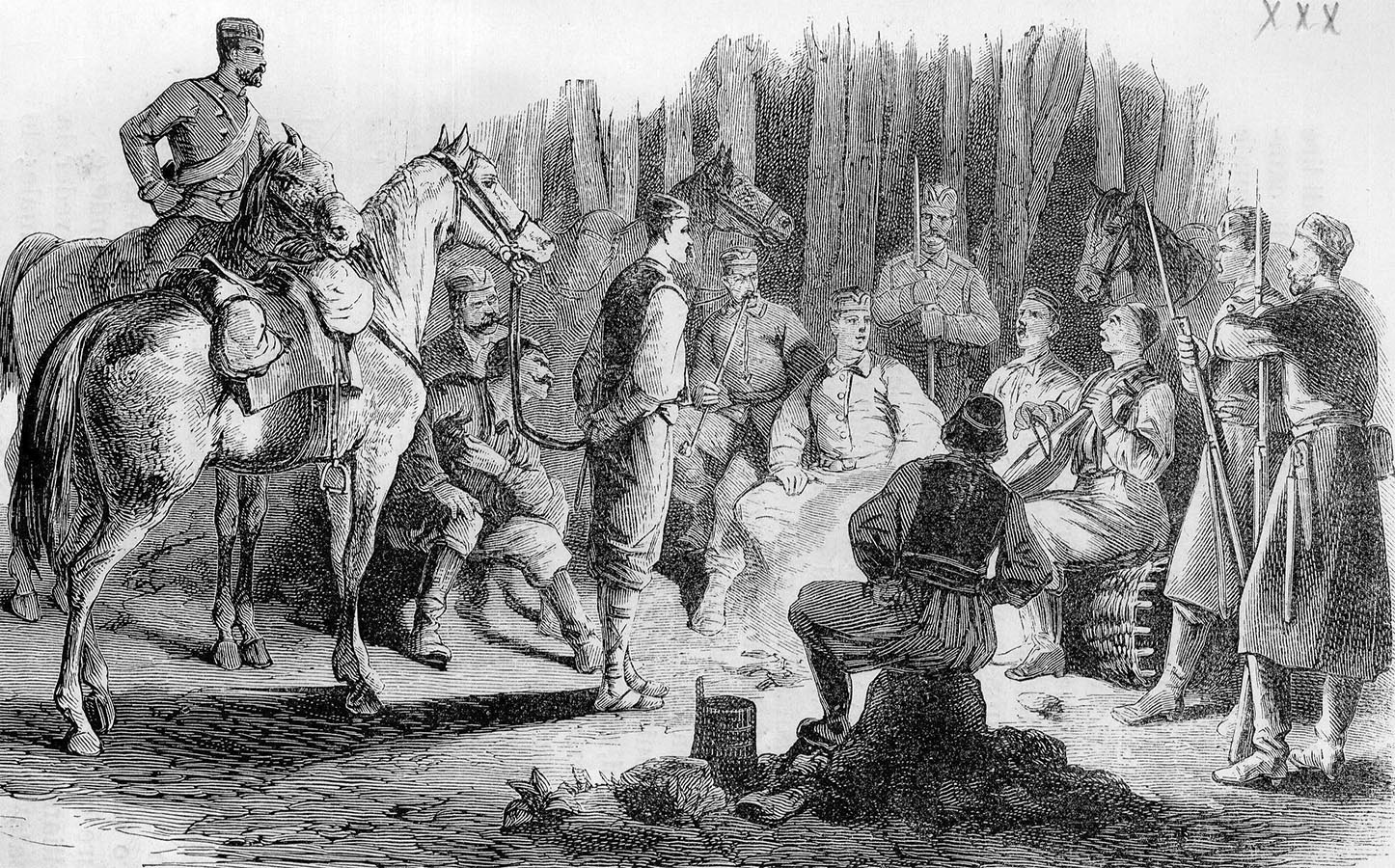
Guslar singing of the death of Lazar, at an encampent in Javor, during the Serbian–Ottoman War (1876–78).

Serbian epic poetry (Serbian: Српске епске народне песме, romanized: Srpske epske narodne pesme) is a form of epic poetry created by Serbs originating in today's Serbia, Bosnia and Herzegovina, Croatia, Montenegro and North Macedonia. The main cycles were composed by unknown Serb authors between the 14th and 19th centuries. They are largely concerned with historical events and personages. The instrument accompanying the epic poetry is the gusle.

Serbian epic poetry helped in developing the Serbian national consciousness. The cycles of Prince Marko, hajduks and Uskoks inspired the Serbs to restore their freedom and heroic past. The hajduks in particular are seen as an integral part of national identity; in stories, the hajduks were heroes: they played the role of the Serbian elite during Ottoman rule, they defended the Serbs against Ottoman oppression, and paved the way for the national liberation.

== History ==
The earliest surviving record of an epic poem related to Serbian epic poetry is a ten verse fragment of a bugarštica song from 1497 in Southern Italy about the imprisonment of Sibinjanin Janko (John Hunyadi) by Đurađ Branković, however the regional origin and ethnic identity of its Slavic performers remains a matter of scholarly dispute. From at least the Ottoman period up until the present day, Serbian epic poetry was sung accompanied by the gusle and there are historical references to Serb performers playing the gusle at the Polish–Lithuanian royal courts in the 16th and 17th centuries, and later on in Ukraine and Hungary. Hungarian historian Sebestyén Tinódi wrote in 1554 that "there are many gusle players here in Hungary, but none is better at the Serbian style than Dimitrije Karaman", and described Karaman's performance to Turkish lord Uluman in 1551 in Lipova: the guslar would hold the gusle between his knees and go into a highly emotional artistic performance with a sad and dedicated expression on his face. Chronicler and poet Maciej Stryjkowski (1547–1582) included a verse mentions the Serbs singing heroic songs about ancestors fighting the Turks in his 1582 chronicle. Józef Bartłomiej Zimorowic used the phrase "to sing to the Serbian gusle" in his 1663 idyll Śpiewacy (Singers).

In 1824, Vuk Karadžić sent a copy of his folksong collection to Jacob Grimm, who was particularly enthralled by The Building of Skadar. Grimm translated it into German, and described it as "one of the most touching poems of all nations and all times".

Many of the epics are about the era of the Ottoman occupation of Serbia and the struggle for the liberation. With the efforts of ethnographer Vuk Karadžić, many of these epics and folk tales were collected and published in books in the first half of the 19th century. Up until that time, these poems and songs had been almost exclusively an oral tradition, transmitted by bards and singers. Among the books Karadžić published were:

- A Small Simple-Folk Slavonic-Serbian Songbook, 1814; Serbian Folk Song-Book (Vols, I-IV, Leipzig edition, 1823–1833; Vols. I-IV, Vienna edition, 1841–1862)
- Serbian Folk Tales (1821, with 166 riddles; and 1853)
- Serbian Folk Proverbs and Other Common Expressions, 1834.
- "Women's Songs" from Herzegovina (1866) - which was collected by Karadžić's collaborator and assistant Vuk Vrčević

These editions appeared in Europe when romanticism was in full bloom and there was much interest in Serbian folk poetry, including from Johann Gottfried Herder, Jacob Grimm, Goethe and Jernej Kopitar.

== Gusle ==
The gusle (гусле) instrumentally accompanies heroic songs (epic poetry) in the Balkans. The instrument is held vertically between the knees, with the left hand fingers on the neck. The strings are never pressed to the neck, giving a harmonic and unique sound. There is no consensus about the origin of the instrument, while some researchers believe it was brought with the Slavs to the Balkans, based on a 6th-century Byzantine source. Teodosije the Hilandarian (1246–1328) wrote that Stefan Nemanjić (r. 1196–1228) often entertained the Serbian nobility with musicians with drums and "gusle". Reliable written records about the gusle appear only in the 15th century. 16th-century travel memoirs mention the instrument in Bosnia and Serbia.

It is known that Serbs sang to the gusle during the Ottoman period. Notable Serbian performers played at the Polish royal courts in the 16th- and 17th centuries, and later on in Ukraine and in Hungary. There is an old mention in Serbo-Croatian literature that a Serbian guslar was present at the court of Władysław II Jagiełło in 1415. In a poem published in 1612, Kasper Miaskowski wrote that "the Serbian gusle and gaidas will overwhelm Shrove Tuesday". Józef Bartłomiej Zimorowic used the phrase "to sing to the Serbian gusle" in his 1663 idyll Śpiewacy ("Singers").

== Corpus ==
The corpus of Serbian epic poetry is divided into cycles:

- Non-historic cycle (Неисторијски циклус/Neistorijski ciklus) - poems about Slavic mythology, characteristically about dragons and nymphs
- Pre-Kosovo cycle (Преткосовски циклус/Pretkosovski ciklus) - poems about events that predate the Battle of Kosovo (1389)
- Kosovo cycle (Косовски циклус/Kosovski ciklus) - poems about events that happened just before and after the Battle of Kosovo
- Post-Kosovo cycle (Покосовски циклус/Pokosovski ciklus) - poems about post-Battle events
- Cycle of Kraljević Marko (Циклус Краљевића Марка/Ciklus Kraljevića Marka)
- Cycle of hajduks and Uskoks (Хајдучки и ускочки циклус, Хајдучке и ускочке песме) – poems about brigands and rebels
- Poems about the liberation of Serbia and Montenegro (циклус ослобођења Србије, Песме о ослобођењу Србије и Црне Горе) - poems about the 19th-century battles against the Ottomans
- Unsorted (Неразврстане/Nerazvrstane) – poems that do not belong to any of the cycles mentioned above

Poems depict historical events with varying degrees of accuracy.

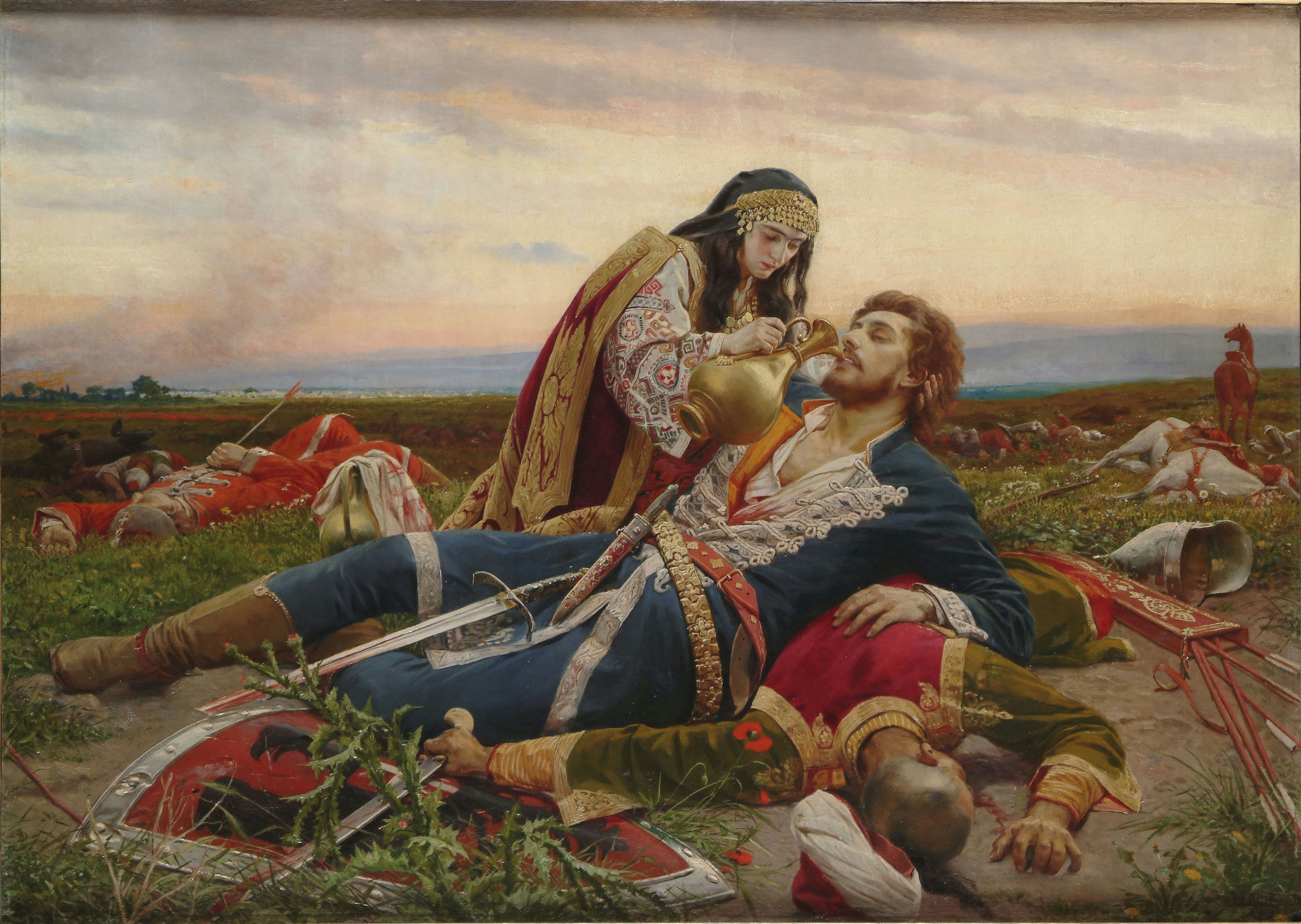
Kosovo Maiden by Uroš Predić Dying Pavle Orlović is given water by a maiden who seeks her fiancé; he tells her that her love, Milan, and his two blood-brothers Miloš and Ivan are dead. —taken from the Serb epic poem

== Notable people ==
- Benedikt Kuripečič (16th century), diplomat who traveled through Ottoman Bosnia and Serbia in 1530 and recorded that epic songs about Miloš Obilić are popular not only among Serbs in Kosovo but also in Bosnia and Croatia. He also recorded some legends about the Battle of Kosovo.
- Dimitrije Karaman (fl. 1551), oldest known Serbian gusle player
- Avram Miletić (1755–after 1826), merchant and songwriter best known for writing the earliest collection of urban lyric poetry in Serbian.
- Old Rashko, one of the most important sources of epic poetry recorded by Vuk Karadžić.
- Filip Višnjić (1767–1834), Serbian guslar dubbed the "Serbian Homer" both for his blindness and poetic gift.
- Tešan Podrugović (1783–1815), Serb hajduk, storyteller and guslar who participated in the First Serbian Uprising and was one of the most important sources for Serbian epic poetry.
- Živana Antonijević (d. 1822), known as "Blind Živana", one of the favorite female singers of Vuk Karadžić.
- Vuk Karadžić (1787–1864) was a Serbian philologist and linguist who was the major reformer of the Serbian language. He deserves, perhaps, for his collections of songs, fairy tales, and riddles to be called the father of the study of Serbian folklore.
- Vuk Vrčević (1811–1882), collector of lyric poetry
- Petar Perunović (1880–1952), known as "Perun", famous guslar who performed for Nikola Tesla and the first to record Serbian epic poetry in a studio.
- Đuro Milutinović the Blind (1774–1844), guslar at the Serbian court.

== Characters ==
Medieval era

- Tsar Dušan, Emperor, historical figure
- Hrelja (Relja krilati, "Relja the Winged"), historical figure
- Prince Lazar, Prince and legendary Emperor, historical figure
- Jug Bogdan, based on historical figure Vratko Nemanjić (fl. 1325–1355)
- Miloš Vojinović, knight in Pre-Kosovo cycle, historical figure
- Strahinja Banović, knight in Pre-Kosovo cycle, based on historical figure Đurađ II Stracimirović Balšić
- Pavle Orlović, knight at Kosovo, legendary figure
- Milan Toplica, knight at Kosovo, legendary figure
- Ivan Kosančić, knight at Kosovo, legendary figure
- Mihajlo Svilojević, knight at Kosovo, partly based on historical figure Michael Szilágyi (1400–1460)
- Jugović brothers, including Boško Jugović, knights, sons of Jug Bogdan, legendary figures
- Konstantin Dragaš (Beg Kostadin), historical figure
- Prijezda, vojvoda
- "Zmaj Ognjeni Vuk" (Vuk the Fiery Dragon), based on Vuk Grgurević, the Serbian Despot (r. 1471–85)
- Ailing Dojčin, possibly based on despots John VII Palaiologos and Andronikos Palaiologos
- Pop Milo Jovović
- Stari Vujadin
- Sibinjanin Janko, based on historical figure John Hunyadi
- Petar Doci (Petar Dojčin), historical figure
- Starina Novak (partly)
- Musa Kesedžija, enemy of Kraljević Marko, legendary figure based on several characters
- Alil-Aga, enemy of Kraljević Marko, legendary figure
- Djemo the Mountaineer, enemy of Kraljević Marko, legendary figure
- General Vuča, enemy of Kraljević Marko, legendary figure
- Philip the Magyar, enemy of Kraljević Marko, based on historical figure Italian-Hungarian general Pipo of Ozora
- Manojlo Grčić, legendary figure, partly based on historical figure Manuel I Komnenos
- Maksim Crnojević, legendary figure, based on historical figure Skenderbeg Crnojević

Hajduks and uskoks cycle

- Mali Radojica, hajduk
- Deli Radivoje, hajduk
- Bajo Pivljanin, hajduk in Venetian service, historical figure
- Grujica Žeravica, hajduk in Venetian service, historical figure
- Janko Mitrović (Janko od Kotara), uskok in Venetian service, historical figure
- Ognjen Hadzovic, hajduk, main character in Ženidba Hadzovic Ognjena.
- Srbin Tukelija, hajduk, main character in Boj Arađana s Komadincima.

Some heroes are paired with their horses, such as Prince Marko—Šarac, Vojvoda Momčilo—Jabučilo (a winged horse), Miloš Obilić—Ždralin, Damjan Jugović—Zelenko, Banović Strahinja—Đogin, Hajduk-Veljko—Kušlja, Jovan Kursula—Strina, Srđa Zlopogleđa—Vranac.

== Excerpts ==
- Slavic antithesis:

There two pines were growing together,
and among them one thin-topped fir;
neither there were just some two green pines
nor among them one thin-topped fir,
but those two were just some two born brothers
one is Pavle, other is Radule
and among them little sis' Jelena.

- (Kraljević Marko speaks: )

"I'm afraid that there will be a brawl.
And if really there will be a brawl,
Woe to one who is next to Marko!"

"Thou dear hand, oh thou my fair green apple,
Where didst blossom? Where has fate now plucked thee?
Woe is me! thou blossomed on my bosom,
Thou wast plucked, alas, upon Kosovo!"

"Oh my bird, oh my dear grey falcon,
How do you feel with your wing torn out?"
"I am feeling with my wing torn out
Like a brother one without the other."

Modern example of Serbian epics as recorded in 1992 by film director Paweł Pawlikowski in a documentary for the BBC Serbian epics; an anonymous gusle singer compares Radovan Karadžić, as he prepares to depart for Geneva for peace talk, to Karađorđe, who had led the First Serbian Uprising against the Turks in 1804:

"Hey, Radovan, you man of steel!
The greatest leader since Karađorđe!
Defend our freedom and our faith,
On the shores of Lake Geneva."

== Quotes ==
- The ballads of Serbia occupy a high position, perhaps the highest position, in the ballad literature of Europe. They would, if well known, astonish Europe... In them breathes a clear and inborn poetry such as can scarcely be found among any other modern people.
  Jacob Grimm
- Everyone in the West who has known these poems has proclaimed them to be literature of the highest order which ought to be known better.
  Charles Simic

== Modern Serbian epic poetry ==
Epic poetry is recorded still today. Some modern songs are published in books or recorded, and under copyright, but some are in public domain, and modified by subsequent authors just like old ones. There are new songs that mimic old epic poetry, but are humorous and not epic in nature; these are also circulating around with no known author. In 1881, Elodie Lawton reported that for the amusement of his listeners, a member of the National Assembly of Serbia from Ripanj named Anta Neshich (Note: Serbian: Анта Нешић, romanized: Anta Nešić) would recount debates over a monetary reform bill in the style of epic poetry. Modern epic heroes include: Slobodan Milošević, Radovan Karadžić, Milan Martić, Ratko Mladić and Vojislav Šešelj. Topics include: Yugoslav wars, NATO bombing of Yugoslavia, and the Hague Tribunal.

Popular modern Serbian epic performers, guslari (Guslars) include: Milomir "Miljan" Miljanić, Đoko Koprivica, Boško Vujačić, Vlastimir Barać, Sava Stanišić, Miloš Šegrt, Saša Laketić and Milan Mrdović.

== See also ==
- Gusle
- Bugarštica
- Erlangen Manuscript
- List of national poetries
- The Building of Skadar
- Serbian literature

== Sources ==
- Bjeladinović-Jergić, Jasna (2001). Зборник Етнографског музеја у Београду: 1901-2001. Етнографски музеј. pp. 489–. ISBN 9788678910081.
- Dragnich, Alex N. (1994). Serbia's Historical Heritage. East European Monographs. ISBN 978-0-88033-244-6.
- Georgijević, Krešimir (2003) [1936]. "Српскохрватска народна песма у пољској књижевности: Студија из упоредне историје словенских књижевности". Belgrade: Rastko; Српска краљевска академија.
- Karadžić, Vuk S. (1833). Narodne srpske pjesme. Vol. 4. Vienna: štamparija Jermenskog manastira.
- Ling, Jan (1997). "Narrative Song in the Balkans". A History of European Folk Music. University Rochester Press. pp. 86–90. ISBN 978-1-878822-77-2.
- Milošević-Đorđević, Nada (1995). "The oral tradition". The history of Serbian Culture. Rastko.
- Petrović, Sonja (2008). "Oral and Written Art Forms in Serbian Medieval Literature". In Mundal, Else; Wellendorf, Jonas (eds.). Oral Art Forms and Their Passage Into Writing. Museum Tusculanum Press. pp. 85–108. ISBN 978-87-635-0504-8.
- Popović, Tatyana (1988). Prince Marko: The Hero of South Slavic Epics. New York: Syracuse University Press. ISBN 9780815624448.
- Vlahović, Petar (2004). Serbia: the country, people, life, customs. Ethnographic Museum. ISBN 978-86-7891-031-9.
