= Strahinja Banović =

Serbian noble

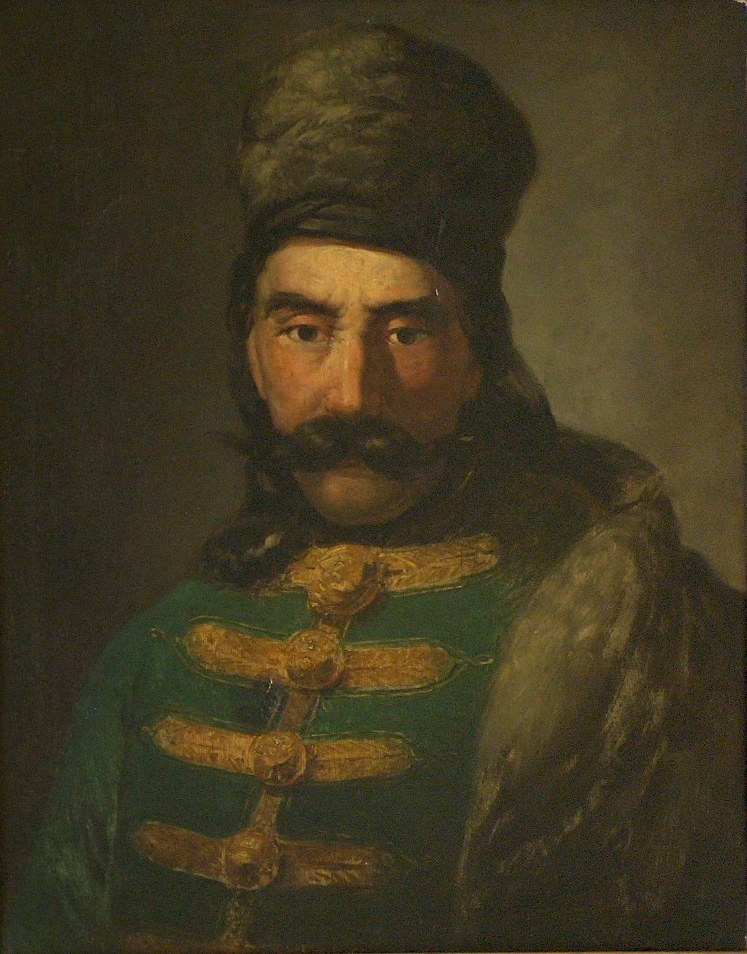
Đura Jakšić - Strahinjić Ban, 1862

Strahinja Banović (Serbian Cyrillic: Страхиња Бановић; died 15 June 1389 according to tradition) or Strahinjić Ban is a legendary vitez ("knight"), the main character of a Serbian epic poem of the same title. It is unsure whether or not he existed; however, some historians believe he was in fact Đurađ II Balšić of Zeta, whose grandfather-in-law was Vratko Nemanjić (Jug Bogdan in epic poetry).

== Poem ==
The poem starts with mentioning that Strahinja ruled Banjska near Kosovo (Banjska kraj Kosova), prior to the Battle of Kosovo (1389). His wife Anđelija, daughter of nobleman Jug Bogdan, gets kidnapped by bashi-bazouk Vlah Alija after Turks ravage the absent Strahinja's fortress. Strahinja asks Jug Bogdan if he and Anđelija's brothers (the Jugović brothers) could help him rescue her, but Jug Bogdan refuses, presuming that Anđelija has slept with the kidnapper, which is a great shame to the family. On his own, Strahinja searches for Anđelija in the fictional Goleč mountain, where Vlah Alija is stationed. Strahinja finally finds them, but Anđelija openly betrays him for Vlah Alija. Strahinja slices Vlah Alija's throat with his teeth, as a wolf would kill a sheep and returns to his father-in-law's estate with his wife where her brothers wait to kill her. Strahinja steps in front and tells them that he had forgiven his wife.

The greatest significance of the song is in the contrasts that arise between traditional and human: Representatives of traditional morality in the poem are members of the Jugović family (brothers and father of the abducted Andjelija), while Strahinja is a figure that goes beyond the limits of the laid down norms and relies only on his own humanity. Whether the adultery was intentionally committed or the woman was abducted and raped, the penalty for the adulteress has traditionally been death. Banović Strahinja condemns the inhumanity and primitiveness of such understanding, and shows a deep knowledge of the human psyche seeing that his wife has betrayed him not because of the love of the kidnapper, but out of fear for her own life, knowing the traditional punishment.

== Other poems ==
Other poems of the Kosovo Cycle also mention Strahinja, such as "Three Good Heroes" and "Tsar Lazar and Tsaritsa Milica", the latter of which mentions that he supposedly died in the Battle of Kosovo. The epic poem described above, eponymously titled "Banović Strahinja", is not the oldest poem about him; an older version exists in the tradition of bugarštica, entitled "When Strahinja Banović's wife betrayed him, and when therefore her brothers killed her". As can be inferred from the title, this earlier version of the poem ends differently, with the Jugovići stabbing Strahinja's wife to death.

== Identification with Đurađ II Balšić ==
Some historians believe he was based on Đurađ II Balšić (Stracimirović) of Zeta, whose grandfather-in-law was Vratko Nemanjić (Jug Bogdan in epic poetry).

- The names Strahinja and Stracimirović have the same root base.
- In the poem, it says Strahinja goes to Kruševac, the then capital of Knez Lazar's realm, to speak to Jug Bogdan.
- Jug Bogdan (Prince Vratko) was the grandfather-in-law to Đurađ Stracimirović, in Serbian language there is no specific word for grandfather-in-law, thus he would still be referred the same way as in the poem tast.
- The poem mentions Strahinja ruling a land next to Kosovo (Kraj Kosova). Stracimirović's Zeta Principality was located directly adjacent to the Kosovo region.
- During the events of the poem, Đurađ Stracimirović was in cooperation with Turkish legions attacking Vlatko Vuković's realm. This would explain why Strahinja had Turkish marauders unnoticed in his Principality.
- Strahinja's wife, Anđelija, is perceived as unfaithful in the poem for falling in love with her Turkish captor. Jelena, Stracimirović's wife, was also seen as unfaithful, remarrying to Sandalj Hranić after Stracimirović's death.
- Banović is a Serbian title meaning Son of a Ban, or Young Ban - 'Ban' being a South Slavic medieval title equivalent to a lord or duke, but also viceroy in a specific context, particularly in the Kosovo mythos, where Strahinja is represented as the second most important political persona in Lazar's Serbia, next only to the prince himself. Stracimirović styled himself a 'Lord of Zeta and the Coast'.

== Legacy ==
1981 movie Banović Strahinja is based on the poem.
