= Živana Antonijević =

Serbian storyteller and gusle player

- Born: Живана Антонијевић; 1770s
- Died: 1828; Zemun, Austrian Empire
- Other names: Blind Živana
- Occupation: storyteller
- Known for: being one of the most important sources for Serbian epic poetry recorded by Vuk Karadžić

Živana Antonijević or Blind Živana (died in Zemun in 1828) was a Serb storyteller, gusle player (Serbian: guslar) and one of the most important sources for Serbian epic poetry recorded by Vuk Karadžić.

Živana was one of favorite women singers of Vuk Karadžić who published seven songs recorded from her:

- How the Christened name is served (Serbian: Како се крсно име служи)
- He who celebrates the Christened name is helped by it (Serbian: Ко крсно име слави оном и помаже)
- Marko Kraljević and Alil-Aga (Serbian: Марко Краљевић и Алил-ага)
- Marko Kraljević and the twelve Moors (Serbian: Марко Краљевић и дванаест Арапа)
- Perilous Bogdan and voivode Dragija (Serbian: Љутица Богдан и војвода Драгија)
- Vučko Ljubičić
- Nahod Momir

Some other songs are also recorded from her, including:

- Marko and the vila (Serbian: Марко Краљевић и вила)
- The unfaithful wife of Grujica (Serbian: Невјера љубе Грујичине)
- The Wedding of Todor of Stalać (Serbian: Женидба Тодора од Сталаћа)

Jelisaveta Marković (Blind Jeca), who was also a blind storyteller (one of four whose songs were recorded by Karadžić) was Živana's apprentice.
