= Immurement =

Live entombment usually until death

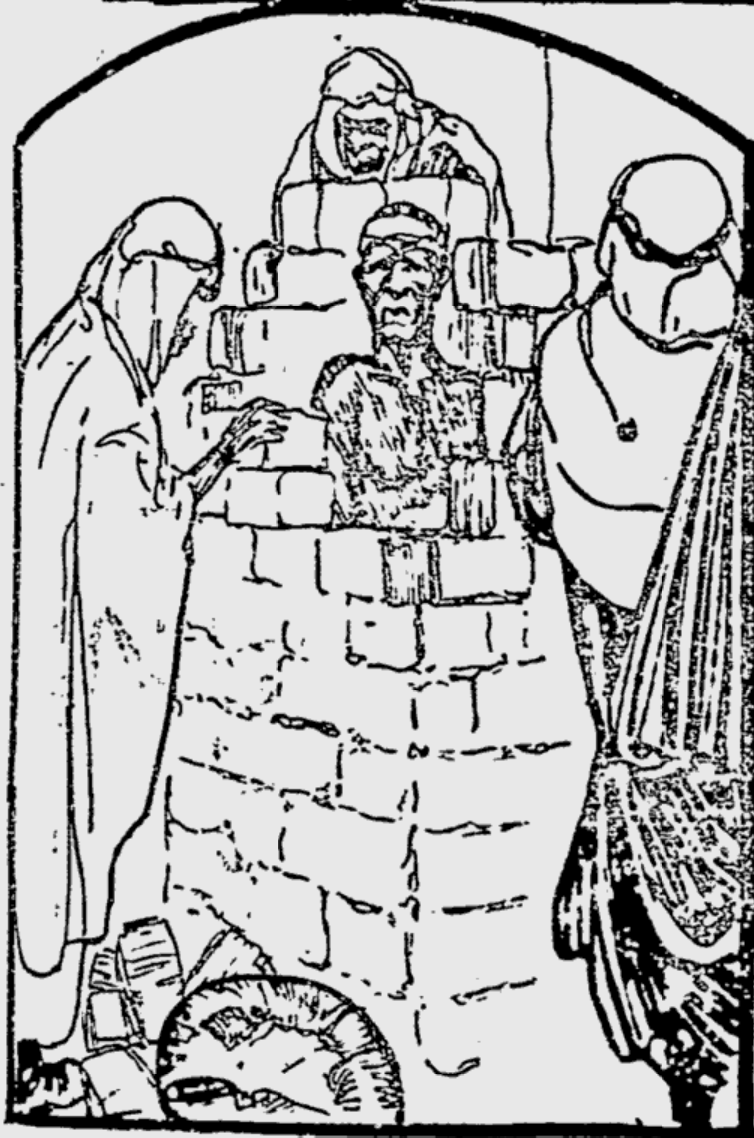
The execution of serial killer Hadj Mohammed Mesfewi

Immurement (from Latin im- 'in' and murus 'wall'; lit. 'walling in'), also called immuration or live entombment, is a form of imprisonment, usually until death, in which someone is placed within an enclosed space without exits. This includes instances where people have been enclosed in extremely tight confinement, such as within a coffin. When used as a means of execution, the prisoner is simply left to die from starvation or dehydration. This form of execution is distinct from being buried alive, in which the victim typically dies of asphyxiation. By contrast, immurement has also occasionally been used as an early form of life imprisonment, in which cases the victims were regularly fed and given water. There have been a few cases in which people have survived for months or years after being walled up, as well as some people, such as anchorites, who were voluntarily immured.

Notable examples of immurement as an established execution practice (with death from thirst or starvation as the intended aim) are attested. In the Roman Empire, Vestal Virgins faced live entombment as punishment if they were found guilty of breaking their chastity vows. Immurement has also been well established as a punishment of robbers in Persia, even into the early 20th century. Some ambiguous evidence exists of immurement as a practice of coffin-type confinement in Mongolia. One famous, but likely mythical, immurement was that of Anarkali by Emperor Akbar because of her supposed relationship with Prince Saleem.

Isolated incidents of immurement, rather than elements of continuous traditions, are attested or alleged from numerous other parts of the world. Instances of immurement as an element of massacre within the context of war or revolution are also noted. Entombing living persons as a type of human sacrifice is also reported, for example, as part of grand burial ceremonies in some cultures.

As a motif in legends and folklore, many tales of immurement exist. In the folklore, immurement is prominent as a form of capital punishment, but its use as a type of human sacrifice to make buildings sturdy has many tales attached to it as well. Skeletal remains have been, from time to time, found behind walls and in hidden rooms, and on several occasions have been asserted to be evidence of such sacrificial or punitive practices.

== History ==
=== Europe ===
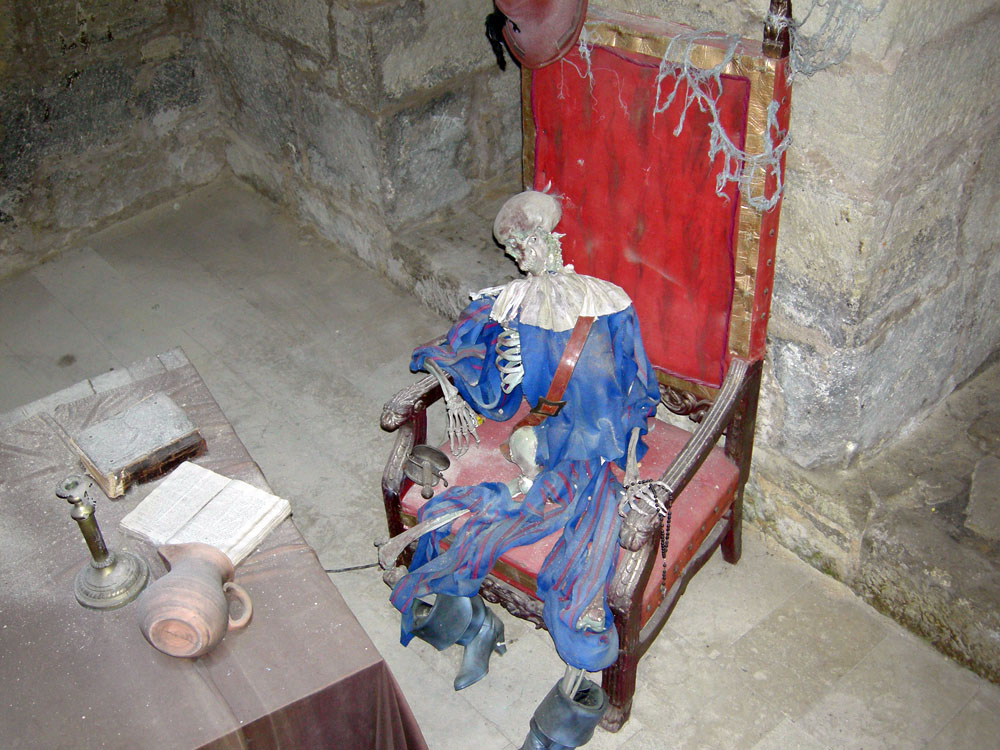
Re-creation of a 16th-century knight, who was believed to be entombed in a wall of Kuressaare Castle, Estonia

According to Finnish legend, a young maiden was wrongfully immured into the castle wall of Olavinlinna as a punishment for treason. The subsequent growth of a rowan tree at the location of her execution, whose flowers were as white as her innocence and berries as red as her blood, inspired a ballad. Similar legends stem from Haapsalu, Kuressaare, Põlva and Visby.

According to a Latvian legend, as many as three people might have been immured in tunnels under the Grobiņa Castle. A daughter of a knight living in the castle did not approve of her father's choice of a young nobleman as her future husband. Said knight also pillaged surrounding areas and took prisoners to live in the tunnels, among these a handsome young man whom the daughter took a liking to, helping him escape. Her fate was not so lucky as the knight and his future son-in-law punished her by immuring her in one of the tunnels. Another nobleman's daughter and a Swedish soldier are also said to be immured in one of the tunnels after she had fallen in love with the Swedish soldier and requested her father to allow her to marry him. According to another legend, a maiden and a servant were immured after a failed attempt at spying on Germans to gain intelligence on their plans for what is now Latvia.

In book 3 of his History of the Peloponnesian War, Thucydides goes into great detail on the revolution that broke out at Corfu in 427 BC:

Death thus raged in every shape; and, as usually happens at such times, there was no length to which violence did not go; sons were killed by their fathers, and suppliants dragged from the altar or slain upon it; while some were even walled up in the temple of Dionysus and died there.

The Vestal Virgins in ancient Rome constituted a class of priestesses whose principal duty was to maintain the sacred fire dedicated to Vesta (goddess of the home and the family), and they lived under a strict vow of chastity and celibacy. If that vow of chastity was broken, the offending priestess was immured alive as follows:

When condemned by the college of pontifices, she was stripped of her vittae and other badges of office, was scourged, attired like a corpse, placed in a closed litter, borne through the forum attended by her weeping kindred with all the ceremonies of a real funeral to a rising ground called the Campus Sceleratus. This was located just within the city walls, close to the Colline gate. A small vault underground had been previously prepared, containing a couch, a lamp, and a table with a little food. The pontifex maximus, having lifted up his hands to heaven and uttered a secret prayer, opened the litter, led forth the culprit, and placed her on the steps of the ladder which gave access to the subterranean cell. He delivered her over to the common executioner and his assistants, who led her down, drew up the ladder, and having filled the pit with earth until the surface was level with the surrounding ground, left her to perish deprived of all the tributes of respect usually paid to the spirits of the departed.

The order of the Vestal Virgins existed for about 1,000 years, but only about 10 effected immurements are attested in extant sources.

Flavius Basiliscus, emperor of the Eastern Roman Empire from AD 475–476, was deposed, and in winter he was sent to Cappadocia with his family. There they were imprisoned in either a dry cistern, or a tower, and perished. The historian Procopius said they died exposed to cold and hunger, while other sources, such as Priscus, merely speaks of death by starvation.

The patriarch of Aquileia, Poppo of Treffen (r. 1019–1045), was a mighty secular potentate, and in 1044 he sacked Grado. The newly elected Doge of Venice, Domenico I Contarini, captured him and allegedly let him be buried up to his neck, and left guards to watch over him until he died.

In 1149, Duke Otto III of Olomouc of the Moravian Přemyslid dynasty immured the abbot Deocar and 20 monks in the refectory in the monastery of Rhadisch, where they starved to death. Ostensibly this was because one of the monks had fondled his wife Duranna when she had spent the night there. However, Otto III confiscated the monastery's wealth, and some said this was the motive for the immurement.

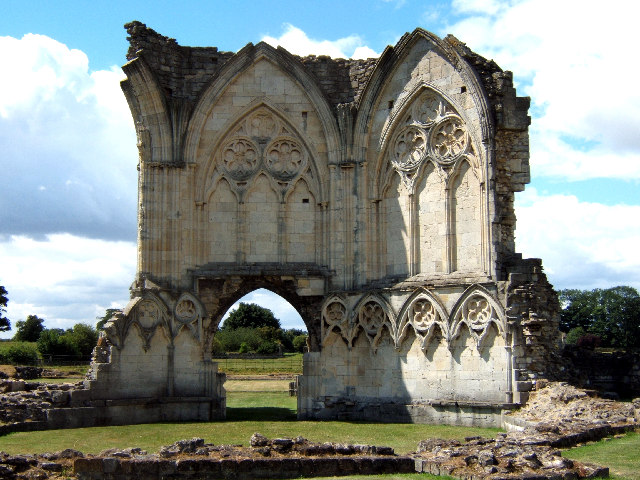
Ruins of Thornton Abbey

Local legend claims that in the 18th Century, in the ruins of Thornton Abbey, Lincolnshire, an immured skeleton was found behind a wall along with a table, a book, and a candlestick. By some, he is believed to be the fourteenth abbot, immured for some crime he had committed. However there is no evidence for this claimed discovery and it is likely a combination of local folklore.

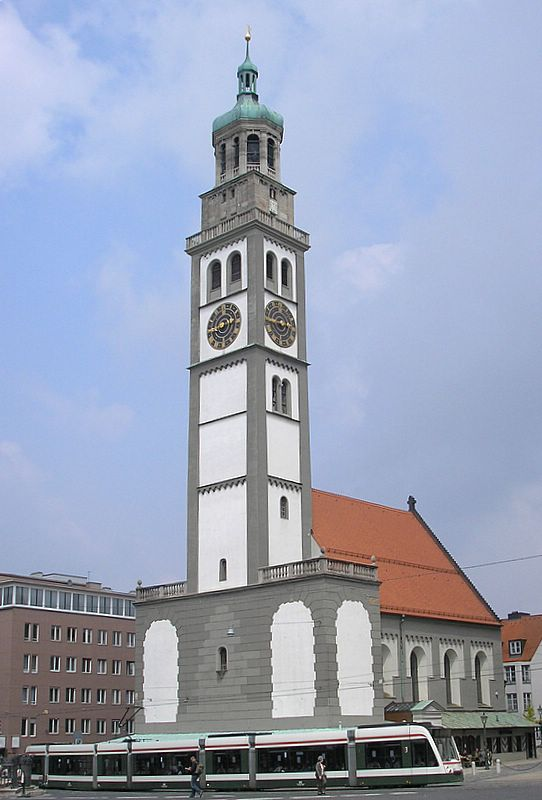
Perlachturm with St. Peter by Perlach

The actual punishment meted out to men found guilty of paederasty might vary between different status groups. In 1409 and 1532 in Augsburg, two men were burned alive for their offences; a rather different fate was prescribed to four clerics found guilty of the same offence in another 1409 case. Instead of burning, they were locked into a wooden casket that was hung up in the Perlachturm, and they starved to death.

After confessing in an Inquisition Court to an alleged conspiracy involving lepers, the Jewry, the King of Granada, and the Sultan of Babylon, Guillaume Agassa, head of the leper asylum at Lestang, was condemned in 1322 to be immured in shackles for life.

Hungarian countess Elizabeth Báthory de Ecsed (Báthory Erzsébet in Hungarian; 1560–1614) was immured in a set of rooms in 1610 for the death of several girls, with figures being as high as several hundred, though the actual number of victims is uncertain. The highest number of victims cited during the trial of Báthory's accomplices was 650; this number comes from a claim by a servant girl named Susannah that Jakab Szilvássy, Báthory's court official, had seen that figure in one of Báthory's private books. The book was never revealed and Szilvássy never mentioned it in his testimony. Being labeled the most prolific female serial killer in history has earned her the nickname of the "Blood Countess", and she is often compared with Vlad III the Impaler of Wallachia in folklore. She was allowed to live in immurement until she died, four years after being sealed, ultimately dying of causes other than starvation; evidently her rooms were well supplied with food. According to other sources (written documents from the visit of priests, July 1614), she was able to move freely and unhindered within the castle, more akin to house arrest.

==== Asceticism ====
A particularly severe form of asceticism within Christianity is that of anchorites, who typically allowed themselves to be immured, and subsisted on minimal food. For example, in the 4th century AD, one nun named Alexandra immured herself in a tomb for ten years with a tiny aperture enabling her to receive meager provisions. Saint Jerome (c. 340–420) spoke of one follower who spent his entire life in a cistern, consuming no more than five figs a day. Gregory of Tours, in his writings, related two stories of immurement, including that of a nun in Poitiers. She was immured in a cell at her own request after experiencing a vision of Salvius of Albi, who was himself immured for a period prior to becoming bishop.

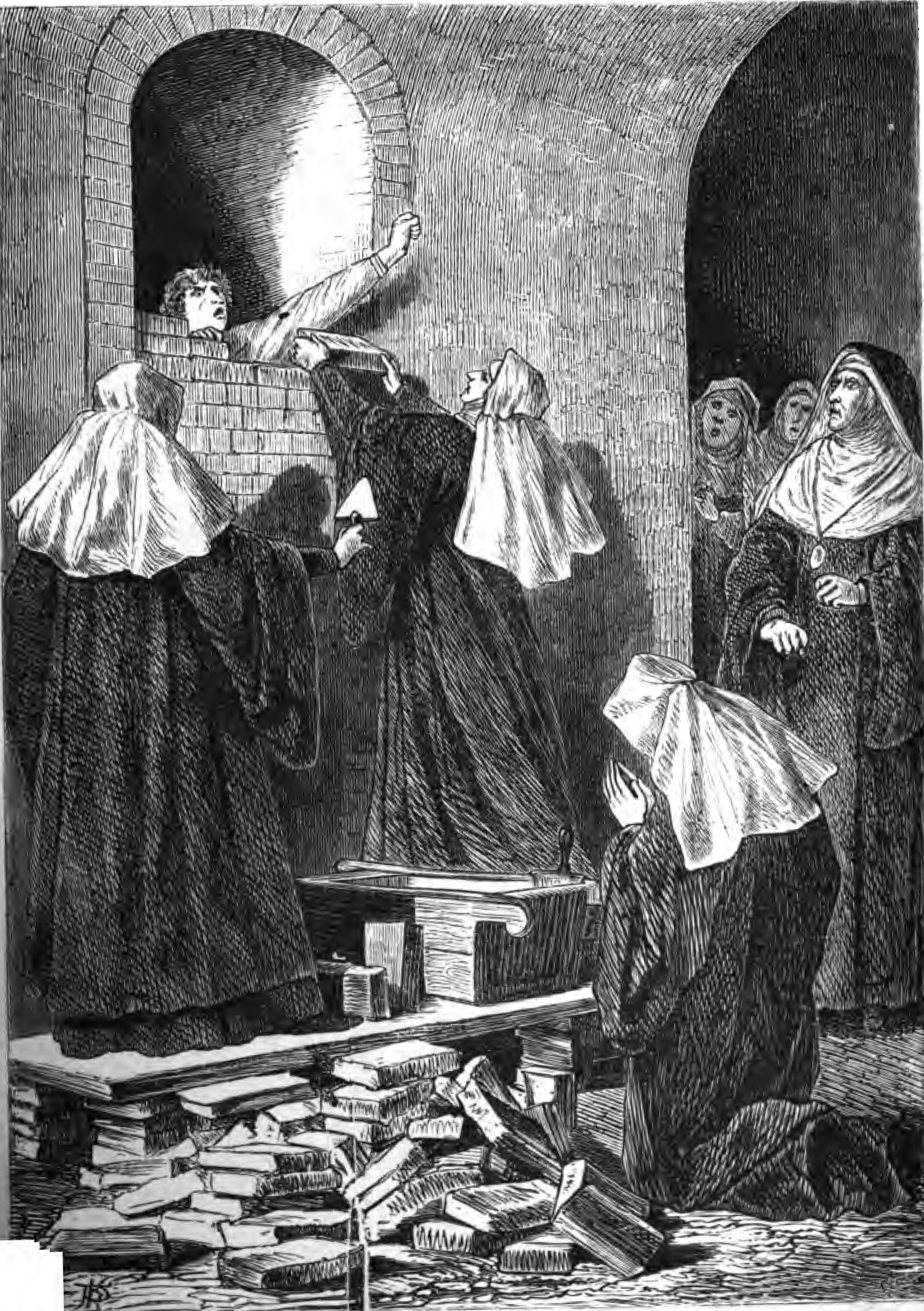
Immurement of a nun (fictitious depiction in an illustration from 1868)

In Catholic monastic tradition, there existed a type of enforced, solitary confinement for nuns or monks who had broken their vows of chastity, or espoused heretical ideas. Henry Charles Lea offers an example:

In the case of Jeanne, widow of B. de la Tour, a nun of Lespenasse, in 1246, who had committed acts of both Catharan and Waldensian heresy, and had prevaricated in her confession, the sentence was confinement in a separate cell in her own convent, where no one was to enter or see her, her food being pushed in through an opening left for the purpose—in fact, the living tomb known as the "in pace".

Indeed, the punitive function of in pace was that of perpetual seclusion. The guilty were condemned not to starve to death quickly, but to live in utter isolation from other human beings. As Lea describes in a footnote to this case:

The cruelty of the monastic system of imprisonment known as in pace, or vade in pacem, was such that those subjected to it speedily died in all the agonies of despair. In 1350 the Archbishop of Toulouse appealed to King John to interfere for its mitigation, and he issued an Ordonnance that the superior of the convent should twice a month visit and console the prisoner, who, moreover, should have the right twice a month to ask for the company of one of the monks. Even this slender innovation provoked the bitterest resistance of the Dominicans and Franciscans, who appealed to Pope Clement VI, but in vain.

Meanwhile, Sir Walter Scott, himself an antiquarian, favors the alternative in a remark to his epic poem Marmion (1808):

It is well known, that the religious, who broke their vows of chastity, were subjected to the same penalty as the Roman Vestals in a similar case. A small niche, sufficient to enclose their bodies, was made in the massive wall of the convent; a slender pittance of food and water was deposited in it and the awful words Vade in pace, were the signal for immuring the criminal. It is not likely that, in latter times, this punishment was often resorted to; but, among the ruins of the abbey of Coldingham were some years ago discovered the remains of a female skeleton which, from the shape of the niche, and the position of the figure seemed to be that of an immured nun.

The practice of immuring nuns or monks on breaches of chastity continued for several centuries into the early modern period. Francesca Medioli writes the following in her essay "Dimensions of the Cloister":

At Lodi in 1662 Sister Antonia Margherita Limera stood trial for having introduced a man into her cell and entertained him for a few days; she was sentenced to be walled in alive on a diet of bread and water. In the same year, the trial for breach of enclosure and sexual intercourse against the cleric Domenico Cagianella and Sister Vincenza Intanti of the convent of San Salvatore in Ariano had an identical outcome.

=== Asia ===
In the ancient Sumerian city of Ur some graves (as early as 2500 BC.) clearly show the burial of attendants, along with that of the principal dead person. In one such grave, as Gerda Lerner wrote on page 60 of her book The Creation of Patriarchy:

The human sacrifices were probably first drugged or poisoned, as evidenced by a drinking cup near each body, then the pit was immured, and covered with earth

The Neo-Assyrian Empire is notorious for its brutal repression techniques. Several of its rulers memorialized their victories in self-congratulatory detail. Here is a commemoration Ashurnasirpal II (r. 883–859 BC) made that includes immurement:

I erected a wall in front of the great gate of the city. I flayed the chiefs and covered this wall with their skins. Some of them were walled in alive in the masonry; others were impaled along the wall. I flayed a great number of them in my presence, and I clothed the wall with their skins. I collected their heads in the form of crowns, and their corpses I pierced in the shape of garlands ... My figure blooms on the ruins; in the glutting of my rage I find my content

Émile Durkheim in his work Suicide writes the following about certain followers of Amida Buddha:

The sectarians of Amida have themselves immured in caverns where there is barely space to be seated and where they can breathe only through an air shaft. There they quietly allow themselves to die of hunger.

By popular legend, Anarkali was immured between two walls in Lahore by order of Mughal Emperor Akbar for having a relationship with crown prince Salim (later Emperor Jehangir) in the 16th century. A bazaar developed around the site, and was named Anarkali Bazaar in her honour. A tradition existed in Persia of walling up criminals and leaving them to die of hunger or thirst. The traveller M. E. Hume-Griffith stayed in Persia from 1900 to 1903, and she wrote the following:

Another sad sight to be seen in the desert sometimes, are brick pillars in which some unfortunate victim is walled up alive ... The victim is put into the pillar, which is half built up in readiness; then if the executioner is merciful he will cement quickly up to the face, and death comes speedily. But sometimes a small amount of air is allowed to permeate through the bricks, and in this case the torture is cruel and the agony prolonged. Men bricked up in this way have been heard groaning and calling for water at the end of three days.

Travelling back and forth to Persia from 1630 to 1668 as a gem merchant, Jean-Baptiste Tavernier observed much the same custom that Hume-Griffith noted some 250 years later. Tavernier notes that immuring was principally a punishment for thieves, and that immurement left the convict's head out in the open. According to him, many of these individuals would implore passers-by to cut off their heads, an amelioration of the punishment forbidden by law. John Fryer, travelling Persia in the 1670s, writes:

From this Plain to Lhor, both in the Highways, and on the high Mountains, were frequent Monuments of Thieves immured in Terror of others who might commit the like Offence; they having literally a Stone-Doublet, whereas we say metaphorically, when any is in Prison, He has it Stone Doublet on; for these are plastered up, all but their Heads, in a round Stone Tomb, which are left out, not out of kindness, but to expose them to the Injury of the Weather, and Assaults of the Birds of Prey, who wreak their Rapin with as little Remorse, as they did devour their Fellow-Subjects.

In the late 1650s, various sons of the Mughal emperor Shah Jahan became embroiled in wars of succession, in which Aurangzeb was victorious. One of his half-brothers, Shah Shujah proved particularly troublesome, but in 1661 Aurangzeb defeated him, and Shah Shuja and his family sought the protection of the King of Arakan. According to Francois Bernier, the King reneged on his promise of asylum, and Shuja's sons were decapitated, while his daughters were immured and died of starvation.

During Mughal rule in early 18th century India, the two youngest sons of Guru Gobind Singh were sentenced to death by being bricked in alive for their refusal to convert to Islam and abandon the Sikh faith. On 26 December 1705, Fateh Singh was killed in this manner at Sirhind along with his elder brother, Zorawar Singh. Gurdwara Fatehgarh Sahib which is situated 5 km north of Sirhind marks the site of the execution of the two younger sons of Guru Gobind Singh at the behest of Wazir Khan of Kunjpura, the Governor of Sirhind. The three shrines within this Gurdwara complex mark the exact spot where these events were witnessed in 1705.

Jezzar Pasha, the Ottoman governor of provinces in modern Lebanon, and Palestine from 1775 to 1804, was infamous for his cruelties. When building the new walls of Beirut, he was charged with, among other things, the following:

... and this monster had taken the name of Dgezar (Butcher) as an illustrious addition to his title. It was, no doubt, well deserved; for he had immured alive a great number of Greek Christians when he rebuilt the Walls of Barut..The heads of these miserable victims, which the butcher had left out, in order to enjoy their tortures, are still to be seen.

Staying as a diplomat in Persia from 1860 to 1863, E. B. Eastwick met at one time, the Sardar i Kull, or military high commander, Aziz Khan. Eastwick notes that he "did not strike me as one who would greatly err on the side of leniency". Eastwick was told that just recently, Aziz Khan had ordered 14 robbers walled up alive, two of them head-downwards. Staying for the year 1887–1888 primarily in Shiraz, Edward Granville Browne noted the gloomy reminders of a particularly bloodthirsty governor there, Firza Ahmed, who in his four years of office (ending circa 1880) had caused, for example, more than 700 hands cut off for various offences. Browne continues:

Besides these minor punishments, many robbers and others suffered death; not a few were walled up alive in pillars of mortar, there to perish miserably. The remains of these living tombs may still be seen outside Derwaze-i-kassah-khane ("Slaughter-house Gate") at Shiraz, while another series lines the road as it enters the little town of Abade...

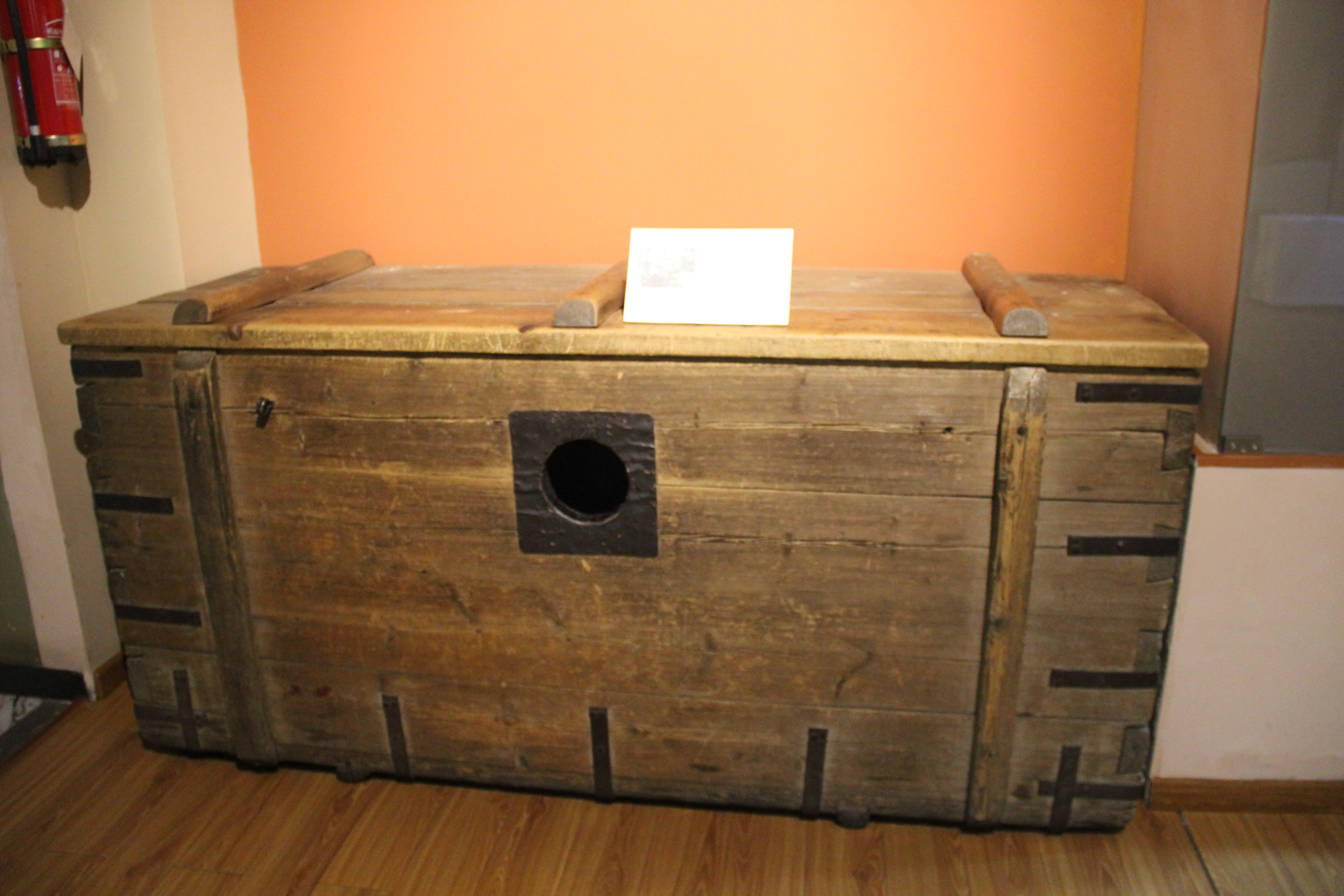
Wooden trunk used in Qing Mongolia to lock criminals

Immurement was practiced in Mongolia as recently as the early 20th century. It is not clear that all thus immured were meant to die of starvation. In a newspaper report from 1914, it is written:

... the prisons and dungeons of the Far Eastern country contain a number of refined Chinese shut up for life in heavy iron-bound coffins, which do not permit them to sit upright or lie down. These prisoners see daylight for only a few minutes daily when the food is thrown into their coffins through a small hole.

=== North Africa ===
In 1906, Hadj Mohammed Mesfewi, a cobbler from Marrakesh, was found guilty of murdering 36 women; the bodies were found buried underneath his shop and nearby. Due to the nature of his crimes, he was walled up alive. For two days his screams were heard incessantly before silence by the third day.

== Sacrificial variations ==
=== Construction ===
A number of cultures have tales and ballads containing as a motif the sacrifice of a human being to ensure the strength of a building. For example, there was a culture of human sacrifice in the construction of large buildings in East and Southeast Asia. Such practices ranged from da sheng zhuang (打生樁) in China to hitobashira in Japan and myosade (မြို့စတေး) in Burma.

The folklore of many Southeastern European peoples refers to immurement as the mode of death for the victim sacrificed during the completion of a construction project, such as a bridge or fortress (mostly real buildings). The Castle of Shkodra is the subject of such stories in both the Albanian oral tradition and in the Slavic one. The Albanian version is The Legend of Rozafa, in which three brothers uselessly toil at building walls which always disappear at night: when told that they must bury one of their wives in the wall, they pledge to choose the one that brings them luncheon the next day, and not to warn their respective spouses. However, two brothers secretly inform their wives (the topos of two fellows betraying one being common in Balkan poetry, cf. Miorița or the Song of Çelo Mezani), leaving Rozafa, wife of the honest brother, to die. She accepts her fate, but asks that they leave exposed a foot to rock the infant son's cradle, a breast to feed him, and a hand to stroke his hair.

One of the most famous versions of the same legend is the Serbian epic poem called The Building of Skadar (Зидање Скадра, Zidanje Skadra) published by Vuk Karadžić, after he recorded a folk song sung by a Herzegovinian storyteller named Old Rashko. The version of the song in the Serbian language is the oldest collected version of the legend, and the first one which earned literary fame. The three brothers in the legend were represented by members of the noble Mrnjavčević family, Vukašin, Uglješa and Gojko. In 1824, Karadžić sent a copy of his folksong collection to Jacob Grimm, who was particularly enthralled by the poem. Grimm translated it into German, and described it as "one of the most touching poems of all nations and all times". Johann Wolfgang von Goethe published the German translation, but did not share Grimm's opinion because he found the poem's spirit "superstitiously barbaric". Alan Dundes, a famous folklorist, noted that Grimm's opinion prevailed and that the ballad continued to be admired by generations of folksingers and ballad scholars.

A very similar Romanian legend, that of Meşterul Manole, tells of the building of the Curtea de Argeș Monastery. Ten expert masons, among them Master Manole himself, are ordered by Neagu Voda to build a beautiful monastery, but incur the same fate, and also decide to immure the wife who will bring them luncheon. Manole, working on the roof, sees her approach, and pleads in vain with God to unleash the elements in order to stop her. When she arrives, he proceeds to wall her in, pretending to be doing so in jest, while she cries out increasingly in pain and distress. When the building is finished, Neagu Voda takes away the masons' ladders, fearing they will build a more beautiful building. They try to escape, but all fall to their deaths. Only from Manole's fall a stream is created.

Many other Bulgarian and Romanian folk poems and songs describe a bride offered for such purposes, and her subsequent pleas to the builders to leave her hands and breasts free, that she might still nurse her child. Later versions of the songs revise the bride's death; her fate to languish entombed within the construction is transmuted to her nonphysical shadow, and its loss yet leads to her pining away and eventual death.

Other variations include the Hungarian folk ballad "Kőmíves Kelemen" (Kelemen the Stonemason). This is the story of twelve unfortunate stonemasons tasked with building the fort of Déva. To remedy its recurring collapses, it is agreed that one of the builders must sacrifice his bride, and the bride to be sacrificed will be she who first comes to visit. In some versions of the ballad the victim is shown some mercy; rather than being trapped alive she is burned and only her ashes are immured.

A Greek story, "The Bridge of Arta" (Greek: Γεφύρι της Άρτας), describes numerous failed attempts to build a bridge in that city. Again, a cycle wherein a team of skilled builders toils all day only to return the next morning to find their work demolished is eventually ended when the master mason's wife is immured. Legend has it that a maiden was immured in the walls of Madliena church as a sacrifice or offering after continuous failed construction attempts. The pastor achieved this by inviting all of the most beautiful maidens to a feast; the most beautiful one, Madaļa, falls into a deep sleep after the pastor offers wine from "certain goblet".

=== Ceremonial ===
Within Inca culture, it is reported that one element in the great Sun festival was the sacrifice of young maidens (between ten and twelve years old), who after their ceremonial duties were done were lowered down in a waterless cistern and immured alive. The children of Llullaillaco represent another form of Incan child sacrifice.

Acknowledging the traditions of human sacrifice in the context of the building of structures within German and Slavic folklore, Jacob Grimm offers some examples of the sacrifice of animals as well. According to him, within Danish traditions, a lamb was immured under an erected altar in order to preserve it, while a churchyard was to be ensured protection by immuring a living horse as part of the ceremony. In the ceremonies of erection of other types of constructions, Grimm notices that other animals were sacrificed as well, such as pigs, hens and dogs.

Harold Edward Bindloss, in his 1898 non-fiction work In the Niger Country, writes of the funeral of a powerful chief:

Only a few years ago, when a powerful headman died not very far from Bonny, [on the coast of Nigeria,] several of his wives had their legs broken, and were buried alive with him.

Similarly, the 14th century traveller Ibn Batuta observed the burial of a great khan:

The Khan who had been killed, with about a hundred of his relatives, was then brought, and a large sepulchre was dug for him under the earth, in which a most beautiful couch was spread, and the Khan was with his weapons laid upon it. With him they placed all the gold and silver vessels he had in his house, together with four female slaves, and six of his favourite Mamluks, with a few vessels of drink. They were then all closed up, and the earth heaped upon them to the height of a large hill.

== In literature and the arts ==
=== Opera ===
At the end of Verdi's opera Aida the Egyptian General Radames is found guilty of treason and is immured in a cave as punishment. Once the cave is enclosed, he discovers that his lover Aida has hidden in the cave to be with him, and they die there together.

=== Literature ===
In Honoré de Balzac's 1831 story La Grande Bretèche, Madame de Merret is accused by her husband of hiding a lover in her bedroom closet; she swears on a crucifix that no one is in there and threatens to leave him if he casts doubt on her character by checking. In response, her husband has the closet door sealed and plastered over, then spends the next twenty days living in his wife's room to ensure her lover cannot escape.

Ariana Franklin's Mistress of the Art of Death (2007) includes the execution of a nun by walling her into her cell, to circumvent the protection usually afforded by her vows.

In the 1978 novel The Three-Arched Bridge by Albanian writer Ismail Kadare, the immurement of a villager plays an important role; whether or not he volunteered or was punished remains unclear. The book also contains discussion on the background and motives of the characters in the Legend of Rozafa.

=== Stage, film, and television ===
In the play Antigone, the titular character is immured in a cave by King Creon for performing funeral rites for Polynices, though her death ultimately comes from hanging inside of her tomb.

In the 1944 film The Canterville Ghost, Sir Simon (Charles Laughton) is immured by his father while he is hiding to avoid fighting a duel.

At the end of the 1955 movie Land of the Pharaohs, scheming Princess Nellifer (Joan Collins) is shocked to learn that she has been immured in the tomb of her husband Pharaoh Khufu (Jack Hawkins).

In "The Ikon of Elijah", a 1960 episode of Alfred Hitchcock Presents, the main character is immured in a monastic cell as penance for having killed a monk.

Edgar Allan Poe's short story "The Cask of Amontillado", in which the narrator murders a rival by immuring him in a crypt, has been adapted for film and television, including a segment in Roger Corman's anthology Tales of Terror (1962) and an episode of the 2023 Netflix series The Fall of the House of Usher.

The walling-in of wayward monastics, individuals and entire cloisters alike, is common in the genre of nunsploitation; several such films draw on the historical case of the Nun of Monza in particular. Though in reality she was released from immurement after serving some 10 or 15 years, some movies dramatize her fate as one of permanent confinement.

In the 1976 Danish comedy film The Olsen Gang Sees Red the protagonist is momentarily immured in a castle dungeon next to actual immurements.

In a 1984 episode of Thomas the Tank Engine "The Sad Story of Henry" the engine Henry was immured as punishment for disobeying the orders of The Fat Controller.

In a 1999 episode of Angel, "Room of a Vu", Maude Pearson immured her son Dennis.

In a 2003 episode of The Simpsons, "C.E.D'oh", Mr. Burns unsuccessfully tries to immure Homer Simpson as revenge for taking over the Springfield Nuclear Power Plant.

== See also ==
- "The Cask of Amontillado"
- Dried cat
- Oubliette
- Life imprisonment
- Human sacrifice

== Bibliography ==
- Altekar, Anant S. (1959). The Position of Women in Hindu Civilization: From Prehistoric Times to the Present Day. Madras: Motilal Banarsidass Publ. ISBN 9788120803244.
- Baltikumresan. "The immured knight". aulik.se. Baltikumresan. Archived from the original on 2013-12-03.
- ibn Batuta; Lee (1829). The Travels of Ibn Batuta. London: Oriental Translation Committee.
- Bechstein, Ludwig (1858). Thüringer sagenbuch. Coburg: C. A. Hartleben.
- Bernier, Francois (1916). Travels in the Mogul Empire, A.D. 1656–1668. London: Milford, Oxford University Press.
- Bindloss, Harold (1898). In the Niger country. Edinburgh and London: W. Blachwood and Sons.
- Brown, Harry J. (2004). Injun Joe's Ghost: The Indian Mixed-blood in American Writing. Columbia, Missouri: University of Missouri Press. ISBN 9780826262448.
- Browne, Edward G. (2013). A Year Amongst The Persians. London: Routledge. ISBN 9781136183966.
- Burian, Peter; Shapiro, Alan (2010). The Complete Sophocles: Volume I: The Theban Plays. Oxford: Oxford University Press. ISBN 9780199830930.
- Chmel, Joseph (1841). Der österreichische Geschichtsforscher, Volume 2. Vienna: Carl Gerold.
- Cornis-Pope, Marcel; Neubauer, John (2004). History of the Literary Cultures of East-Central Europe: Junctures and Disjunctures in the 19th and 20th Centuries. John Benjamins Publishing. ISBN 978-90-272-3455-1.
- Dowling, Melissa (2001). "Vestal Virgins – Chaste keepers of the flame". BAS Library. Biblical Archaeological Society.
- Dundes, Alan (1996). The Walled-Up Wife: A Casebook. University of Wisconsin Press. ISBN 9780299150730.
- Durkheim, Emile (2010). Suicide. Simon and Schuster. ISBN 9781439118269.
- Elliade, Mircea (1996). Dundes, Alan (ed.). The Walled-up Wife: A Casebook. Madison, Wisconsin: Univ of Wisconsin Press. ISBN 9780299150730.
- Eastwick, Edward B. (1864). Journal of a Diplomate's Three Years' Residence in Persia, Volume 1. London: Smith, Elder and Company.
- Evagrius (2000). The Ecclesiastical History of Evagrius Scholasticus. Liverpool: Liverpool University Press. ISBN 9780853236054.
- ExecutedToday.com (19 July 2019). "1762: Crown Prince Sado, locked in a rice chest". ExecutedToday.com.
- French, Marilyn (2008). From Eve to Dawn: A History of Women, Volume 1. New York: Feminist Press at CUNY. ISBN 9781558616196.
- Fryer, John (1698). A New Account of East-India and Persia, in Eight Letters: Being Nine Years Travels Begun 1672 and Finished 1681. London: Chiswell.
- Fumagalli, Maria C. (2001). The Flight of the Vernacular: Seamus Heaney, Derek Walcott and the Impress of Dante. Amsterdam: Rodopi. ISBN 9789042014763.
- Grimm, Jacob (1854). Deutsche Mythologie. [With] Anhang. Göttingen: Dieterische Buchh.
- Haapsalu. "The Immured Lady". haapsalu.ee. Haapsalu township. Archived from the original on 2009-08-19.
- Hayes, Kevin, ed. (2012). Edgar Allan Poe in Context. Cambridge: Cambridge University Press. ISBN 9781107009974.
- Hübner, Johann (1700). Kurze Fragen aus der politischen Historia biß auf gegenwärtige Zeit, Volume 3. Gleditsch.
- Hume-Griffith, M.E. (1909). Behind the veil in Persia and Turkish Arabia; an account of an Englishwoman's eight years' residence amongst the women of the East. With narratives of experiences in both countries. Philadelphia: J. B. Lippincott & Co.
- Jansone, Una. "Grobiņas pils". pasakas.net. Archived from the original on January 19, 2012.
- Krehbiel, Henry (2006). Book of Operas EasyRead Edition. ReadHowYouWant.com. ISBN 9781442938106.
- Kurkijan, Vahan M. (2008). A History of Armenia. New York: Indo-European Publishing. ISBN 9781604440126.
- Lea, Henry C (2012). A History of The Inquisition of The Middle Ages; volume I. Project Gutenberg.
- Lerner, Gerda (1986). The Creation of Patriarchy, Volume 1. Oxford: Oxford University Press. ISBN 9780195051858.
- Levy, Reuben (1957). The Social Structure of Islam: Being the Second Edition of The Sociology of Islam. Cambridge: CUP Archive. ISBN 9780521091824.
- Mallows, Lucy (2013). Transylvania. Bradt Travel Guides. ISBN 9781841624198.
- Medioli, Francesca (2001). Schutte, Anna Jacobson; Kuehn, Thomas; Menchi, Silvana Seidel (eds.). Time, Space, and Women's Lives in Early Modern Europe. Kirksville, MO: Truman State University Press. ISBN 9780943549903.
- Моллов, Тодор (14 August 2002). "Троица братя града градяха" (in Bulgarian). LiterNet.
- Muhammad Ali, Maulana (2011). Holy Quran, English Translation and Commentary. eBookIt.com. ISBN 9781934271148.
- New Zealand Herald (17 February 1914). "Immured in Coffins". New Zealand Herald. LI.
- Noor, Raza. "Anarkali's Tomb". Staff Page for Raza Noor. University of Alberta. Archived from the original on 2022-03-18.
- O'Reilly, Sean; O'Reilly, James (2000). Pilgrimage: Adventures of the Spirit. Travelers' Tales. ISBN 9781885211569.
- Osenbrüggen, Eduard (1860). Das alamannische Strafrecht im deutschen Mittelalter. Schaffhausen: Hurter.
- Planetware. "Visby Tourist Attractions". Planetware.
- Mistérios do Mundo (12 June 2019). "A história do emparedamento, uma das formas mais cruéis de tortura e execução já inventadas". Mistérios do Mundo.
- "Põlva linn". polva.ee/tourism. Polva Tourism. Archived from the original on 2013-12-03.
- Pozemovskis, Ēriks. "Kā cēlies Madlienas nosaukums". Archived from the original on August 31, 2009.
- Procopius (2007). History of the Wars: Books 3–4 (Vandalic War). Cosimo, Inc. ISBN 9781602064461.
- Riepl, Ludwig. "Aus der Geschichte von Weitersfelden". weitersfelden.ooe.gv.at. Weitersfelden Government.
- Rohrbacher, David (2013). The Historians of Late Antiquity. London: Routledge. ISBN 9781134628858.
- Sarris, Peter (2011). Empires of Faith: The Fall of Rome to the Rise of Islam, 500–700. Oxford: Oxford University Press. ISBN 9780191620027.
- Sbornici. "Three Brothers Were Building a Fortress". liternet.bg.
- Sbornici. "Immured Bride". liternet.bg.
- Scott, Walter (1833). The Complete Works of Sir Walter Scott: With a Biography, and His Last Additions and Illustrations, Volume 1. New York: Conner & Cooke.
- Skëndi, Stavro (2007). Poezia epike gojore e shqiptarëve dhe e sllavëve të jugut. Instituti i Dialogut & Komunikimit. ISBN 9789994398201.
- Smith, Anthon (1846). A school dictionary of Greek and Roman antiquities. London: Harper.
- Tappe, Eric (1984). "A Rumanian Ballad and its English Adaptation". Folklore. 95 (1). Folklore Enterprises Ltd.: 113–119. doi:10.1080/0015587x.1984.9716302. ISSN 0015-587X. JSTOR 1259765.
- Tavernier, Jean-Baptiste; Phillips, John (1678). The six voyages of John Baptista Tavernier. London: R.L and M.P.
- Taylor, Lou (2009) [1983]. Mourning Dress (Routledge Revivals): A Costume and Social History. London: Routledge. ISBN 9780203871324.
- The St.John Sun (8 September 1906). "Walled in Alive". The St.John Sun. 30. Ruby Douglas: 13.
- Thucydides. "The Pelopennesian War 3.69–3.85:Civil War at Corcyra". The Perseus Digital Library. Tufts University. Archived from the original on 2014-03-22.
- de Tott, Francois (1786). Memoirs of Baron de Tott: Containing the State of the Turkish Empire & the Crimea, During the Late War with Russia. With Numerous Anecdotes, Facts, & Observations, on the Manners & Customs of the Turks & Tartars, Volume 2. London: G.G.J. & J. Robinson.
- Varner, Eric R. (2004). Monumenta Graeca et Romana: Mutilation and transformation : damnatio memoriae and Roman imperial portraiture. Leiden: Brill. ISBN 9789004135772.
- Wekebrod, Franz Xaver (1814). Mährens Kirchengeschichte, Volume 1. Brünn (Brno): Traßler.
- Wilde, Oscar (1998). Murray, Isobel (ed.). Complete Shorter Fiction. Oxford: Oxford University Press. ISBN 9780192833761.
