= Impostor (disambiguation) =

An impostor or imposter is a person who pretends to be somebody else.

Impostor(s), Imposter(s), The Impostor(s), or The Imposter(s) may also refer to:

== Computing ==
- Impostor (computer graphics) or sprite, an image or animation integrated into a larger scene
- Impostors, a fictional alien race and the antagonists of the 2018 social deduction game Among Us

== Film ==
- The Impostor (1918 film), a film by George Abbott and Dell Henderson
- Impostor (1921 film), a German silent film
- The Impostor (1921 film), a film by Robert N. Bradbury
- The Impostor (1926 film), a film starring Evelyn Brent
- The Impostor (1927 film), a German silent film
- Foreign Correspondent (film), a 1940 film with the working title The Imposter
- The Impostor (1944 American film), a film by Julien Duvivier
- The Impostor (1944 German film), a German comedy film
- The Great Impostor, a 1961 American film
- The Imposter (1975 American film), a TV film starring Meredith Baxter
- The Imposter (1975 Hong Kong film), a film produced by Shaw Brothers
- The Imposter, a 1984 TV film featuring Ken Olandt
- El Impostor (film), a 1997 American film produced by Oscar Kramer
- The Impostors, a 1998 film by Stanley Tucci
- Impostor (2001 film), a science fiction film
- The Imposter (2008 film), a Christian film by Dan Millican
- The Imposter (2012 film), a documentary about the 1997 case of Frédéric Bourdin
- Imposters (film), a 2026 horror film

== Literature ==
=== Comics ===
- Batman: The Imposter, an American comic book limited series published by DC Comics (October–December 2021)

=== Novels ===
- The Impostor, a 1905 novel by Harold Bindloss
- The Imposter (novel), a 1927 novel by the French writer Georges Bernanos
- The Impostor, a 1954 novel by Noel Gerson
- The Impostor, a 1970 novel by Edmund Keeley
- The Impostor, a 1977 novel by Helen McCloy
- The Impostor, a 1992 novel by June Drummond
- The Impostor, a 2003 novel by Celeste Bradley; the second installment in The Liar's Club series
- The Impostor, a 2008 novel by Damon Galgut
- El Impostor, a 2014 novel by Javier Cercas
- Impostors, a 2018 novel by Scott Westerfeld; the first in the eponymous tetralogy
- Impostor, a 2019 novel by LJ Ross
- The Imposters, a 2023 novel by Tom Rachman
- The Impostor, a 2023 novel by Edgard Telles Ribeiro

=== Plays ===
- Tartuffe (full title: Tartuffe, or the Impostor), a 1664 comedic play by Molière
- The Impostors (play), a 1789 play by Richard Cumberland
- L'impostore, an 18th-century play by Carlo Goldoni
- If I Were for Real (play), a 1979 Chinese play, also translated as The Impostor
- Az imposztor, a 1983 play by György Spiró, also translated as The impostor

=== Short stories ===
- "Impostor" (short story), a 1953 science fiction story by Philip K. Dick
- "The Imposter" (short story), a 1997 story by Nathanael West

== Music ==
- Imposter (album), a 2021 album by Dave Gahan and Soulsavers
- The Imposter (album), a 2005 album by Kevin Max
- The Impostor (Banjo Concerto), a 2011 concerto by Béla Fleck
- "Imposter", a 1981 song by The Moondogs
- "Imposter", a song by Oingo Boingo from the 1981 album Only a Lad
- "Impostor", a song by The Doubleclicks from the 2013 album Lasers and Feelings
- "Imposter", a song by Daron Malankian and Scars on Broadway from the 2025 album Addicted to the Violence
- "Imposter", a song by Louis Tomlinson from the 2026 album How Did I Get Here?
- The Imposters, a backing band for Elvis Costello

== Television ==
=== Series ===
- Impostor (TV series), a 2010 Philippine TV series starring Maja Salvador and Melai Cantiveros
- The Imposter, a syndication title for the DuMont TV series Colonel Humphrey Flack (1953–54)
- Imposters (TV series), a 2017 American television series on Bravo
- The Imposters, a hidden-camera television pilot co-starring comedian Mal Sharpe
- L'Imposteur ("The Imposter"), a 2016 Québec television series starring Marc-André Grondin
- Impostora (The Impostor), a 2008 Philippine television series starring Sunshine Dizon and Iza Calzado
  - Impostora (2017 TV series) (Impostor), a 2017 Philippine television series starring Kris Bernal

=== Episodes ===
- "The Imposters" (Dawson's Creek), a 2002 episode
- "Imposters" (Star Trek: Picard), a 2023 episode
- "The Impostors" (Thunderbirds), a 1966 episode
- "The Impostor" (The Villain Pub), a 2020 episode
- Imposter: The Man Who Came Back from the Dead, a 2024 Channel 4 documentary about Nicholas Alahverdian

== See also ==
- Impostor syndrome, when a person is unable to internalize accomplishments
- Masih ad-Dajjal ("The Impostor Messiah"), an evil figure in Islamic eschatology
- The Imposture, a 1640 play by James Shirley
