= The Great Impostor (disambiguation) =

The Great Impostor was a 1961 American comedy-drama film about Ferdinand Waldo Demara.

The Great Impostor may also refer to:

== Entertainment ==
- The Great Impostor (1918 film), a British silent drama film
- "(He's) The Great Imposter", a 1961 song by The Fleetwoods

== Literature ==
- The Great Impostor, a 1959 book by Robert Crichton about Ferdinand Waldo Demara upon which the film is loosely based
- The Great Imposters, a 1962 book by Gerald Sparrow

== People ==
- Barry Bremen (1947–2011), known by the nickname "The Great Imposter"
- Ferdinand Waldo Demara (1921–1982), known by the nickname "The Great Impostor"

== See also ==
- Impostor (disambiguation)
