= György Spiró =

Hungarian writer

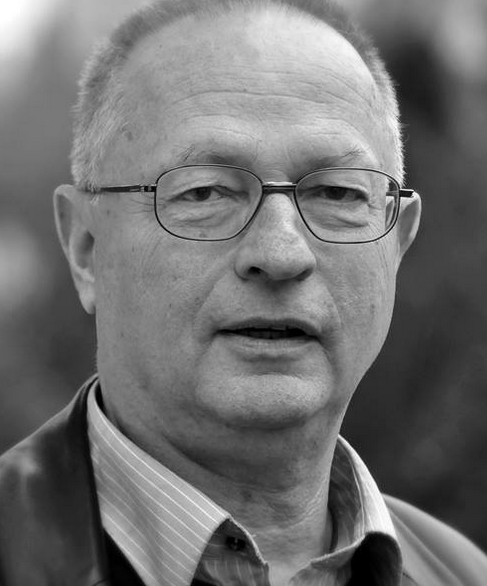
György Spiró

György (George) Spiró (born 4 April 1946 in Budapest) is a dramatist, novelist and essayist who has emerged as one of post-war Hungary's most prominent literary figures. He is a member of the Széchenyi Academy of Literature and Arts.

== Life ==
The son of an engineer from Miskolc in eastern Hungary, he graduated in Hungarian and Slavic literature from the Eötvös Loránd University (ELTE) in 1970, and completed additional studies in journalism and sociology. His earlier career was spent in radio journalism. More recently, in addition to his writing, he has been employed as associate professor at the Department of World Literature and currently at the Institute of Art Theory and Media Studies at ELTE.

His plays have won numerous awards, including several for best Hungarian drama of the year. A few of them are available in English translation. The best known one is Csirkefej (Chickenhead, 1986), an earthy and bitter drama of a young delinquent's disillusionment at the longed-for reunion with his drunken father. Dramatic Exchange said it was "widely considered to be the most important Hungarian play of the last 20 years".

His avant-garde style, depicting coarse language and characters outside the pale of respectability, often dismayed more traditional Hungarian critics.

His book, Az Ikszek (The X-s), which appeared in 1981, is a historical novel about the National Theatre of Poland in the first years of the 19th century, with Wojciech Bogusławski as the main character. The novel is about the fight of the artists against censorship.

In 2005, he published an 800-page novel, Fogság (Captivity). Set in the Roman Empire in the time of the Julio-Claudian dynasty, it follows the experiences of a Jewish wanderer named Uri. Spiró's earlier works eschewed Jewish themes, but in this work he returns to his ancestral roots.

In 2007, he published the rewritten Messiások (Messiahs), another historical novel, for which he was awarded the Angelus Award.

The hugely successful Tavaszi Tárlat (Spring Exhibition, 2010) describes the early days of the Kádár regime.

== Selected bibliography ==
=== Novels ===
- Kerengő (1974)
- Az Ikszek (1981)
- A Jövevény (1990)
- A Jégmadár (2001)
- Fogság (2005). Captivity, trans. Tim Wilkinson (2015)
- Messiások (2007)
- Feleségverseny (2009)
- Tavaszi Tárlat (2010)
- Diavolina (2015)
- Kőbéka. Mesély (2017)
- Padmaly (2025)

=== Plays ===
- 1982 – A békecsászár (Hannibál; Balassi Menyhárt; Kőszegők; Káró király; A békecsászár)
- 1987 – Csirkefej (Jeruzsálem pusztulása; Az imposztor; A kert; Esti műsor; Csirkefej)
- 1997 – Mohózat (Ahogy tesszük; Legújabb Zrínyiász; Árpádház; Dobardan; Vircsaft; Kvartett)
- 2002 – Honderű (Honderű, Fogadó a Nagy Kátyúhoz, Szappanopera, Elsötétítés)

=== Poetry ===
- História (1977)

=== Featured in ===
- Balkan Plots: Plays from Central and Eastern Europe, 2000. Aurora Metro Books.
