= Chickenhead (play) =

1985 play by György Spiró

Chickenhead (Csirkefej) is a Hungarian tragedy in 16 acts written by György Spiró in 1985. The background of the play is the ever so bleak realism of the socialist Hungary in the 1980s: An old woman gets killed in a rural apartment building after they had killed her cat.

The title of the play refers in the first instance to the chicken heads that an old woman feeds to her cat. However, it can also be taken to refer more broadly to the obtuse behaviour of the main characters in the play. The play is an odd mixture of pathos and nihilism, written against the bleak background of Stalinist totalitarianism from which Hungary was emerging. As with much modern drama, there is no hero in the play. The only noble behaviour that one can find belongs to one of the characters in the past, when he was a child, but he is no longer as he was. The hint that what once existed might be achieved again is the only faint ray of hope in a very bleak view of the human condition.
