= Hadj Mohammed Mesfewi =

Moroccan serial killer

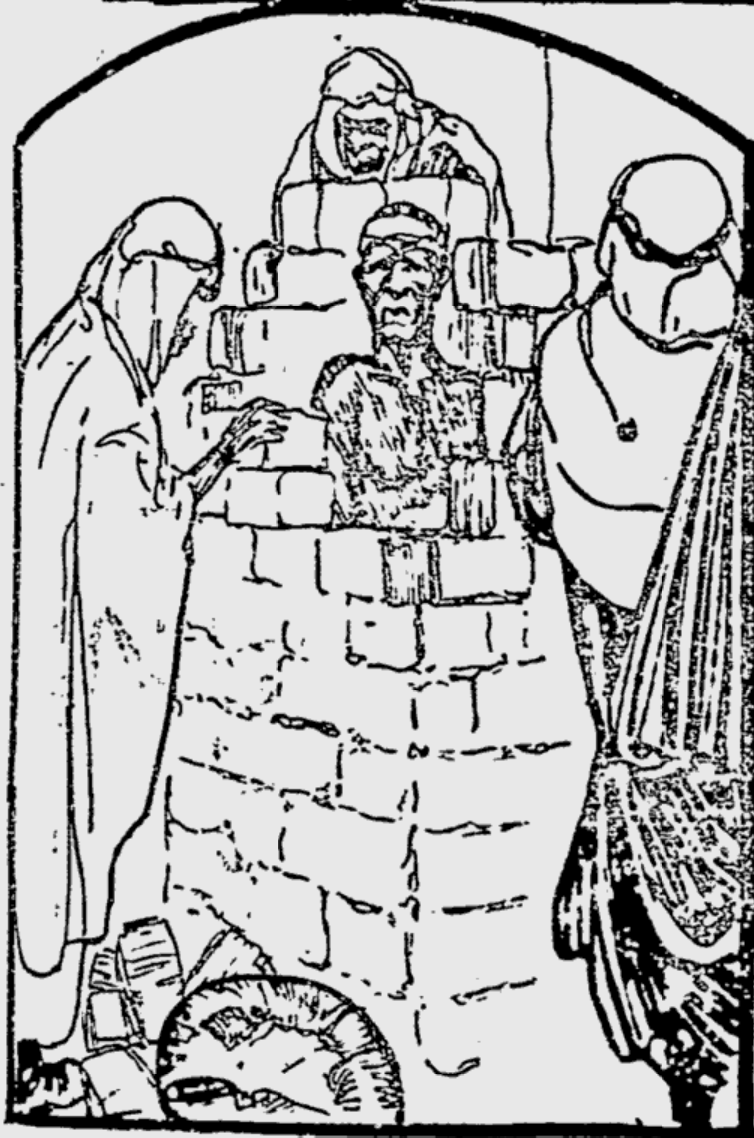
- Illustration of Hadj Mohammed Mesfewi's execution in a 1906 newspaper
- Born: Between 1850s and 1870s Marrakesh, Morocco
- Died: June 13, 1906 (aged 30s–50s); Marrakesh, Morocco
- Cause of death: Execution by immurement (dehydration or starvation)
- Other name: The Marrakesh Arch-Killer
- Conviction: Murder
- Penalty: Death

Details
- Victims: 36+
- Country: Morocco
- Date apprehended: April 1906

Hadj Mohammed Mesfewi (died June 13, 1906), called the "Marrakesh Arch-Killer", was a Moroccan serial killer who murdered at least 36 women.

== Killings ==
Mesfewi worked as a shoemaker and trader in Marrakesh. Assisted by a 70-year-old woman named Annah, Mesfewi killed young women who came to his shop to dictate letters. He drugged his victims before decapitating them with a dagger. Moroccan authorities found the remains of 20 mutilated bodies in a deep pit under his shop, while another 16 were discovered in the garden outside. He was caught after the parents of one young victim traced her movements back to his shop. Annah died under torture and Mesfewi confessed that he killed the women for their money; often the sums were very small.

== Execution ==
After being convicted, Mesfewi was initially sentenced to be crucified on May 2, 1906. Due to international outcry, the sentence was changed to beheading. However, public sentiment in Marrakesh was for him to suffer, so every day for four weeks he was led from his cell into the market square and lashed ten times with a rod made from thorny acacia. It was finally decided because of the heinous nature of his crimes and as a warning for all, Mesfewi would be walled up alive in the Marrakesh bazaar on June 11, 1906.

The cell was made by two masons who created a hole in the bazaar's thick walls about 2 ft (0.61 m) deep and wide and about 6 ft (1.8 m) high. Chains were fixed to the back wall to ensure Mesfewi did not attempt to escape and to keep him standing. On the day his sentence was carried out, Mesfewi screamed for mercy and fought with his jailers when he was led to the cell. After he had been chained up, bystanders threw filth and offal at him. The masons then came forward and began laying courses of masonry to brick up the opening. After his entombment, the crowd cheered every time they heard him scream inside. Mesfewi could be heard for two days before falling silent on the third day.

== Literature ==
- Peter Murakami, Julia Murakami: Dictionary of Serial Killers: 450 Case Studies of a Pathological Killing Type. Ullstein Paperback, 2000, ISBN 3-548-35935-3.
- Saeida Rouass: The Assembly of the Dead. Impress Books, 2017, ISBN 978-1-907605-77-2.

== See also ==
- List of serial killers by country
- List of serial killers by number of victims
