= Vittae =

Ancient Roman hairstyle accessory

The vittae were a type of woolen band used to bind up the hair of Roman women, wrapping itself around the head like a fillet. This piece of clothing appeared in the attires of Vestal Virgins and it is also mentioned as a bridal adornment; it may also have appeared in the coiffure of Roman matrons. It may have symbolically represented concepts such as chastity and purity, thereby signifying that the wearer also possessed these qualities. Due to these connotations, it may have served as some variety of apotropaic device designed to protect the perceived virtue of the wearer. However, it is possible that it was either an antiquated practice that had already faded into obscurity during the Roman Republic, before being intentionally revived by the moral legislation of Emperor Augustus, or was invented during this period as an archaism. In either scenario, the band may have functioned as a more artificial honorific granted to specific women. The vittae are referenced in tandem with another type of garment called the infulae, with the author Servius the Grammarian claiming that the vittae hung from the sides of the infulae. It is possible, however, that the term "vittae" was used metonymically to refer to the infulae as the former term is more easily able to fit the constraints of dactylic hexameter, a style found in Roman poetry.

== Usage ==
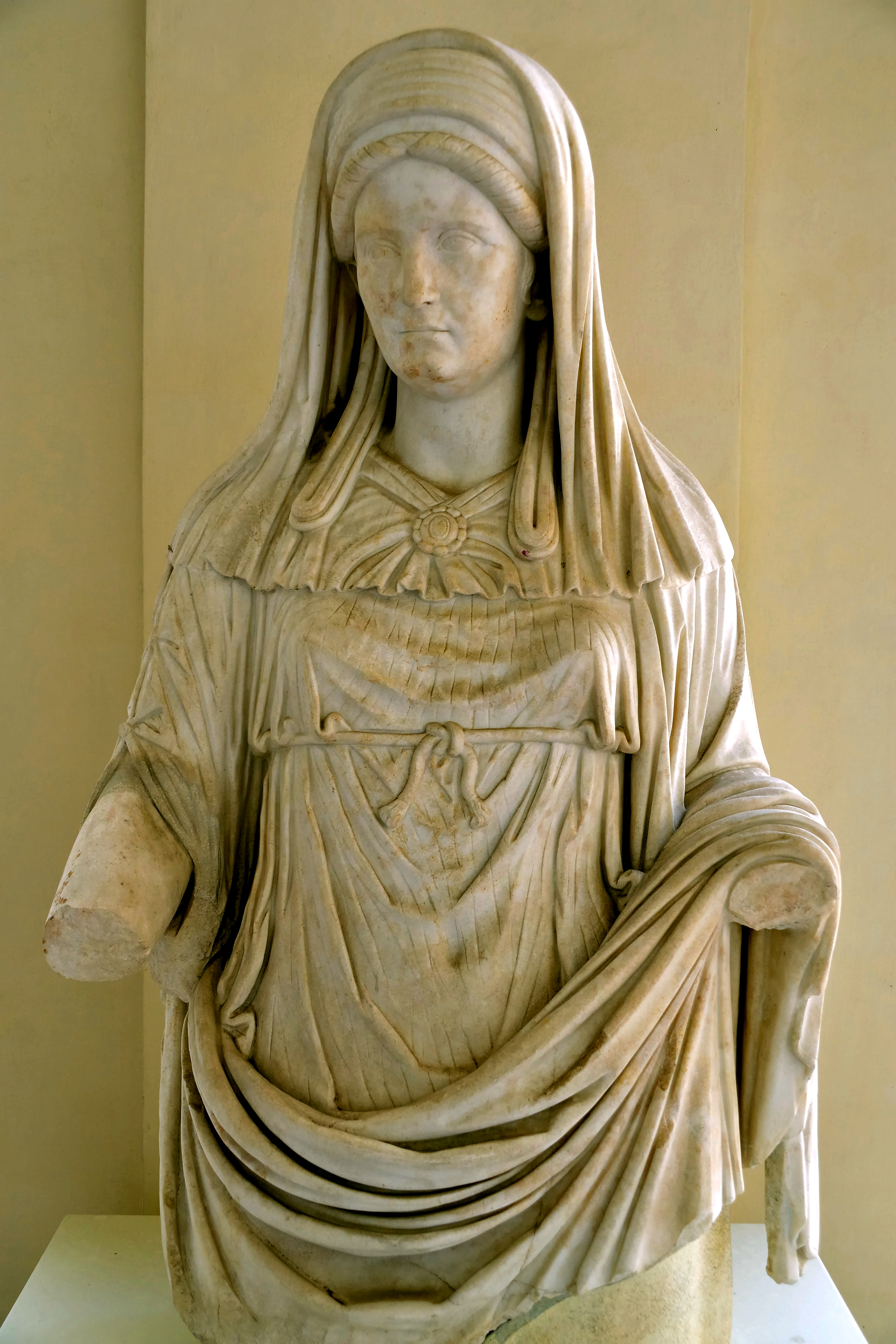
2nd-century CE portrait depicting a Vestal Virgin, the looped strings by her neck may be vittae

=== Among Brides and Vestal Virgins ===
Accounts from Propertius, a 1st-century BCE Roman love elegist, suggest that vittae were components of the bridal attire. In of his poems, Propertius depicts the perspective of a deceased woman named Cornelia on Paullus, her still living husband, stating "Soon, the bordered (toga) yielded to wedding torches, and another altera vitta captured my bound hair, and I was joined to your bed, Paullus, destined to leave it." This passage may be interpreted as referring to Cornelia abandoning her childhood fillets for bridal fillets, or as Cornelia relinquishing her childhood fillets for matronal fillets. Another passage from Propertius details the misfortunes of Arethusa, who laments that their wedding was tainted as her vitta was not placed upon her head properly. The vittae, alongside the stolae, are used in Roman literature as shorthand for the Roman matron. Tibullus, a 1st-century BCE Roman elegist, implores Delia, his mistress, to behave like a proper Roman woman, saying "Teach her to be chaste, although no vitta binds her hair together." Similarly, Plautus describes an incident in which a slave named Palaestrio advised as old man named Periplectomenus to disguise the prostitute Acroteleutium as his wife, instructing him to adorn her with vittae styled after the "fashion of matrons." It is likely that vittae were considered to be representative of chastity and purity: the 4th-century grammarian Servius states that prostitutes were forbidden from wearing the garment and Ovid commands the "chaste" vittae to stay away from his sexually explicit poems. British-Canadian Classicist Elaine Fantham proposes that the vittae may have offered some variety of "moral protection" comparable to the "bulla," an apotropaic amulet used to protect Roman boys. The vittae are also mentioned as an ornament of the Vestal Virgins: Ovid describes the Vestal Virgin Rhea Silvia adorned with the garment, 4th-century Roman orator Quintus Aurelius Symmachus also describes the Vestal Virgins as decorated with the vittae, the 2nd-century Roman poet Juvenal mentions a priestess wearing the vitta. Two Christian authors, the 4th-century Christian writers Prudentius and Ambrose, also connect the vittae to the Vestal Virgins: Prudentius describes a Vestal Virgin sitting down whilst wearing a vitta and Ambrose describes the "veiled and filleted" head of Vestal Virgins.

=== Among Roman Matrons ===
The extent to which vittae were regularly worn by Roman women is disputed. Marcus Terentius Varro, a 1st-century BCE Roman polymath, describes the vittae as an ancient style of Roman dress, although he claims that it was, at one point, a regular component of the attire of a Roman woman. German classical philologist Jan Radicke interprets this past-tense description as a sign that, although the style had fallen out of favor by the time of Varro, it had remained preserved in the cultural consciousness and potentially in important religious ceremonies. However, vittae reappear in the later literature of the Augustan and Early Imperial period as, according to Radicke, an "artificial signifier" of matronal virtue in Roman society that was either "revived or invented" by Emperor Augustus himself. Ovid occasionally refers to the vittae with legalistic language, describing it as an "honor" and mentioning that the vittae protects its wearers exposure to lascivious artworks. Radicke interprets this description as referencing either marriage or a possible sacrosanct status of matrons, concluding that the vittae possibly signified that the wearer was a married woman, and thus protected in some manner. Furthermore, in his Tristia, Ovid explicitly defends the legality of his writings, exclaiming "I shall sing of nothing but of what is lawful and of secret love that is allowed. There shall be no crime in my song. Did I not exclude rigorously from reading my Ars amatoria all women whom the wearing of stola and vitta protects from contact with it?" Such statements from Ovid may be further contextualized by the Augustan Leges Juliae ("Laws of Julia"), which largely concerned the punishment of acts considered by the Romans to constitute sexual immorality. Radicke suggests that, due to this legislation, the vittae may have been a "legal privilege" during the time of Ovid. The 1st-century Latin author Valerius Maximus describes—likely in an almost entirely pseudohistorical manner—an event from the life of Gnaeus Marcius Coriolanus, a legendary 5th-century BCE Roman general, in which the Senate honored various women by offering them vittae. Although this account is almost certainty an inaccurate historical description, it may provide insight into cultural perspectives on the vittae contemporary to Valerius Maximus himself. If this passage does offer such information, then it showcases by the lifetime of Valerius the vittae were offered by the Senate specifically as honorifics.

If vittae were a common component of the attire of Roman women, then it remains unclear why they are largely absent from Roman portraiture. Classicist Susan E. Wood theorized that vittae would have been identified on a sculpture by the colors, as the coloring could differentiate between individual strands of fabric and hair locks. However, the pigment of many Roman sculptures has been lost and thus it is impossible to clearly identify the vittae on any portrait. Elaine Fantham disputes this perspective, arguing that, given the precise detail in many other Roman portraits, it is unlikely that Roman artists would not have meticulously sculpted the vittae in three dimensions. Radicke argues that the vittae, over time, may have lost their social significance and decayed into a more common piece of female clothing in ancient Rome. According to Radicke, the vittae almost entirely disappeared from Roman literature following the account of Valerius, although they appear in the writings of the early 3rd-century jurist Ulpian.

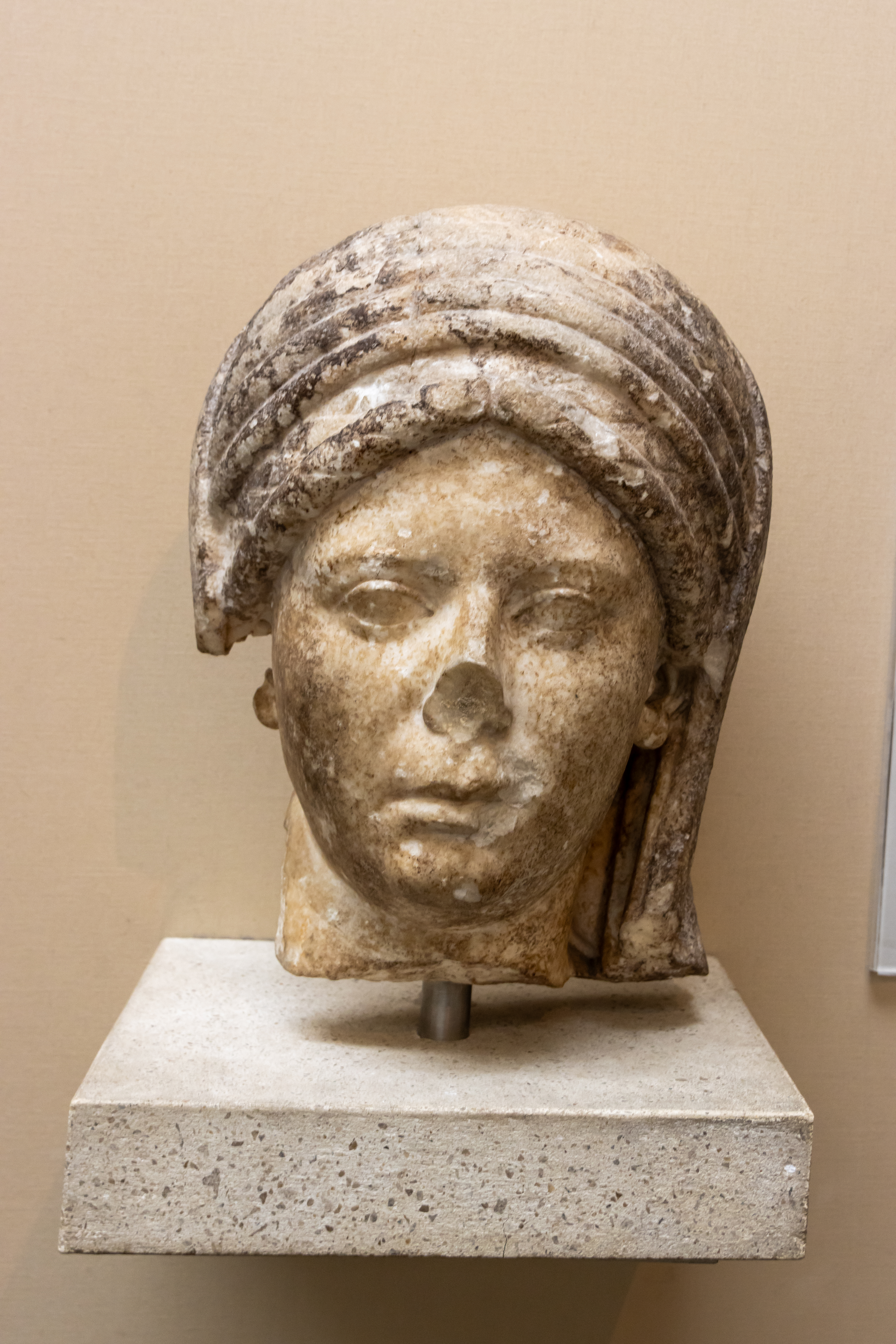
Portrait of a Vestal Virgin from the British Museum depicting the six folds of the infulae

Radicke suggests that there may have been two distinct types of vittae: virginal vittae, the type associated with religious and ritual functions, and the matronal vittae, the kind worn in the outfits of married Roman women. In literature from the early Imperial period onwards, the virginal vittae often appear in a mythological context, usually with some connection to virgin goddesses: Ovid mentions that the virgin goddess Phoebe had her hair bound by a vitta and that the nymph Callisto was adorned with a white vitta, Vergil describes them in connection to the goddess Vesta and the Vestal Virgins in the Aeneid, and Horace mentions that the Roman noblewomen Livia and Octavia wore the vittae during a ritual procession commemorating Augustus' return from military campaign in 24 BCE. Pliny the Elder mentions that a "white vitta" was used to wrap around a "garland of spikes," also providing evidence for a potential etymological connection between the word "vitta" and the Latin verb "viere," meaning "to twist, to plait." The matronal "vittae" is described as "tenuis," or "narrow," by Ovid. In the early 3rd-century BCE, the Roman jurist Ulpian mentions vittae ornamented with pearls.

== Connection to the infulae ==
According to Servius, vittae hung from the sides of another—potentially bridal—adornment: a red and white band-like crown called the infula. Servius provides additional descriptions of the infula, stating that they were worn like diadems and made from white or scarlet threads. Infula were connected to religious Rituals in ancient Rome: Festus claims they were a wool thread used to drape priests, temples, and sacrificial victims. Both infulae and vittae may have been used to consecrate both inanimate and animate objects. In a wedding poem authored by the 1st-century CE poet Statius, the goddess Juno gives the vittae to a bride and Concordia sanctifies them. In the Aeneid, Helenus is said to have removed his vittae after he was finished sacrificing oxen. Infulae appear much more frequently in standard literature than vittae, which are more common in poetry: the word infula appears only twice in the Aeneid while 1st-century BCE historian Livy mentions it often. At one point in his work Ab urbe condita, Livy describes diplomats from Syracuse came to Rome adorned with infulae. Fantham argued that this discrepancy regarding the usage of infulae and vittae between poetry and other works emerged as the limitations of dactylic verse permit only the nominative singular form of infula, making vitta a much more practical word to use for poetic purposes. Thus, Fantham concludes that Roman poets may have substituted the infula for vitta for poetic convenience. Fantham cites a line from the Epistulae ex Ponto of Ovid in which he mentions an "infula" that is replaced by the word "vittis" in the next line.
