= The Impostor (Banjo Concerto) =

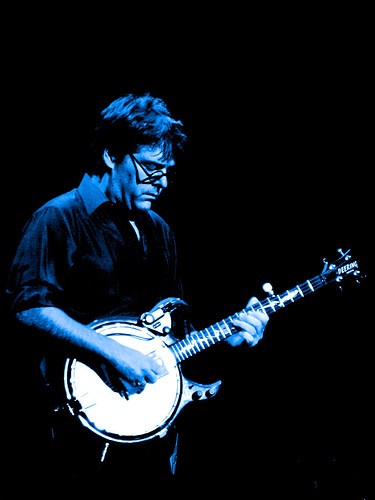
Béla Fleck in 2007

The Impostor is a concerto for banjo and orchestra written by Béla Fleck. Fleck premiered the concerto on September 22, 2011, with the Nashville Symphony (Giancarlo Guerrero conducting) in the Schermerhorn Symphony Center in Nashville. It was recorded over the course of three live performances and released on the eponymous album The Impostor.

The concerto is dedicated to Earl Scruggs, who Fleck lists as his primary inspiration for playing the banjo.

== Music ==
The concerto is scored for 2 flutes, piccolo, 2 oboes, English horn, 2 clarinets, bass clarinet, 2 bassoons, contrabassoon, 4 horns, 3 trumpets, 2 trombones, bass trombone, tuba, tympani, percussion, and strings.

It is in three movements:

1. Infiltration
2. Integration
3. Truth Revealed

The entire concerto is about 36 minutes long.

== Composition ==
The concerto was commissioned by the Nashville Symphony in 2011. The uphill six-month long writing process became the subject of a documentary called How to Write a Banjo Concerto which Fleck co-directed with Sascha Paladino. One of the most challenging parts of the writing process Fleck had to overcome was that he had no experience in writing orchestral music. In an interview with the Wall Street Journal, Fleck described his ability to read music as "rather primitive." He overcame this by writing the orchestral parts in banjo tab, then used computer software to "translate" the tab into standard music notation.

The concerto depicts a "heroes' journey, with the banjo in the starring role." The unusual naming of the movements, which he found after composition was completed, relates Fleck's feelings of being an outsider:

A musician like myself can feel that way pretty regularly, even though the point of much of what I do is to attempt to find ways to fit naturally into many diverse environments. I often do feel like an impostor, and if anyone ever figured out the truth, I’m certain that I’d be ejected, immediately. So maybe the banjo player snuck into the orchestra with a disguise on (Infiltration), was pretty convincing that he belonged there (Integration), but at some point he let the cat out of the bag (Truth Revealed): He/I am a low-class banjo playing scuffler and should be tossed out forthwith! But that’s just one interpretation.”
