= Az imposztor =

Hungarian play

Az imposztor (The impostor) is a Hungarian play, written by György Spiró. It was first produced in 1983.
