= Harold Edward Bindloss =

Prolific author of novels set mostly in western Canada and West Africa

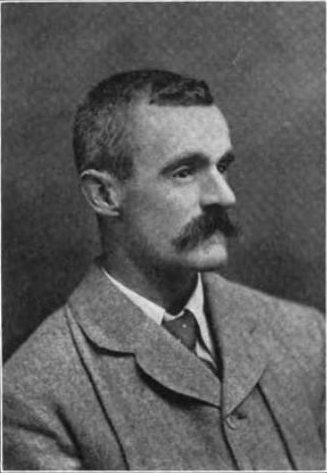
- Bindloss circa 1909
- Born: 6 April 1866; Wavertree, Liverpool, England
- Died: 30 December 1945 (aged 79); Carlisle, Cumbria, England
- Occupation: Author
- Years active: 1898–1945
- Known for: Novels of life in Canada and adventure in West Africa

Harold Edward Bindloss (6 April 1866 – 30 December 1945) was an English novelist who wrote many adventure novels set in western Canada (Note: Harrison states that Bindloss set at least 19 of his novels on the Canadian prairies.), and some in West Africa and England. His writing was strongly based on his own experience, whether as a seaman, a dock worker, a farmer or a planter.

== Biography ==
Bindloss was born in on 6 April 1866 in Wavertree, Liverpool, England. the eldest son of Edward Williams Bindloss (born c. 1838), an iron merchant with six men in his employ at the time of the 1881 census. Bindloss had three sisters and four brothers. He spent several years at sea and in various colonies, especially in Africa, before returning to England in 1896, his health broken by malaria. Bindloss was absent from the family home in 1881, but the 1891 census found him living at home and serving as an iron-merchant's clerk, presumably for his father.

He apparently began work as a clerk in a shipping office but this did not suit his adventurous spirit, and he was at various times a farmer in Canada, a sailor, a dock worker and a planter. He returned to England in 1896, presumably from West Africa, as he returned sick of malaria. Given that he spent more than a decade at sea and in the colonies, it seems likely that his experience abroad was in two parts, first as a youth, and then as a young man, after 1891.

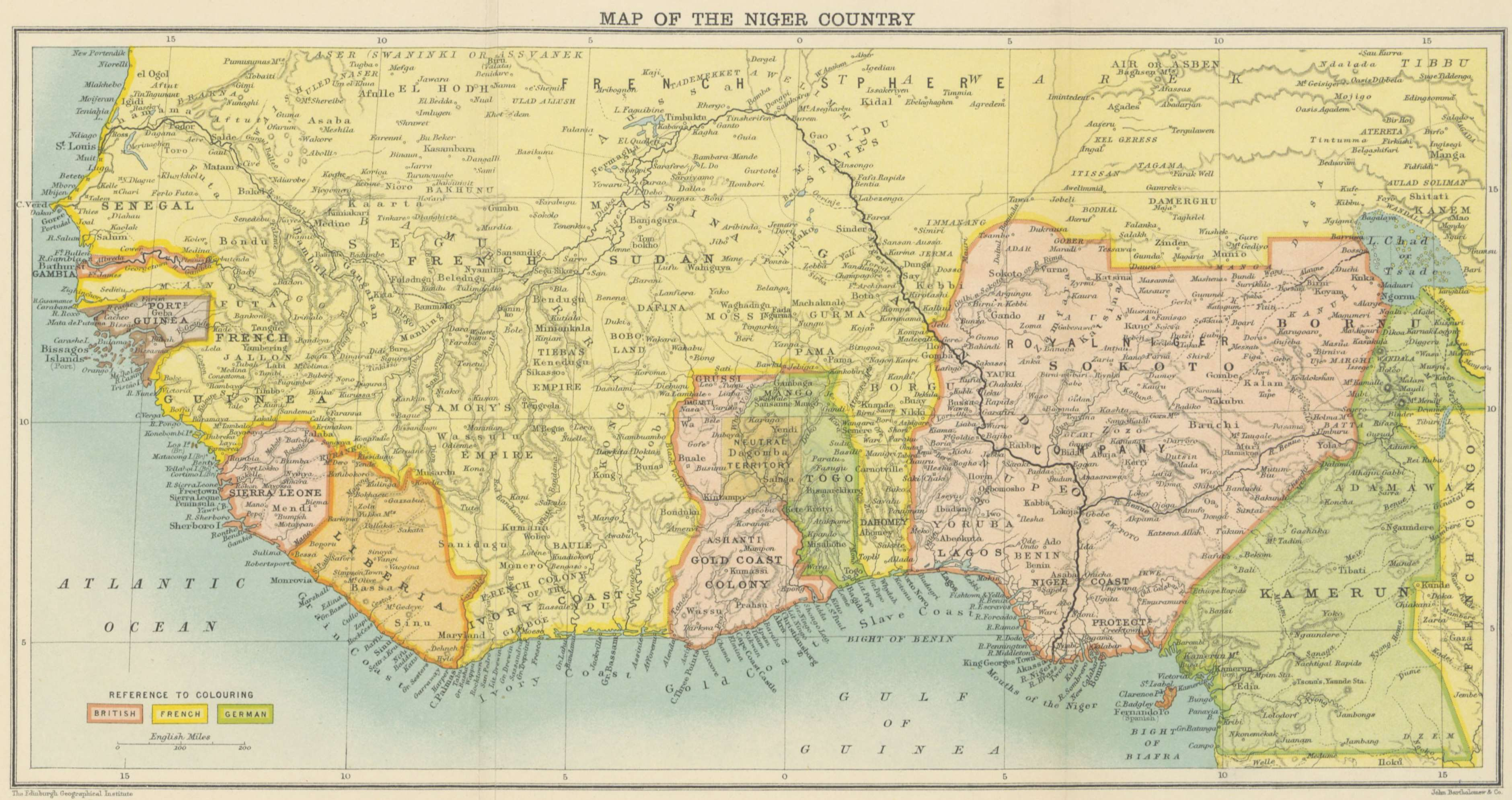
Map of the West Africa in 1898 from In the Niger Country by Bindloss

After returning home in 1896 he began working as a journalist, and then wrote two non-fiction books based on his travels, the first, In the Niger Country (1898, Blackwood & Sons, Edinburgh) (Note: The book was quite topical as the Hut Tax War was in progress in Sierra Leone in 1898, as were operations by the Niger Coast Protectorate in Nigeria.) about West Africa, and the second, A Wide Dominion (1899, T. Fisher Unwin, London) about Canada. His first novel was Ainslie's Ju-Ju, set in West Africa which Truth described as "a book that has the double interest and excitement of a story and of a genuine record of travel and adventure mixed together judiciously." This was the first of nearly one hundred novels by Bindloss. The next A Sower of Wheat (1901, Chatto and Windus, London) was set in Canada. This set the pattern for Bindloss, as most of his novels were set in Canada or West Africa. The Guardian refers to him as having two strings to his bow, stories set in Canada or West Africa, with the Canadian stories being remarkably superior.

Bindloss married Mary Simpson Hossack (11 Mar 1869 – 2 November 1945) the youngest daughter of Captain Joseph Hossack, a marine surveyor, at St James Church in West Derby, Lancaster, on 12 June 1899. The couple appear not to have had any children as the 1911 census records them as not having had any after twelve years of marriage.

Bindloss was a prolific author. The most common obituary estimate is that he wrote over 40 novels. ABC Bookworld lists 62 books by Bindloss. Kemp states that he wrote two to three books a year in the early 1900s. (Note: The Jisc Catalogue shows him as publishing seven books in 1910, five in 1908, and four in both 1907 and 1914.) The Belfast Newsletter states that he published 67 books. However, Jisc Library Hub Discover (Note: The Jisc Library Hub Discover brings together the catalogues of 168 major UK and Irish libraries. Additional libraries are being added all the time, and the catalogue collates national, university, and research libraries.) lists 89 books by Bindloss, the first two being non-fiction and the rest novels. (Note: This total is subject to the risk of understatement as not all of his books are necessarily catalogued in the libraries covered by Jisc, and overstatement as the titles of his books varied by marketplace. ABC Bookworld identifies several books with two or more titles., others have been identified by examining the copies of US versions on the HathiTrust website.)

He is remembered in the name of the town Bindloss, Alberta, Canada, established by the Canadian Pacific Railroad in 1914.

Bindloss died on 30 December 1945 at Chertsey Hill Nursing Home in Carlisle, England. He had been living at Vallum, Burgh-by-Sands in Cumbria. His estate was valued at £24,774 0s. 9d. His wife had died at home on 2 November 1945, and he was granted probate, as her executor just a fortnight before he died.

== Works ==
Books by Bindloss listed in the Jisc Library Hub Discover database
Ser	Year	Title	Publisher	Pages	Title in US and Canada	Notes
1	1898	In the Niger Country	Edinburgh: Blackwood & Sons	x, 338 p. 1 fold-out map, 23 cm.		(Note: Non-fiction: Describes a visit to West Africa.)
2	1899	A Wide Dominion	London: T. Fisher Unwin	239 p., (8º)		(Note: A book about life in Canada, not a novel. The Morning Post wrote that while the book "may possibly be of some use to those who think of emigrating to Canada, though we doubt it.")
3	1900	Ainslie's Ju-Ju. A Romance of the Hinterland	London: Chatto & Windus	vi. 274 p., (8º)		(Note: Set in West Africa. Republished in 1914 as No. 158 in Hodder & Stoughton's shilling library. A mixture of fiction and travel documentary.)
4	1901	A Sower of Wheat	London: Chatto & Windus	vi. 373 p., (8º)	Lorimer of the Northwest	(Note: Published by A. L. Burt in New York in 1909.)
5	1902	The Concession-Hunters	London: Chatto & Windus	316p., (8º)		(Note: Set in West Africa. Truth said if you skipped the love scenes and wholly ignored the heroine, the book was "a really thrilling adventure story of West Africa.")
6	1902	Sunshine and Snow	London: S.W. Partridge & Co	128, 24 p. : 8 ill., (8º)		
7	1903	His Master Purpose	London: John Long	316 p., (8º)	Thurston of Orchard Valley	(Note: Published by F. A. Stokes in New York in 1910. Published as a serial in the UK in 1906. An English engineer makes his fortune in Canada.)
8	1903	The Mistress of Bonaventure	London: Chatto & Windus	vi. 408 p., (8º)		
9	1904	Daventry's Daughter	London: Chatto & Windus	vi. 364 p., (8º)		
10	1904	The League of the Leopard	London: John Long	324 p., (8º)		
11	1904	True Grit. The Adventures of Two Lads in Western Africa	London: S. W. Partridge & Co	330 p., (8º)		
12	1905	Alton of Somasco	London: John Long	375 p., (8º)		(Note: Published by A. L. Burt in New York in 1905.)
13	1905	The Impostor	London: F. V. White & Co	vi. 311 p., (8º)	Winston of the Prairie	(Note: US Publication in 1907 by Grosset & Dunlap, New York)
14	1905	In the Misty Seas : a Story of the Sealers of Behring Strait	London: S. W. Partridge and Co	330, 32 p., 6 ill., (8º)		
15	1906	Beneath Her Station	London: F. V. White & Co	vi. 310 p., (8º)		
16	1906	The Cattle-Baron's Daughter	London: John Long	316 p., (8º)		
17	1906	A Damaged Reputation	London: F. V. White & Co	vi, 312 p., (8º)		
18	1907	Delilah of the Snows	London: John Long	346 p., (8º)		
19	1907	The Dust of Conflict	London: John Long	353 p., (8º)		
20	1907	His Lady's Pleasure	London: F. V. White & Co	vi. 306 p., (8º)	For Jacinta	(Note: US Publication in 1908 by Grosset & Dunlap, New York)
21	1908	By Right of Purchase	London: John Long	346 p., (8º)		
22	1908	The Liberationist	London: Ward, Lock & Co	351 p., (8º)	Long Odds	(Note: Set in the Rubber Trade in West Africa.)
23	1908	Thrice Armed	London: John Long	334 p., (8º)		
24	1909	The Greater Power	London: John Long	347 p., fs., (8º)		
25	1910	Alison's Adventure	London: John Long	335 p., (8º)	A Prairie Courtship	
26	1910	The Gold Trail	London: John Long	347 p., (8º)		
27	1910	Hawtrey's Deputy	London: Ward, Lock & Co	352 p., (8º)	Masters of the Wheat-lands	
28	1910	The Opium Smugglers	London: T. Fisher Unwin	318 p., (8º)	The Boy Ranchers of Puget Sound	(Note: Published by F. A. Stokes in New York in 1910.)
29	1910	Rancher Carteret	London: John Long	335 p., (8º)		
30	1911	The Protector	London: Ward, Lock & Co	320 p., (8º)	Vane of the Timberlands	
31	1912	By Right of Passage	London: John Long	318 p. : 1 ill., (8º)		
32	1912	The Pioneer	London: Ward, Lock & Co	373 p., (8º)	The Long Portage	
33	1912	The Trustee	London: Ward, Lock & Co.	328, 8 p. : col. fs., (8º)	Ranching for Sylvia	
34	1913	The Allinson Honour	London: Ward, Lock & Co.	320, 16 p. : col. fs., (8º)		
35	1913	The Greater Power	London: John Long	318 p., (8º)		
36	1913	The Wastrel	London: Ward, Lock & Co.	320 p. : col. fs., (8º)	Prescott of Sackatchewan	
37	1914	Blake's Burden	London: Ward, Lock & Co.	320 p. : col. fs., (8º)	The Intriguers	
38	1914	Harold's Burden	London: Ward, Lock	320 p. : 1 col. ill., (8º)		
39	1914	The Secret of the Reef	London: Ward, Lock & Co.	320, 16 p. : col. fs., (8º)		
40	1915	The Intruder	London: Ward, Lock & Co.	320, 16 p. : col. fs., (8º)	Harding of Allenwood	
41	1915	A Risky Game	London: Ward, Lock & Co.	320, 16 p., col. fs., (8º)	The Coast of Adventure	
42	1916	The Borderer	London: Ward, Lock & Co.	320 p. : col. fs., (8º)	Johnstone of the Border	
43	1916	His One Talent	London: Ward, Lock & Co.	320 p. : fs., (8º)	Brandon of the Engineers	
44	1917	Carmen's Messenger	London: Ward, Lock & Co.	319 p. : fs., (8º)		
45	1917	Crossthwaite of Banisdale	London: Ward, Lock & Co.	255 p., 18 cm.		
46	1917	Sadie's Conquest	London: Ward, Lock & Co.	vi, 7-303, 15, fs., (8º)	The Girl from Keller's	
47	1918	Agatha's Fortune	London: Ward, Lock & Co.	319 p. : fs., (8º)	The Lure of the North	
48	1918	Askew's Victory	London: Ward, Lock & Co.	319 p. : fs., (8º)	The Bucaneer Farmer	
49	1919	Dearham's Inheritance	London: Ward, Lock & Co.	319 p. : fs., (8º)	Partners of the Out-trail	
50	1919	Wyndham's Partner	London: Ward, Lock & Co.	320 p. : fs., (8º)	Wyndham's Pal	
51	1920	The Head of the House	London: Ward, Lock & Co.	320 p., (8º)	Lister's Great Adventure	
52	1920	Stayward's Vindication	London: Ward, Lock & Co.	315, [4] p., (8º)	The Wilderness Mine	
53	1921	The Man from the Wilds	London: Ward, Lock & Co.	319 p., (8º)		
54	1921	Musgrave's Luck	London: Ward, Lock & Co.	313, [6] p., (8º)	Kit Musgrave's Luck	
55	1922	The Mountaineers	London: Ward, Lock & Co.	310, 10 p., (8º)	Northwest!	
56	1923	The Keystone Block	London: Ward, Lock & Co.	308, [12] p., (8º)	The Bush-Rancher	
57	1923	The Wilderness Patrol	London: Ward, Lock & Co.	312, [8] p., (8º)		
58	1924	Andrew's Folly	London: Ward, Lock & Co.	310, [10] p., (8º)	Green Timber	
59	1924	The Boys of Wildcat Ranch	London: Wells Gardner & Co	242 p., (8º)		
60	1924	The Lute Player	London: Ward, Lock & Co.	315, [4] p., (8º)	Carson of Red River	
61	1925	The Broken Net	London: Ward, Lock & Co.	256 p., (8º)	Prairie Gold	
62	1925	A Debt of Honour	London: Ward, Lock & Co.	313 p., (8º)		
63	1926	Helen the Conqueror	New York: A.L. Burt	314 p., (8º)		(Note: Published by Ward, Lock and Co, in London.)
64	1926	Sour Grapes	London: Ward, Lock & Co.	304, [16] p., (8º)	The Broken Trail	
65	1927	The Dark Road	London: Ward, Lock & Co.	319 p., (8º)		
66	1927	Footsteps	London: Ward, Lock & Co.	304, [16] p., (8º)		
67	1928	The Firm Hand	London: Ward, Lock & Co.	320 p., (8º)	The Lone Hand	
68	1928	Halford's Adventure	London: Ward, Lock & Co.	319 p., (8º)	Mystery Reef	
69	1929	Frontiersmen	London: Ward, Lock & Co.	320 p., (8º)	The Frontiersman	
70	1929	The Harder Way	London: Ward, Lock & Co.	320 p., (8º)		
71	1930	Harden's Escapade	London: Ward, Lock & Co.	320 p., (8º)	The Man at Willow Ranch	
72	1930	A Moorside Feud	London: Ward, Lock & Co.	320 p., (8º)		
73	1931	Carter's Triumph	London: Ward, Lock & Co.	320 p., (8º)	The Border Trail	
74	1931	The Lean Years	London: Ward, Lock & Co.	320 p., (8º)	The Prairie Patrol	
75	1932	Right of Way	London: Ward, Lock & Co.	312, [8] p., (8º)		
76	1933	The Loser Pays	London: Ward, Lock & Co.	319 p., (8º)		
77	1933	The Stain of the Forge	London: Ward, Lock & Co.	312, [8] p., (8º)		
78	1934	Sonalta Gold	London: Ward, Lock & Co.	314, [6] p., (8º)	Valley Gold	(Note: U. S. Publication in 1934 by F. A. Stokes, New York)
79	1935	The Lady of the Plain	London: Ward, Lock & Co.	319 p., (8º)		
80	1936	The Forbidden River	London: Ward, Lock & Co.	314 p., (8º)		
81	1937	Fellside Folk	London: Ward, Lock & Co.	317, [2] p., (8º)		
82	1938	Posted Missing	London: Ward, Lock & Co.	319 p., (8º)		
83	1939	Valeria Goes West	London: Ward, Lock & Co.	319 p., (8º)		
84	1940	What's Mine I Hold	London: Ward, Lock & Co.	320 p., (8º)		
85	1941	The Call of the Soil	London: Ward, Lock & Co.	316, [4] p., (8º)		
86	1942	The Secret of the Scree	London: Ward, Lock & Co.	288 p., (8º)		
87	1943	Caverhills	London: Ward, Lock & Co.	254, [2] p., (8º)		
88	1945	The Laird o' Borrans	London: Ward, Lock & Co.	224 p., (8º)		
89	1946	Richardsons of the Forge	London: Ward, Lock & Co.	239 p., (8º)		

== Assessment ==
Bindloss was a popular author. Some of his works such as, Alton of Somasco, Alison's Adventure, Delilah of the Snows and Thrice Armed were reprinted numerous times on both sides of the Atlantic. One reviewer writes: "A new book by Harold Bindloss is always welcome. He tells a story well indeed, but one likes his books best perhaps for the environment which he knows so well how to sketch. He has written charming stories of the Canadian Northwest and one remembers with pleasure his novels Prescott of Saskatchewan and Winston of the Prairie."

One strong feature of Bindloss's work was that he wrote from his own experience, either of the sea, of Canada, or West Africa. The Buffalo Courier notes that "His descriptions are not those of the land-lubber who writes from a safe-point of vantage... He writes from a varied and wide experience of the charm the sea exerts over those, who once set forth upon its trackless waste."

The Oakland Tribune also wrote: "It has become so that a new book by Bindloss is warmly greeted, for while it Is like greeting an old friend, in a way, there is certain to be new characters and new manner of bringing a quickening of the blood and a tendency to hold the breath. Bindloss, besides writing of the sort of men and women that most of the world knows earns blessings by not making then transcend the improbable either in thought or deed. More briefly, they are human beings with greater opportunity for excitement that falls to the lot of most."

Harrison stated that "Bindloss was probably a more capable craftsman than any native Canadian writer of the period" and that "he had spent enough time in the West to make his settings authentic with real observed details."
